= Frankfurt =

Largest city in Hesse, Germany

Frankfurt am Main Frangford am Maa (Hessian)
- City
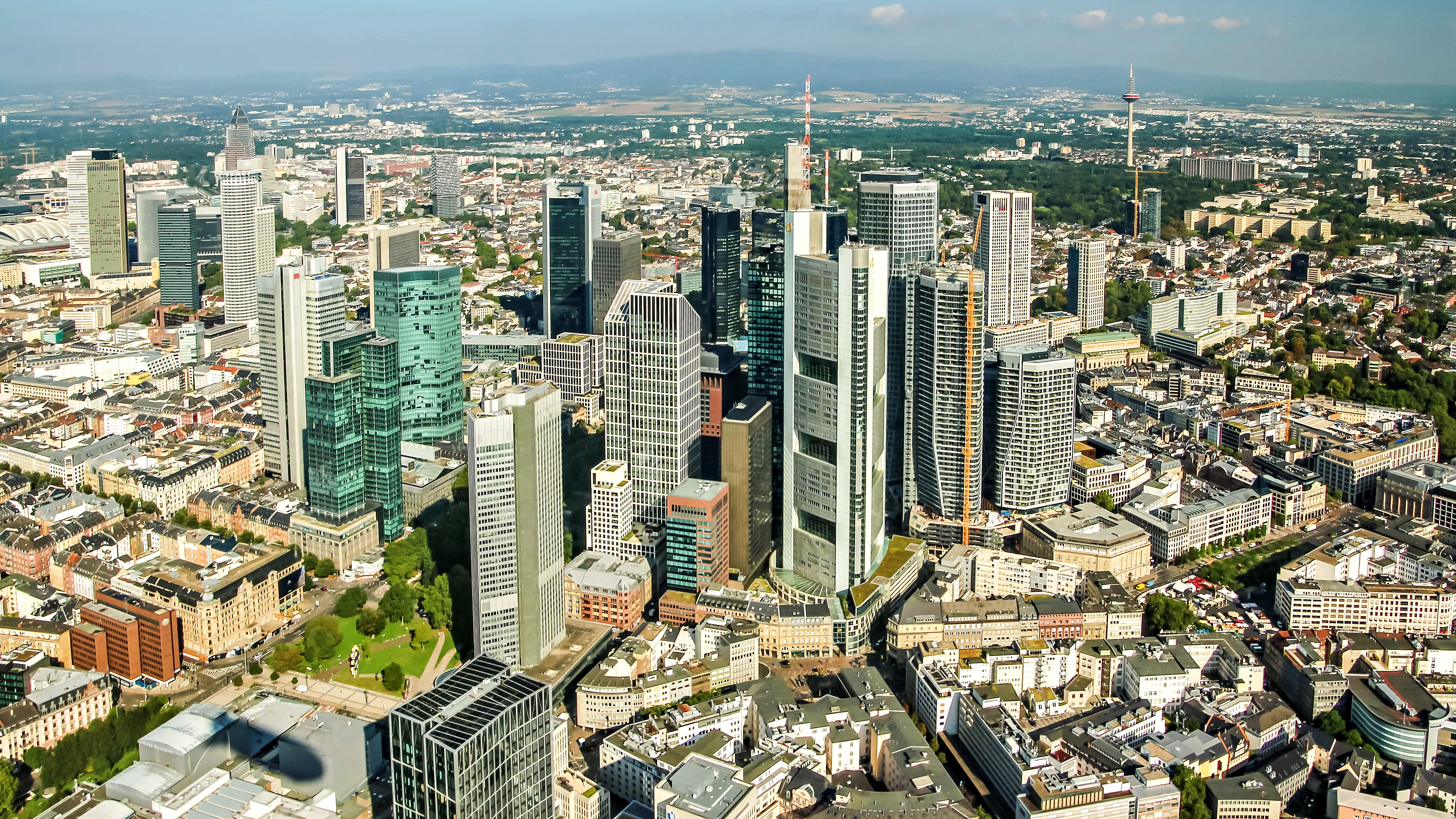
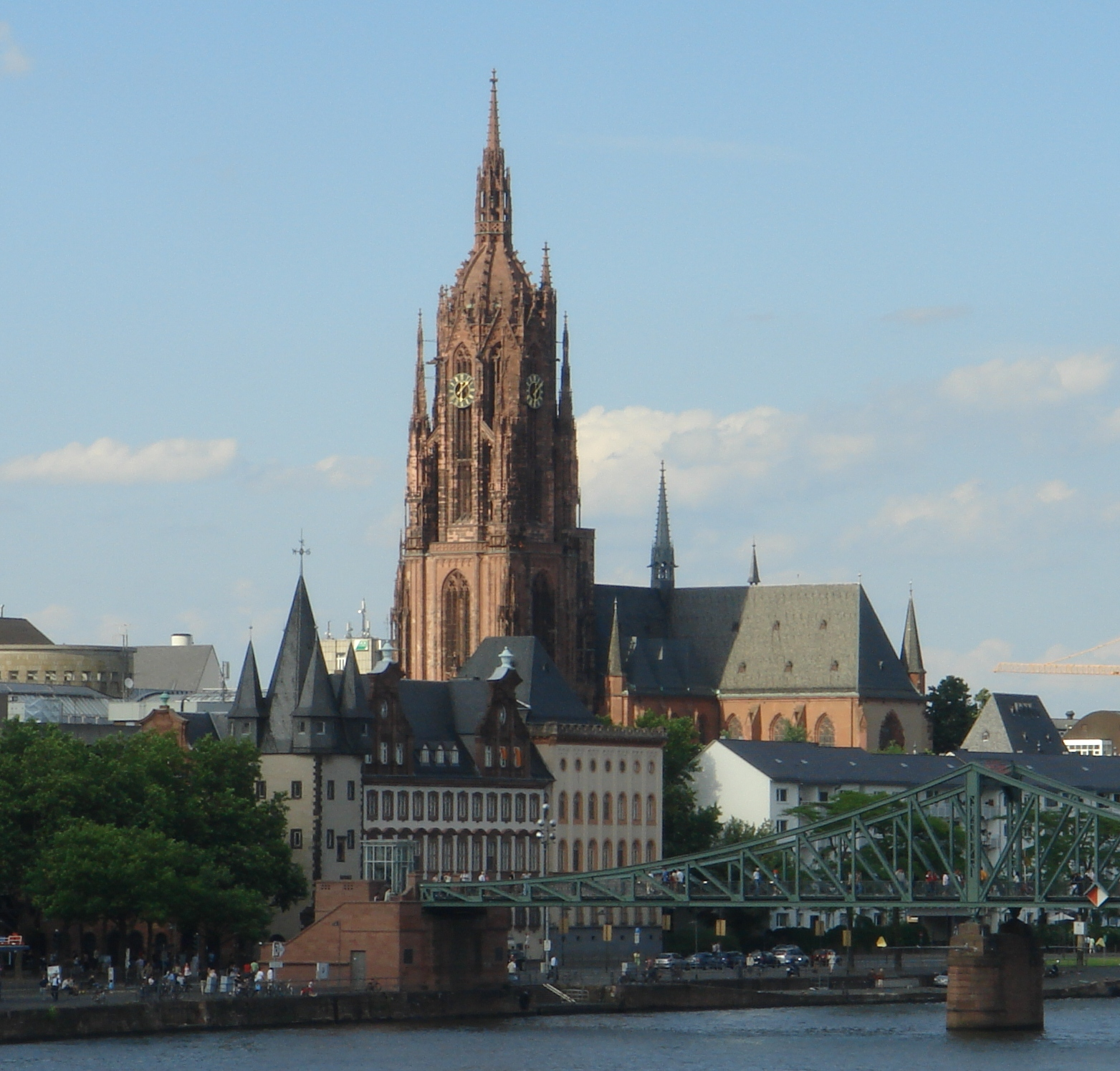
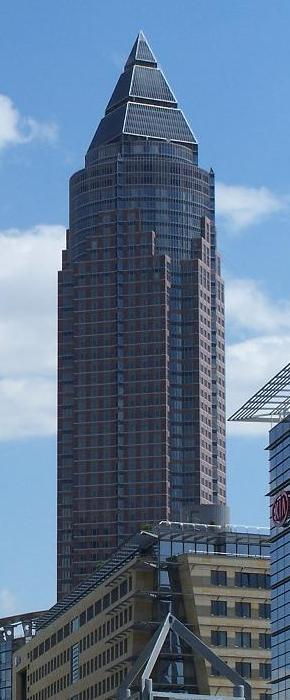
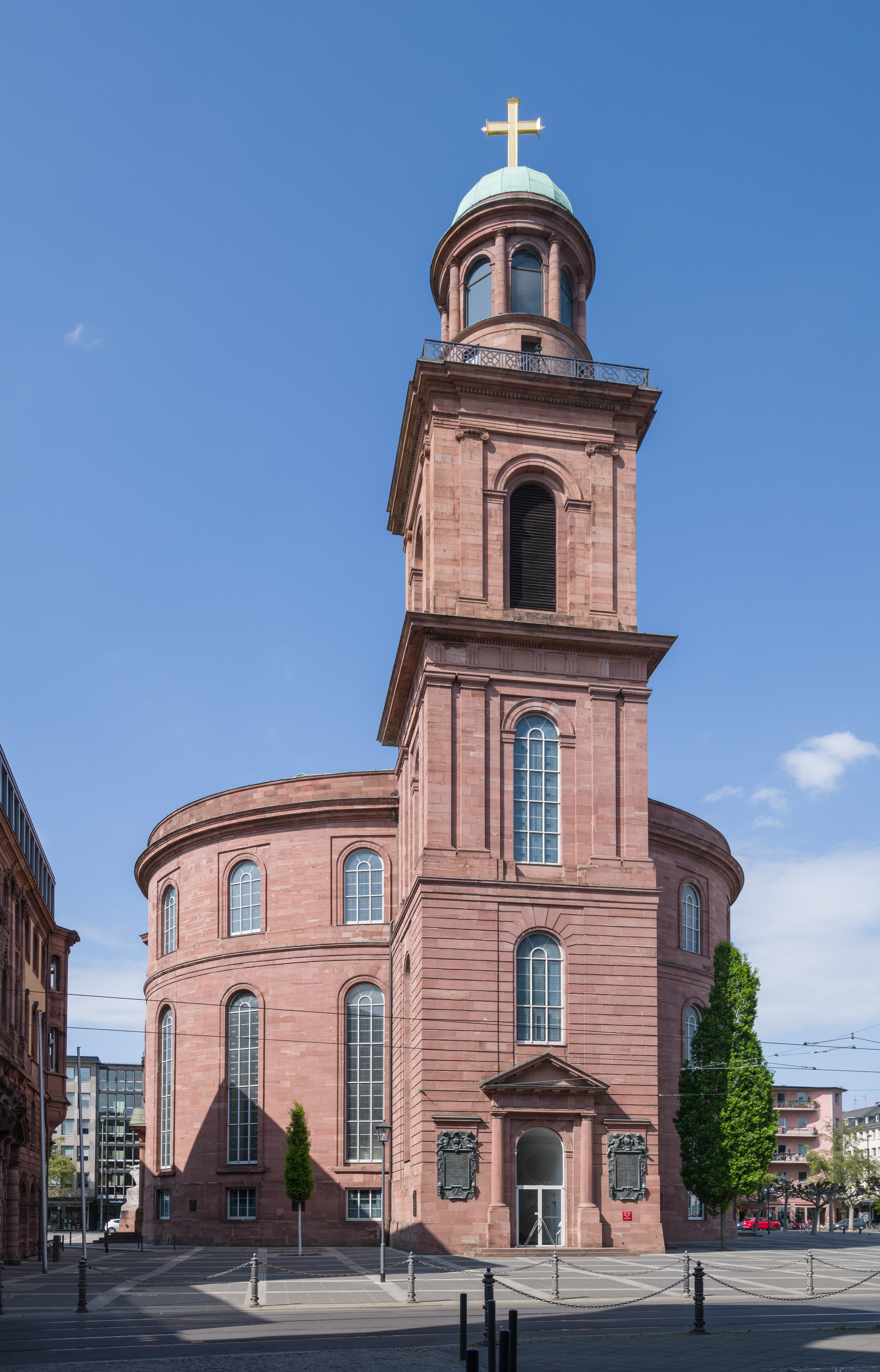
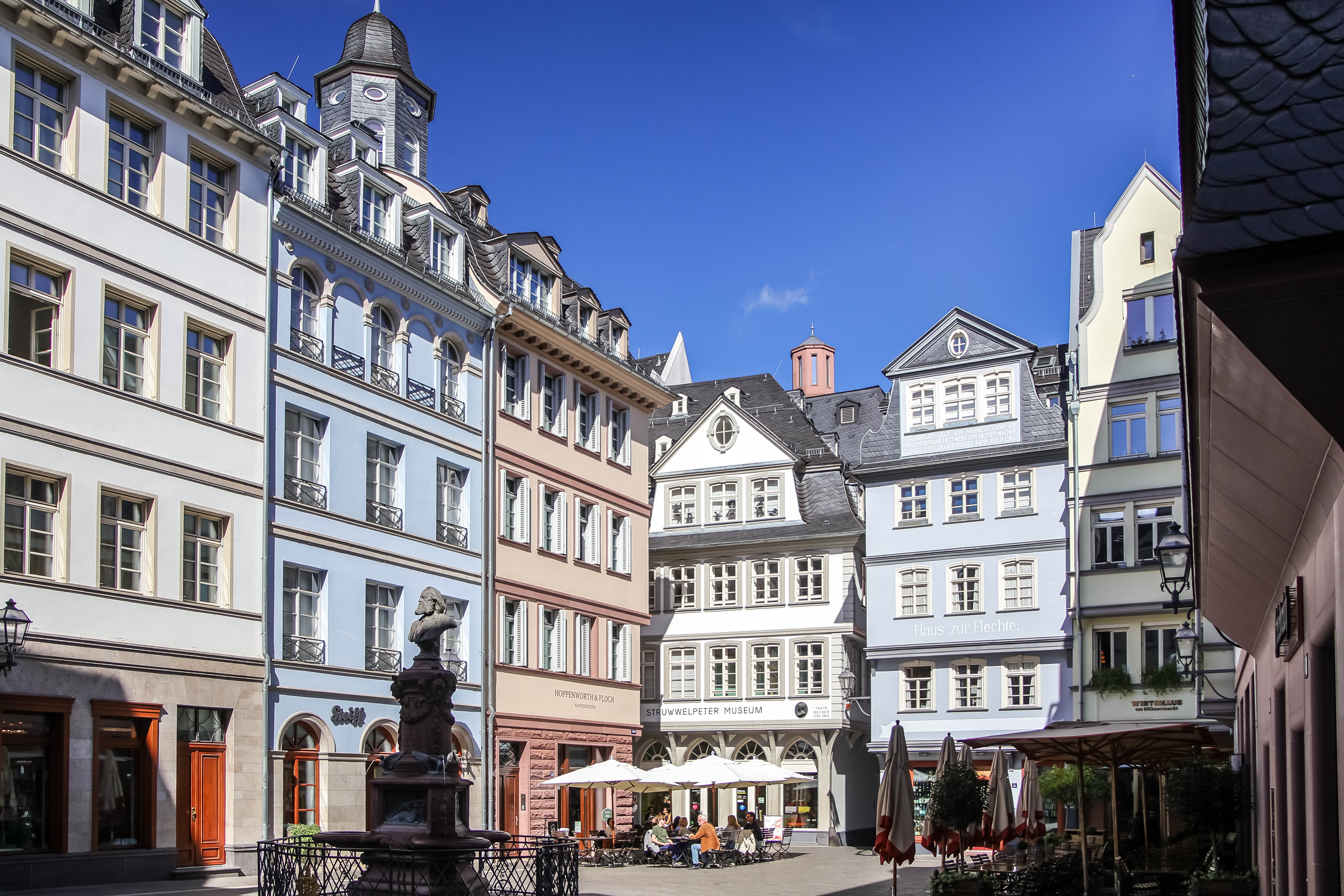
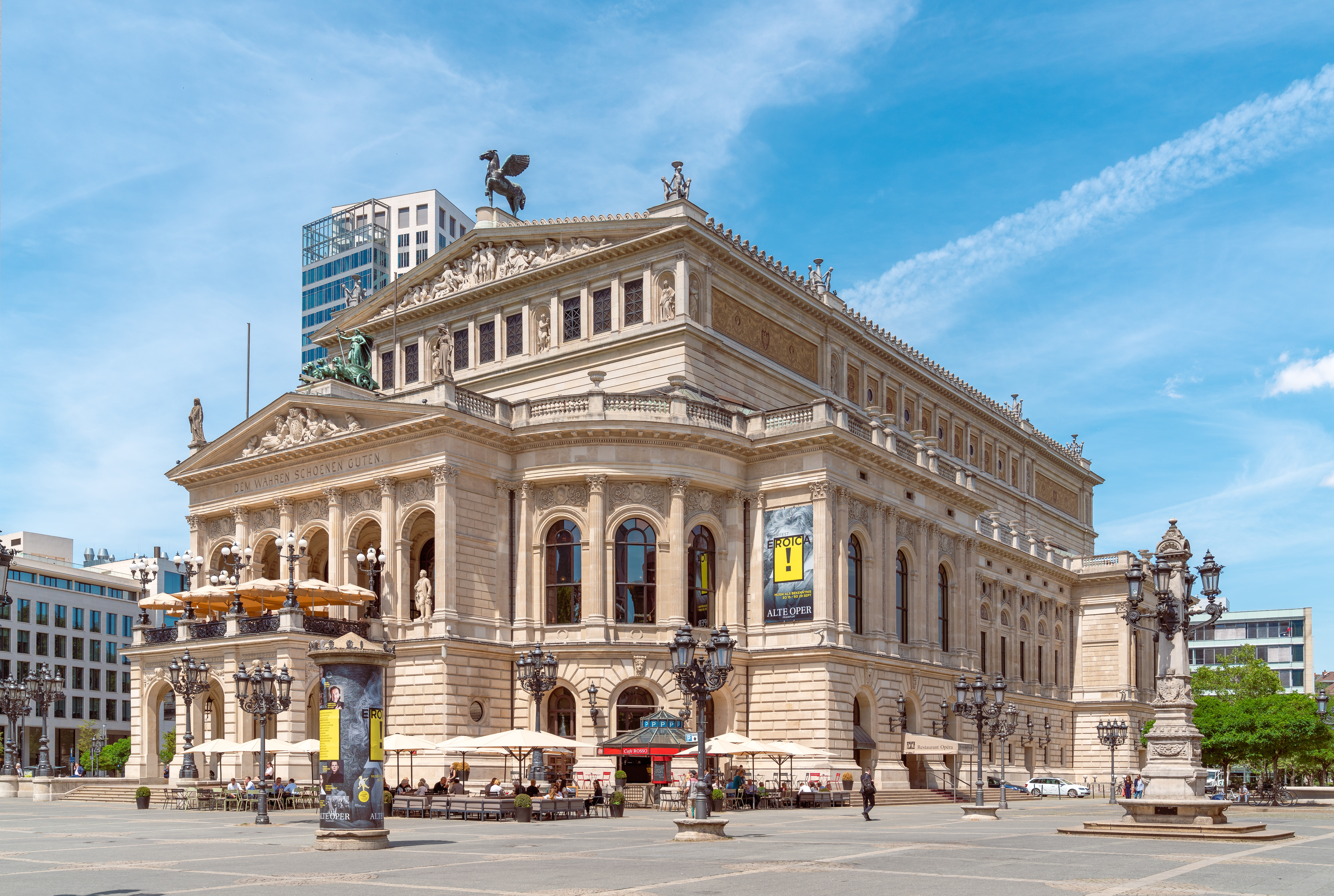
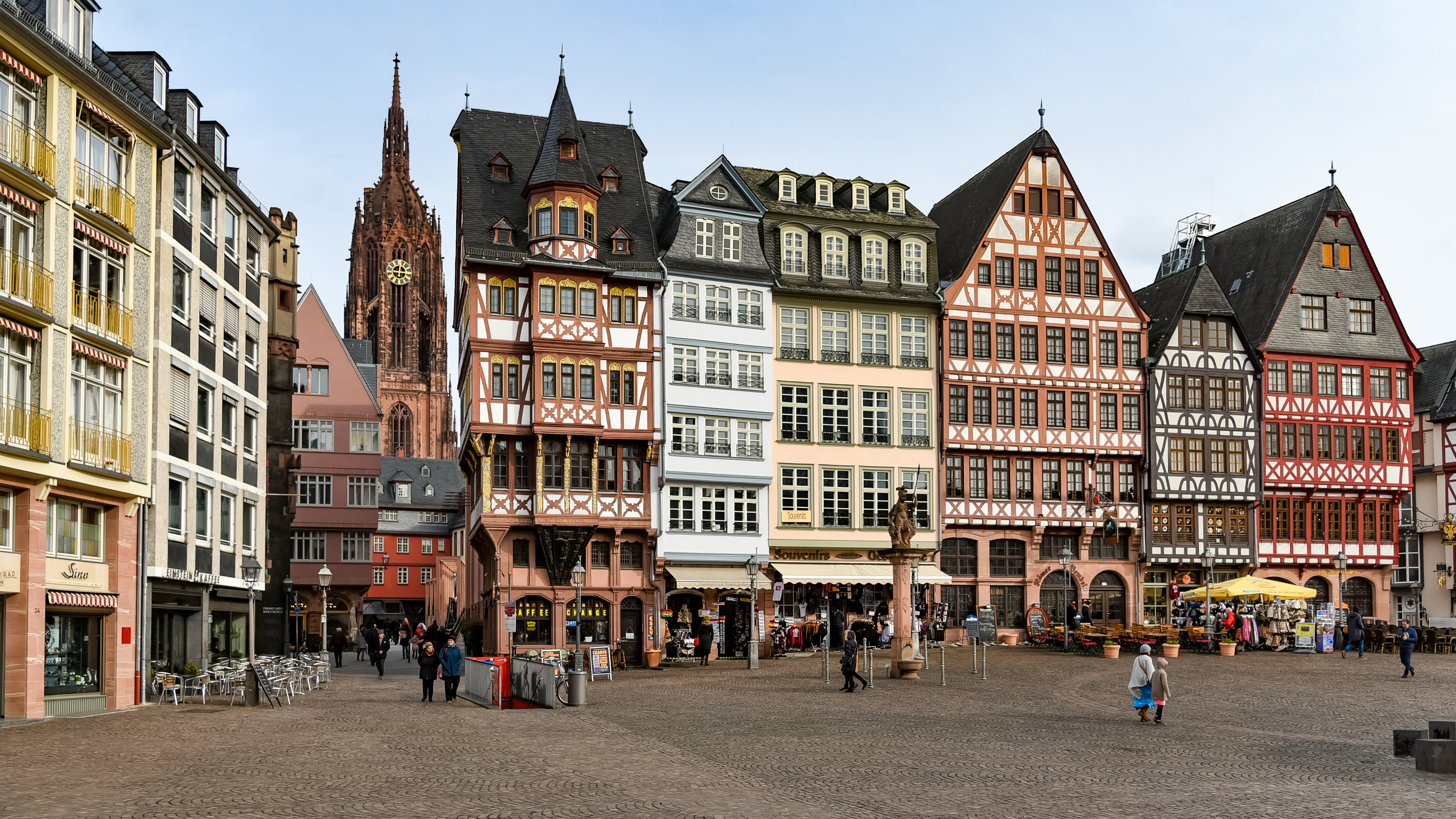
- Skyline with Taunus and Europaturm Cathedral Messeturm St. Paul's Church Dom-Römer Quarter Alte Oper Römerberg

- Flag Coat of arms

- Location of Frankfurt am Main within Hesse
- Interactive map of Frankfurt am Main
- Location within Germany Location within Hesse
- Coordinates: 50°06′38″N 08°40′56″E
- Country: Germany
- State: Hesse
- Admin. region: Darmstadt
- District: Urban district
- Founded: 1st century
- Subdivisions: 16 area districts (Ortsbezirke); 46 city districts (Stadtteile)

Government
  - Mayor: Mike Josef (SPD)
  - Governing parties: Greens/ SPD/ FDP/ Volt

Area
  - City: 248.31 km^{2} (95.87 sq mi)
- Elevation: 112 m (367 ft)

Population (2025-12-31)
  - City: 760,656 (5th)
  - Density: 3,063.3/km^{2} (7,934.0/sq mi)
  - Urban: 2,319,029
  - Metro: 5,604,523
- Time zone: UTC+01:00 (CET)
  - Summer (DST): UTC+02:00 (CEST)
- Postal codes: 60306–60599, 65929–65936
- Dialling codes: 069, 06101, 06109
- Vehicle registration: F
- Website: frankfurt.de

Frankfurt am Main, (Note: /ˈfræŋk.fɜːrt/ FRANK-furt, US also /ˈfræŋk.fʊərt/ FRANK-foort; German: [ˈfʁaŋkfʊʁt ʔam ˈmaɪn]; Hessian: Frangford am Maa [ˈfʁɑŋfɔɐ̯t am ˈmãː].) usually shortened to Frankfurt, is the most populous city in the German state of Hesse. Its 778,589 inhabitants as of 2025 make it the fifth-most populous city in Germany. (Note: After Berlin, Hamburg, Munich and Cologne) Located in the foreland of the Taunus on its namesake river Main, the city forms a continuous conurbation with Offenbach; its urban area has a population of more than 2.7 million. Frankfurt is the heart of the larger Rhine-Main metropolitan region, which has a population of more than 5.8 million and is Germany's fourth-largest metropolitan region after the Rhine-Ruhr region, the Berlin/Brandenburg Metropolitan Region and the Munich Metropolitan Region. Home to the European Central Bank, the city serves as one of the four institutional seats of the European Union. Frankfurt is classified by the GaWC as an Alpha world city.

Frankfurt was first mentioned in a document in 794 and has been an imperial city since 1372. Frankfurt was a city state, the Free City of Frankfurt, for nearly five centuries, and was one of the most important cities of the Holy Roman Empire, as a site of Imperial coronations; it lost its sovereignty upon the collapse of the empire in 1806, regained it in 1815 and then lost it again in 1866, when it was annexed by the Kingdom of Prussia following the Austro-Prussian War. It has been part of the state of Hesse since 1945. Frankfurt is culturally, ethnically and religiously diverse, with half of its population, and a majority of its young people, having a migrant background. A quarter of the population consists of foreign nationals, including many expatriates. In 2015, Frankfurt was home to 1,909 ultra high-net-worth individuals, the sixth-highest number of any city.

Frankfurt is a global hub for commerce, culture, education, tourism and transportation, and is the site of many global and European corporate headquarters. Due to its central location in former West Germany, Frankfurt Airport became the busiest in Germany, one of the busiest in the world, the airport with the most direct routes in the world, and the primary hub for Lufthansa, the national airline of Germany and Europe's largest airline. Frankfurt Central Station is Germany's second-busiest railway station after Hamburg Hbf, operated by Deutsche Bahn, the world's largest railway company, whose Frankfurter division DB InfraGO manages the largest railway network in Europe. Frankfurter Kreuz is the most-heavily used interchange in the EU. Frankfurt is one of the major financial and business centers of Europe, with the headquarters of the European Central Bank, Deutsche Bundesbank, Frankfurt Stock Exchange, Deutsche Bank, DZ Bank, KfW, Commerzbank, DekaBank, Helaba, several cloud and fintech startups, and other institutes. Automotive, technology and research, services, consulting, media and creative industries complement the economic base. Frankfurt's DE-CIX is the world's largest internet exchange point. Messe Frankfurt is one of the world's largest trade fairs. Other major fairs include the Music Fair and the Frankfurt Book Fair, the world's largest book fair. The city also has 93 consulates, among which the largest is the US Consulate General.

Frankfurt is home to influential educational institutions, including the Goethe University with the Universitätsklinikum Frankfurt (Hesse's largest hospital), the FUAS, the FUMPA, and graduate schools like the FSFM. The city is one of two seats of the German National Library (alongside Leipzig), the largest library in the German-speaking countries and one of the largest in the world. Its renowned cultural venues include the concert hall Alte Oper, continental Europe's largest English theater and many museums, including the Städel, Liebieghaus, German Film Museum, Senckenberg Natural History Museum, Goethe House and Schirn art venue. Frankfurt's skyline is shaped by some of Europe's tallest skyscrapers, which has led to the term Mainhattan.

The city has many parks and major botanical gardens. Roughly 52% of the city area is green. Frankfurt is a founding member of the Climate Alliance of European Cities and has pledged to work reducing carbon emissions by 50% by 2030. Frankfurt is the seat of the German Football Association, is home to the first division association football club Eintracht Frankfurt, the Löwen Frankfurt ice hockey team, and the basketball club Frankfurt Skyliners, and is the venue of the Frankfurt Marathon and the Ironman Germany.

== Etymology ==
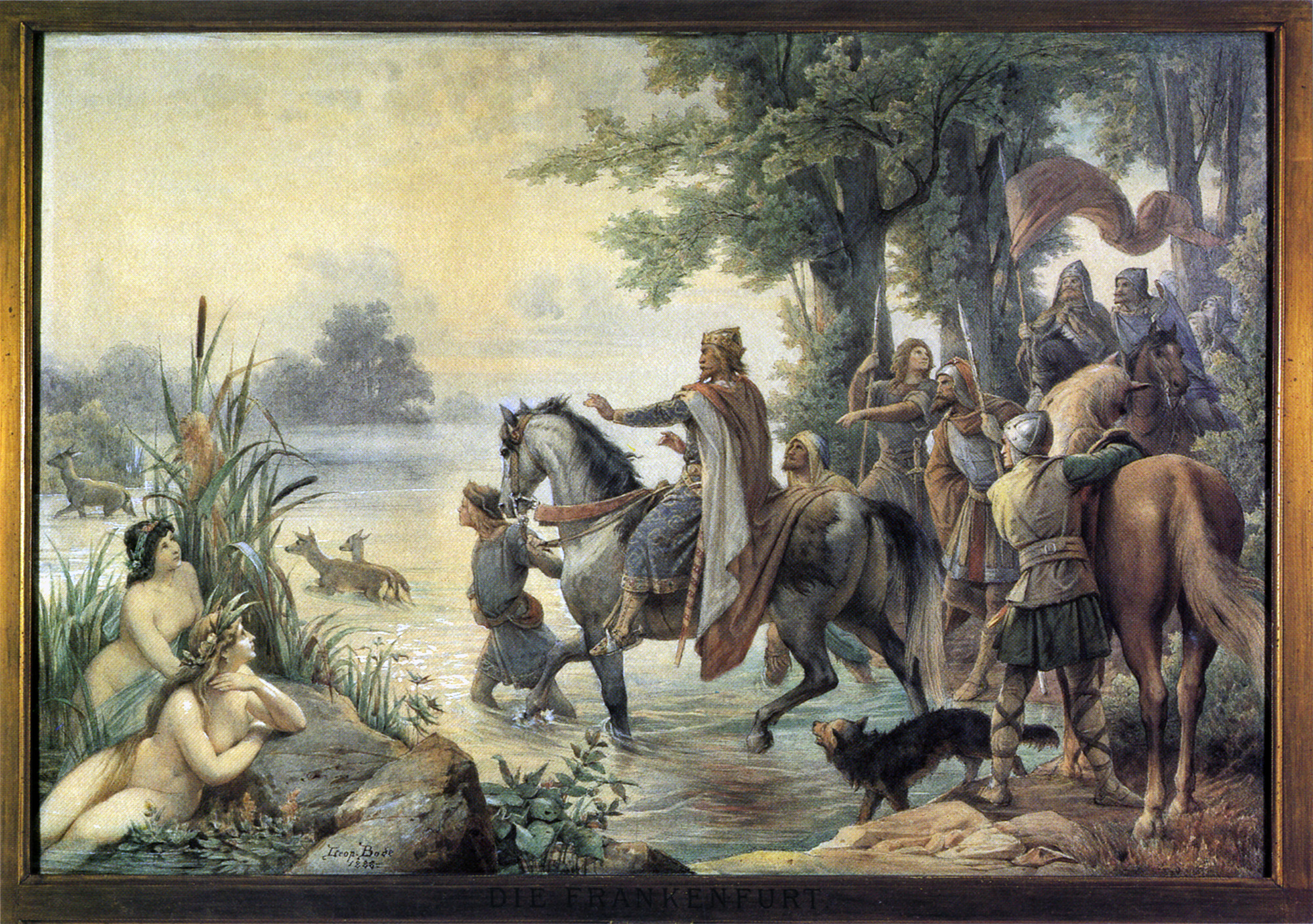
"The Discovery of Frankfurt by Charlemagne" by Leopold Bode (1888)

Frankonovurd (in Old High German) or Vadum Francorum (in Latin) were the first names mentioned in written records from 794. It transformed to Frankenfort during the Middle Ages and then to Franckfort and Franckfurth in the modern era. The name is derived from the Franconofurd, from the Germanic tribe of the Franks and Furt (cf. English ford) where the river was shallow enough to be crossed on foot.

Thietmar of Merseburg in the 11th century reported a founding legend in which Charlemagne and his army of Franks discovered the ford at Frankfurt when a doe crossed over it, showing them the way; in honor of this, the city was named "ford of the Franks". By the 19th century, the name Frankfurt had been established as the official spelling. The older English spelling of Frankfort is now rarely seen in reference to Frankfurt am Main, although more than a dozen other towns and cities, mainly in the United States, use this spelling, including Frankfort, Kentucky, Frankfort, New York, and Frankfort, Illinois. The New York Times first used the Frankfurt spelling for Frankfurt am Main on 24 October 1953 and last used the Frankfort spelling on 10 June 1954.

The suffix am Main has been used regularly since the 14th century. In English, the city's full name of Frankfurt am Main means "Frankfurt on the Main" (pronounced like English mine or German mein). Frankfurt is located on an ancient ford (German: Furt) on the river Main. As a part of early Franconia, the inhabitants were the early Franks, thus the city's name reveals its legacy as "the ford of the Franks on the Main".

Among English speakers, the city is commonly known simply as Frankfurt, but Germans occasionally call it by its full name to distinguish it from the other (significantly smaller) German city of Frankfurt an der Oder in the Land of Brandenburg on the Polish border. The common abbreviations for the city, primarily used in railway services and on road signs, are Frankfurt (Main), Frankfurt (M), Frankfurt a. M., Frankfurt/Main or Frankfurt/M. The common abbreviation for the name of the city is "FFM". Also in use is "FRA", the IATA code for Frankfurt Airport.

== History ==
=== Early history and Holy Roman Empire ===
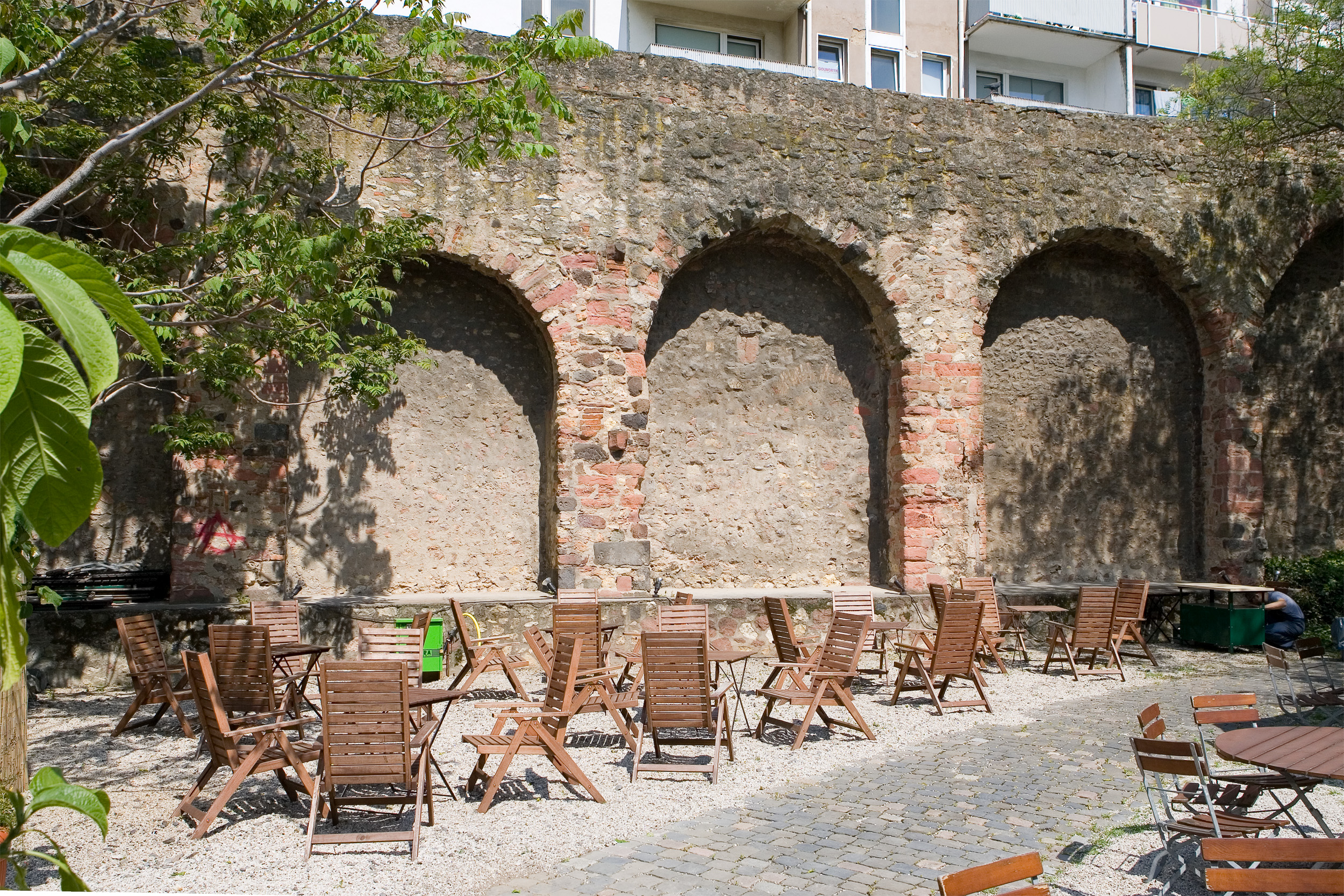
Remains of the medieval city wall

At the western borders of Frankfurt lies the Kapellenberg as part of the Taunus with one of the first Stone Age cities in Europe. The Celts had different settlements in the Taunus mountains north of Frankfurt, the biggest one the Heidetrank Oppidum. The first traces of Roman settlements established in the area of the river Nidda date to the reign of Emperor Vespasian in the years 69 to 79 AD. Nida (modern Heddernheim, Praunheim) was a Roman civitas capital (Civitas Taunensium).

Alemanni and Franks lived there, and by 794, Charlemagne presided over an imperial assembly and church synod, at which Franconofurd (alternative spellings end with -furt and -vurd) was first mentioned. It was one of the two capitals of Charlemagne's grandson Louis the German, together with Regensburg. Louis founded the collegiate church, rededicated in 1239 to Bartholomew the Apostle and now Frankfurt Cathedral.

Frankfurt was one of the most important cities in the Holy Roman Empire. From 855, the German kings were elected and crowned in Aachen. In 1372, Frankfurt became a Reichsstadt (Imperial Free City) and was as such directly subordinate to the Holy Roman Emperor rather than a regional ruler or a local nobleman. From 1562 onward the kings and emperors were crowned and elected in Frankfurt, starting with Maximilian II. This tradition ended in 1792, when Francis II was elected. His coronation was deliberately held on 14 July Bastille Day, the anniversary of the storming of the Bastille. The elections and coronations took place in St. Bartholomäus Cathedral, known as the Kaiserdom (Imperial Cathedral), or the four other structures known to have existed at this location. The cathedral spire was constructed according to plans by Madern Gerthener in 1415 and is 95 meters tall.

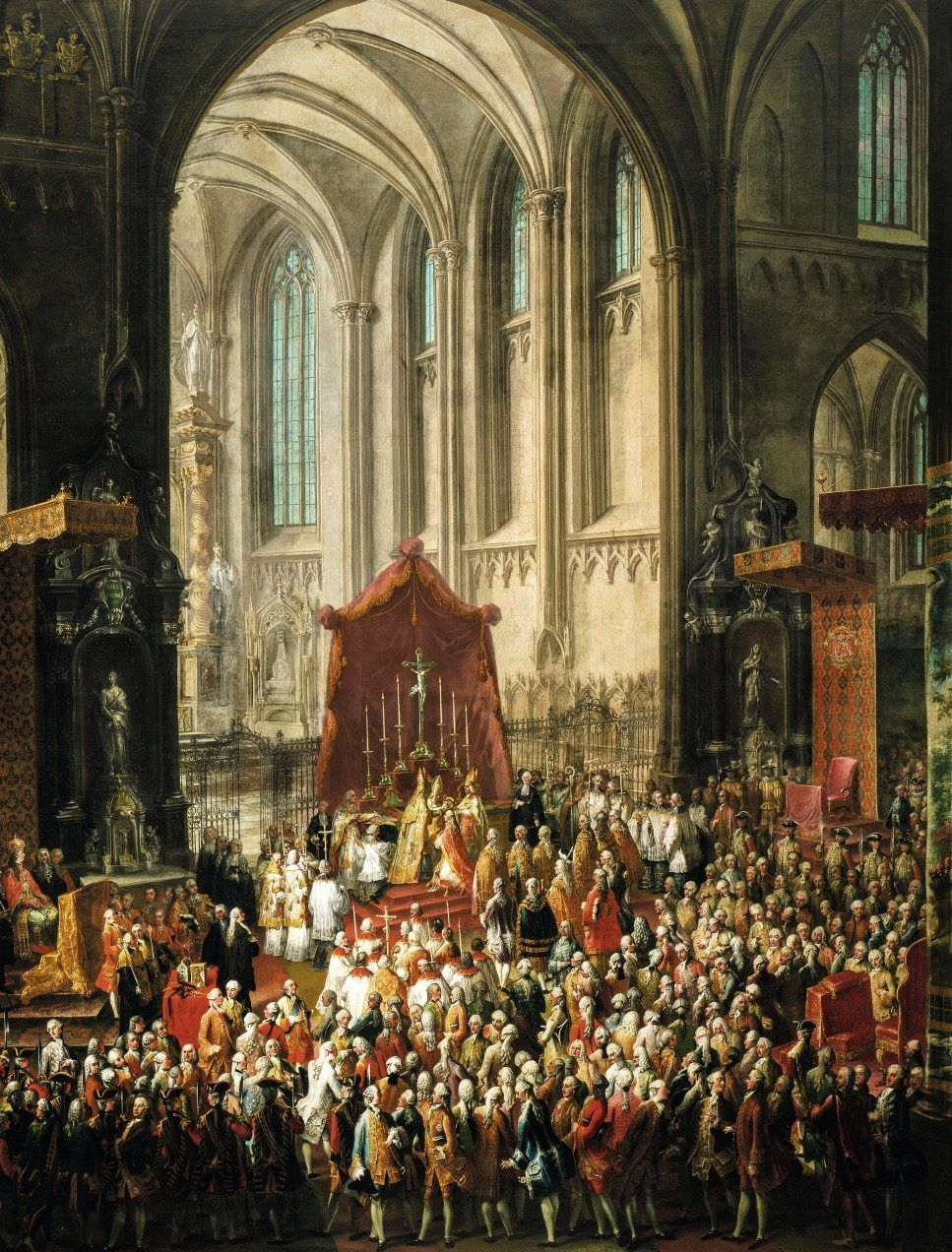
Coronation of Archduke Joseph in Frankfurt Cathedral, 3 April 1764

The Messe Frankfurt ('Frankfurt Trade Fair') was first mentioned in 1150. In 1240, Emperor Frederick II granted an imperial privilege to its visitors, meaning they would be protected by the empire. The fair became particularly important when similar fairs in French Beaucaire lost attraction around 1380. Book trade fairs began in 1478. In 1585, Frankfurt traders established a system of exchange rates for the various currencies that were circulating to prevent cheating and extortion. Therein lay the early roots for the Frankfurt Stock Exchange.

Frankfurt managed to remain neutral during the Thirty Years' War, but suffered from the bubonic plague that refugees brought to the city. After the war, Frankfurt regained its wealth. In the late 1770s the theater principal Abel Seyler was based in Frankfurt, and established the city's theatrical life.

=== Impact of French revolution and the Napoleonic Wars ===
Following the French Revolution, Frankfurt was occupied or bombarded several times by French troops. It remained a Free city until the collapse of the Holy Roman Empire in 1805/6.
In 1806, it became part of the principality of Aschaffenburg under the Fürstprimas (Prince-Primate), Karl Theodor Anton Maria von Dalberg. This meant that Frankfurt was incorporated into the Confederation of the Rhine. In 1810, Dalberg adopted the title of a Grand Duke of Frankfurt. Napoleon intended to make his adopted son Eugène de Beauharnais, already Prince de Venise ("prince of Venice", a newly established primogeniture in Italy), Grand Duke of Frankfurt after Dalberg's death (since the latter as a Catholic bishop had no legitimate heirs). The Grand Duchy remained a short episode lasting from 1810 to 1813 when the military tide turned in favor of the Anglo-Prussian-led allies that overturned the Napoleonic order (→ Battle of the Nations). Dalberg abdicated in favor of Eugène de Beauharnais, which of course was only a symbolic action, as the latter effectively never ruled after the ruin of the French armies and Frankfurt's takeover by the allies.

=== Frankfurt as a fully sovereign state ===
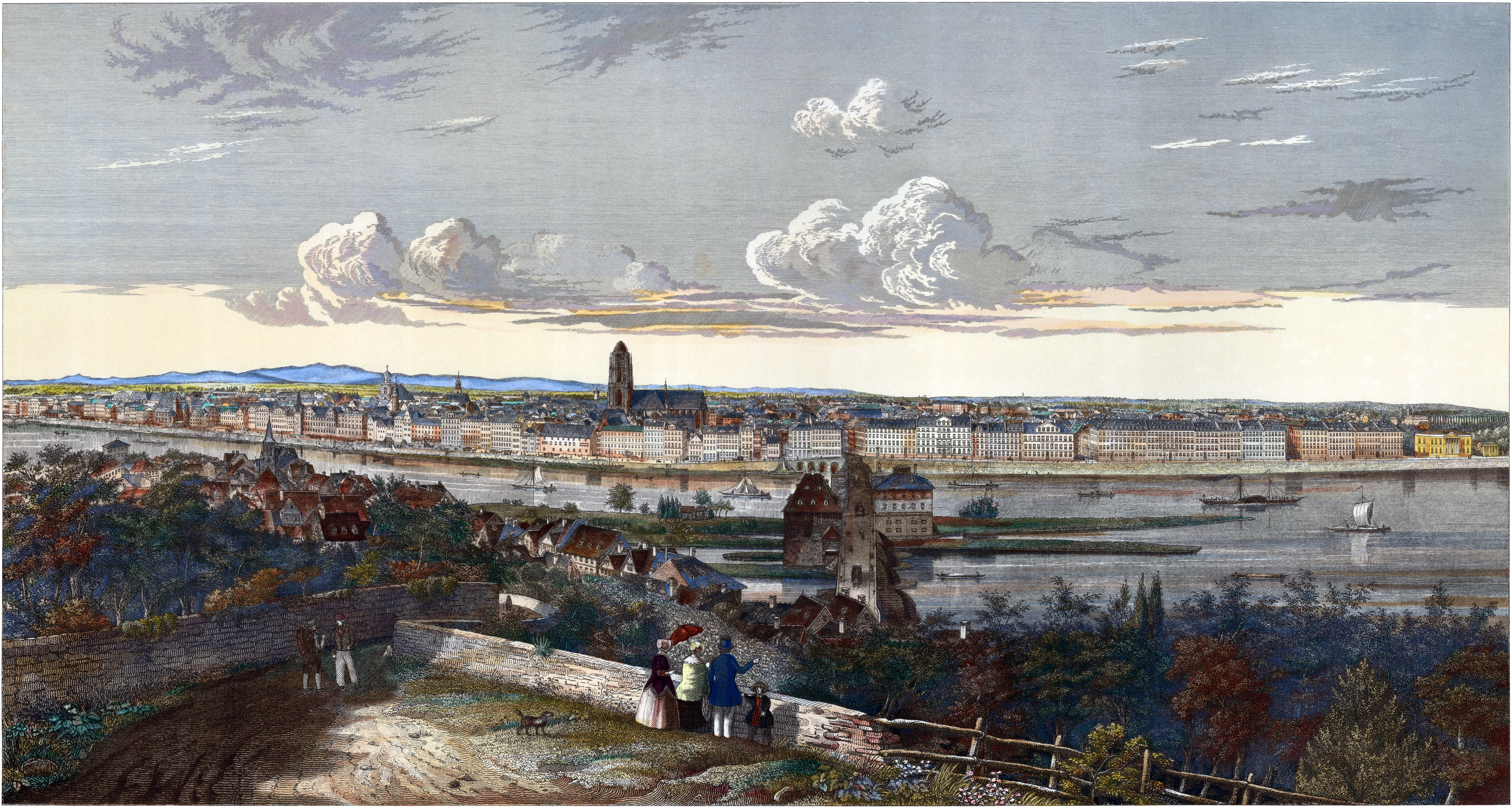
View of Frankfurt am Main from Sachsenhaeuser Berg (Mountain of Sachsenhausen) showing the spire of Frankfurt Cathedral in 1845

After Napoleon's final defeat and abdication, the Congress of Vienna (1814–1815) dissolved the grand-duchy and Frankfurt became a fully sovereign city-state with a republican form of government. Frankfurt entered the newly founded German Confederation (till 1866) as a free city, becoming the seat of its Bundestag, the confederal parliament where the nominally presiding Habsburg Emperor of Austria was represented by an Austrian "presidential envoy".

After the ill-fated revolution of 1848, Frankfurt was the seat of the first democratically elected German parliament, the Frankfurt Parliament, which met in the Frankfurter Paulskirche (St. Paul's Church) and was opened on 18 May 1848. In the year of its existence, the assembly developed a common constitution for a unified Germany (Frankfurt Constitution), with the Prussian king as its monarch. The institution failed in 1849 when the Prussian king, Frederick William IV, declared that he would not accept "a crown from the gutter".

=== Frankfurt after the loss of sovereignty ===
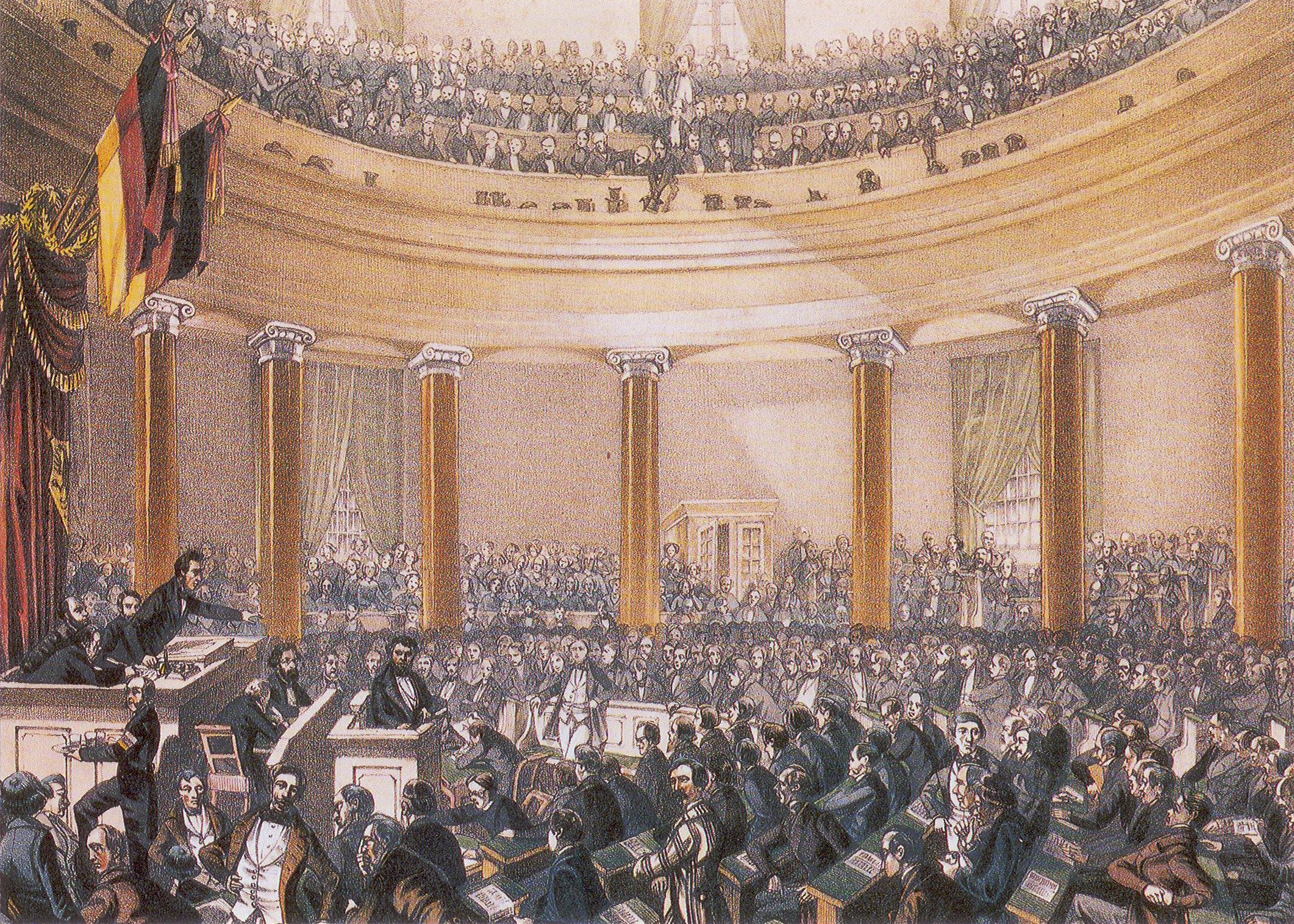
The Frankfurt Parliament at St. Paul's Church in 1848

Frankfurt lost its independence following the Austro-Prussian War of 1866, when Prussia annexed several smaller states, including the Free City of Frankfurt. The city was subsequently incorporated into the Prussian province of Hesse-Nassau. The occupation and annexation were widely regarded in Frankfurt as a grave injustice, yet the city retained its distinctly Western European, urban, and cosmopolitan character. The formerly independent towns of Bornheim and Bockenheim were incorporated in 1890.

In 1914, the citizens founded the University of Frankfurt, later named Goethe University Frankfurt. This marked the only civic foundation of a university in Germany; today it is one of Germany's largest.

From 6 April to 17 May 1920, following military intervention to put down the Ruhr uprising, Frankfurt was occupied by French troops. The French claimed that Articles 42 to 44 of the peace treaty of Versailles concerning the demilitarization of the Rhineland had been broken. In 1924, Ludwig Landmann became the first Jewish mayor of the city, and led a significant expansion during the following years. In 1933, the Nazi regime seized power. In November 1938, the regime ordered the Kristallnacht. The synagogues of Frankfurt were destroyed. Later, the vast majority of the Jewish population fled or was killed during the Holocaust.

During World War II, Frankfurt was the location of a Nazi prison for underage girls with several forced labour camps, a camp for Sinti and Romani people (see Romani Holocaust), the Dulag Luft West transit camp for Allied prisoners of war, and a subcamp of the Natzweiler-Struthof concentration camp.

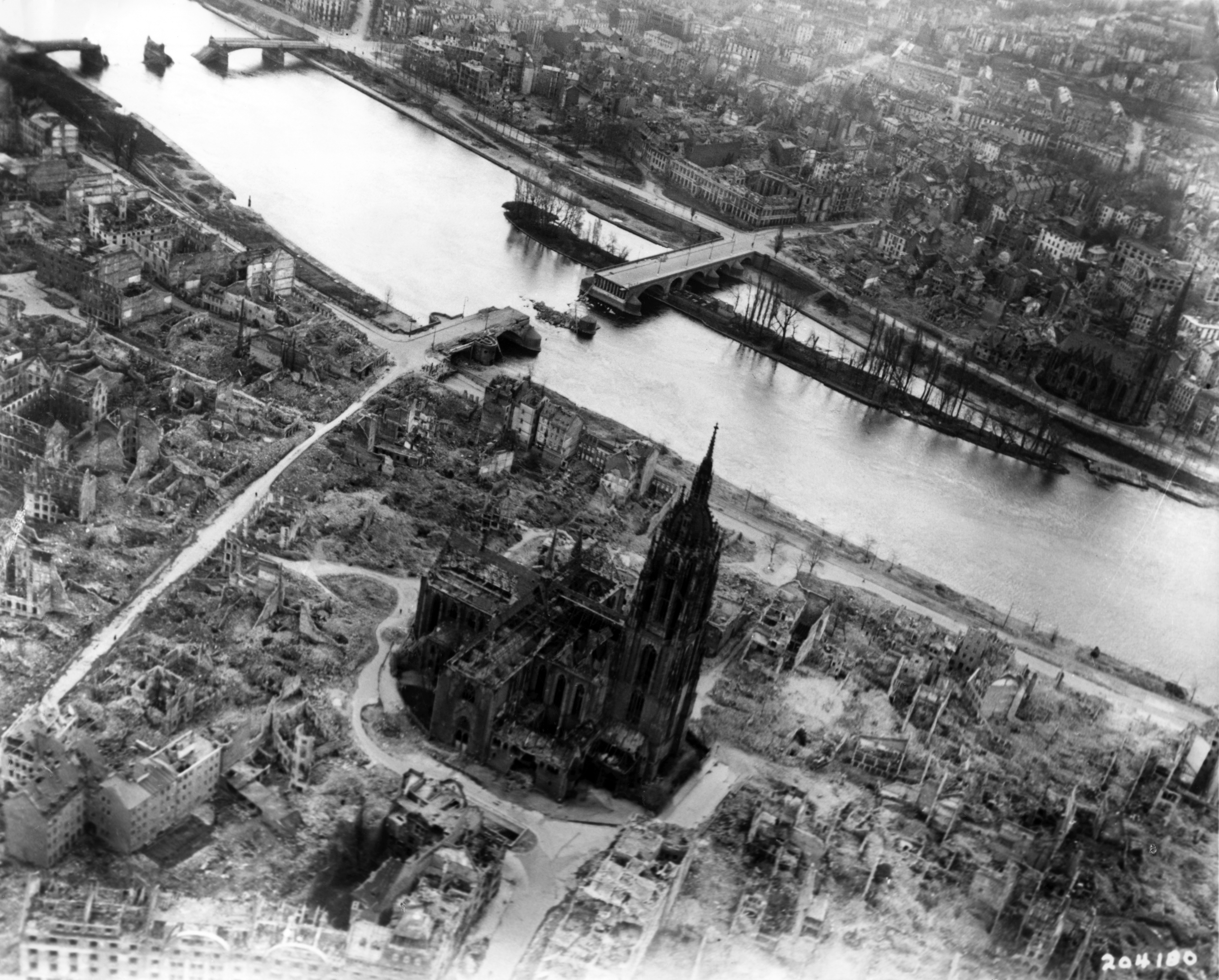
Aerial view of the cathedral in May 1945

Frankfurt was severely bombed in World War II (1939–1945). About 5,500 residents were killed during the raids, and the once-famous medieval city center, by that time one of the largest in Germany, was almost completely destroyed. It became a ground battlefield on 26 March 1945, when the West Allied advance into Germany was forced to take the city in contested urban combat that included a river assault. The 5th Infantry Division and the 6th Armored Division of the United States Army captured Frankfurt after several days of intense fighting, and it was declared largely secure on 29 March 1945. In spite of the wartime destruction, more than 40% of Frankfurt's buildings still date from before the Second World War.

After the end of the war, Frankfurt became a part of the newly founded state of Hesse, consisting of the old Hesse-(Darmstadt) and the Prussian Hesse provinces. The city was part of the American Zone of Occupation of Germany. The Military Governor for the United States Zone (1945–1949) and the United States High Commissioner for Germany (HICOG) (1949–1952) had their headquarters in the IG Farben Building, intentionally left undamaged by the Allies' wartime bombardment.

Frankfurt was the original choice for the provisional capital city of the newly founded state of West Germany in 1949. The city constructed a parliament building that was never used for its intended purpose (it housed the radio studios of Hessischer Rundfunk). In the end, Konrad Adenauer, the first postwar Chancellor, preferred the town of Bonn, for the most part because it was close to his hometown, but also because many other prominent politicians opposed the choice of Frankfurt out of concern that Frankfurt would be accepted as the permanent capital, thereby weakening the West German population's support for a reunification with East Germany and the eventual return of the capital to Berlin.

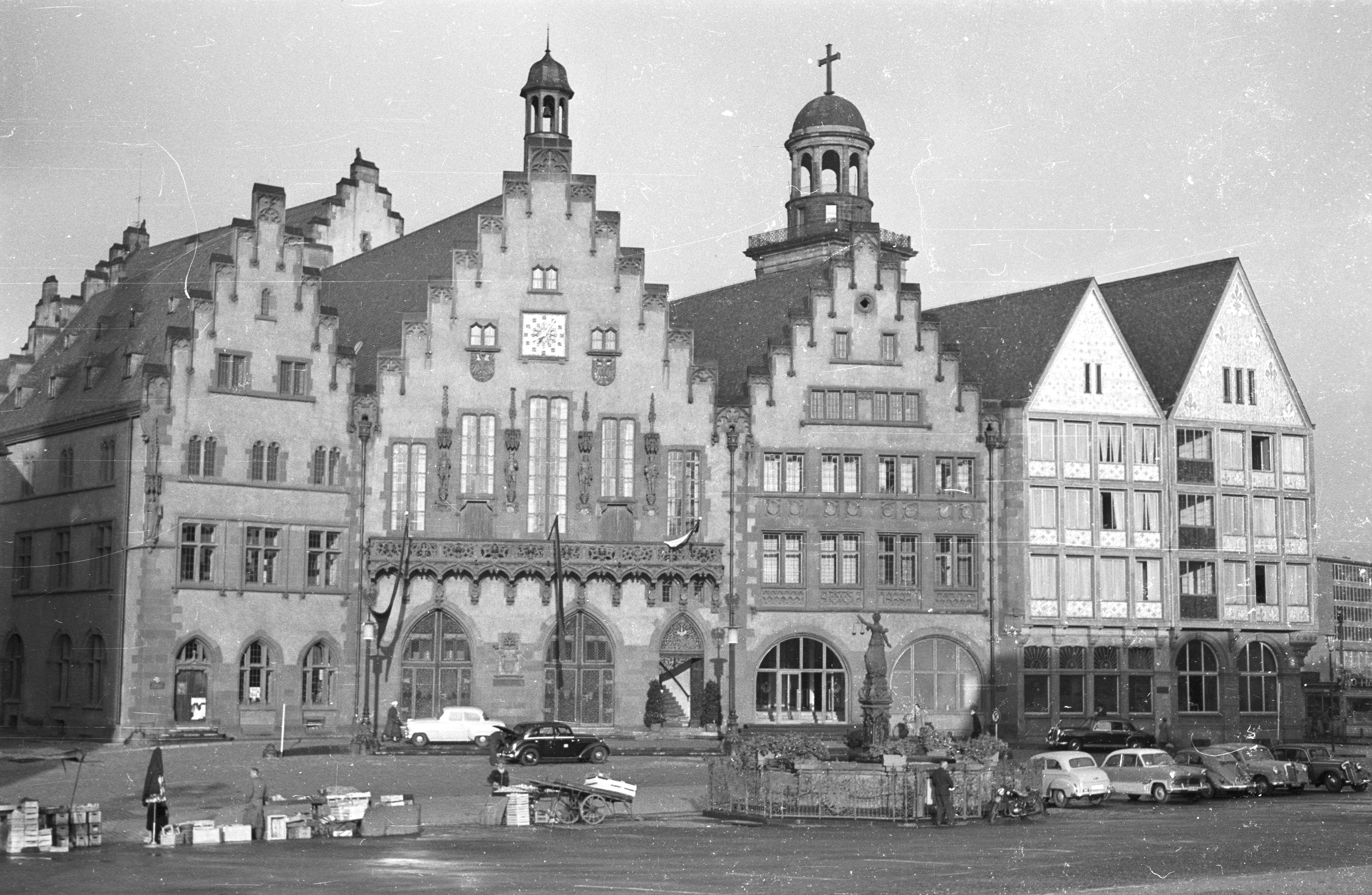
Reconstructed Römer in the 1950s

Postwar reconstruction took place in a sometimes simple modern style, thus changing Frankfurt's architectural face. A few landmark buildings were reconstructed historically, albeit in a simplified manner (e.g., Römer, St. Paul's Church, and Goethe House). The collection of historically significant Cairo Genizah documents of the Municipal Library was destroyed by the bombing. According to Arabist and Genizah scholar S.D. Goitein, "not even handlists indicating its contents have survived."

The end of the war marked Frankfurt's comeback as Germany's leading financial hub. In 1948, the Allies founded the Bank deutscher Länder, the forerunner of the Deutsche Bundesbank. Following this decision, more financial institutions were re-established, such as Deutsche Bank and Dresdner Bank. In the 1950s, Frankfurt Stock Exchange regained its position as the country's leading stock exchange. In 1998, the European Central Bank was founded in Frankfurt, followed by the European Insurance and Occupational Pensions Authority in 2011, and the Anti-Money Laundering Authority in 2024.

Frankfurt also reemerged as Germany's transportation hub and Frankfurt Airport became Europe's second-busiest airport behind London Heathrow Airport in 1961. During the 1970s, the city created one of Europe's most efficient underground transportation systems. That system includes a suburban rail system (S-Bahn) linking outlying communities with the city center, and a deep underground light rail system with smaller coaches (U-Bahn) also capable of travelling above ground on rails.

== Geography ==
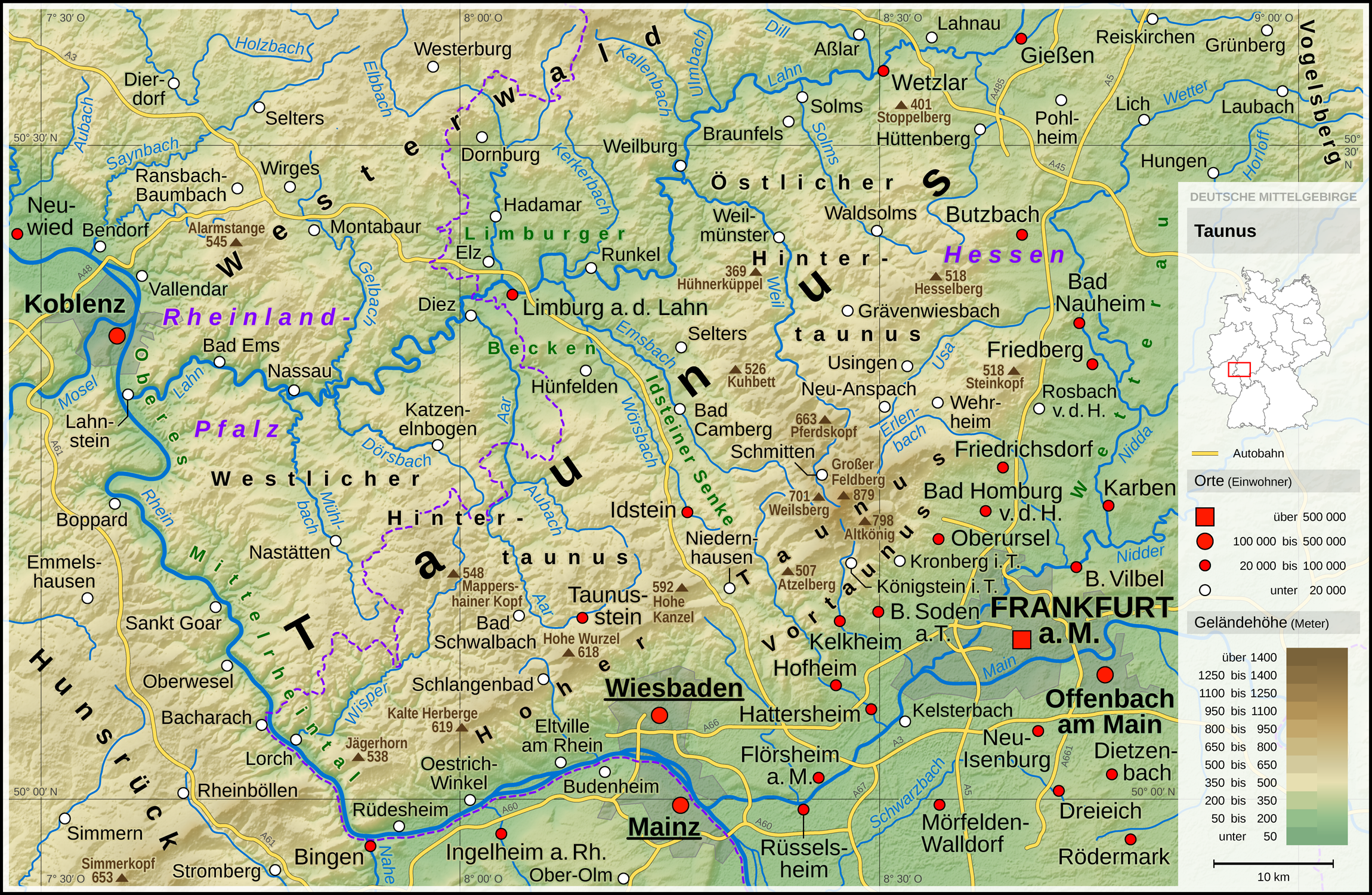
Frankfurt on the mouth of the Nidda into the Main, which flows into the Rhine between the Rhineland-Palatine capital of Mainz and the Hessian (historically Nassauian) capital of Wiesbaden. Also visible the Taunus suburbs of the districts of High Taunus and Main-Taunus, two of the wealthiest districts in Germany.

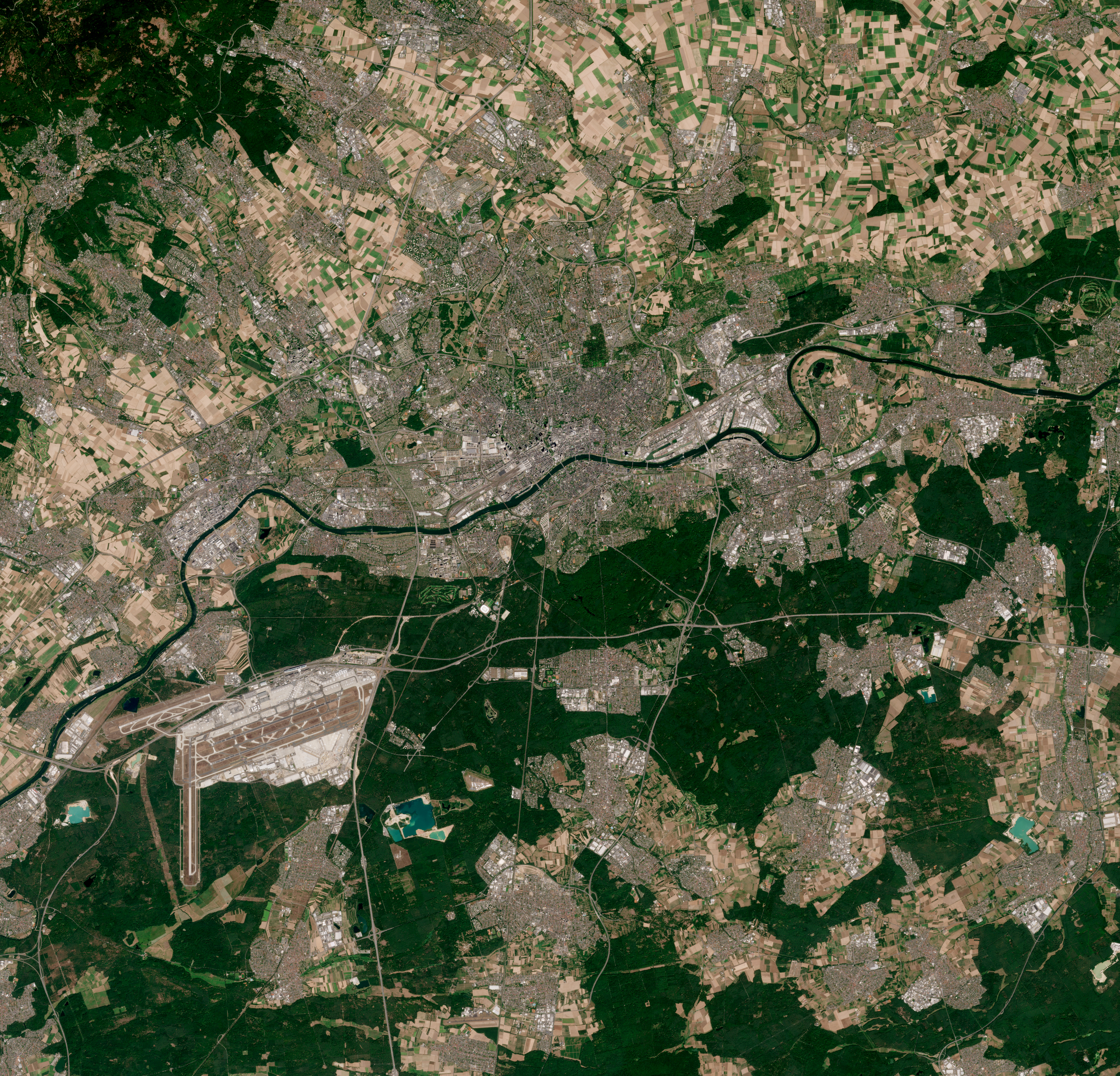
Frankfurt as seen by the European Space Agency's Sentinel-2A

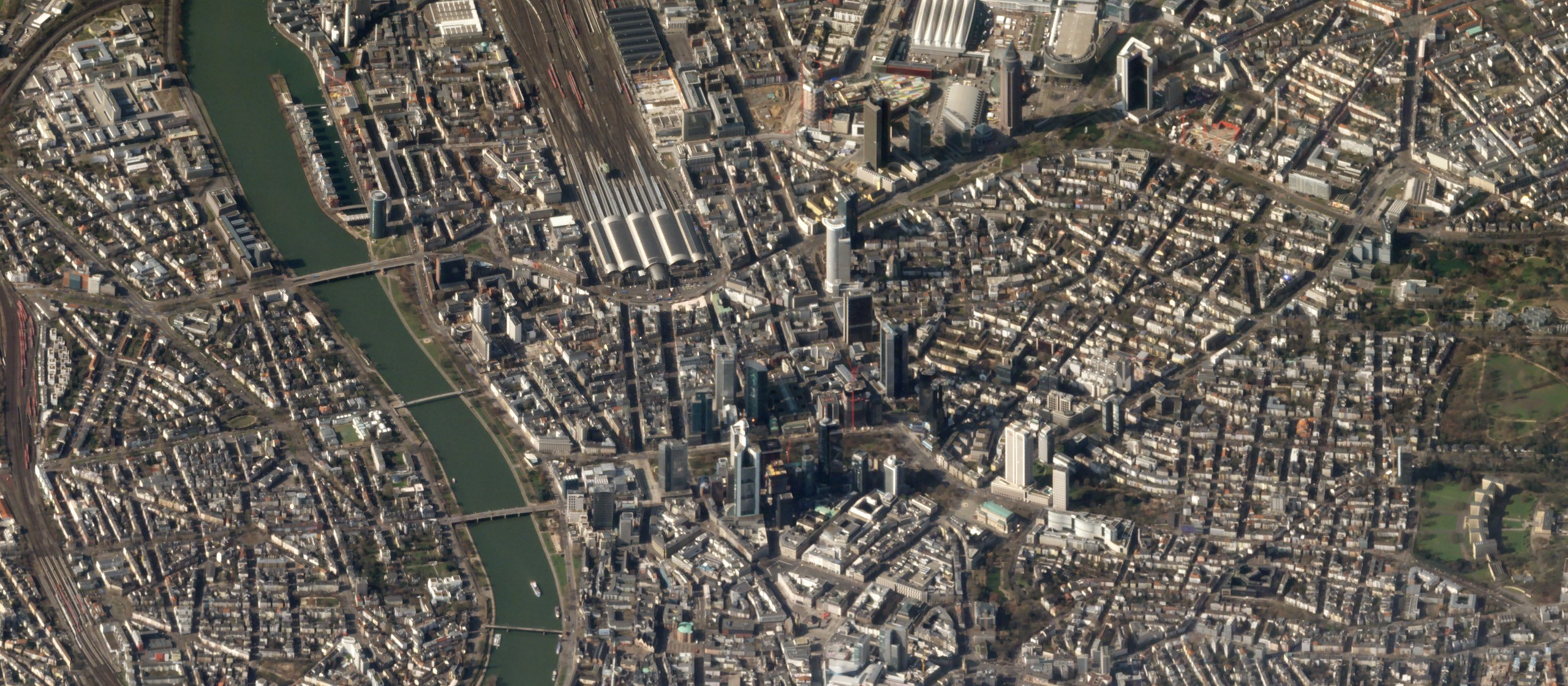
The central Innenstadt district, as seen by a SkySat satellite

Frankfurt is the largest city in the state of Hesse, located in the western part of Germany.

=== Site ===
Frankfurt is located on both sides of the river Main, south-east of the Taunus mountain range. The southern part of the city contains the Frankfurt City Forest, Germany's largest city forest. The city area is 248.31 km^{2} (95.87 sq mi) and extends over 23.4 km (14.54 mi) east to west and 23.3 km (14.48 mi) north to south. Its downtown is north of the river Main in Altstadt district (the historical center) and the surrounding Innenstadt district. The geographical center is in Bockenheim district near Frankfurt West station.

Frankfurt at the heart of the densely populated Frankfurt Rhine-Main Metropolitan Region with a population of 5.5 million. Other important cities in the region are Wiesbaden (capital of Hesse), Mainz (capital of Rhineland-Palatinate), Darmstadt, Offenbach am Main, Hanau, Aschaffenburg, Bad Homburg vor der Höhe, Rüsselsheim, Wetzlar and Marburg.

=== Districts ===
The 46 Stadtteile (city districts) of central Frankfurt, 2010

The city is divided into 46 city districts (Stadtteile), which are in turn divided into 121 city boroughs (Stadtbezirke) and 448 electoral districts (Wahlbezirke). The 46 city districts combine into 16 area districts (Ortsbezirke), which each have a district committee and chairperson.

The largest city district by population and area is Sachsenhausen, while the smallest is Altstadt, Frankfurt's historical center. Three larger city districts (Sachsenhausen, Westend and Nordend) are divided for administrative purposes into a northern (-Nord) and a southern (-Süd) part, respectively a western (-West) and an eastern (-Ost) part, but are generally considered as one city district (which is why often only 43 city districts are mentioned, even on the city's official website).

Some larger housing areas are often falsely called city districts, even by locals, like Nordweststadt (part of Niederursel, Heddernheim and Praunheim), Goldstein (part of Schwanheim), Riedberg (part of Kalbach-Riedberg) and Europaviertel (part of Gallus). The Bankenviertel (banking district), Frankfurt's financial district, is also not an administrative city district (it covers parts of the western Innenstadt district, the southern Westend district and the eastern Bahnhofsviertel district).

Many city districts are incorporated suburbs (Vororte) or were previously independent cities, such as Höchst. Some like Nordend and Westend arose during the rapid growth of the city in the Gründerzeit following the Unification of Germany, while others were formed from territory which previously belonged to other city district(s), such as Dornbusch and Riederwald.

=== History of incorporations ===
Until the year 1877 the city's territory consisted of the present-day inner-city districts of Altstadt, Innenstadt, Bahnhofsviertel, Gutleutviertel, Gallus, Westend, Nordend, Ostend and Sachsenhausen.

At the end of the 19th century the city of Frankfurt was enlarged. The central train station was built in 1888 to support the incorporation of existing population centers. Bornheim was incorporated in 1877, followed by Bockenheim in 1895. Seckbach, Niederrad and Oberrad followed on 1 July 1900. The Landkreis Frankfurt was finally dispersed on 1 April 1910, and therefore Berkersheim, Bonames, Eckenheim, Eschersheim, Ginnheim, Hausen, Heddernheim, Niederursel, Praunheim, Preungesheim and Rödelheim joined the city. In the same year a new city district, Riederwald, was created on territory that had formerly belonged to Seckbach and Ostend.

On 1 April 1928 the City of Höchst became part of Frankfurt, as well as its city districts Sindlingen, Unterliederbach and Zeilsheim. Simultaneously the Landkreis Höchst was dispersed with its member cities either joining Frankfurt (Fechenheim, Griesheim, Nied, Schwanheim, Sossenheim) or joining the newly established Landkreis of Main-Taunus-Kreis. Dornbusch became a city district in 1946. It was created on territory that had formerly belonged to Eckenheim and Ginnheim.

On 1 August 1972, Hesse's smaller suburbs of Harheim, Kalbach, Nieder-Erlenbach, and Nieder-Eschbach became districts while other neighboring suburbs chose to join the Main-Taunus-Kreis, the Landkreis Offenbach, the Kreis Groß-Gerau, the Hochtaunuskreis, the Main-Kinzig-Kreis or the Wetteraukreis. Bergen-Enkheim was the last suburb to become part of Frankfurt on 1 January 1977.

Flughafen became an official city district in 1979. It covers the area of Frankfurt Airport that had belonged to Sachsenhausen and the neighboring city of Mörfelden-Walldorf.

Frankfurt's youngest city district is Frankfurter Berg. It was part of Bonames until 1996. Kalbach was officially renamed Kalbach-Riedberg in 2006 because of the large residential housing development in the area known as Riedberg.

=== Neighboring districts and cities ===
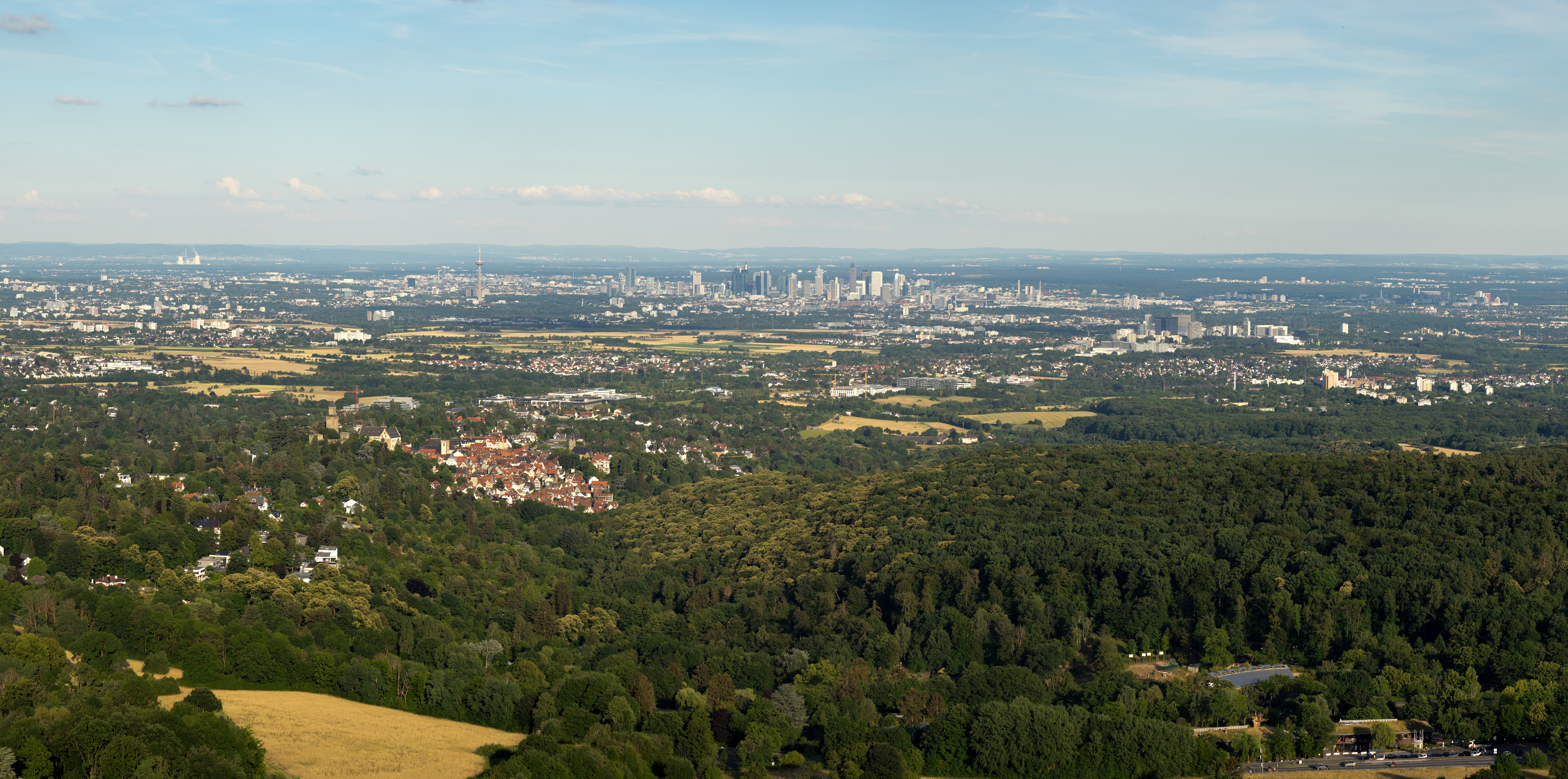
View from the Dettweiler Temple in the near Falkenstein Castle to Frankfurt and parts of its agglomeration. On the left in the foreground Kronberg Castle can be seen.

Frankfurt urban area within Hesse

To the west Frankfurt borders the administrative district (Landkreis) of Main-Taunus-Kreis with towns such as Hattersheim am Main, Kriftel, Hofheim am Taunus, Kelkheim, Liederbach am Taunus, Sulzbach, Schwalbach am Taunus and Eschborn; to the northwest the Hochtaunuskreis with Steinbach, Oberursel (Taunus) and Bad Homburg vor der Höhe; to the north the Wetteraukreis with Karben and Bad Vilbel; to the northeast the Main-Kinzig-Kreis with Niederdorfelden and Maintal; to the southeast the city of Offenbach am Main; to the south the Kreis Offenbach with Neu-Isenburg and to the southwest the Kreis Groß-Gerau with Mörfelden-Walldorf, Rüsselsheim and Kelsterbach.

Together with these towns (and some larger nearby towns, e.g., Hanau, Rodgau, Dreieich, Langen) Frankfurt forms a contiguous built-up urban area called Stadtregion Frankfurt which is not an official administrative district. The urban area had an estimated population of 2.3 million in 2010, and is the 13th-largest urban area in the EU.

=== Climate ===
Frankfurt has a temperate oceanic climate (Köppen: Cfb, Trewartha: Dobk). Its climate features cool winters with frequent rain showers and overcast skies, and warm summers. The average annual temperature is 11.4 °C (52.5 °F), with monthly mean temperatures ranging from 2.7 °C (36.9 °F) in January to 20.8 °C (69.4 °F) in July. The city is one of the warmest in Germany in winter.

The growing season is longer when compared to the rest of Germany, thus resulting in an early arrival of springtime in the region, with trees typically leafing out already toward the end of March.

Winters in Frankfurt are generally mild or at least not freezing with a small possibility of snow, especially in January and February but dark and often overcast. Frankfurt is, on average, covered with snow only for around 10 to 20 days per year. The temperature falls below 0 °C on about 64 days and the daily maximum stays below freezing for about 10 days on average per year.

Because of the mild climate in the region, there are some well-known wine regions in the vicinity such as Rhenish Hesse, Rheingau, Franconia (wine region) and Bergstraße (route). There is also a microclimate on the northern bank of the river Main which allows palms, fig trees, lemon trees and southern European plants to grow in that area. The area is called the "Nizza" (the German word for the southern French town Nice) and is one of the biggest parks with Mediterranean vegetation north of the Alps.

Climate data for Frankfurt Airport, 1991–2020 normals, extremes 1949–present
Month	Jan	Feb	Mar	Apr	May	Jun	Jul	Aug	Sep	Oct	Nov	Dec	Year
Record high °C (°F)	16.2 (61.2)	19.1 (66.4)	24.7 (76.5)	30.3 (86.5)	33.2 (91.8)	41.1 (106.0)	40.2 (104.4)	38.7 (101.7)	32.8 (91.0)	28.0 (82.4)	19.1 (66.4)	16.3 (61.3)	41.1 (106.0)
Mean maximum °C (°F)	12.1 (53.8)	13.8 (56.8)	19.0 (66.2)	24.8 (76.6)	28.9 (84.0)	32.5 (90.5)	34.1 (93.4)	33.5 (92.3)	27.8 (82.0)	22.0 (71.6)	16.6 (61.9)	12.5 (54.5)	35.6 (96.1)
Mean daily maximum °C (°F)	4.9 (40.8)	6.6 (43.9)	11.4 (52.5)	16.5 (61.7)	20.4 (68.7)	23.9 (75.0)	26.1 (79.0)	25.7 (78.3)	20.8 (69.4)	14.8 (58.6)	8.9 (48.0)	5.5 (41.9)	15.5 (59.8)
Daily mean °C (°F)	2.7 (36.9)	3.5 (38.3)	7.2 (45.0)	11.5 (52.7)	15.5 (59.9)	18.9 (66.0)	20.8 (69.4)	20.5 (68.9)	15.7 (60.3)	10.8 (51.4)	6.5 (43.7)	3.4 (38.1)	11.4 (52.6)
Mean daily minimum °C (°F)	0.5 (32.9)	0.4 (32.7)	2.2 (36.0)	5.4 (41.7)	9.3 (48.7)	12.8 (55.0)	14.8 (58.6)	14.4 (57.9)	10.6 (51.1)	6.7 (44.1)	3.2 (37.8)	0.4 (32.7)	7.0 (44.6)
Mean minimum °C (°F)	−9.1 (15.6)	−7.2 (19.0)	−4.2 (24.4)	−1.4 (29.5)	2.2 (36.0)	7.0 (44.6)	9.5 (49.1)	8.7 (47.7)	5.1 (41.2)	−0.1 (31.8)	−3.2 (26.2)	−7.7 (18.1)	−11.2 (11.8)
Record low °C (°F)	−21.6 (−6.9)	−19.6 (−3.3)	−13.0 (8.6)	−7.1 (19.2)	−2.8 (27.0)	0.1 (32.2)	2.8 (37.0)	2.5 (36.5)	−0.3 (31.5)	−6.3 (20.7)	−11.5 (11.3)	−17.0 (1.4)	−21.6 (−6.9)
Average precipitation mm (inches)	44.0 (1.73)	38.6 (1.52)	38.7 (1.52)	36.6 (1.44)	60.4 (2.38)	55.4 (2.18)	63.5 (2.50)	61.4 (2.42)	47.7 (1.88)	50.4 (1.98)	47.3 (1.86)	54.5 (2.15)	598.5 (23.56)
Average precipitation days (≥ 0.1 mm)	15.2	13.5	13.5	12.3	13.5	12.3	13.9	12.8	11.6	14.2	15	16.4	164.2
Average snowy days (≥ 1.0 cm)	4.9	3.3	1	0.1	0	0	0	0	0	0	0.6	3.3	13.2
Mean monthly sunshine hours	52	79	136	192	219	227	235	225	165	104	51	40	1,725
Source 1: Deutscher Wetterdienst
Source 2: NCEI (daily max and min, precipitation days and snow days), Infoclimat

Climate data for Frankfurt
Month	Jan	Feb	Mar	Apr	May	Jun	Jul	Aug	Sep	Oct	Nov	Dec	Year
Mean No. of days with Maximum temperature => 30.0 °C (86.0 °F)	0	0	0	0	0.5	3.3	6.5	5.4	0.7	0	0	0	16.4
Mean No. of days with Minimum temperature <= 0.0 °C (32.0 °F)	15.8	15	8.8	2.9	0.1	0	0	0	0	1.7	6.2	13.6	64.1
Mean No. of days with Maximum temperature <= 0.0 °C (32.0 °F)	4.6	2.2	0.1	0	0	0	0	0	0	0	0.4	3	10.3
Mean No. of days with snow depth => 1 cm (0.39 in)	4.9	3.3	1.1	0.1	0	0	0	0	0	0	0.6	3.3	13.3
Mean number of days with thunder	0.2	0.4	0.7	2.1	4.5	5.3	6.2	5.5	1.6	0.6	0.3	0.1	27.5
Mean number of days with hail	0	0	0	0.1	0.1	0.2	0.2	0.1	0	0	0	0	0.8
Mean number of days with fog	3	2.5	1.1	0.4	0.5	0.5	0.3	0.5	1.1	4.4	4.2	3.9	32.2
Number of days with no sunshine	19.9	15.4	14.1	9.9	11	8.8	9.3	7.7	11.1	15	19.2	21.7	163.1
Mean daily daylight hours	9.0	10.0	12.0	14.0	15.0	16.0	16.0	14.0	13.0	11.0	9.0	8.0	12.3
Average Ultraviolet index	1	1	3	4	6	7	7	6	5	3	1	1	3.5
Source 1: NOAA
Source 2: Weather Atlas

== Demographics ==
=== Population ===
Historical population
Year	Pop.	±%
1387	9,600	—
1520	10,000	+4.2%
1750	32,000	+220.0%
1871	91,040	+184.5%
1895	229,279	+151.8%
1905	334,978	+46.1%
1925	467,520	+39.6%
1933	555,857	+18.9%
1939	553,464	−0.4%
1945	357,737	−35.4%
1950	532,037	+48.7%
1961	685,682	+28.9%
1970	669,635	−2.3%
1980	629,375	−6.0%
1985	595,348	−5.4%
1990	644,865	+8.3%
1995	650,055	+0.8%
2001	641,076	−1.4%
2011	667,925	+4.2%
2022	743,268	+11.3%
Population size may be affected by changes in administrative divisions.

With a population of 763,380 (2019) within its administrative boundaries and of 2,300,000 in the actual urban area, Frankfurt is the fifth-largest city in Germany, after Berlin, Hamburg, Munich and Cologne. Central Frankfurt has been a Großstadt (a city with at least 100,000 residents by definition) since 1875. With 414,576 residents in 1910, it was the ninth largest city in Germany and the number of inhabitants grew to 553,464 before World War II. After the war, at the end of the year 1945, the number had dropped to 358,000. In the following years, the population grew again and reached an all-time-high of 691,257 in 1963. It dropped again to 592,411 in 1986 but has increased since then. According to the demographic forecasts for central Frankfurt, the city will have a population up to 813,000 within its administrative boundaries in 2035 and more than 2.5 million inhabitants in its urban area.

As of 2015, Frankfurt had 1909 ultra high-net-worth individuals, the sixth-highest number of any city in the world.

During the 1970s, the state government of Hesse wanted to expand the city's administrative boundaries to include the entire urban area. This would have made Frankfurt officially the second-largest city in Germany after Berlin with up to 3 million inhabitants. However, because local authorities did not agree, the administrative territory is still much smaller than its actual urban area.

=== Immigration and foreign nationals ===
According to data from the city register of residents, 51.2% of the population had a migration background as of 2015, which means that a person or at least one of their parents was born with foreign citizenship. For the first time, a majority of the city residents had an at least part non-German background. Moreover, three of four children in the city under the age of six had full or partial immigrant backgrounds, and 27.7% of residents had a foreign citizenship.

According to statistics, 46.7% of immigrants in Frankfurt come from other countries in the EU; 24.5% come from European countries that are not part of the EU; 15.7% come from Asia (including Western Asia and South Asia); 7.3% come from Africa; 3.4% come from North America (including the Caribbean and Central America); 0.2% come from Australia and New Zealand; 2.3% come from South America; and 1.1% come from Pacific island nations. Because of this the city is often considered to be a multicultural city, and has been compared to New York City and London.

Frankfurt has the largest Moroccan community in Germany, numbering about 8,000 people, and the Rhine-Main area has about 20,000. Many Moroccans came as guest workers in the 1970s.

Largest groups of foreign residents
Nationality	Population (30 June 2022)
Turkey	25,294
Croatia	16,751
Italy	15,120
Poland	12,174
Romania	10,451
Ukraine	9,748
Serbia	9,404
Bulgaria	8,509
India	7,612
Morocco	7,364
Spain	7,133
Greece	6,581
Bosnia and Herzegovina	6,342
Afghanistan	5,114
France	4,719
China	4,632
Algeria	4,087
Portugal	3,991
Japan	3,653
Eritrea	3,374

=== Religion ===
Frankfurt is historically a Protestant-dominated city. However, during the 19th century, an increasing number of Catholics moved to Frankfurt. As of 2013, the largest Christian denominations were Catholicism (22.7% of the population) and Protestantism, especially Lutheranism (19.4%).

The Jewish community has a history dating back to medieval times and has always ranked among the largest in Germany. More than 7,200 inhabitants are affiliated with the Jewish community, making it the third largest in Germany after Berlin and Munich. Frankfurt has four active synagogues.

Frankfurt has a Muslim community estimated at 12% in 2006. According to calculations based on census data for 21 countries of origin, the number of Muslim migrants in Frankfurt amounted to about 84,000 in 2011, making up 12.6% of the population. The most prevalent countries of origin were Turkey and Morocco. The Ahmadiyya Noor Mosque, constructed in 1959, is the city's largest mosque and the third largest in Germany. In 2020, the number of Muslims in Frankfurt's total population was estimated at 18%.

== Government and politics ==
=== Mayor ===
Results of the second round of the 2023 mayoral election

The current mayor is Mike Josef of the Social Democratic Party, who took the office on 11 May 2023.

The most recent mayoral election was held on 5 March 2023, with a runoff held on 26 March, and the results were as follows:

Candidate	Party	First round		Second round	
Candidate	Party	Votes	%	Votes	%
Uwe Becker	Christian Democratic Union	70,411	34.5	86,307	48.3
Mike Josef	Social Democratic Party	49,033	24.0	92,371	51.7
Manuela Rottmann	Alliance 90/The Greens	43,502	21.3		
Peter Wirth	Independent	10,397	5.1		
Daniela Mehler-Würzbach	The Left	7,356	3.6		
Maja Wolff	Independent	6,014	2.9		
Yanki Pürsün	Free Democratic Party	5,768	2.8		
Andreas Lobenstein	Alternative for Germany	4,628	2.3		
Mathias Pfeiffer	Citizens for Frankfurt	1,565	0.8		
Katharina Tanczos	Die PARTEI	1,176	0.6		
Khurrem Akhtar	Team Todenhöfer	858	0.4		
Frank Großenbach	dieBasis	744	0.4		
Tilo Schwichtenberg	Garden Party Frankfurt am Main	661	0.3		
Sven Junghans	Independent	574	0.3		
Yamòs Camara	Free Party Frankfurt	487	0.2		
Niklas Pauli	Independent	340	0.2		
Peter Pawelski	Independent	325	0.2		
Feng Xu	Independent	199	0.1		
Karl-Maria Schulte	Independent	158	0.1		
Markus Eulig	Independent	102	0.0		
Valid votes		204,298	99.6	178,678	99.0
Invalid votes		921	0.4	1,754	1.0
Total		205,219	100.0	180,432	100.0
Electorate/voter turnout		508,510	40.4	510,336	35.4
Source: City of Frankfurt am Main Archived 27 April 2021 at the Wayback Machine

=== City council ===
Results of the 2026 city council election

The Frankfurt am Main city council (Stadtverordnetenversammlung) governs the city alongside the mayor. It is located in the city's medieval town hall, Römer, which is also used for representative and official purposes. The most recent city council election was held on 15 March 2026, and the results were as follows:

Party	Lead candidate	Votes	%	+/-	Seats	+/-
Christian Democratic Union (CDU)	Nils Kößler	5,574,438	25.0	▲3.1	23	▲3
Alliance 90/The Greens (Grüne)	Katharina Knacker	4,641,480	20.8	▼3.8	19	▼4
Social Democratic Party (SPD)	Kolja Müller	3,692,240	16.6	▼0.4	15	▼1
The Left (Die Linke)	Michael Müller	2,049,227	9.2	▲1.3	9	▲2
Alternative for Germany (AfD)	Markus Fuchs	1,835,971	8.2	▲3.7	8	▲4
Volt Germany (Volt)	Eileen O'Sullivan	1,069,223	4.8	▲1.1	5	▲1
Free Democratic Party (FDP)	Stephanie Wüst	1,020,214	4.6	▼3.0	4	▼3
Citizens for Frankfurt (BFF)	Mathias Pfeiffer	316,752	1.4	▼0.6	1	▼1
Sahra Wagenknecht Alliance (BSW)	Eyup Yilmaz	272,316	1.2	New	1	New
Die PARTEI (PARTEI)	Claudia Wehnemann	223,280	1.0	▼0.8	1	▼1
Free Voters (FW)	Eric Pärisch	213,253	1.0	▲0.2	1	±0
I am a Frankfurter (IBF)	Jumas Medoff	212,413	1.0	▲0.2	1	±0
Animal Protection Party (Tierschutz)	Johannes Schmidt	211,729	0.9	New	1	New
The Frankfurters (DFRA)	Thomas Bäppler-Wolf	208,867	0.9	▲0.5	1	▲1
Europe List for Frankfurt (ELF)	Luigi Brillante	208,242	0.9	▼0.4	1	±0
Ecological Left – Anti-Racist List (ÖkoLinX-ARL)	Jutta Ditfurth	160,191	0.7	▼1.1	1	▼1
Alliance for Innovation and Justice (BIG)	Haluk Yıldız	148,727	0.7	▲0.1	1	±0
Frankfurt Social (FS)	Peter Feldmann	94,641	0.4	New	0	New
MERA25	Nikolaos-Konstantin Tsakmakis	81,798	0.4	New	0	New
Garden Party Frankfurt am Main (Gartenpartei)	Tilo Schwichtenberg	49,530	0.2	▼0.4	0	▼1
Pirate Party Germany (Piraten)	Andreas Gran	13,282	0.1	▼0.5	0	▼1
Global Unity in Germany (GUG)	Prahlada Nagendrappa	2,334	0.0	New	0	New
Valid votes		246,224	96.8			
Invalid votes		8,153	3.2			
Total		254,377	100.0		93	±0
Electorate/voter turnout		513,170	49.6	▲4.5		
Source: Vote Manager

=== Landtag election ===
For elections to the Hesse State Parliament, Frankfurt am Main is split up into six constituencies. In total 15 delegates represent the city in the Landtag in Wiesbaden. The last election took place in October 2018. Six members of parliament were directly elected in their respective constituencies: Uwe Serke (CDU, Frankfurt am Main I), Miriam Dahlke (Greens, Frankfurt am Main II), Ralf-Norbert Bartel (CDU, Frankfurt am Main III), Michael Boddenberg (CDU, Frankfurt am Main IV), Markus Bocklet (Greens, Frankfurt am Main V) and Boris Rhein (CDU, Frankfurt am Main VI).

Delegates from Frankfurt often serve high-ranking positions in Hessian politics, e.g. Michael Boddenberg is Hessian Minister of Finance and Boris Rhein was elected President of the Landtag of Hesse in 2019.

=== German federal election ===
For federal elections which are held every four years, Frankfurt is split up into two constituencies. In the German federal election 2017, Matthias Zimmer (CDU) and Bettina Wiesmann were elected to the Bundestag by directe mandate in Frankfurt am Main I and Frankfurt am Main II respectively. Nicola Beer (FDP), Achim Kessler (Linke), Ulli Nissen (SPD) and Omid Nouripour (Greens) were elected as well.

Nicola Beer resigned as a member of parliament in 2019 following her election to the European Parliament where she now serves as vice president.

== Economy ==
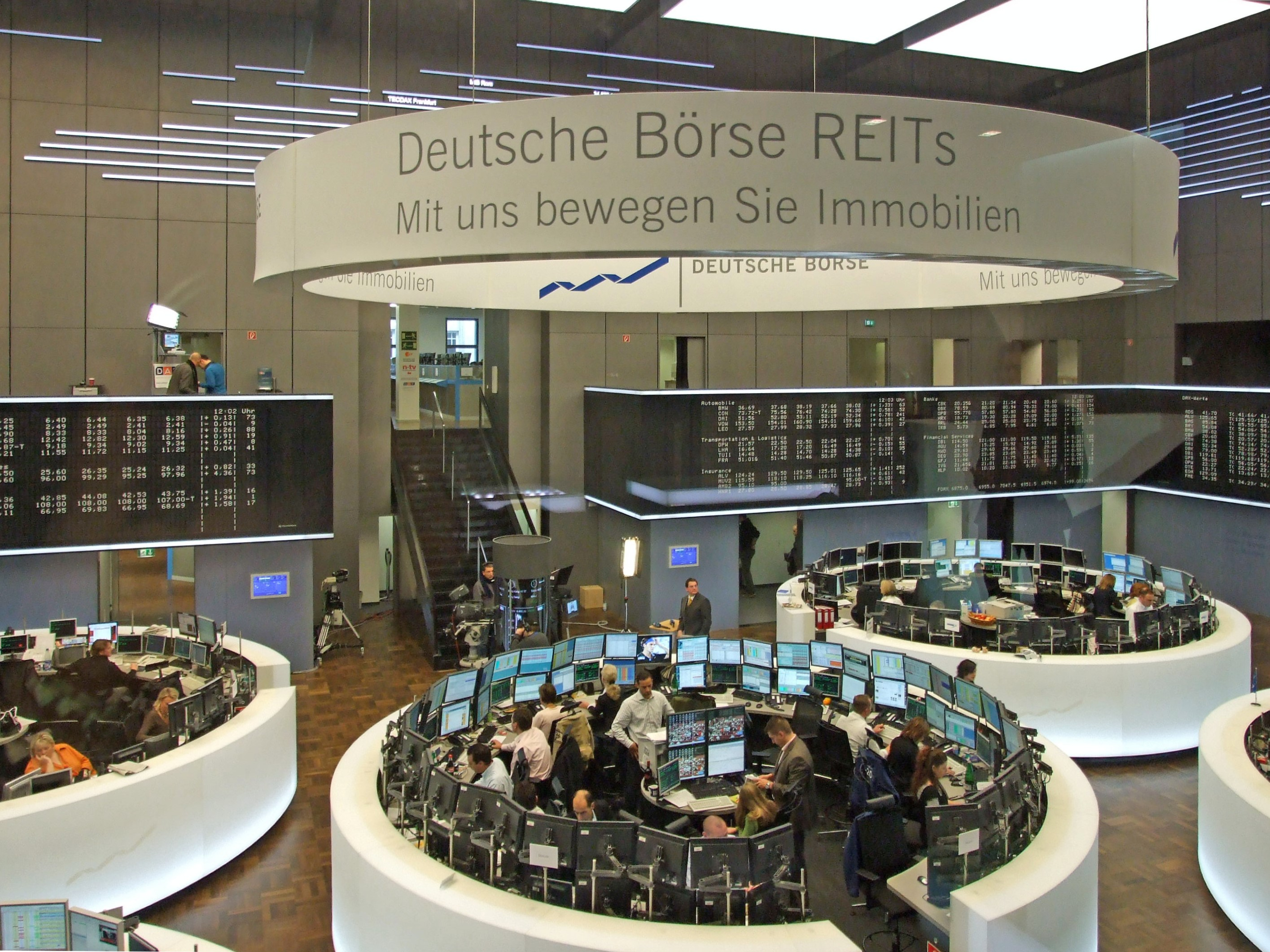
Deutsche Börse trading floor in Frankfurt

Frankfurt is one of the world's most important financial hubs and Germany's financial capital, followed by Hamburg and Stuttgart. Frankfurt was ranked eighth at the International Financial Centers Development Index (2013), eighth at the Worldwide Centres of Commerce Index (2008), ninth at the Global Financial Centres Index (September 2013), tenth at the Global Power City Index (2011), 11th at the Global City Competitiveness Index (2012), 12th at the Innovation Cities Index (2011), 14th at the World City Survey (2011) and 23rd at the Global Cities Index (2012).

The city's importance as a financial hub has risen since the eurozone crisis. Indications are the establishment of two institutions of the European System of Financial Supervisors (European Insurance and Occupational Pensions Authority and European Systemic Risk Board) in 2011, and the entry into force in 2014 of European Banking Supervision, by which the European Central Bank has become the central supervisory authority for the euro area banking sector.

According to an annual study by Cushman & Wakefield, the European Cities Monitor (2010), Frankfurt has been one of the top three cities for international companies in Europe, after London and Paris, since the survey started in 1990. It is the only German city considered to be an alpha world city (category 3) as listed by the Loughborough University group's 2010 inventory, which was a promotion from the group's 2008 inventory when it was ranked as an alpha minus world city (category 4).

With more than 922 jobs per 1,000 inhabitants, Frankfurt has the highest concentration of jobs in Germany. On work days and Saturdays, one million people commute from all over the Rhein-Main-Area. The GRP per capita was €96,670 in 2019.

The city is expected to benefit from international banks relocating jobs from London to Frankfurt as a result of Brexit to retain access to the EU market. Thus far, Morgan Stanley, Citigroup Inc., Standard Chartered Plc and Nomura Holdings Inc. announced they would move their EU headquarters to Frankfurt.

=== Central banks ===
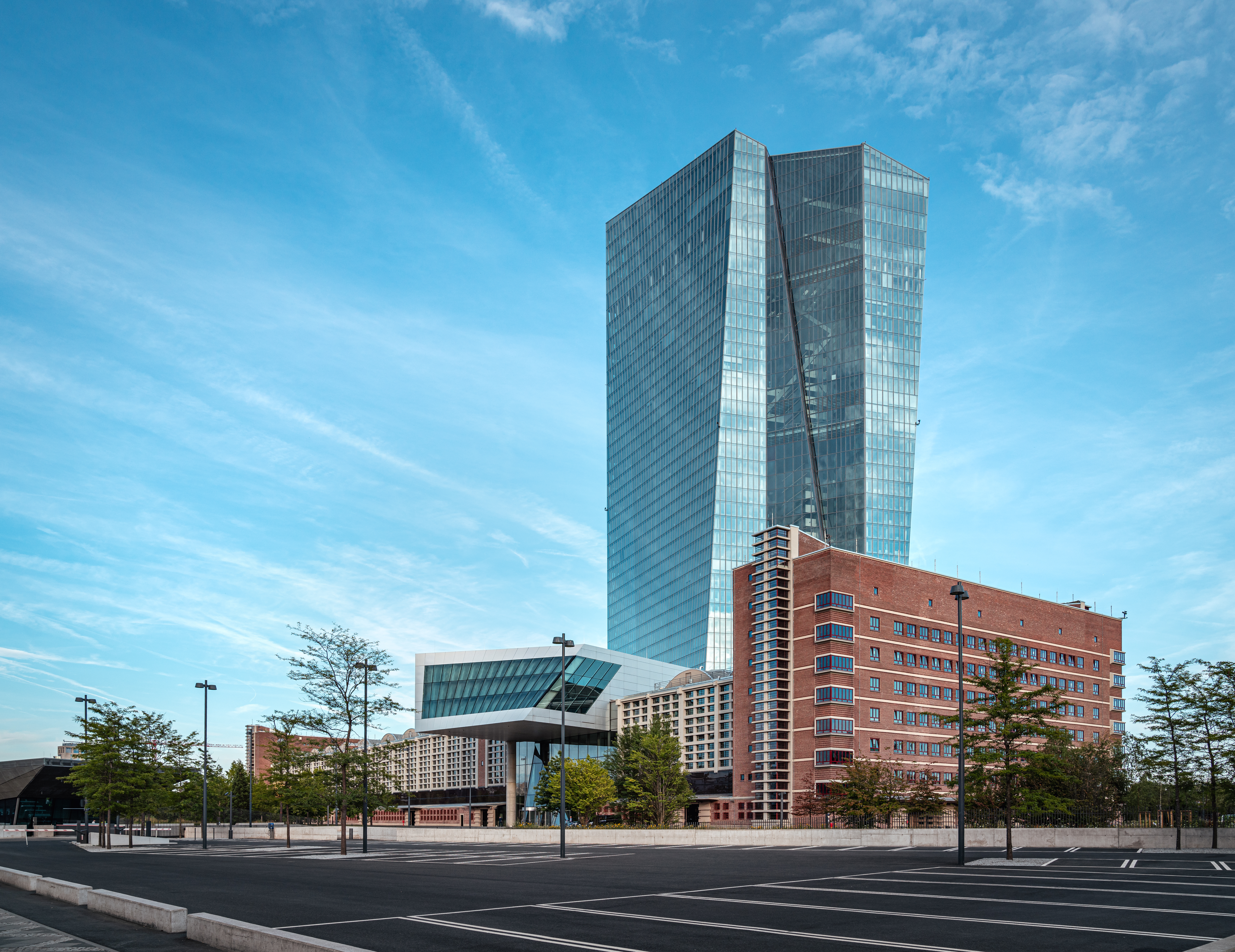
The new headquarters of the European Central Bank in the Ostend district

Frankfurt is home to two important central banks: the German Bundesbank and the European Central Bank (ECB).

==== European Central Bank ====
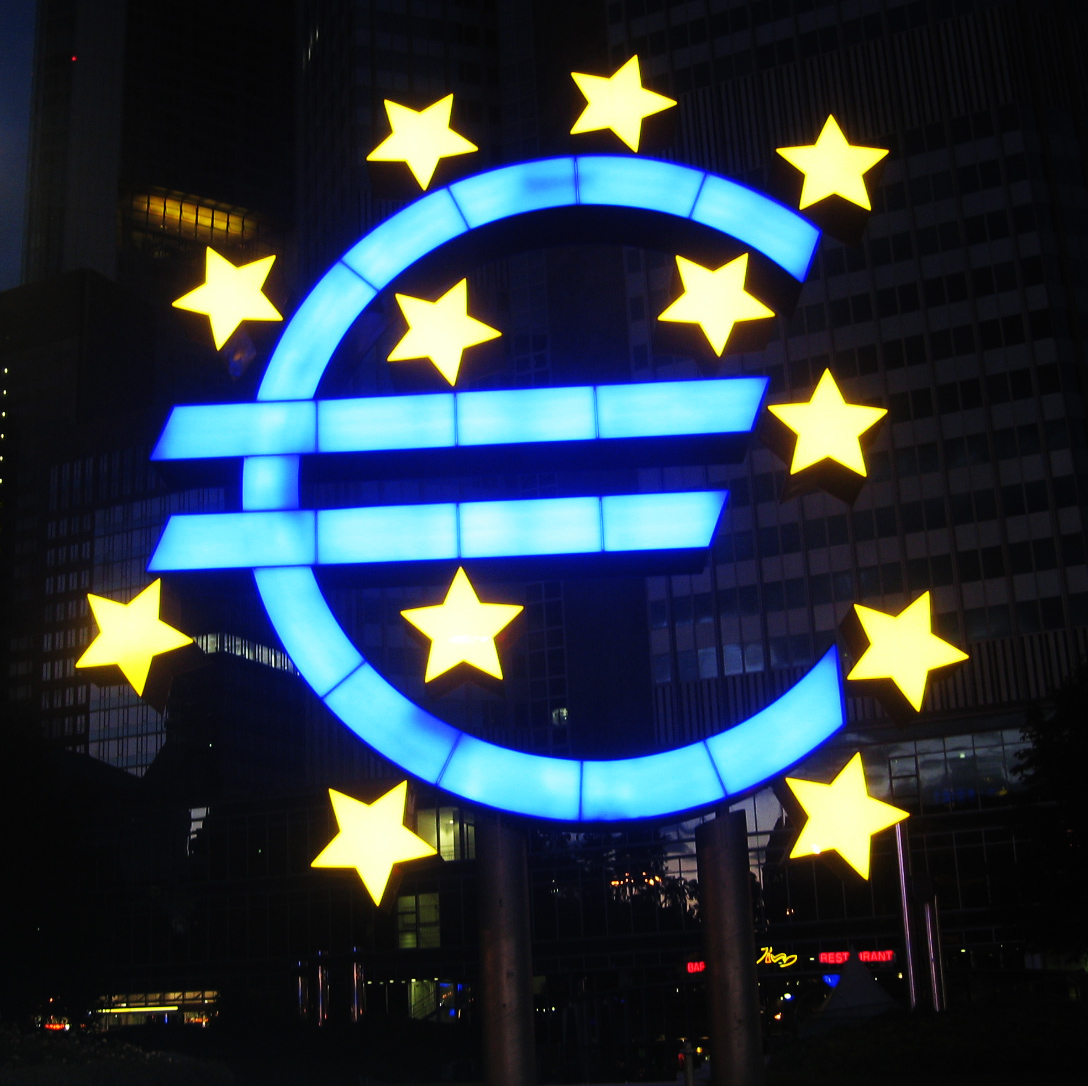
Euro-Skulptur

The European Central Bank (Europäische Zentralbank) is one of the world's most important central banks with a balance sheet total of around 7 trillion. The ECB sets monetary policy for the Eurozone, consisting of 19 EU member states that have adopted the Euro (€) as their common currency. From 1998 the ECB Headquarters have been located in Frankfurt, first in the Eurotower at Willy-Brandt-Platz and in two other nearby high-rises. The new Seat of the European Central Bank in the Ostend district, consisting of the former wholesale market hall (Großmarkthalle) and a newly built 185-meter skyscraper, was completed in late 2014. The new building complex was designed to accommodate up to 2,300 ECB personnel. The location is a few kilometers away from downtown and borders an industrial area as well as the Osthafen (East Harbor), It was primarily chosen because of its large premises which allows the ECB to install security arrangements without high fences.

The city honors the importance of the ECB by officially using the slogan "The City of the Euro" since 1998.

==== Deutsche Bundesbank ====
The Deutsche Bundesbank (German Federal Bank), located in Ginnheim, was established in 1957 as the central bank for the Federal Republic of Germany. Until the euro (€) was introduced in 1999, the Deutsche Bundesbank was responsible for the monetary policy of Germany and for the German currency, the Deutsche Mark (DM). The Bundesbank was greatly respected for its control of inflation through the second half of the 20th century. Today the Bundesbank is an integral part of the European System of Central Banks (ESCB) which is formed by all 27 EU member states. Its balance sheet total is around 2,7 trillion, making it the 4th biggest central bank.

=== Commercial banks ===
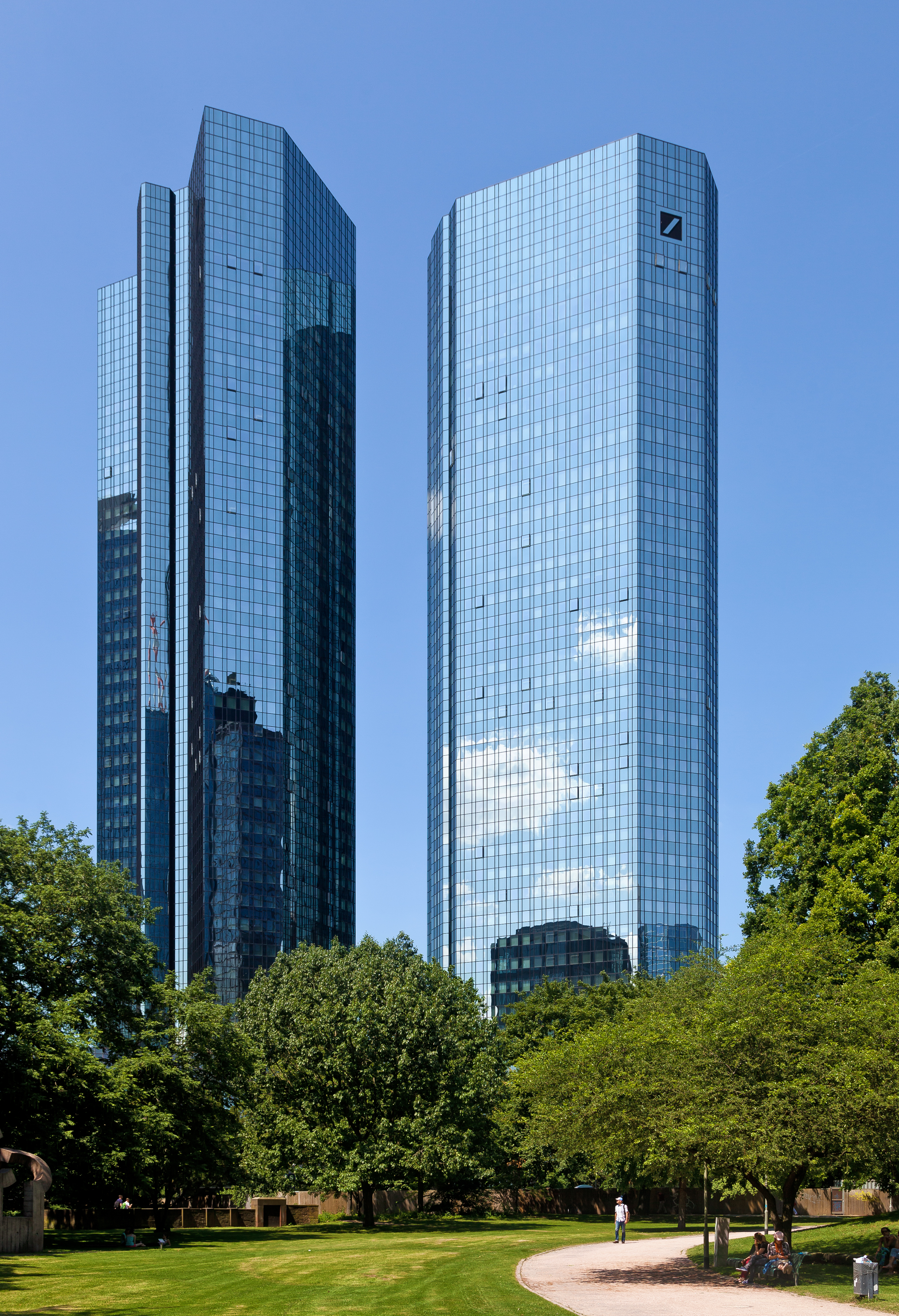
Deutsche Bank Twin Towers

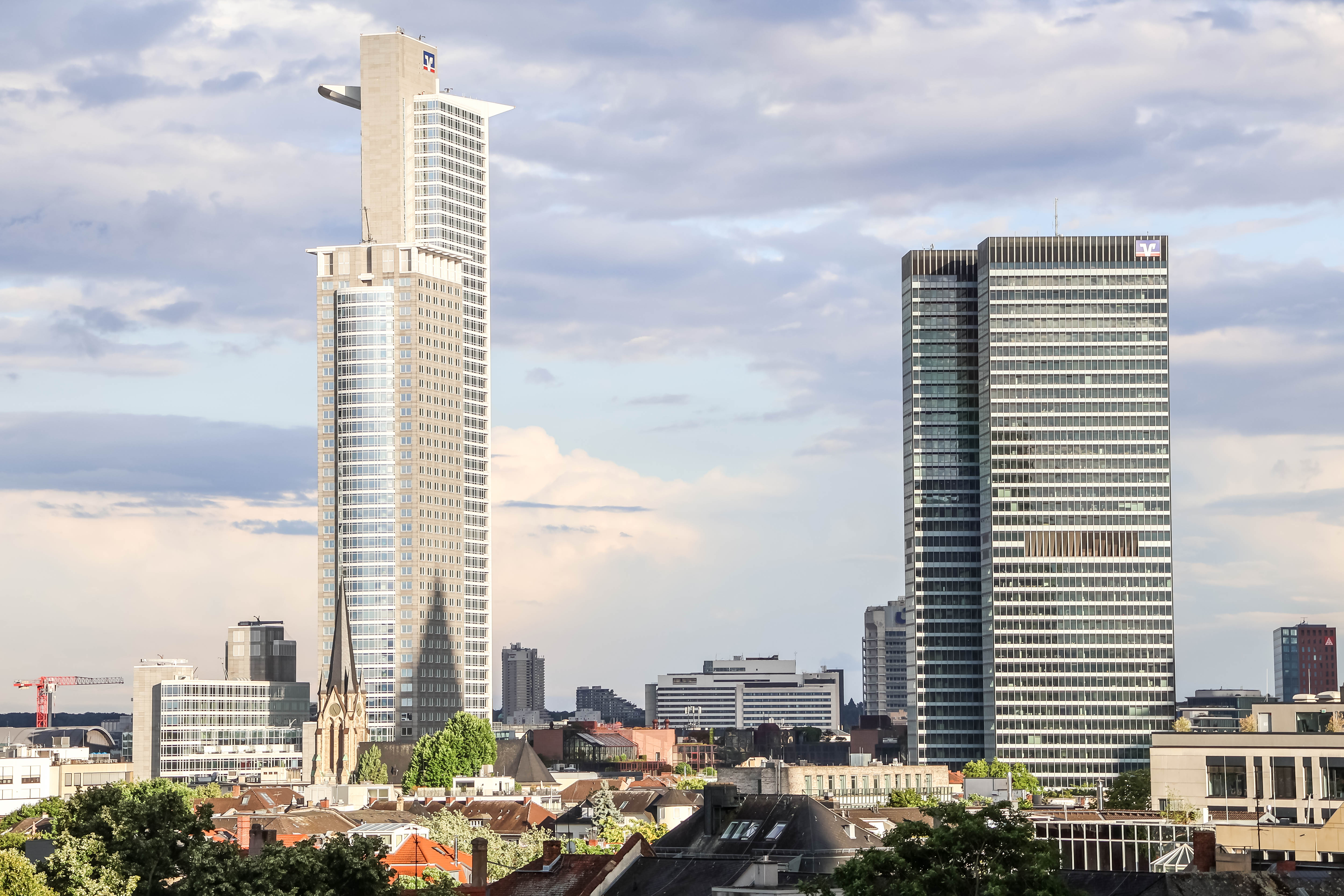
Westend Tower, also known as Westendstraße 1 or Crown Tower, headquarters of DZ Bank

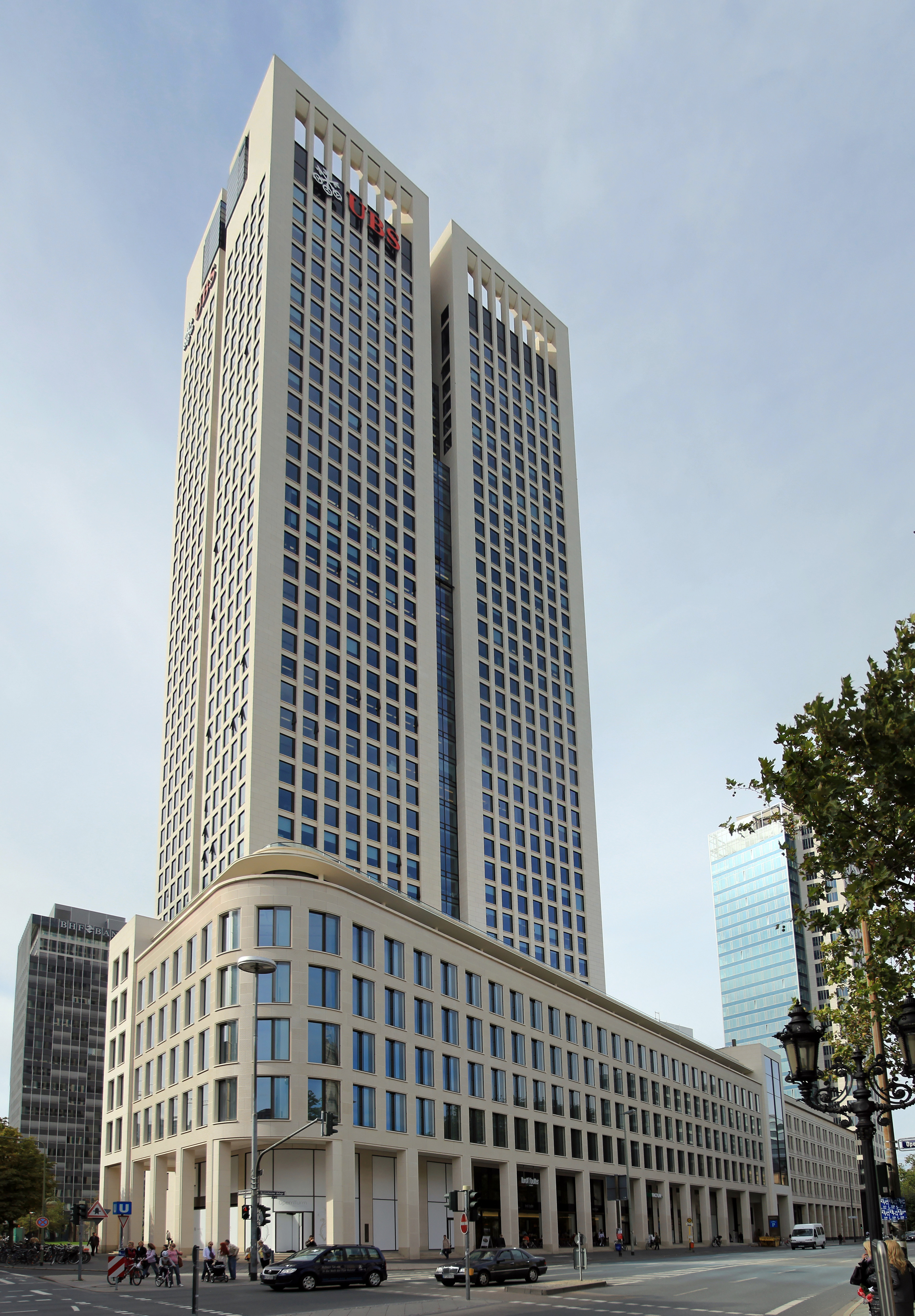
Opernturm, headquarters of UBS Germany, at the Opernplatz

In 2010, there were 63 national and 152 international banks that had a registered office in Frankfurt, including the headquarters of the major German banks, as well as 41 offices of international banks. Frankfurt is therefore known as Bankenstadt ("City of the banks") and nicknamed "Mainhattan" (a portmanteau of the local Main river and Manhattan in New York City) or "Bankfurt". 73,200 people were employed at banks in 2010.

- Deutsche Bank — Germany's largest commercial bank. It had 15% share of private customers and total assets of €1,900 billion in 2010. Deutsche Bank ranks among the 30 largest banks in the world and the ten largest banks in Europe. Deutsche Bank is listed on the DAX, the stock market index of the 30 largest German business companies at the Frankfurt Stock Exchange. In November 2010 Deutsche Bank bought the majority of shares of competitor Postbank. Its headquarters are located at Taunusanlage in the financial district.
- DZ Bank — Central institution for more than 900 co-operative banks (Volksbanken und Raiffeisenbanken) and their 12,000 branch offices in Germany and is a corporate and investment bank. It is Germany's second-largest bank (total assets: €509 billion). The DZ Bank Group defines itself primarily as a service provider for the local Volksbanken and Raiffeisenbanken and their 30 million clients. The DZ Bank headquarters are the Westend Tower and the City-Haus at Platz der Republik. The DZ Bank Group includes Union Investment, DVB Bank and Reisebank, which are also headquartered in Frankfurt.
- KfW Bankengruppe — Government-owned development bank formed in 1948 as part of the Marshall Plan. KfW provides loans for approved purposes at lower rates than commercial banks, especially to medium-sized businesses. With total assets of €507 billion (2017), it is Germany's third-largest bank. The KfW headquarters are located in the Westend district at Bockenheimer Landstraße and Senckenberganlage.
- Commerzbank — Germany's fourth-largest bank by total assets (2017). In 2009, Commerzbank merged with competitor Dresdner Bank, then the third-largest German bank. Due to the merger and the higher credit risks, Commerzbank was 25% nationalized during the Great Recession. It is listed in the DAX. Its headquarters are at Commerzbank Tower (259 meters), the second-tallest building in the EU, at Kaiserplatz.
- Landesbank Hessen-Thüringen – Landesbank Hessen-Thüringen, or short Helaba, is a commercial bank owned by the states of Hesse and Thuringia (Landesbank). As such, it is a service provider for the local Sparkassen. Helaba is one of nine Landesbanken and is the fifth-largest in Germany. It is located in the 200-metre-tall (660 ft) Main Tower in the financial district, the only skyscraper in Frankfurt with an observation desk open to the public.
- DekaBank – DekaBank is the central asset manager of the Sparkassen in Germany. The headquarters of DekaBank are located at the Trianon skyscraper at Mainzer Landstraße.
- ING Diba Germany – Germany's largest direct bank, headquartered in Bockenheim

Other major German banks include Frankfurter Volksbank, the second-largest Volksbank in Germany, Frankfurter Sparkasse and old-established private banks such as Bankhaus Metzler, Hauck & Aufhäuser and Delbrück Bethmann Maffei.

Many international banks have a registered or a representative office, e.g., Credit Suisse, UBS, Bank of America, Morgan Stanley, Goldman Sachs, Merrill Lynch, JPMorgan Chase & Co., Bank of China, Banco do Brasil, Itaú Unibanco Société Générale, BNP Paribas, SEB, Royal Bank of Scotland and Barclays.

=== Frankfurt Stock Exchange ===
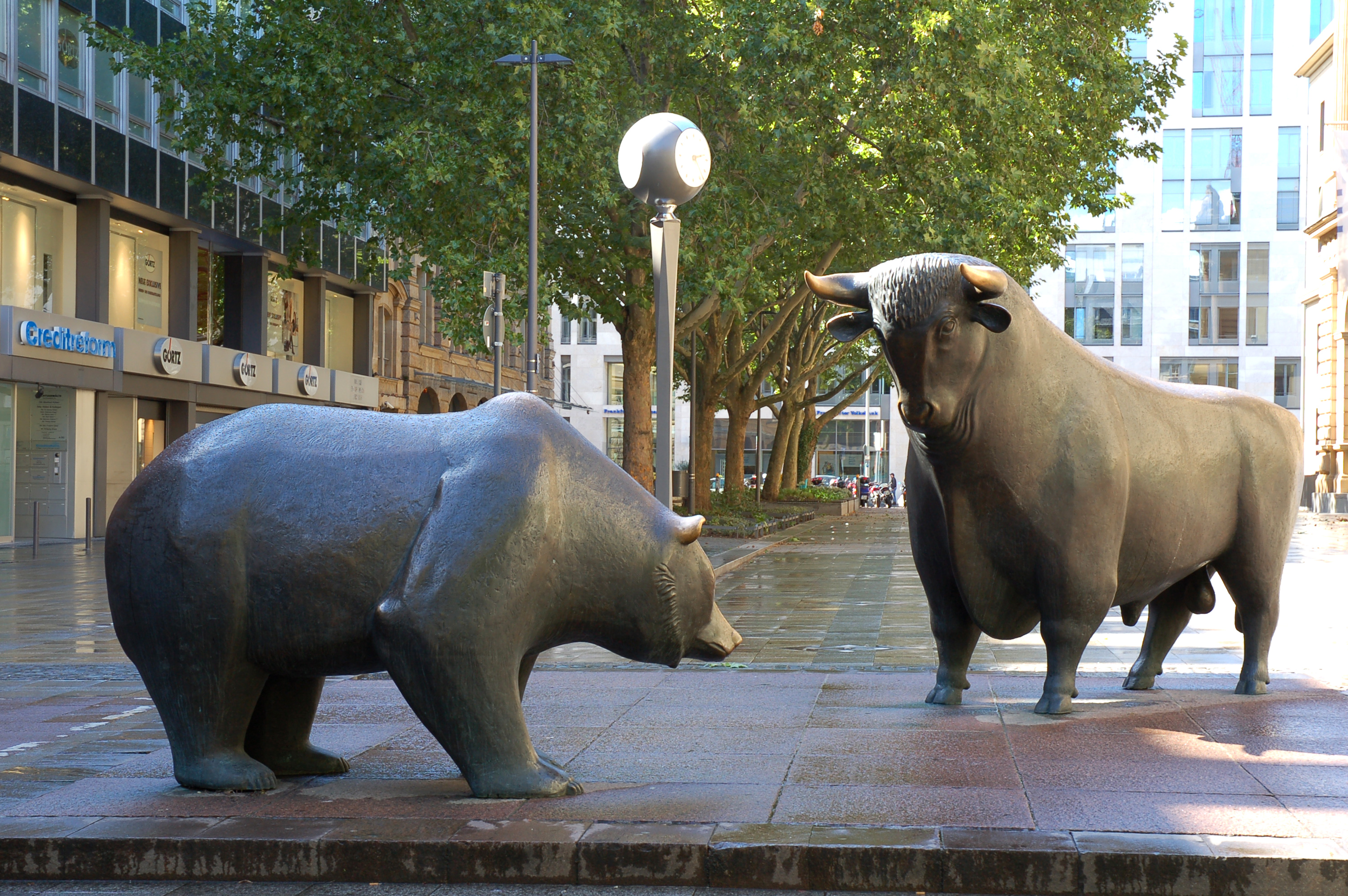
Bull and bear in front of the Frankfurt Stock Exchange

The Frankfurt Stock Exchange (Frankfurter Wertpapierbörse) began in the ninth century. By the 16th century Frankfurt had developed into an important European hub for trade fairs and financial services. Today the Frankfurt Stock Exchange is by far the largest in Germany, with a turnover of more than 90 percent of the German stock market and is the third-largest in Europe after the London and the Paris. The most important stock market index is the DAX, the index of the 30 largest German business companies listed at the stock exchange. The stock exchange is owned and operated by Deutsche Börse, which is itself listed in the DAX. Deutsche Börse also owns the European futures exchange Eurex and clearing company Clearstream. On 1 February 2012 European Commission blocked the proposed merger of Deutsche Börse and NYSE Euronext. "The merger between Deutsche Börse and NYSE Euronext would have led to a near-monopoly in European financial derivatives worldwide. These markets are at the heart of the financial system and it is crucial for the whole European economy that they remain competitive. We tried to find a solution, but the remedies offered fell far short of resolving the concerns." European competition commissioner Joaquín Almunia said.

It is located downtown at the Börsenplatz. Deutsche Börse's headquarters are formally registered in Frankfurt, but it moved most of its employees to a high-rise called "The Cube" in Eschborn in 2010, primarily due to significantly lower local corporate taxes.

=== Frankfurt Trade Fair ===
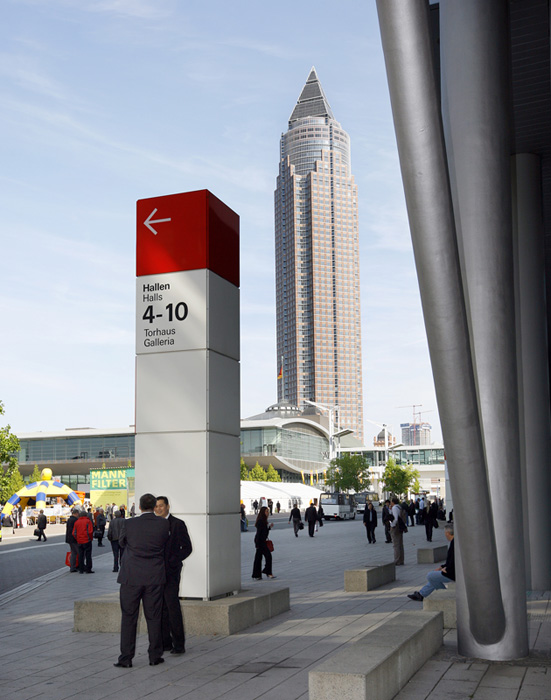
Messeturm seen from the trade fair premises

Frankfurt Trade Fair (Messe Frankfurt) has the third-largest exhibition site in the world with a total of 578,000 m^{2} (6,220,000 sq ft). The trade fair premises are located in the western part between Bockenheim, the Westend and the Gallus district. It houses ten exhibition halls with a total of 321,754 m^{2} (3,463,330 sq ft) of space and 96,078 m^{2} (1,034,170 sq ft) of outdoor space.

Frankfurt and the river Rhine tributary Main acquired transnational economic importance in the Middle Ages. In 1337 the Holy Roman Emperor Louis IV of Bavaria issued a diploma privilege so that any other city was not allowed to establish a market or trade fair if this could harm the Frankfurt Trade Fair in any way. This imperial backing allowed Frankfurt to retain the commanding importance of the Frankfurt Trade Fair for centuries. In the Middle Ages the full range of manufactured and semi-processed commodities were trade at Frankfurt Fairs.

Hosted in Frankfurt are the Frankfurt Book Fair (Frankfurter Buchmesse), the world's largest book fair, the Ambiente Frankfurt, the world's largest consumer goods fair, the Achema, the world's largest plant engineering fair, and many more like Paperworld, Christmasworld, Beautyworld, Tendence Lifestyle or Light+Building. Messe Frankfurt GmbH, the owner and operator company, organized 87 exhibitions in 2010, of which 51 were in foreign countries. It is one of the largest trade fair companies with commercial activities in more than 150 countries.

=== Aviation ===
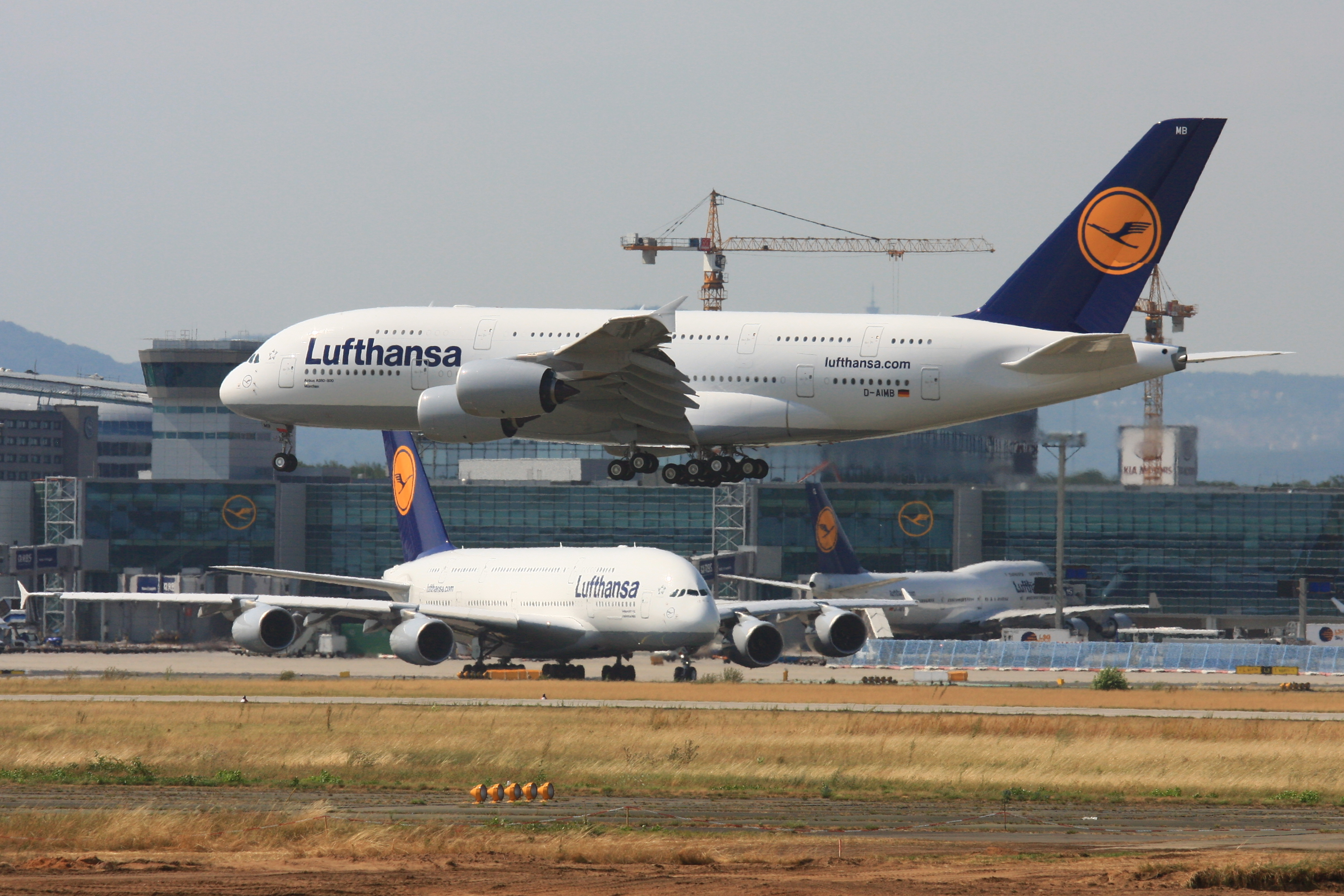
Two Lufthansa Airbus A380s at Frankfurt Airport

Frankfurt Airport is one of the busiest airports in the world and is also the single largest place of work in Germany with more than 500 companies, which employ 71,500 people (2010).

Fraport is the owner and operator of Frankfurt Airport. It is the airport's second-largest employer (19,800 workers in 2010). Fraport also operates other airports worldwide, e.g., King Abdulaziz International Airport in Jeddah, Jorge Chávez International Airport in Lima and Antalya Airport.

The largest company at Frankfurt Airport is Lufthansa, Germany's flag carrier and Europe's largest airline. Lufthansa employs 35,000 people in Frankfurt. The Lufthansa Aviation Center (LAC) is the main operation base of Lufthansa at Frankfurt Airport. The airport serves as Lufthansa's primary hub with 157 worldwide destinations (compared to 110 destinations at Munich Airport, Lufthansa's second-largest hub). Lufthansa Cargo is based in Frankfurt and operates its largest cargo center (LCC) at Frankfurt Airport. Lufthansa Flight Training is also based here.

Condor is a German airline based at Frankfurt Airport.

=== Media ===
==== Newspapers ====
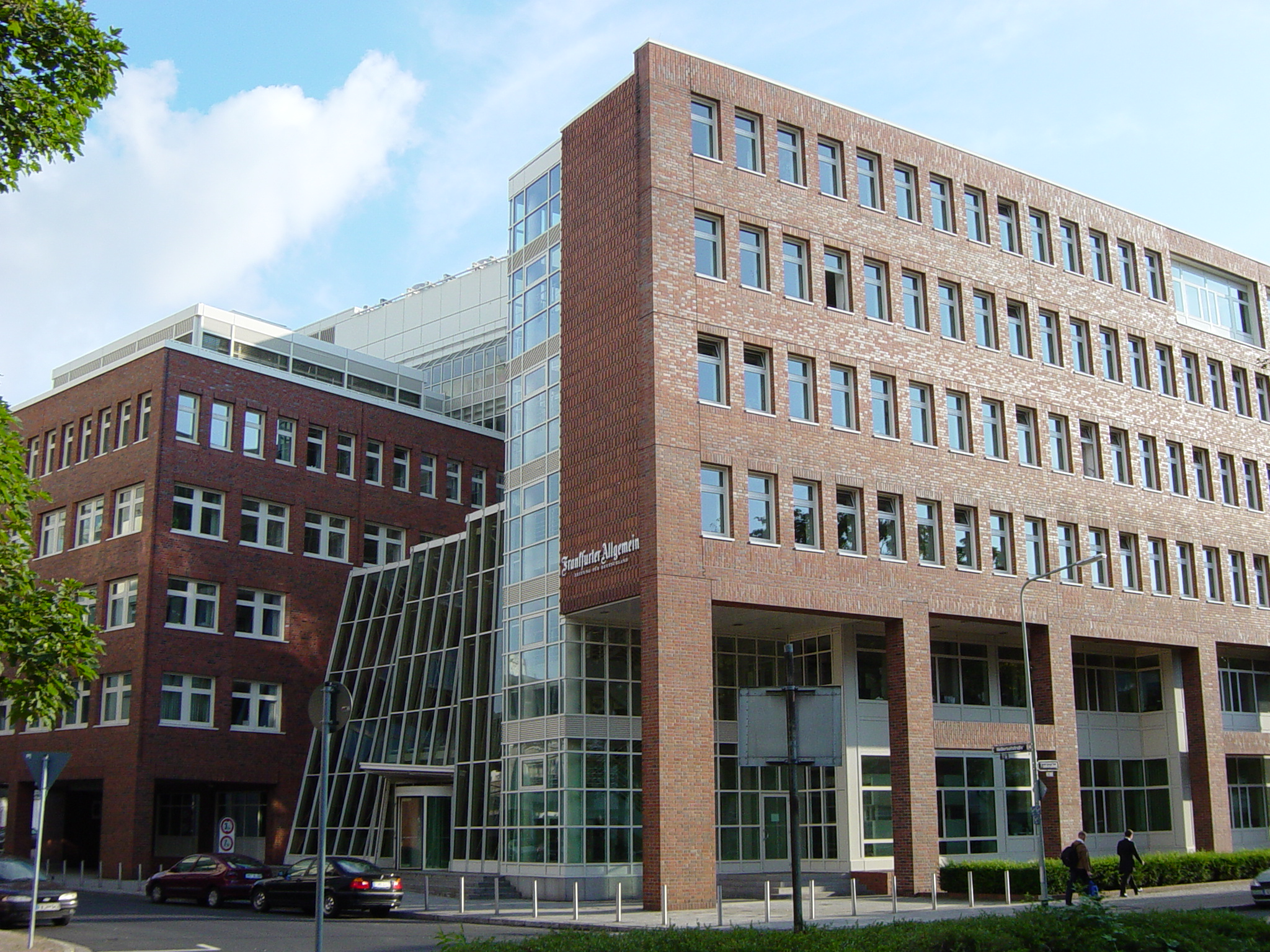
Editorial department building of Frankfurter Allgemeine Zeitung

Two important daily newspapers are published. The conservative Frankfurter Allgemeine Zeitung, also known as FAZ, was founded in 1949 and is the German newspaper with the widest circulation outside of Germany, with its editors claiming to deliver the newspaper to 148 countries every day. The FAZ has a circulation of more than 380,000 copies daily. The other important newspaper, the Frankfurter Rundschau, was first published in 1945 and has a daily circulation of more than 181,000.

==== Magazines ====
Several magazines also originate from Frankfurt. The local Journal Frankfurt is the best-known magazine for events, parties, and "insider tips". Öko-Test is a consumer-oriented magazine that focuses on ecological topics. Titanic is a well-known and often criticized satirical magazine with a circulation of approximately 100,000.

==== Radio and TV ====
Frankfurt's first radio station was the Südwestdeutsche Rundfunkdienst AG (Southwest German Broadcast Service), founded in 1924. Its successor service is the public broadcaster Hessischer Rundfunk (Hessian Broadcast Service). It is located at the "Funkhaus am Dornbusch" in the Dornbusch district and is one of the most important radio and television broadcasters in Hesse, with additional studios in Kassel, Darmstadt and Fulda.

Bloomberg TV and RTL Television have regional studios.

Other radio broadcasters include Main FM and Radio X.

From August 1945 to October 2004, the American Forces Network (AFN) had broadcast from Frankfurt (AFN Frankfurt). Due to troop reductions the AFN's location has been closed with AFN now broadcasting from Mannheim.

==== News agency ====
Frankfurt is home to the German office of Reuters, a global news agency. Associated Press and US-based international news agency Feature Story News have bureaux in Frankfurt.

=== Other industries ===
==== Accountancy and professional services ====
Three of the four largest international accountancy and professional services firms (Big Four) are present.

PricewaterhouseCoopers (PwC) German headquarters are located at Tower 185. KPMG moved its European Headquarters (KPMG Europe LLP) to The Squaire. Deloitte Touche Tohmatsu are present, while Ernst & Young is located in Eschborn.

==== Credit rating agencies ====
The three major international credit rating agencies – Standard & Poor's, Moody's and Fitch Ratings – have their German headquarters in Frankfurt.

==== Investment trust companies ====
DWS Investments is one of the largest investment trust company in Germany and manages €859 billion fund assets. It is one of the ten largest investment trust companies in the world. Other large investment trust companies are Universal Investment, Allianz Global Investors Europe (a division of Allianz SE, and a top-five global active investment manager), Union Investment and Deka Investmentfonds.

==== Management consultancies ====
Many of the largest international management consultancies are represented, including Arthur D. Little, McKinsey & Company, Boston Consulting Group, Booz & Company, Oliver Wyman, Bearing Point, Capgemini, Bain & Company and Roland Berger Strategy Consultants.

==== Real estate services companies ====
Located in Frankfurt are the German headquarters of Jones Lang LaSalle and BNP Paribas Real Estate.

==== Law firms ====
Frankfurt has the highest concentration of lawyers in Germany, with one lawyer per 97 inhabitants (followed by Düsseldorf with a ratio of 1/117 and Munich with 1/124) in 2005.

Most of the large international law firms maintain offices, among them A&O Shearman, Baker McKenzie, Bird & Bird, Clifford Chance, Cleary Gottlieb Steen & Hamilton, Debevoise & Plimpton, DLA Piper, Freshfields Bruckhaus Deringer, Hogan Lovells, Jones Day, K&L Gates, Latham & Watkins, Linklaters, Mayer Brown, Milbank, Tweed, Hadley & McCloy, Norton Rose, Sidley Austin, SJ Berwin, Skadden, Arps, Slate, Meagher & Flom, Sullivan & Cromwell, Taylor Wessing and White & Case.

==== Advertising agencies ====
According to a ranking of German FOCUS magazine (November 2007) seven of the 48 largest advertising agencies in Germany are based in Frankfurt, including Havas, Dentsu, McCann-Erickson, Saatchi & Saatchi, JWT, and Publicis. Frankfurt is a media business cluster. Around 570 companies of the advertising industry and 270 public relations companies are located in Frankfurt.

==== Food ====
Frankfurt is home to the German headquarters of Nestlé, the world's largest food company, located in Niederrad. Other important food companies are Ferrero SpA (German headquarters) and Radeberger Gruppe KG, the largest private brewery group in Germany.

==== Automotive ====
The South-Korean automobile manufacturer Kia Motors moved its European headquarters to Frankfurt in 2007. In the same year, Italian manufacturer Fiat opened its new German headquarters. The automotive supplier Continental AG has the headquarters and a major manufacturing plant of its Chassis & Safety division (formerly ITT Automotive) located in Frankfurt Rödelheim.

==== Construction ====
Some of the largest German construction companies have offices, e.g., Bilfinger Berger, Hochtief, Züblin and BAM Deutschland.

==== Property and real estate ====
Frankfurt has Germany's highest concentration of homeowners. This is partly attributed to the financial sector, but also to its cosmopolitan nature, with expatriates and immigrants representing one-fourth of its population. For this reason, Frankfurt's property market often operates differently than the rest of the country where the prices are generally flatter.

==== Tourism ====
Frankfurt is one of Germany's leading tourist destinations. In addition to its infrastructure and economy, its diversity supports a vibrant cultural scene. This blend of attractions led 4.3 million tourists (2012) to visit Frankfurt. The Hotels in central Frankfurt offer 34,000 beds in 228 hotels, of which 13 are luxury hotels and 46 are first-class hotels.

==== Other ====
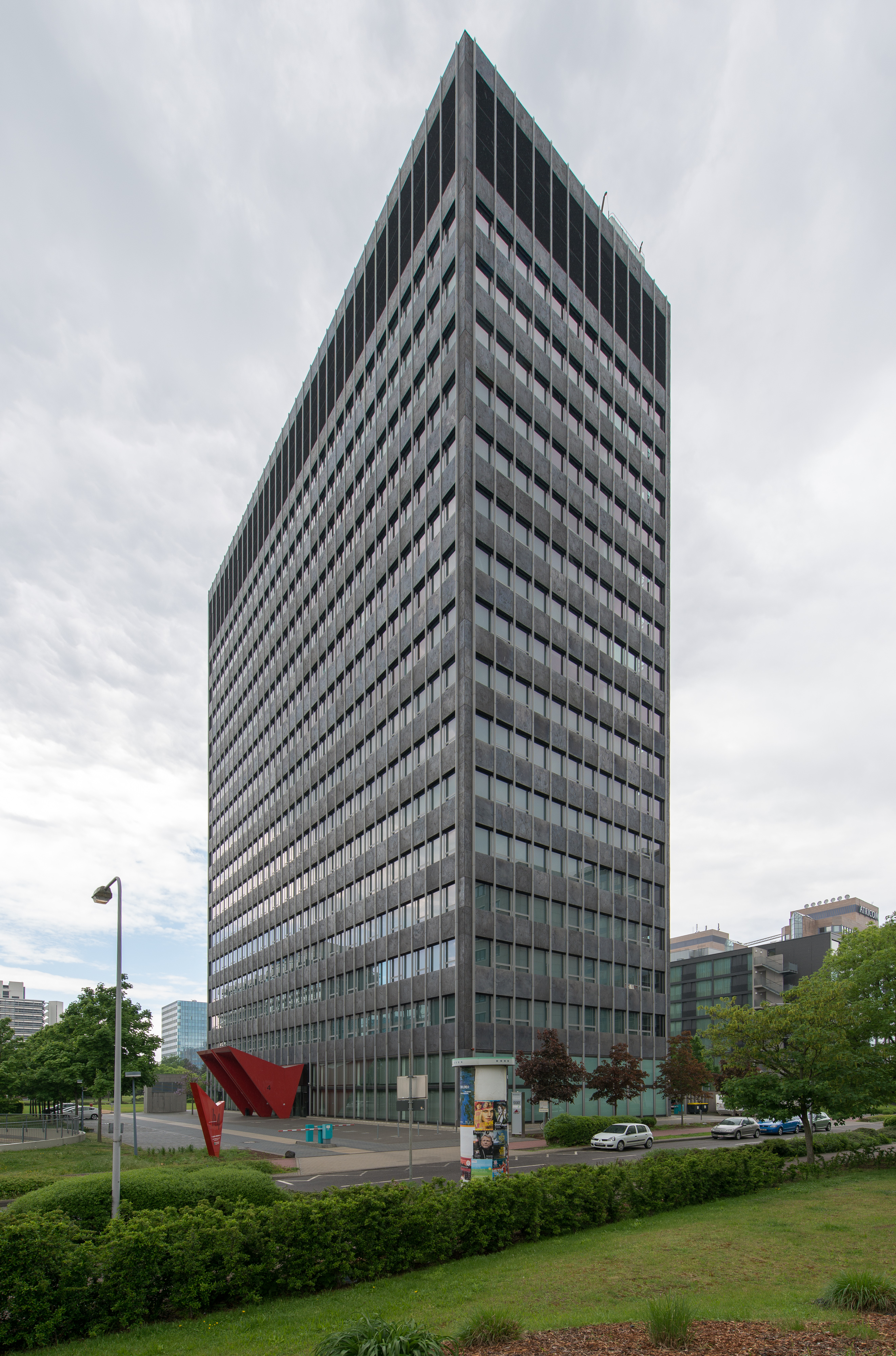
Headquarters of Colt Technology Services and Nintendo of Europe in the Lyoner Quartier

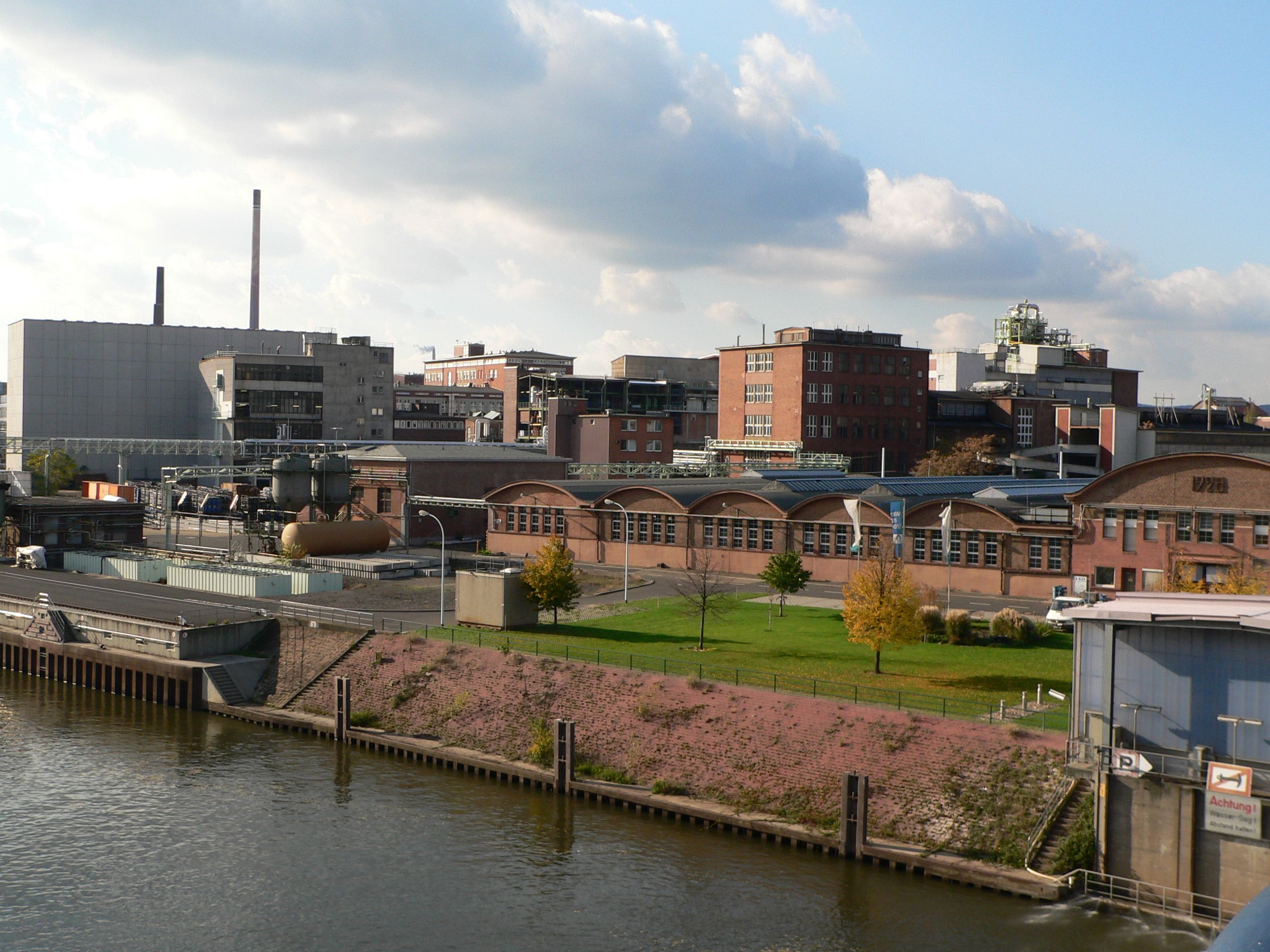
Industriepark Höchst

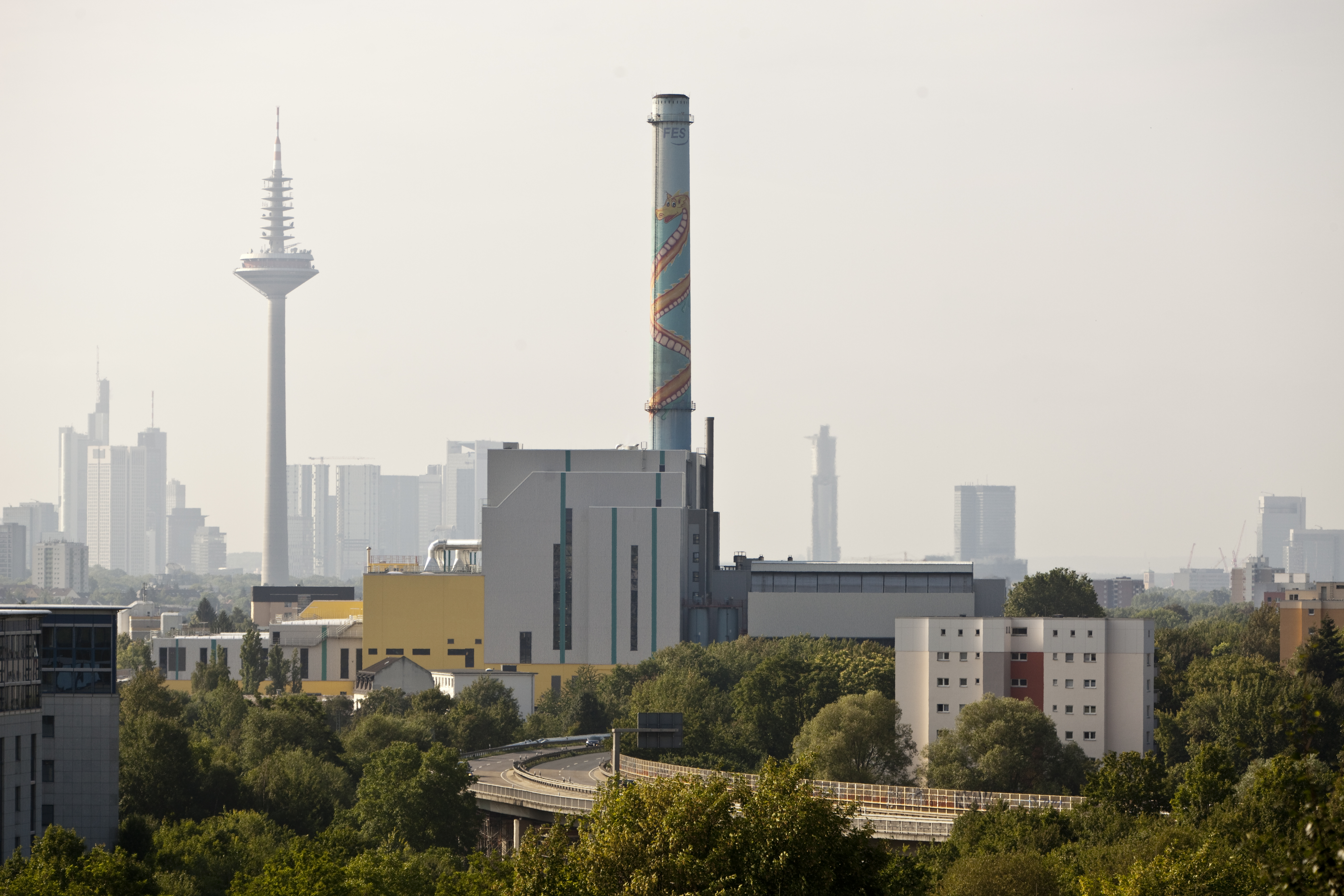
Mainova heating plant

Frankfurt is home to companies from the chemical, transportation, telecommunication and energy industries. Some of the larger companies are:

- Industriepark Höchst — An industrial park in Höchst. It is one of Germany's largest with more than 90 companies from the pharmaceutical, the chemical and the biotechnology industry, including Celanese, Clariant, BASF, Merck KGaA and Siemens. It was founded by chemical company Hoechst AG in 1874. At the beginning of the 1980s Hoechst AG was the largest pharmaceutical corporation and Industriepark Höchst was known as "the pharmacy of the world". Hoechst AG merged with Rhône-Poulenc to become Aventis in 1999 and in 2004 Aventis merged with Sanofi-Synthélabo to become Sanofi-Aventis. In 2005, around 22,000 people worked at Industriepark Höchst. In 2011, Ticona now part of Celanese, an international manufacturer of engineering polymers, moved to Industriepark Höchst.
- Deutsche Bahn – Deutsche Bahn subsidiaries DB Fernverkehr, DB Regio, DB Stadtverkehr, DB Netz, DB Schenker and the corporate development department of Deutsche Bahn are Frankfurt-based.
- Deutsche Telekom – Deutsche Telekom's subsidiary T-Systems is Frankfurt-based.
- COLT – telecommunications company with Frankfurt-based German headquarters
- Nintendo — In 2014, Nintendo of Europe moved its headquarters from Großostheim to Frankfurt.
- CenturyLink — internet service provider with German headquarters in Frankfurt
- DE-CIX – Frankfurt is an important location for electronic communication, especially the Internet. It is home to DE-CIX, the world's largest internet exchange point.
- Mainova – The largest regional energy supplier in Germany with about one million customers in Hesse. It provides electricity, gas, heat and water. Its headquarters are Frankfurt-based.

In addition, several cloud and fintech startups have their headquarters in Frankfurt.

=== Shopping ===
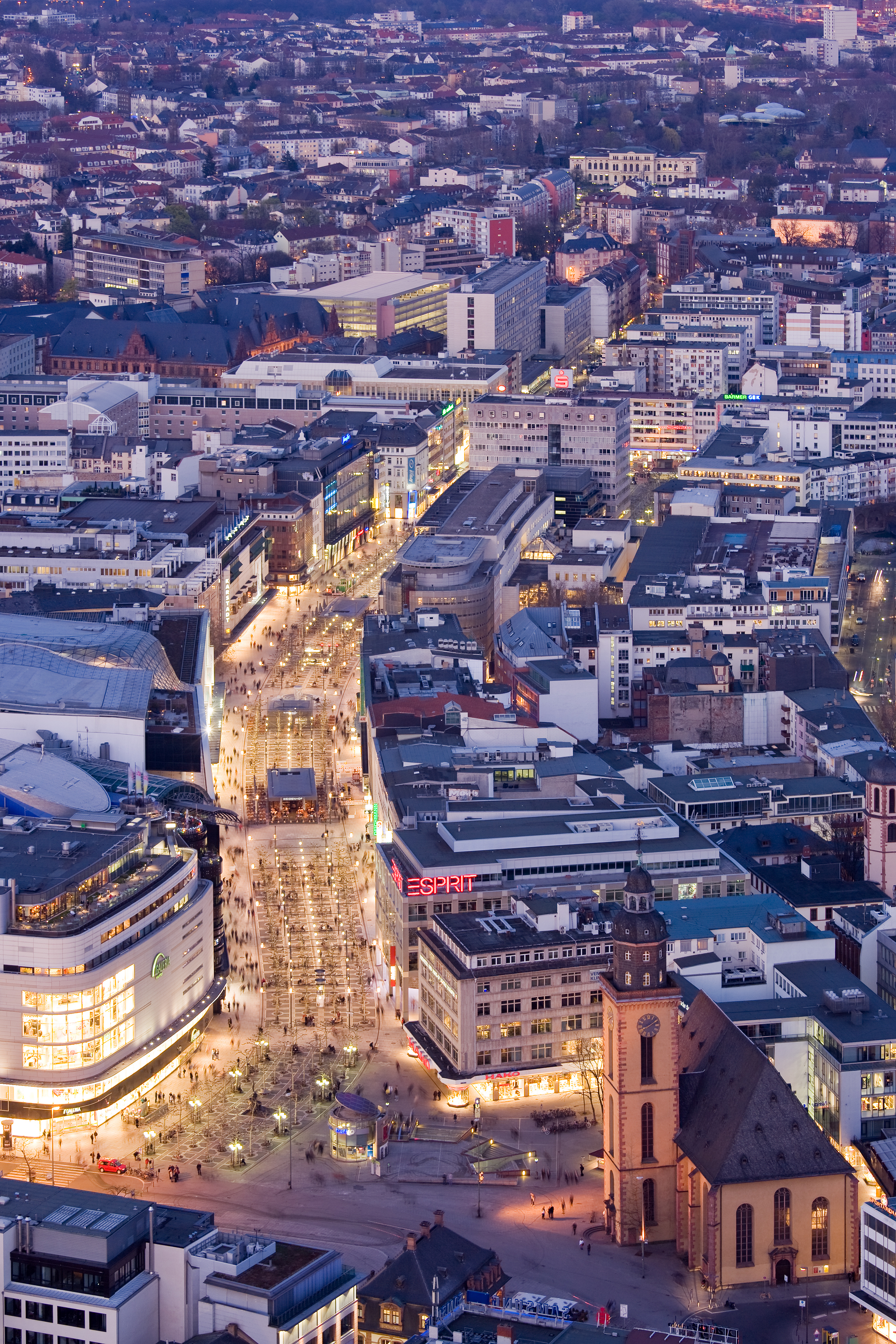
Zeil, Frankfurt's central shopping street

- Zeil – Frankfurt's central shopping street is a mile long and has been a shopping destination for more than a century. Only the western half of Zeil is pedestrianized. MyZeil is a stereotypical shopping mall. Three more shopping malls occupy the Zeil: UpperZeil (replacing the Zeilgalerie, which was demolished in 2016), Galeria Kaufhof and Karstadt, as well as large fashion retail clothing stores from Peek & Cloppenburg and C&A. During the month before Christmas, the extended pedestrian-only zone is host to Frankfurt Christmas Market, one of the largest and oldest Christmas markets in Germany. Zeil is bordered by two large public squares, Hauptwache in the west and Konstablerwache in the east. It is the second most expensive street for shops to rent in Germany after the Kaufingerstraße in Munich. 85 percent of the shops are retail chains such as H&M, Saturn, Esprit, Zara or NewYorker.
- Goethestraße – Frankfurt's shopping destination for prestigious luxury shops like Louis Vuitton, Prada, Gucci, Tiffany, Giorgio Armani, Versace, Cartier, Burberry, Vertu and Bulgari.
- Freßgass – (officially Kalbächer Gasse and Große Bockenheimer Straße) is a central pedestrian-only street section between Börsenstraße and Opernplatz. The name translates as "feeding alley" because of its high concentration of gastronomy, but lately prestigious shops (e.g., Apple Store, Hugo Boss, Porsche Design) have moved here due to the lack of space in the neighboring Goethestraße, displacing old, established restaurants, butchers and delicatessens.
- Berger Straße – Frankfurt's longest shopping street. It starts in the city center, runs through Nordend and Bornheim and ends in Seckbach. The street is less crowded than the Zeil and offers a greater variety of smaller shops, restaurants and cafés.
- Leipziger Straße – Central shopping street in the Bockenheim district starting at Bockenheimer Warte going towards West. High density of shops for daily needs.
- Braubachstraße – In the Altstadt district, close to the historic sites of the city, offers a large variety of art galleries, second-hand bookshops and antique shops.
- Münchener Straße – In the Bahnhofsviertel district, located between the central station and Willy-Brandt-Platz, is the most multicultural shopping street with many shops selling imported products mainly from Turkey, the Middle East and Asia.
- Kleinmarkthalle – (literally: Small Market Hall) is a market hall close to Konstablerwache square offering fresh food and flowers. In addition to regional delicacies like green sauce imported goods are offered. The Kleinmarkthalle is the largest public marketplace in Frankfurt.
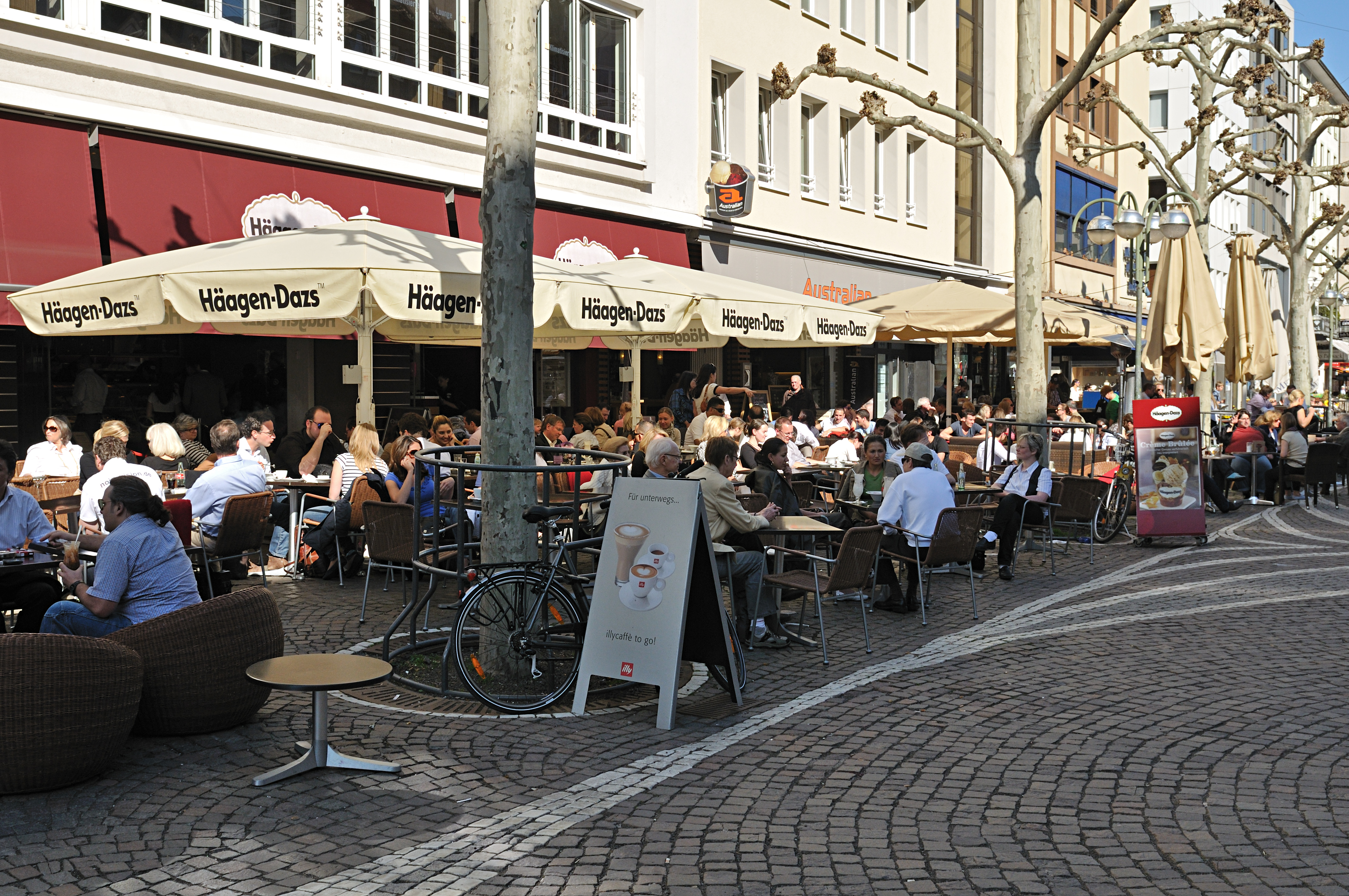
Sidewalk cafés at Fressgass

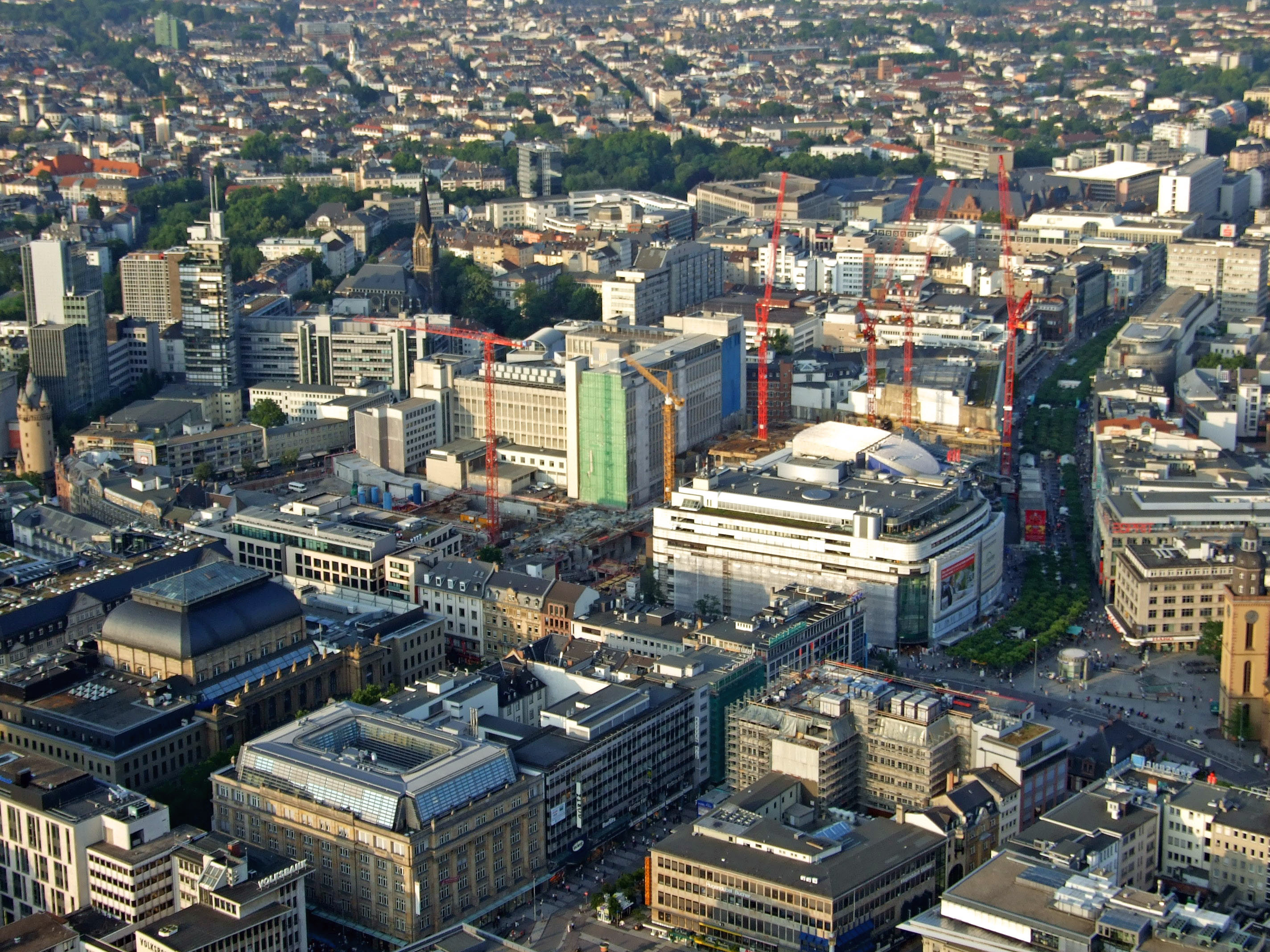
Eschenheimer Tor und Zeil

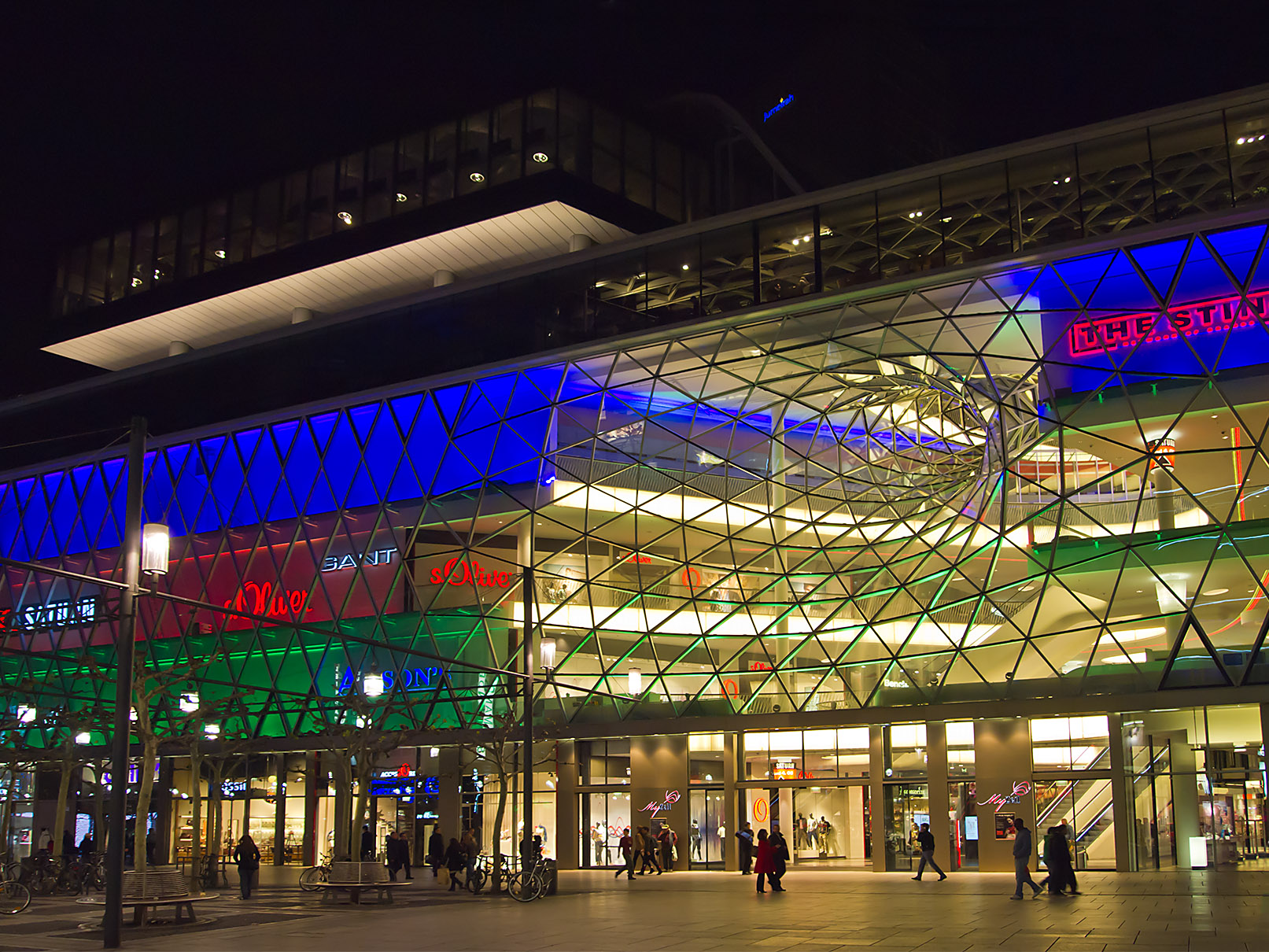
Shopping mall MyZeil

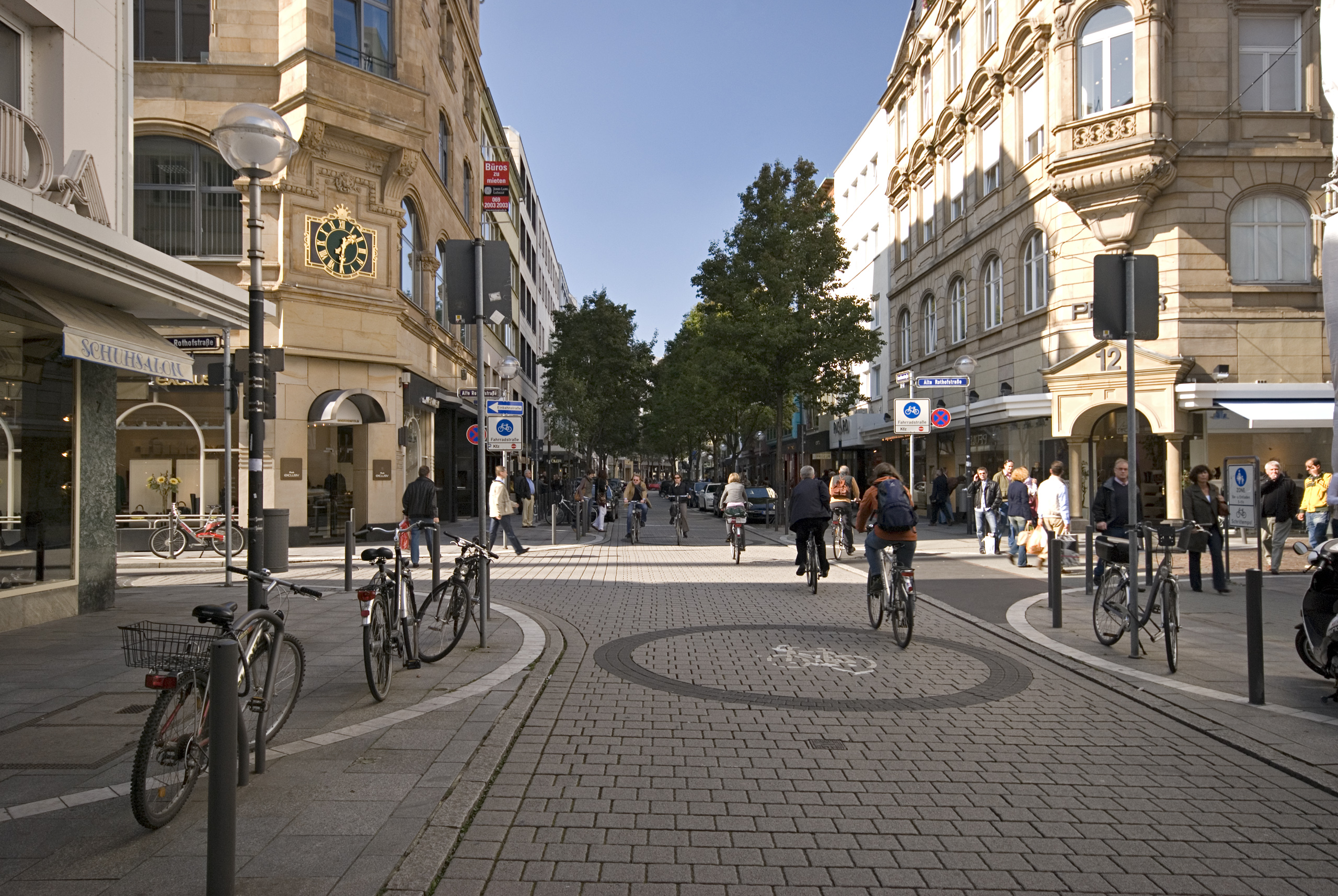
Luxury shopping at Goethestraße

=== Urban area (suburban) businesses ===
Within Frankfurt's urban area are several important companies.

The business hub of Eschborn is located right at Frankfurt's city limits in the west and attracts businesses with significantly lower corporate taxes compared to Frankfurt. Major companies in Eschborn include Ernst & Young, Vodafone Germany, Randstad NV and VR Leasing. Deutsche Börse moved most of its employees to Eschborn in 2010.

Rüsselsheim is internationally known for its automobile manufacturer Opel, one of the biggest automobile manufacturers in Germany. With 20,000 employees in 2003, Opel was one of the five largest employers in Hesse.

Offenbach am Main is home to the European headquarters of automobile manufacturer Hyundai Motor Company, to the German headquarters of automobile manufacturer Honda, to Honeywell Germany and to Deutscher Wetterdienst, the central scientific agency that monitors weather and meteorological conditions over Germany.

Two DAX companies are located in Bad Homburg vor der Höhe, Fresenius SE & Co. KGaA and Fresenius Medical Care. Other major companies are Hewlett-Packard, Bridgestone, Deutsche Leasing and Basler Versicherungen.

Kronberg im Taunus is home of the German headquarters of automobile manufacturer Jaguar Cars as well as the German headquarters of Accenture.

Lufthansa Systems, a subsidiary of Lufthansa, is located in Kelsterbach.

LSG Sky Chefs, another subsidiary of Lufthansa, is located in Neu-Isenburg.

The German headquarters of Thomas Cook Group are based in Oberursel.

Langen is home to Deutsche Flugsicherung, the German air traffic control.

== Landmarks ==
=== Römer ===
Römer, the city hall

Römer, the German word for Roman, is a complex of nine houses that form the Frankfurt city hall (Rathaus). The houses were acquired by the city council in 1405 from a wealthy merchant family. The middle house became the city hall and was later connected with its neighbors. The Kaisersaal ("Emperor's Hall") is located on the upper floor and is where the newly crowned emperors held their banquets. The Römer was partially destroyed in World War II and later rebuilt. The surrounding square, the Römerberg, is named after the city hall.

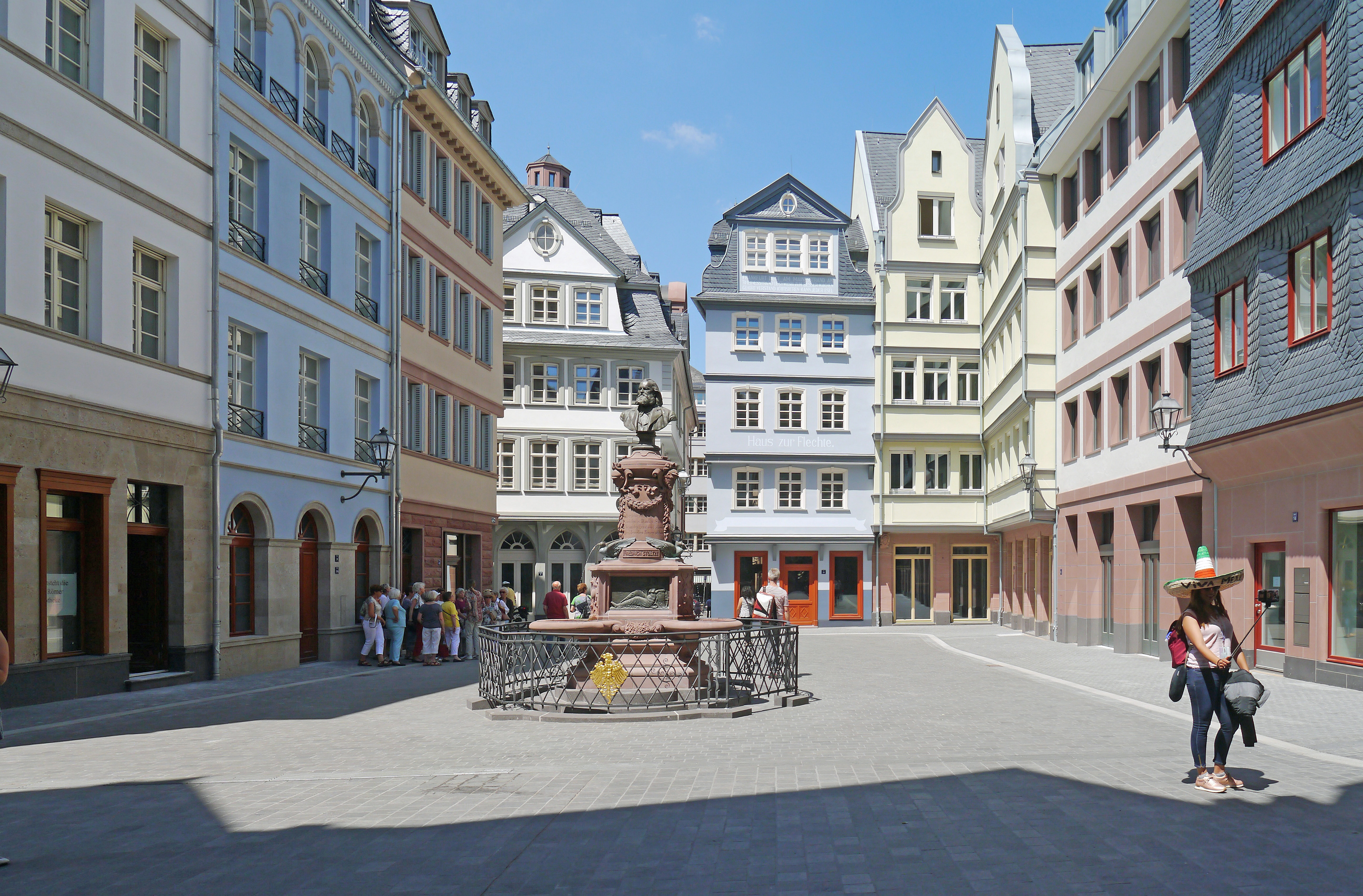
The New Frankfurt Old Town was completed in 2018, including 15 reconstructed historical buildings

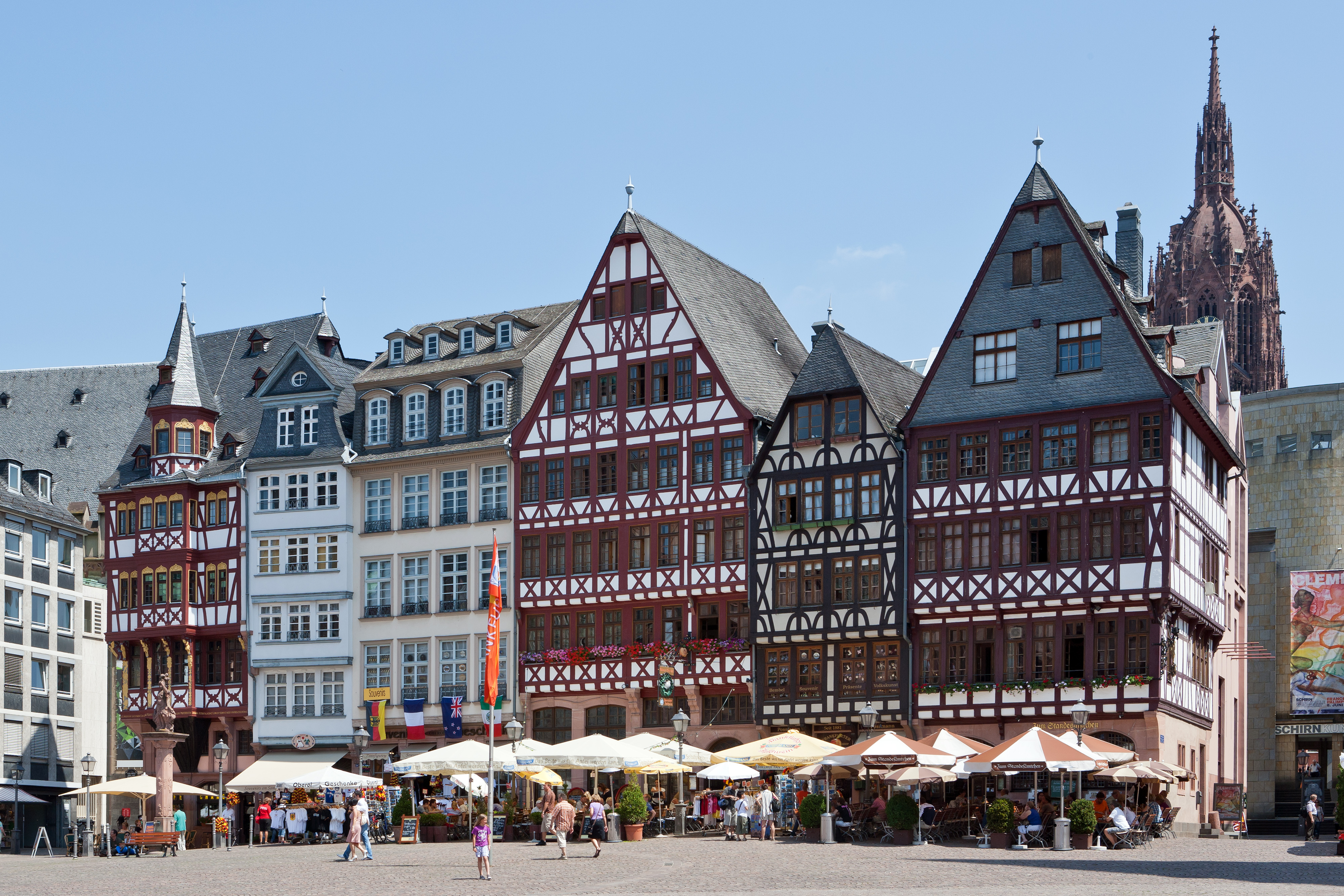
Römerberg

The former Altstadt (old town) quarter between the Römer and the Frankfurt Cathedral was redeveloped as the Dom-Römer Quarter from 2012 to 2018, including 15 reconstructions of historical buildings that were destroyed during World War II.

=== Frankfurt Cathedral ===
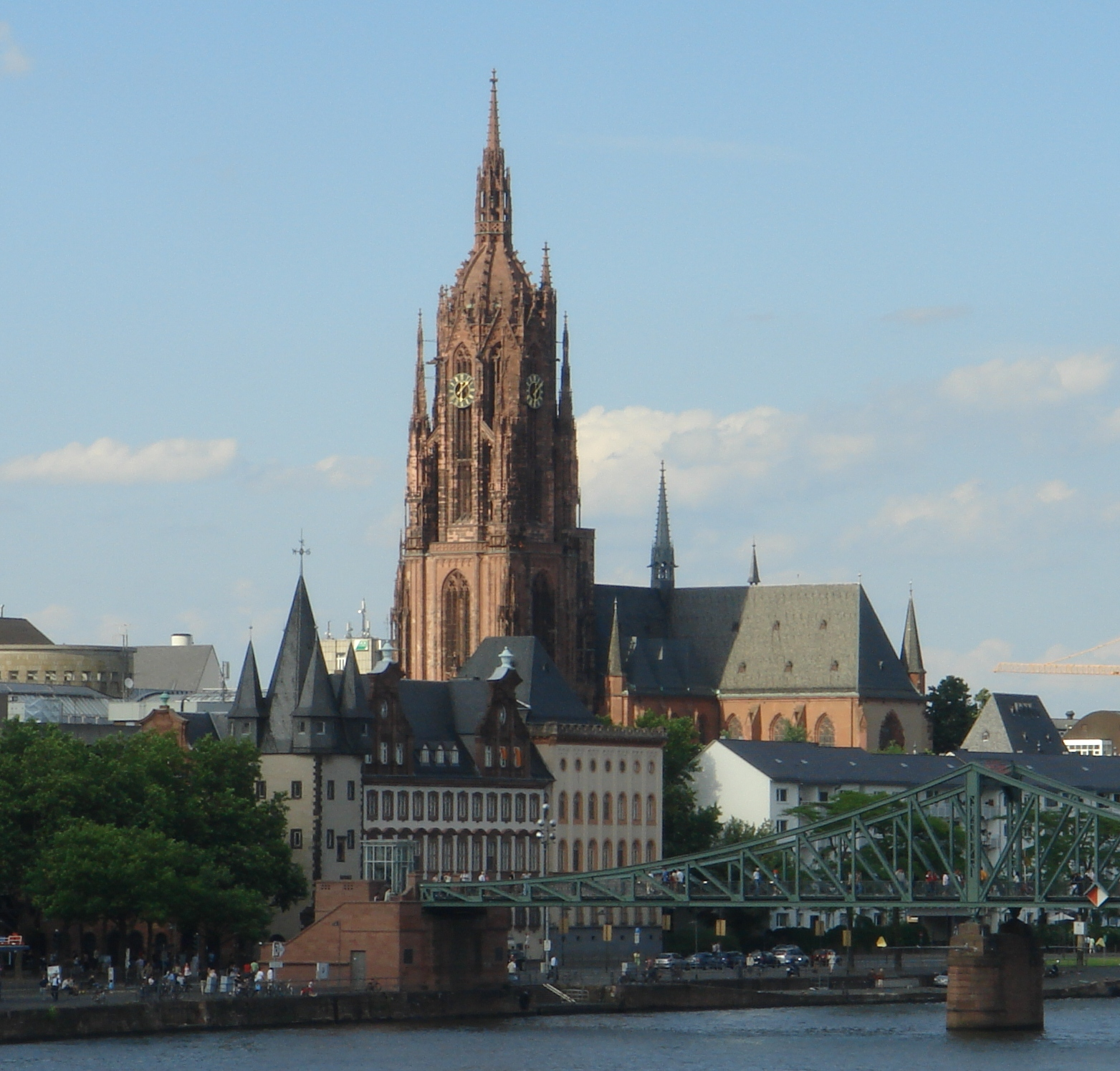
Frankfurt Cathedral

Frankfurt Cathedral (Frankfurter Dom) is not a cathedral, but the main Catholic church, dedicated to St. Bartholomew. The Gothic building was constructed in the 14th and 15th centuries on the foundation of an earlier church from the Merovingian time. From 1356 onwards, kings of the Holy Roman Empire were elected in this church, and from 1562 to 1792, Roman-German emperors were crowned there.

Since the 18th century, St. Bartholomew's has been called Dom, although it was never a bishop's seat. In 1867 it was destroyed by fire and rebuilt in its present style. It was again partially destroyed in World War II and rebuilt in the 1950s. Its height is 95 m (312 ft). The cathedral tower has a viewing platform open to the public at a height of 66 m (217 ft), accessed through a narrow spiral staircase with 386 steps.

=== Central Station ===
Frankfurt Central Station (Frankfurt Hauptbahnhof), which opened in 1888, was built as the central train station for Frankfurt to replace three smaller downtown train stations and to boost the needed capacity for travellers. It was constructed as a terminus station and was the largest train station in Europe by floor area until 1915 when Leipzig Central Station was opened. Its three main halls were constructed in a neo-Renaissance style, while the later enlargement with two outer halls in 1924 was constructed in neoclassical style.

=== Alte Oper ===
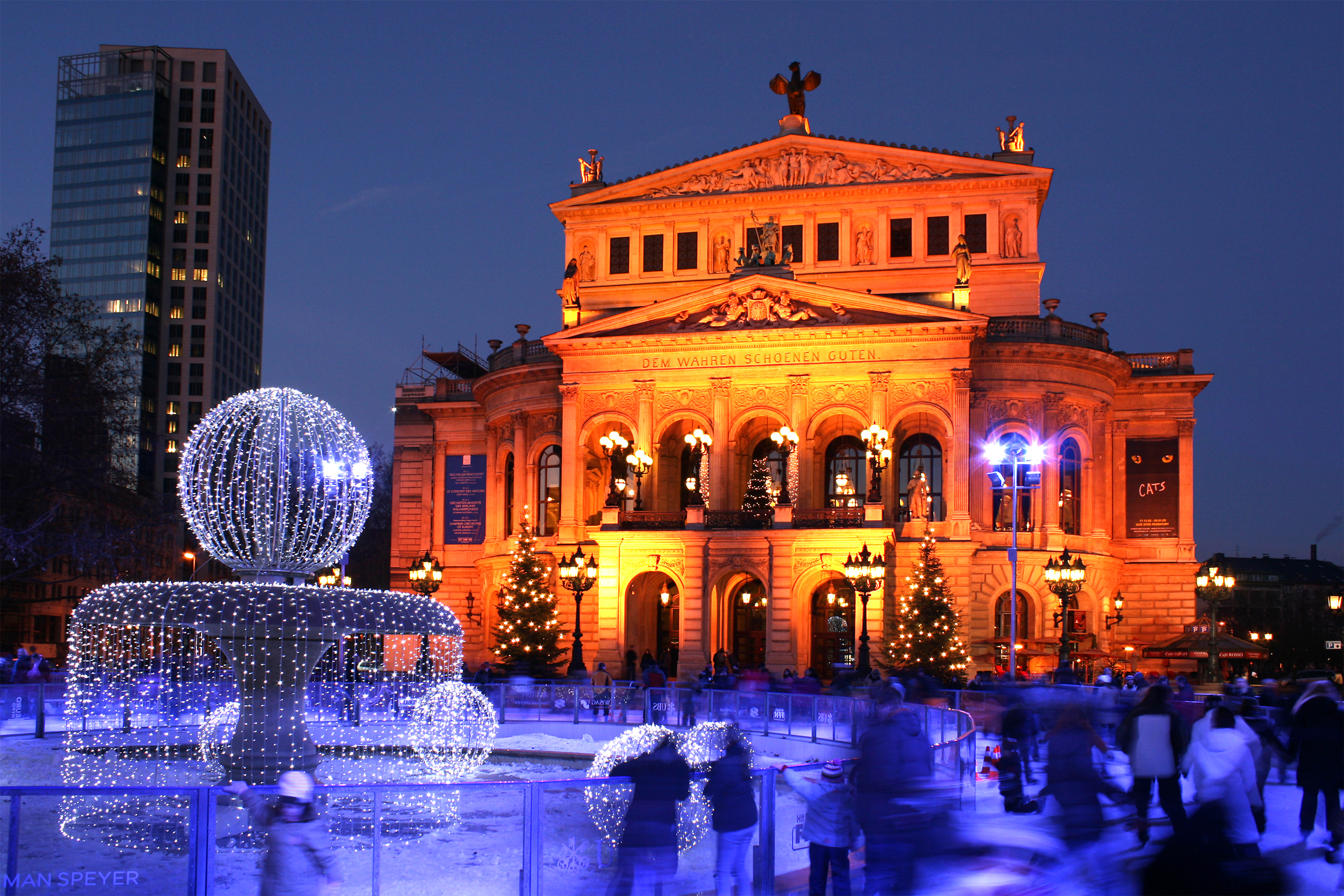
Alte Oper, now a concert hall, at Opernplatz

The Alte Oper is a former opera house, hence the name "Old Opera". The opera house was built in 1880 by architect Richard Lucae. It was one of the major opera houses in Germany until it was heavily damaged in World War II. Until the late 1970s, it was a ruin, nicknamed "Germany's most beautiful ruin". Former Frankfurt Lord Mayor Rudi Arndt called for blowing it up in the 1960s, which earned him the nickname "Dynamite-Rudi". (Later on, Arndt said he never had meant his suggestion seriously.)

Public pressure led to its refurbishment and reopening in 1981. Today, it functions as a famous concert hall, while operas are performed at the "new" Frankfurt Opera. The inscription on the frieze of the Alte Oper says: "Dem Wahren, Schönen, Guten" ("To the true, the beautiful, the good").

=== St. Paul's Church ===
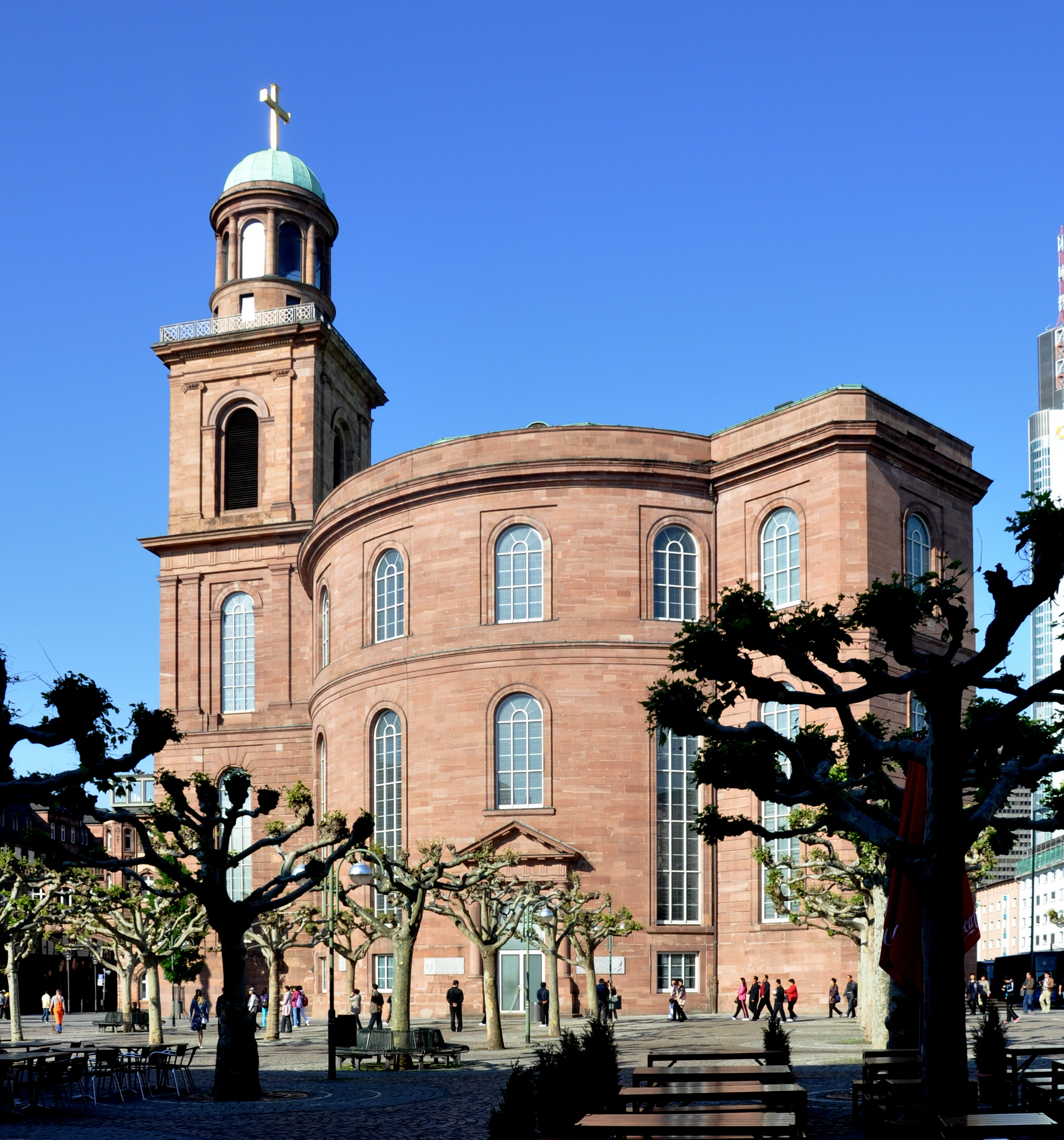
St. Paul's Church

St. Paul's Church is a national historic monument in Germany because it was the seat of the first democratically elected parliament in 1848. It was established in 1789 as a Protestant church, but was not completed until 1833. Its importance has its roots in the Frankfurt Parliament, which met in the church during the revolutionary years of 1848/49 in order to write a constitution for a united Germany. The attempt failed because the monarchs of Prussia and Austria did not want to lose power. In 1849, Prussian troops ended the democratic experiment by force and the parliament dissolved; the building was once more used for religious services.

St. Paul's was partially destroyed in World War II with its interior significantly damaged. It was quickly and symbolically rebuilt after the war albeit with modern alterations particularly to the interior; today it is used mainly for exhibitions and events.

=== Archäologischer Garten Frankfurt ===
The Archaeological Garden contains small parts of the oldest recovered buildings: an ancient Roman settlement and the Frankfurt Royal Palace (Kaiserpfalz Frankfurt) from the sixth century. The garden is located between the Römerberg and the cathedral. It was discovered after World War II when the area was heavily bombed and later partly rebuilt. The remains were preserved and are now open to the public. From 2013 until 2015 an event building, the Stadthaus ("City house"), has been built on top of the garden, but it remains open to the public free of charge.

=== Haus Wertheim ===
Wertheim House is the only timbered house in the Altstadt district that survived the heavy bombings of World War II undamaged. It is located on the Römerberg next to the Historical Museum.

=== Saalhof ===
The Saalhof is the oldest conserved building in the Altstadt district and dates to the 12th century. It was used as an exhibition hall by Dutch clothiers when trade fairs were held during the 14th and 15th centuries. The Saalhof was partly destroyed in World War II and later rebuilt. Today it serves as a part of the Historical Museum.

=== Eiserner Steg ===
The Eiserner Steg (Iron Bridge) is a pedestrian-only bridge across the Main that connects Römerberg and Sachsenhausen. It was built in 1868 and was the second bridge to cross the river. After World War II, when it was blown up by the Wehrmacht, it was quickly rebuilt in 1946. Today some 10,000 people cross the bridge on a daily basis.

=== German National Library ===
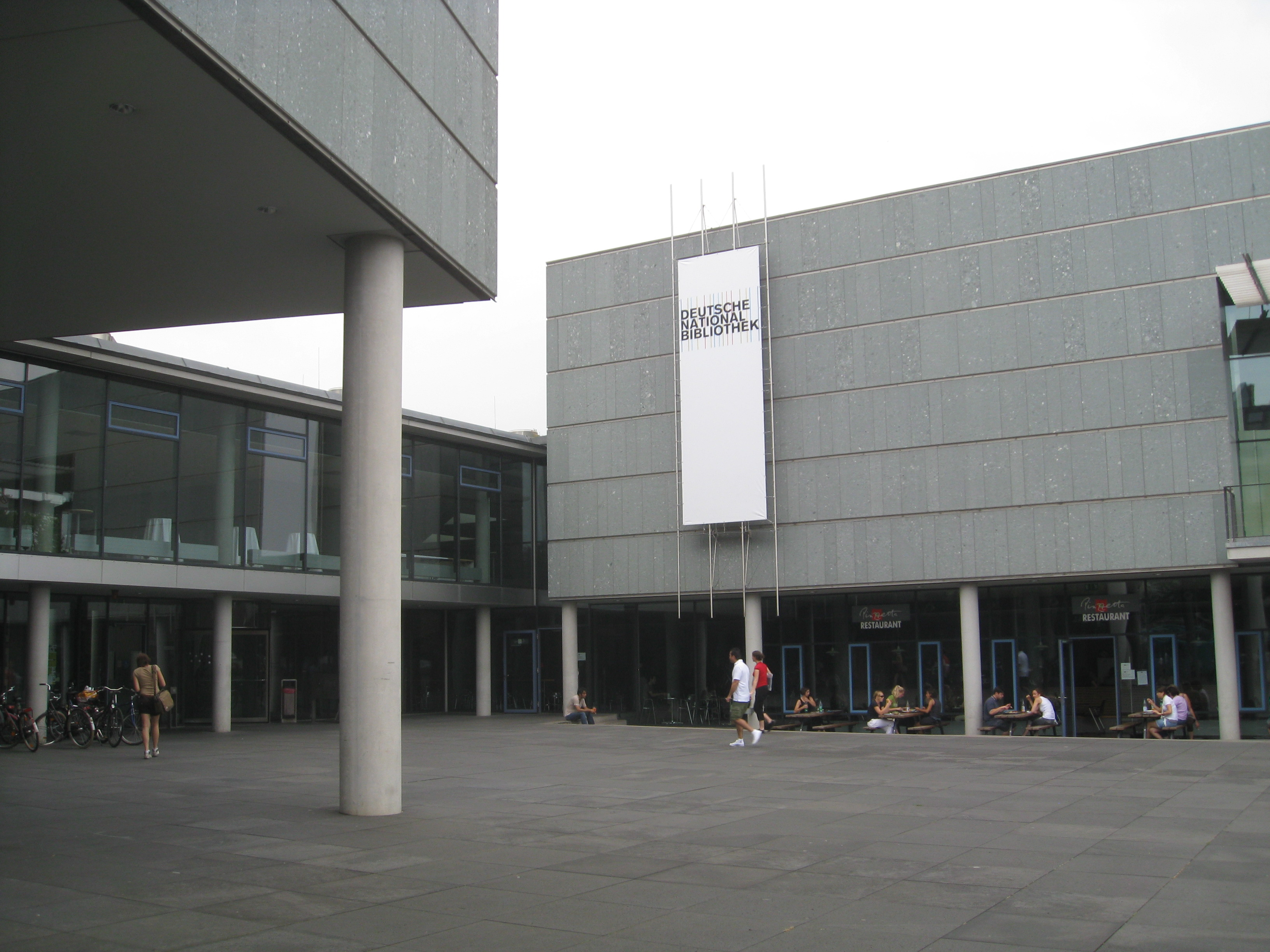
DNB building in Frankfurt

Frankfurt is one of two sites of the German National Library (Deutsche Nationalbibliothek), the other being Leipzig. The Deutsche Nationalbibliothek is a universal library in Germany. Its task, unique in Germany, is to collect, permanently archive, comprehensively document and record bibliographically all German and German-language publications from 1913 on, foreign publications about Germany, translations of German works and the works of German-speaking emigrants published abroad between 1933 and 1945, and to make them available to the public.

=== Eschenheimer Turm ===
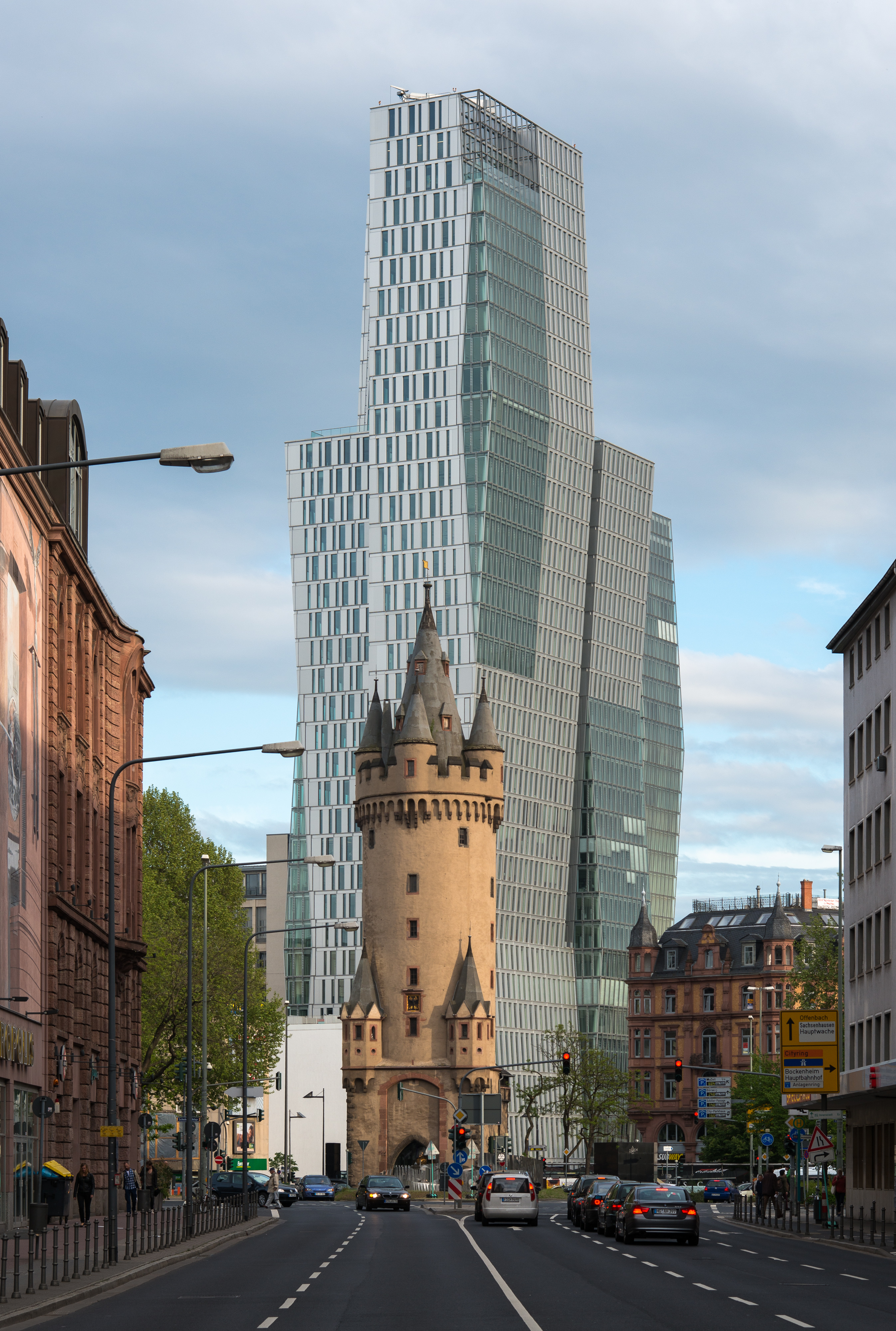
Eschenheimer Turm

The Eschenheim Tower (Eschenheimer Turm) was erected at the beginning of the 15th century and served as a city gate as part of late-medieval fortifications. It is the oldest and most unaltered building in the Innenstadt district.

=== St. Catherine's Church ===
St. Catherine's Church is the largest Protestant church, dedicated to Catherine of Alexandria, a martyred early Christian saint. It is located downtown at the entrance to the Zeil, the central pedestrian shopping street.

=== Hauptwache ===
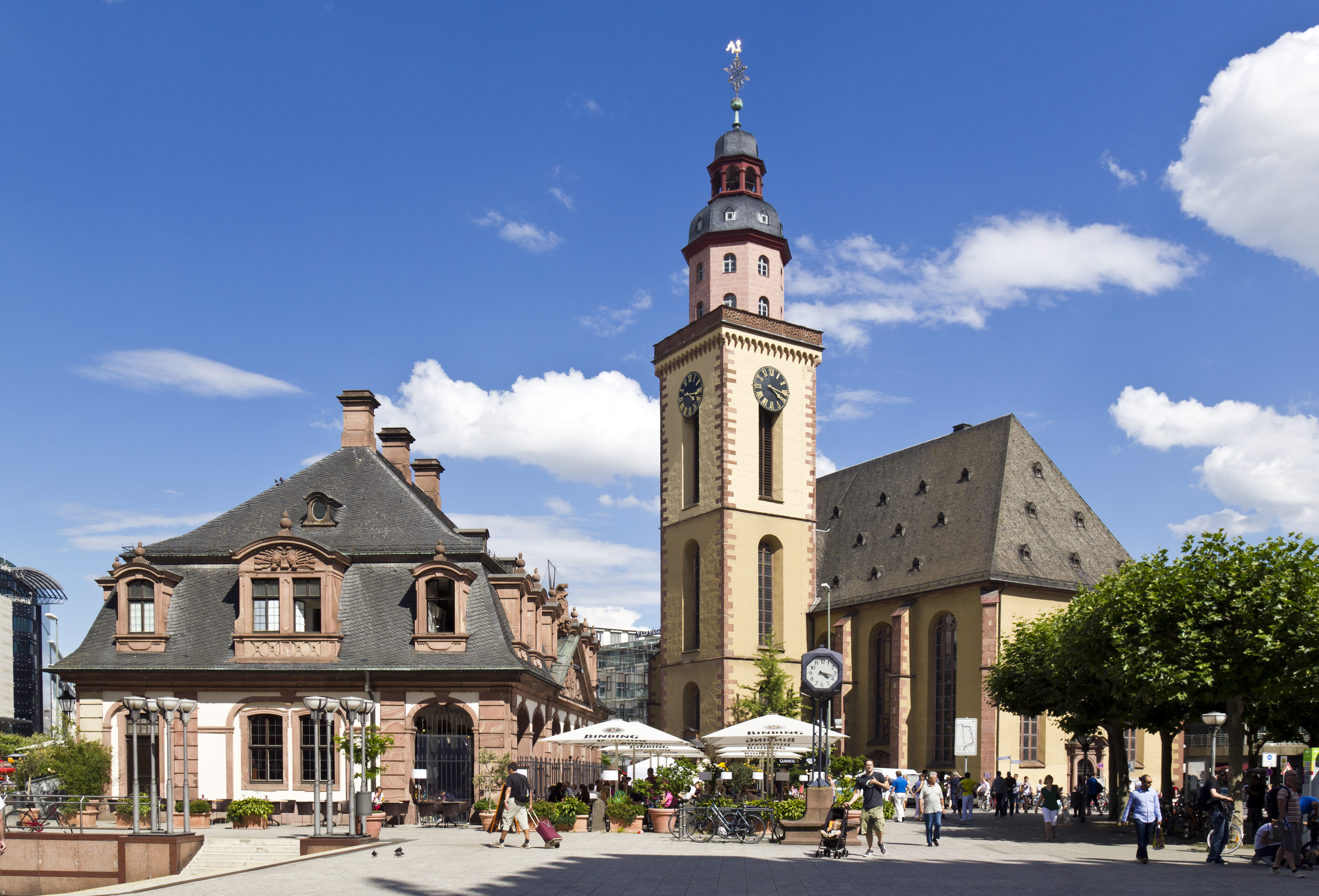
Hauptwache and St. Catherine's Church

Although today Hauptwache is mostly associated with the inner-city underground train station of the same name, the name originates from a baroque building on the square above the station. The Hauptwache building was constructed in 1730 and was used as a prison, therefore the name that translates as "main guard-house". Today the square surrounding the building is also called "Hauptwache" (formal "An der Hauptwache"). It is situated downtown opposite to St. Catherine's Church.

=== Frankfurter Hof ===
The Frankfurter Hof is a landmark downtown hotel at Kaiserplatz, built from 1872 to 1876. It is part of Steigenberger Hotels group and is considered the city's most prestigious.

=== St. Leonhard ===
St. Leonhard, on the Main close to the bridge Eiserner Steg, is a Catholic late Gothic hall church, derived from a Romanesque style basilica beginning in 1425. It is the only one of nine churches in the Old Town that survived World War II almost undamaged. The parish serves the English-speaking community. The church has been under restoration from 2011 until 2019.

=== Gründerzeit quarters ===
Around the city centre there are widespread quarters full of Gründerzeit architecture. Buildings of that type often sport richly decorated façades in the form of Historicism such as Gothic Revival, Renaissance Revival, German Renaissance and Baroque Revival.

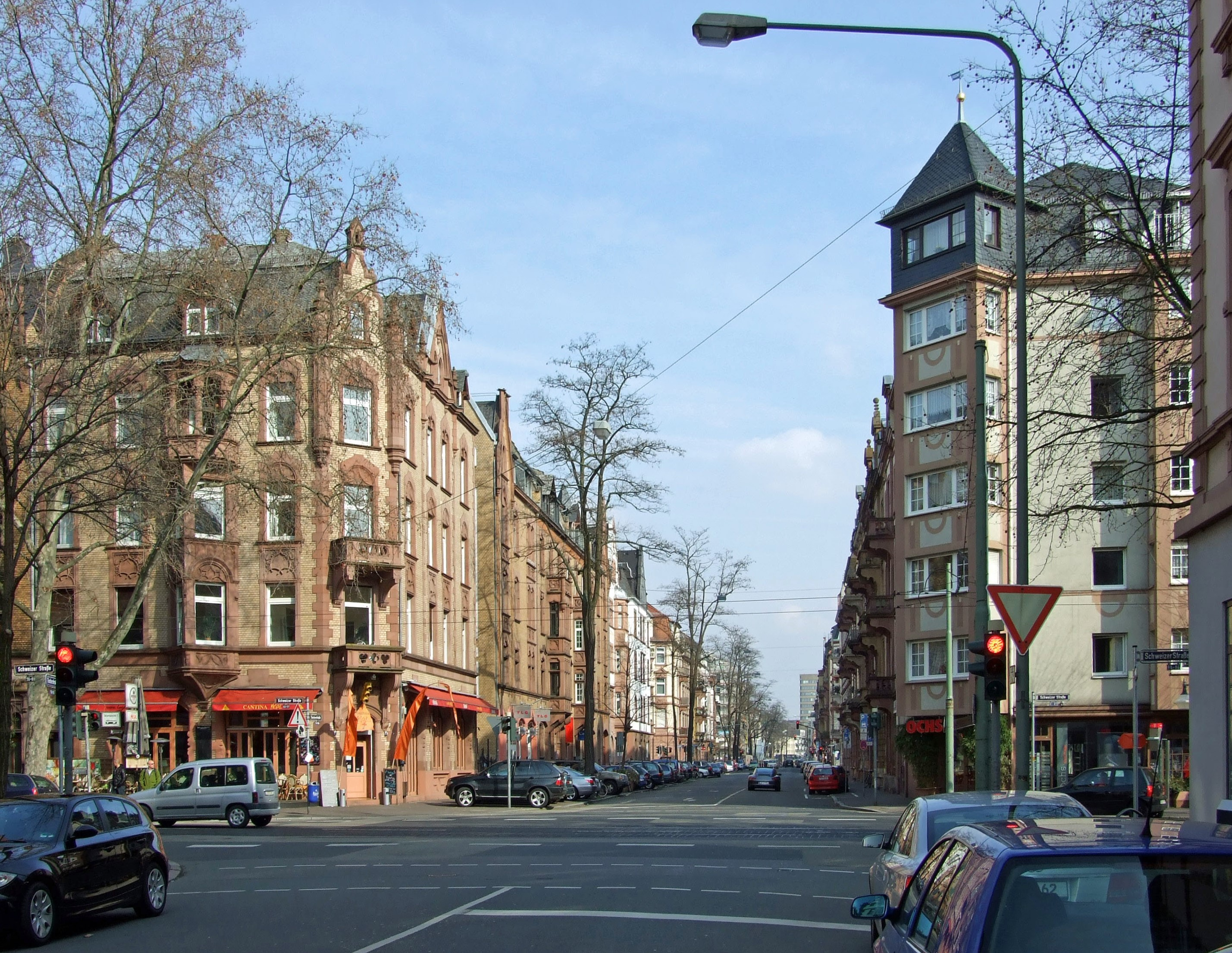
Sachsenhausen

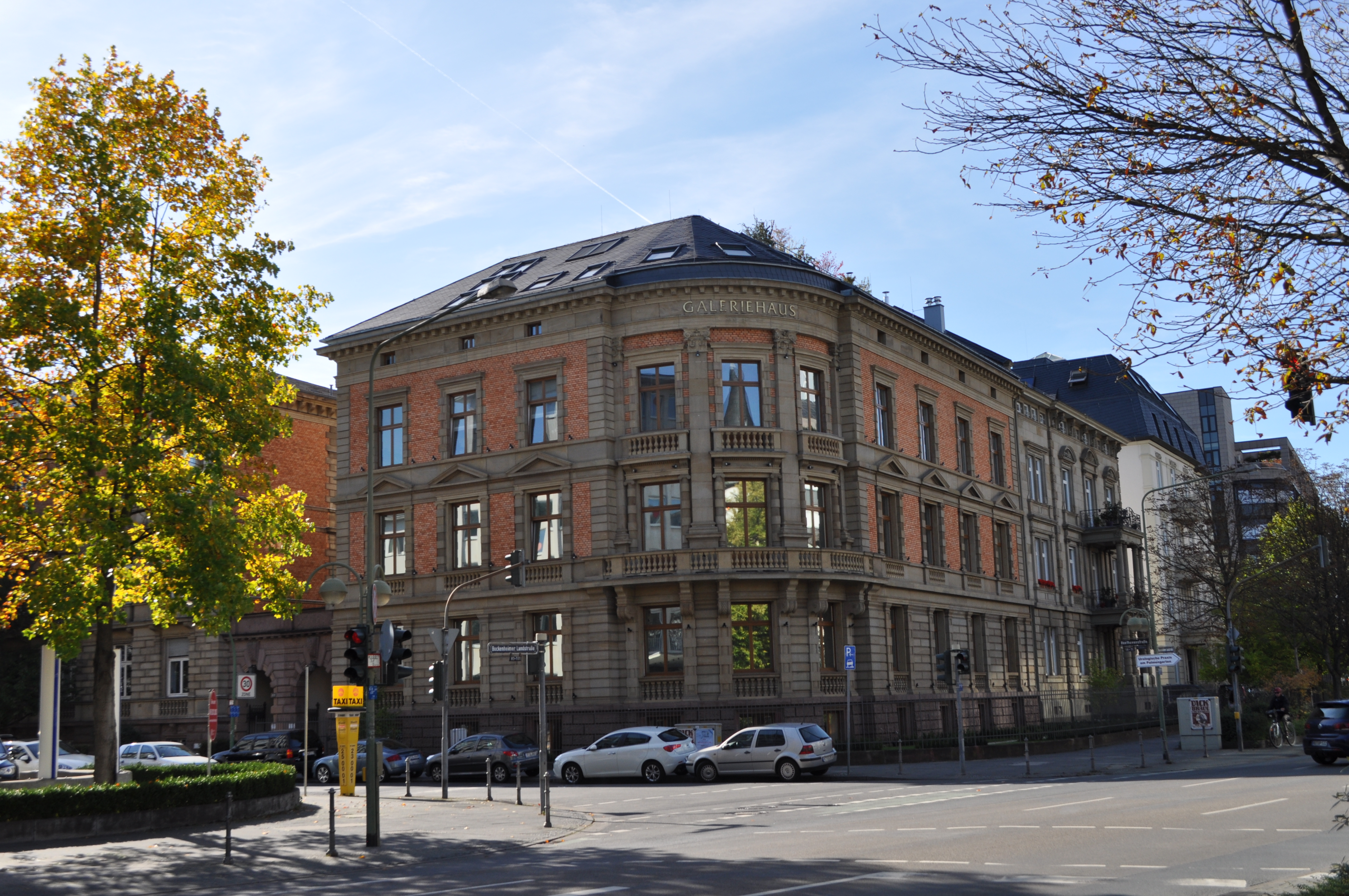
Westend

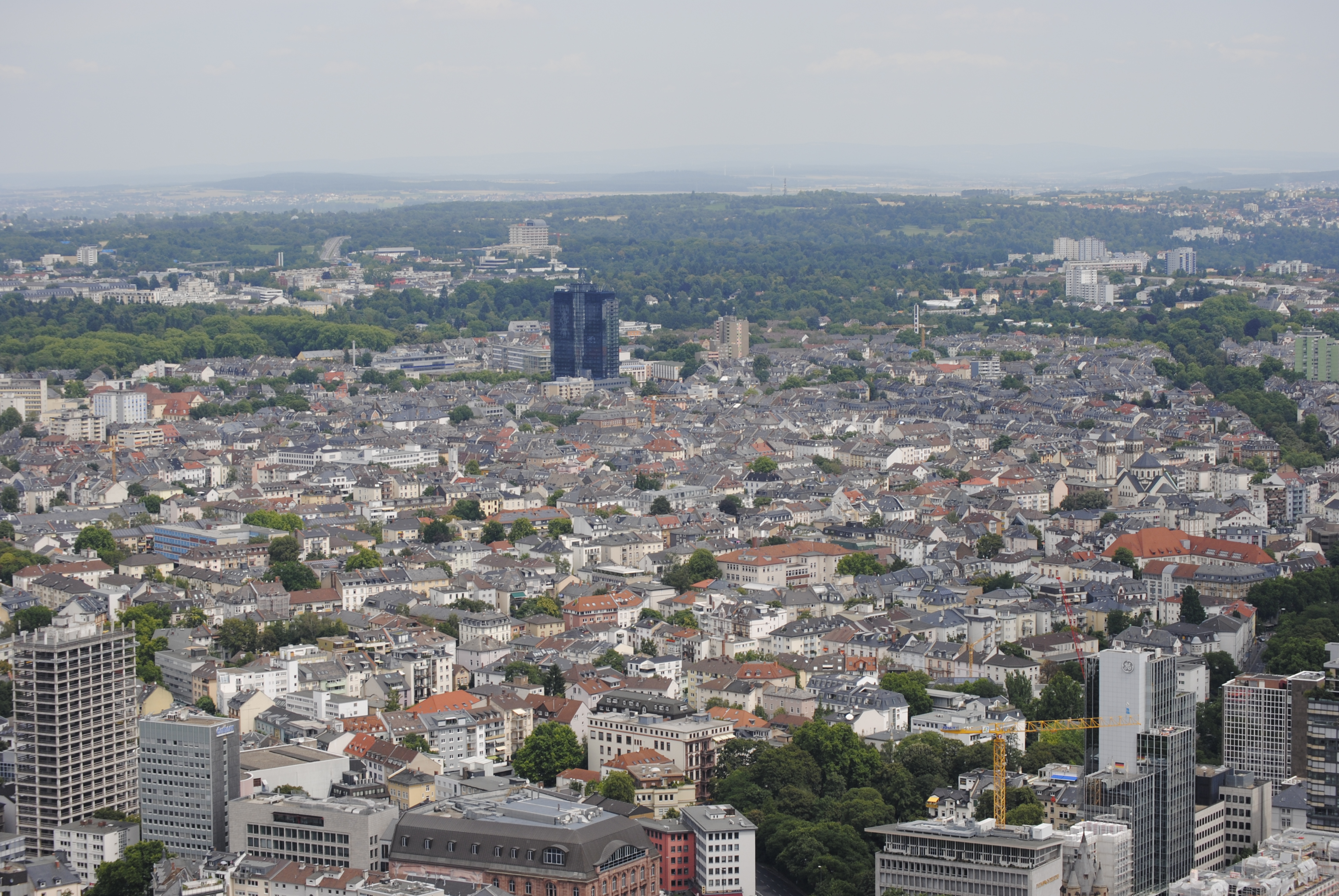
Nordend

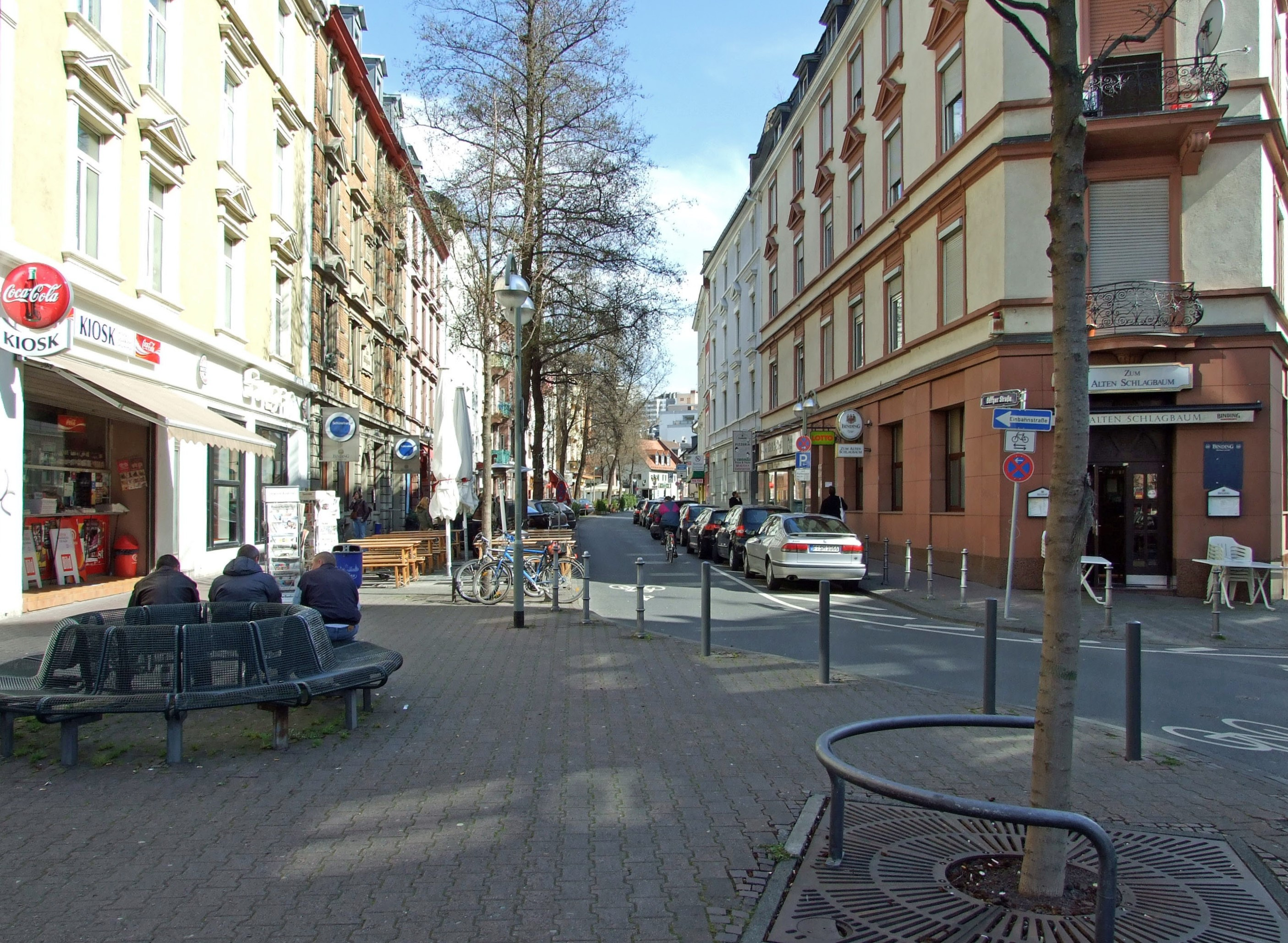
Bornheim

=== Timber-framed old towns ===
Around the city center of Frankfurt are several former independent villages, now part of the city, with timber-framed centres and even whole old towns like Höchst, Seckbach, Niederursel and Bergen-Enkheim. Overall there are around 14.500 buildings in Frankfurt built before 1919 and around 3.000 of them are timber framed houses.

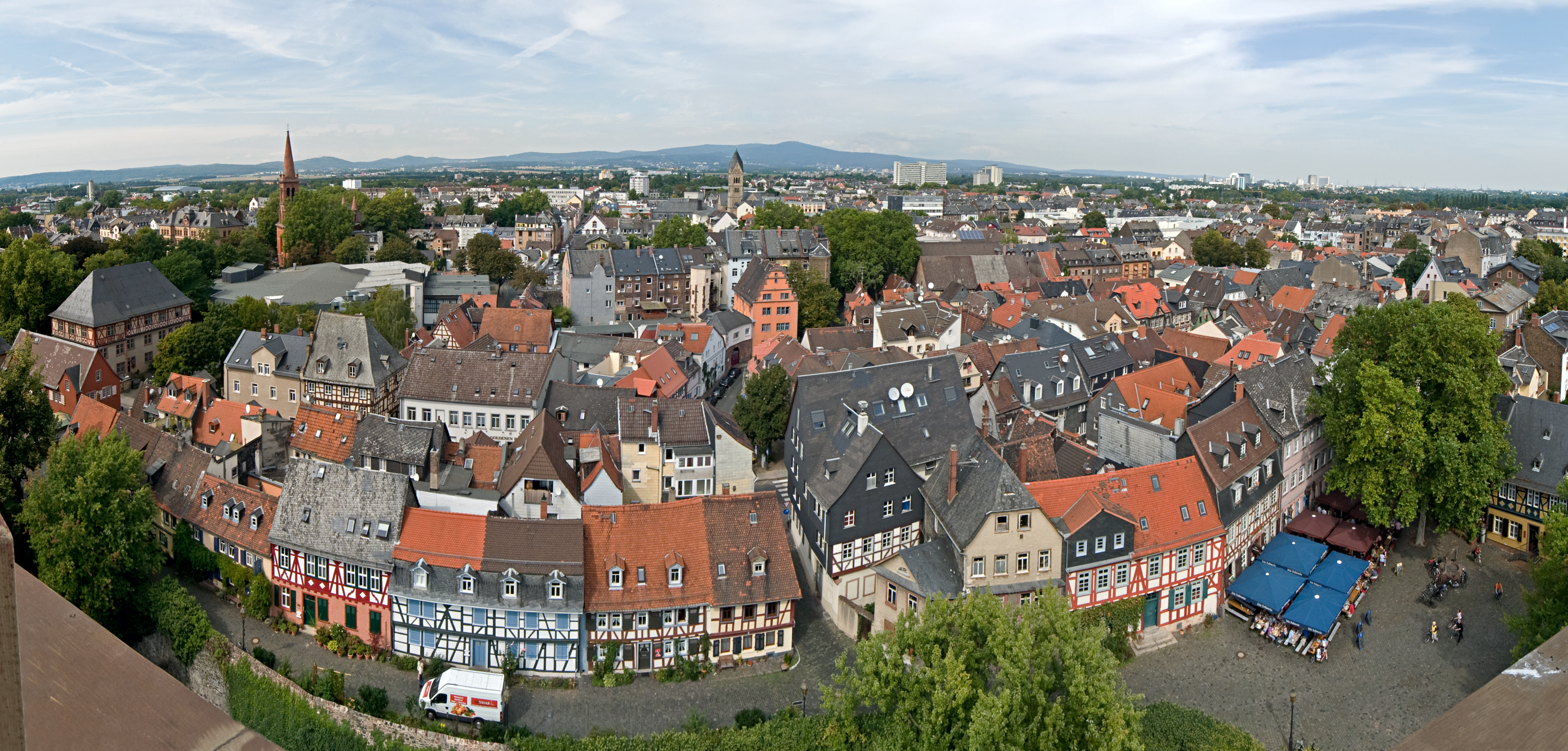
Höchst old town

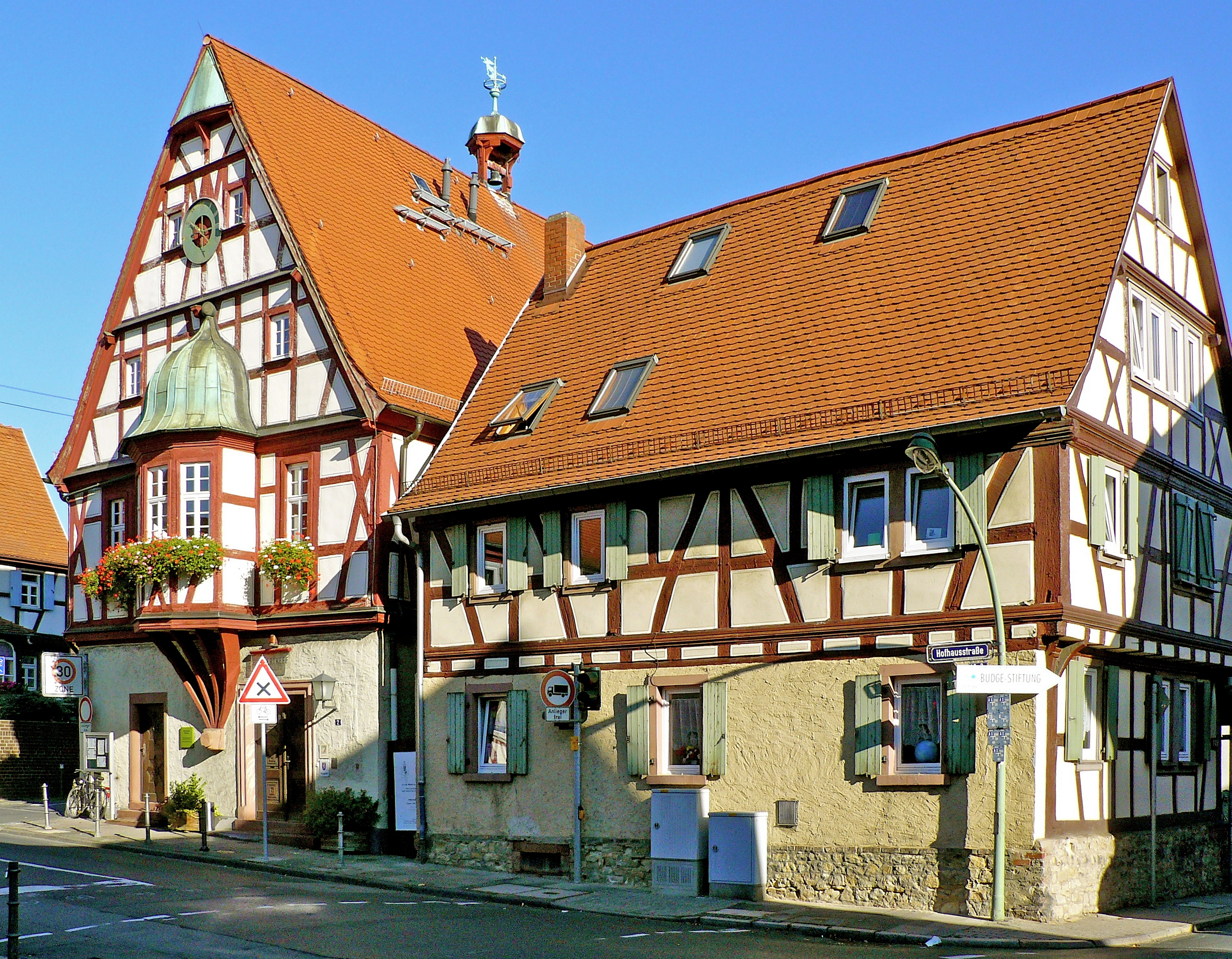
Seckbach

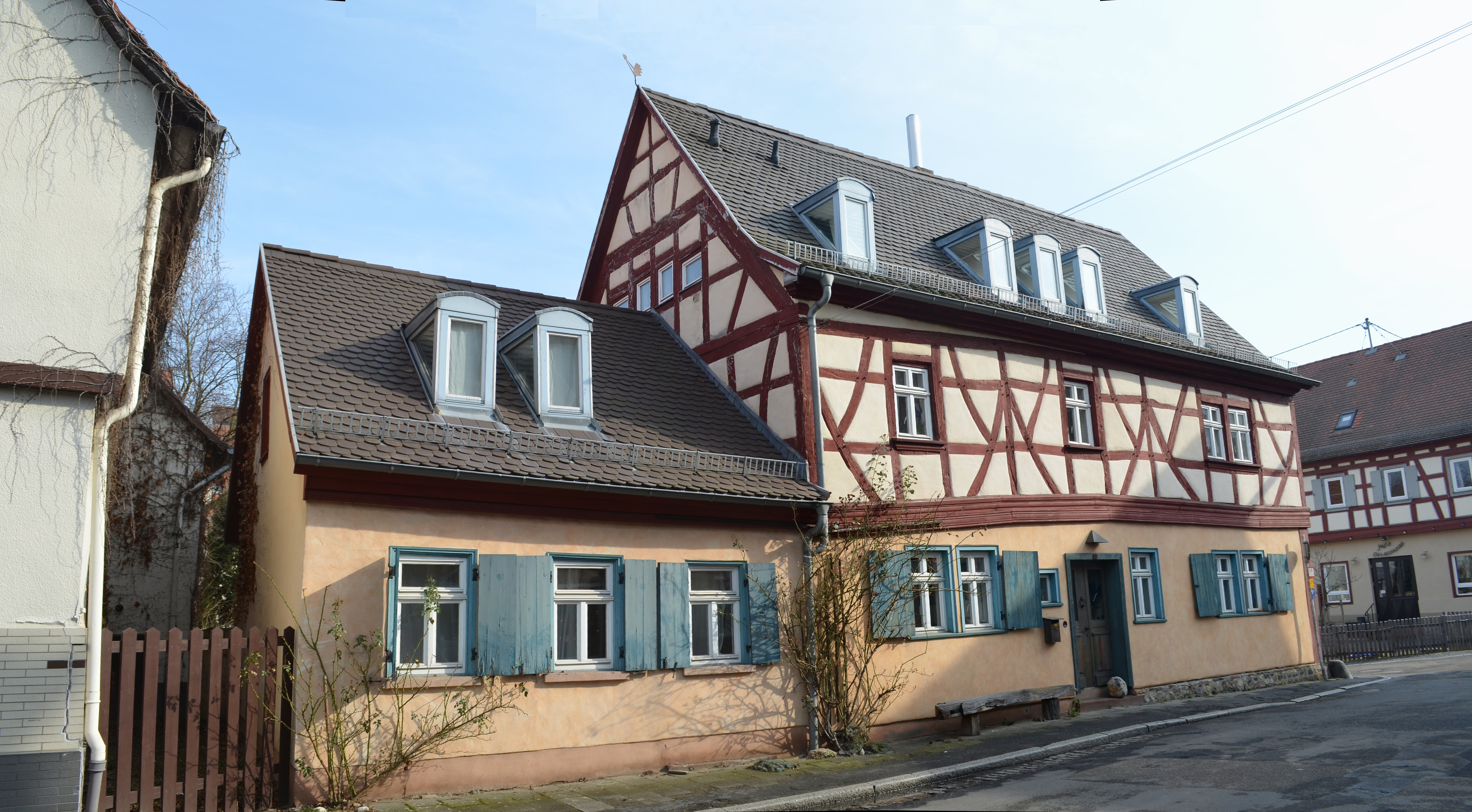
Niederursel

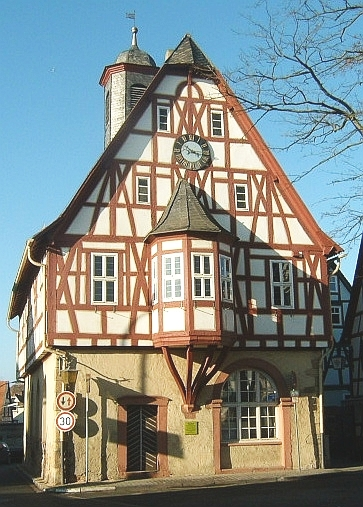
Bergen-Enkheim

== Architecture ==
=== 20th-century architecture ===
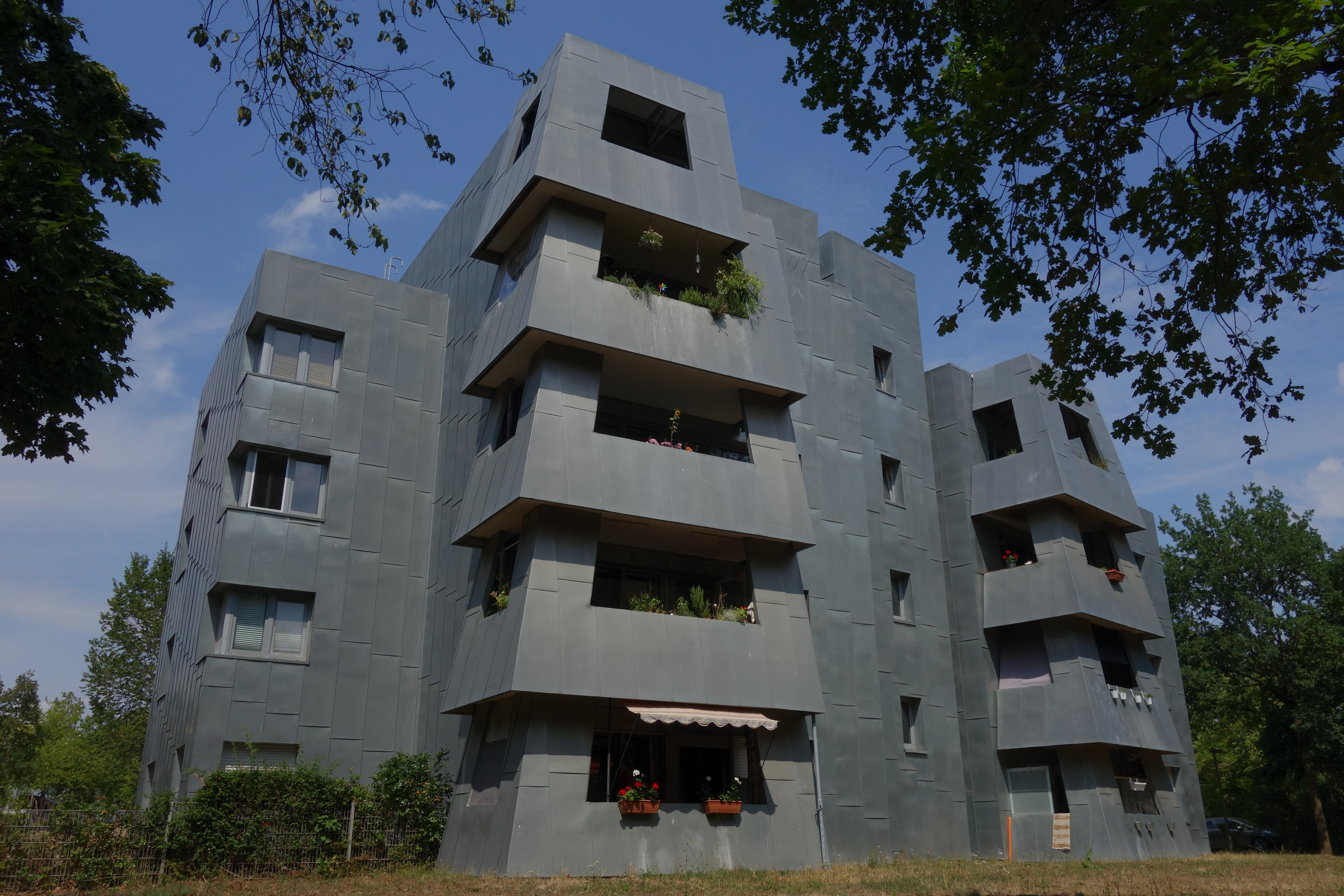
Public housing designed by Frank Gehry in Frankfurt-Schwanheim (1994-1996)

- Frauenfriedenskirche and Holy Cross Church), both consecrated in 1929, are examples of early modernist church buildings during the time of the New Frankfurt.
- Großmarkthalle, built 1926–1928 as a part of the New Frankfurt-project, the former wholesale market hall was repaired after the second world war and integrated into the new seat of the European Central Bank between 2010 and 2014.
- Goethe House, rebuilt 1947. The birthplace of Johann Wolfgang von Goethe from 1749 was destroyed in World War II and then rebuilt true to the original.
- Junior-Haus, built 1951, an example of early post-World War II architecture located at Kaiserplatz.
- Bayer-Haus, built 1952, another example of early post-World War II architecture.
- Museum für angewandte Kunst, built 1985, designed by Richard Meier.
- Gehry-Siedlung: A public housing area in Frankfurt-Schwanheim designed by Frank Gehry (built 1994-1996).
- IG Farben Building – Also known as Poelzig Building (Poelzig-Bau) after its architect Hans Poelzig, it was built from 1928 to 1930 as the corporate headquarters of I.G. Farbenindustrie AG. It is located in the Westend district and borders Grüneburgpark in the west. Upon its completion, the complex was the largest office building in Europe and remained so until the 1950s. The building served as headquarters for research projects relating to the development of synthetic oil and rubber and the manufacturing of magnesium, lubricating oil, explosives, methanol, and Zyklon B, the lethal gas used in concentration camps. After World War II, it served as the headquarters for the Supreme Allied Command and from 1949 to 1952 the High Commissioner for Germany (HICOG). It became the principal location for implementing the Marshall Plan, which largely financed the post-war reconstruction of Europe. The state apparatus of the Federal German Government was devised there. It served as the headquarters for the US Army's V Corps and the Northern Area Command (NACOM) until 1995 when the US Army returned control of the IG Farben Building to the German government. It was purchased on behalf of the Goethe University Frankfurt by the state of Hesse. In October 2001 it became part of the Westend Campus of Goethe University.
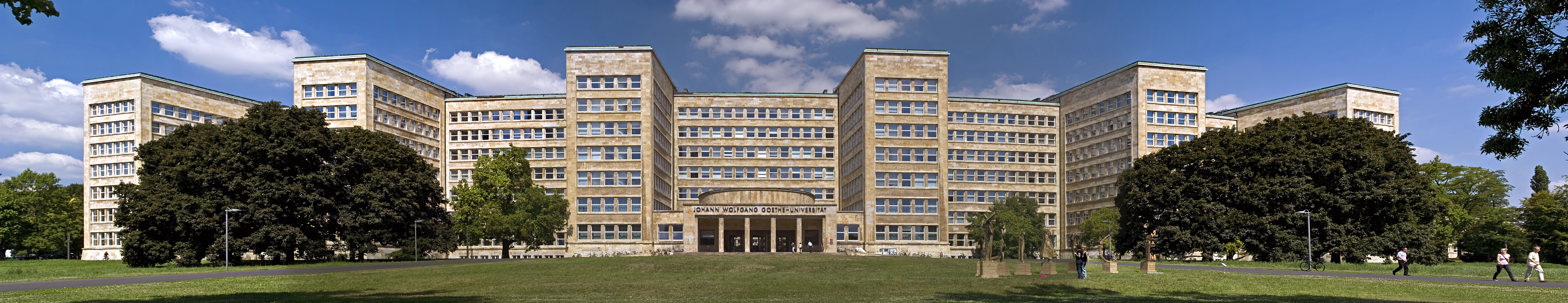
IG Farben Building, now the central lecture building of the Westend Campus of the Goethe University

=== 21st-century architecture ===
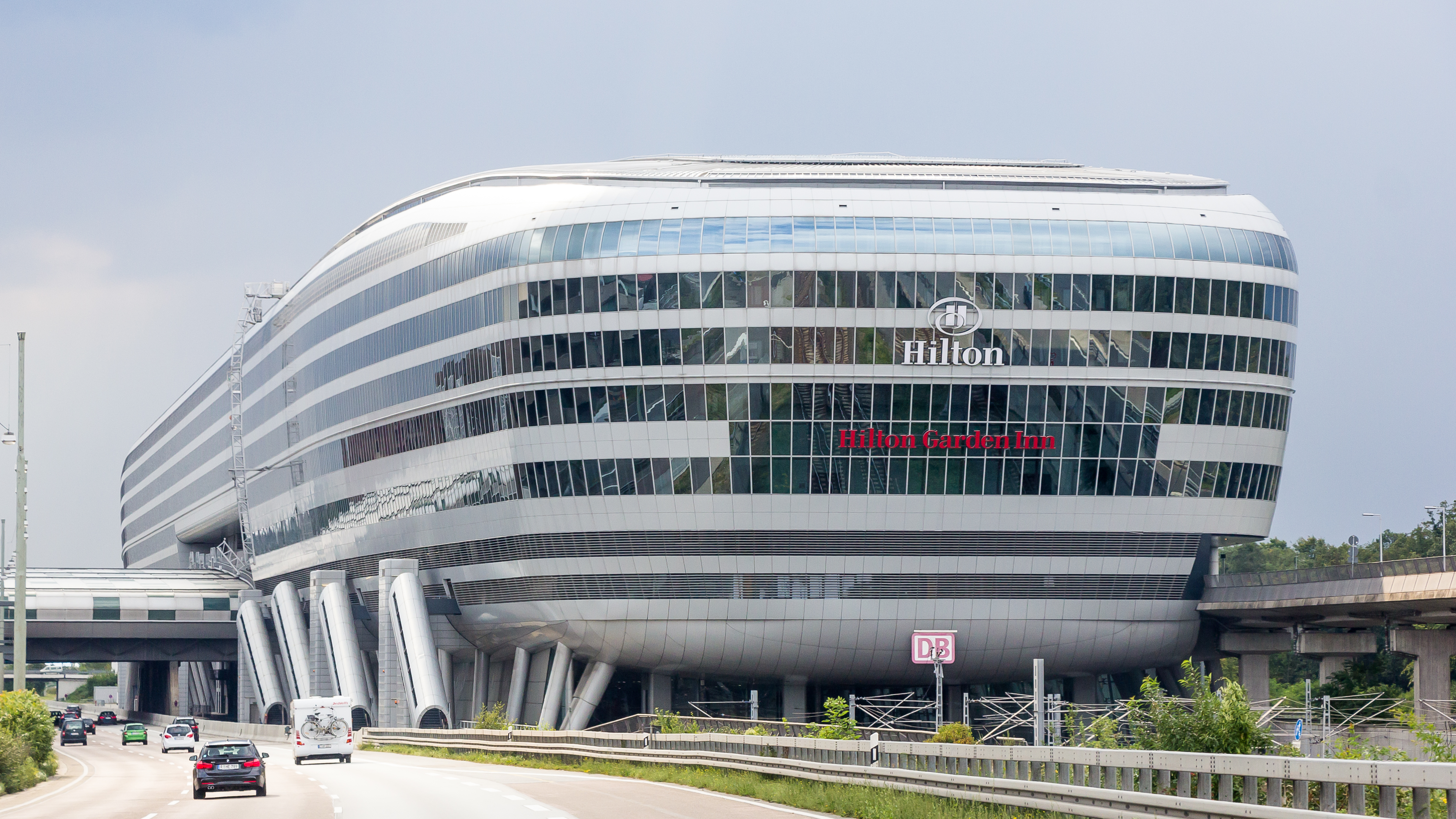
The Squaire in 2017

- Die Welle (The Wave), built 1998–2003, a complex of three wavelike-formed office buildings next to the Opernplatz.
- Alte Stadtbibliothek, rebuilt 2003–2005, reconstruction of the old public library house originally built 1820–1825.
- Palais Thurn und Taxis, rebuilt 2004–2009, reconstruction of a palace originally built 1731–1739.
- MyZeil, built 2004–2009, shopping mall at the Zeil with an imposing vaulted glass-structure.
- The Squaire (portmanteau of square and air), also known as Airrail Center Frankfurt, is a 660 m (2,165.35 ft) long and 45 m (147.64 ft) tall office building located at Frankfurt Airport. It was built from 2006 to 2011 on top of an existing railway station (Frankfurt Airport long distance Station) and has a connecting bridge to Terminal 1 for pedestrians. Its total of 140,000 m^{2} (1,506,947 sq ft) rentable floor space makes it Germany's largest office building.

=== Skyscrapers ===
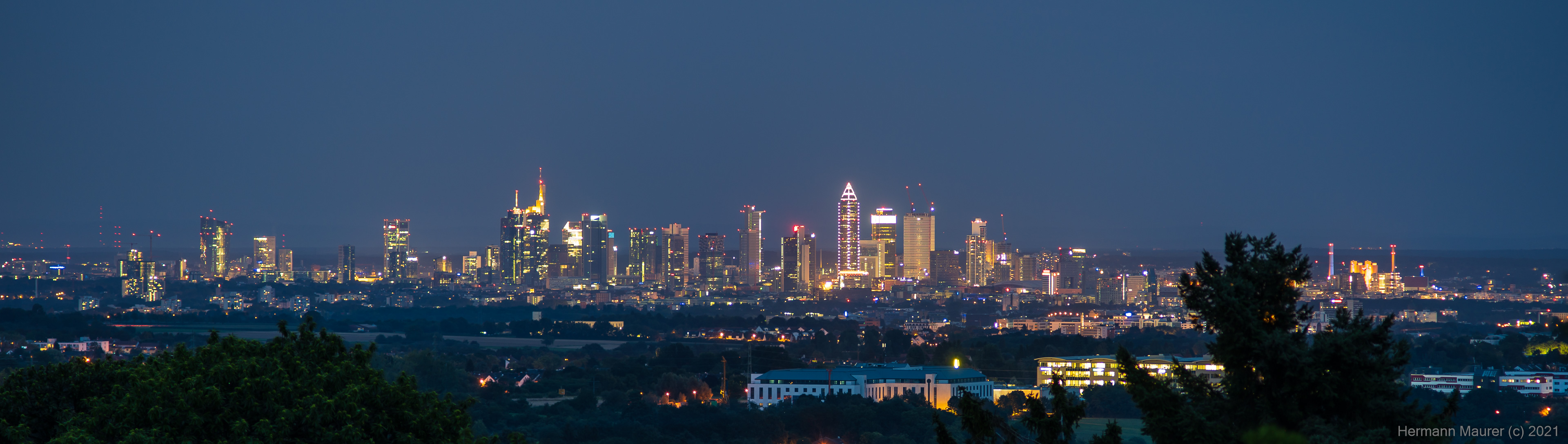
View of Frankfurt from the Taunus

Frankfurt is unique among German cities with regards to skyscrapers. Since the 1970s some of the tallest buildings in Germany have been built along the Mainzer Landstrasse. The Main Tower was completed in 1999 with its top floor skydeck and penthouse restaurant designed to be open to tourists. Frankfurt hosts 20 out of Germany's 21 skyscrapers. Most skyscrapers and high-rise office buildings are located in the financial district (Bankenviertel), around the trade fair premises (Europaviertel) and at Mainzer Landstraße between Opernplatz and Platz der Republik, which connects the two areas.

The 20 skyscrapers are:

- Commerzbank Tower, 259.0 m (849.74 ft) – designed by Norman Foster, when the tower was completed in 1997 it was the tallest building in Europe with 259 meters. It is still the tallest building in Frankfurt and constructed in steel.
- Messeturm, 256.5 m (841.54 ft) – The EU's third-tallest building, the tallest building in Europe 1990–1997; main tenant is Goldman Sachs (Germany).
- Four I, 233.0 m (764.44 ft)
- Westend Tower, 208.0 m (682.41 ft) – DZ Bank headquarters
- Main Tower, 200.0 m (656.17 ft) – Landesbank Hessen-Thüringen and Standard & Poor's (Germany) headquarters
- Tower 185, 200.0 m (656.17 ft) – PricewaterhouseCoopers (Germany) headquarters
- ONE, 191 m (626.64 ft)
- Omniturm, 190.0 m (623.36 ft)
- Trianon, 186.0 m (610.24 ft) – DekaBank headquarters
- Seat of the European Central Bank, 185.0 m (606.96 ft) – European Central Bank headquarters
- Grand Tower, 179.9 m (590.22 ft) – Tallest residential tower
- Four I, 179.0 m (587.27 ft) – Residential tower
- Opernturm, 170.0 m (557.74 ft) – UBS (Germany) headquarters
- Taunusturm, 170.0 m (557.74 ft)
- Silberturm, 166.3 m (545.60 ft) – Germany's tallest building 1978–1990, Main tenant is Deutsche Bahn.
- Westend Gate, 159.3 m (522.64 ft) – Germany's tallest building 1976–1978, Main tenant is Marriott Frankfurt Hotel.
- Deutsche Bank I, 155.0 m (508.53 ft) – Deutsche Bank headquarters
- Deutsche Bank II, 155.0 m (508.53 ft)
- Marienturm, 155.0 m (508.53 ft)
- Skyper, 153.8 m (504.59 ft) – Main tenant is DekaBank.

Other high-rise buildings include:

- Eurotower, 148.0 m (485.56 ft) – Former European Central Bank headquarters
- One Forty West, 145 m (475.72 ft) – Meliá Hotels International, Residential
- Frankfurter Büro Center, 142.4 m (467.19 ft) – Main tenant is Clifford Chance (Germany).
- City-Haus, 142.1 m (466.21 ft) – Main tenant is DZ Bank.
- Gallileo, 136.0 m (446.19 ft) – Main tenant is Commerzbank.
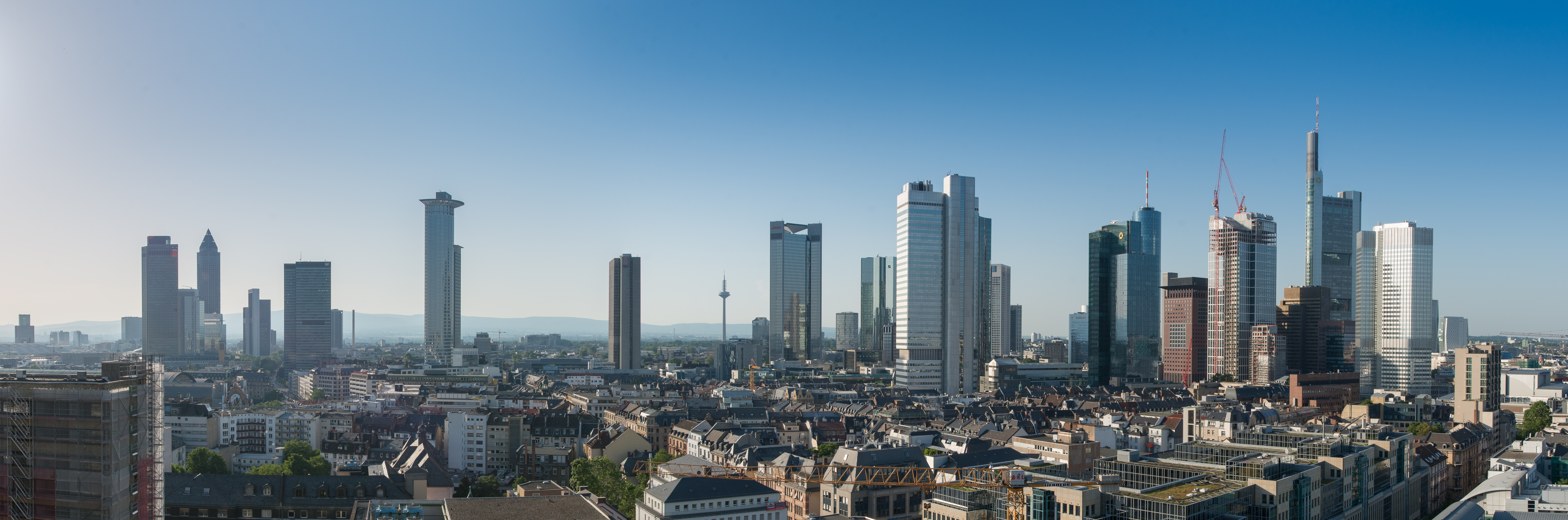
Frankfurt skyline in June 2013, view from south-west

=== History of high-rise buildings ===
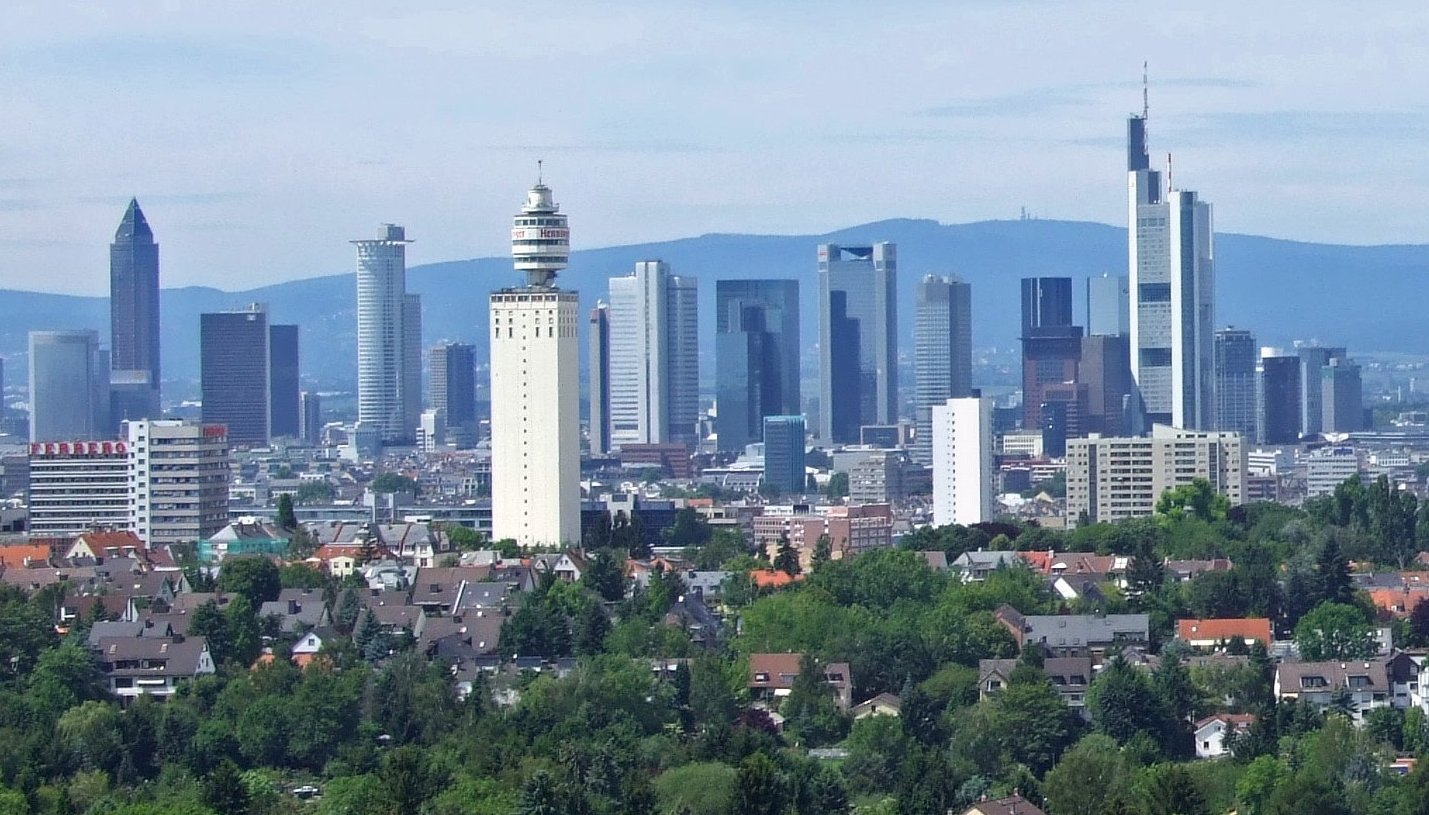
The original Henninger Turm in 2007

Skyline seen from Deutschherrnbrücke (2026)

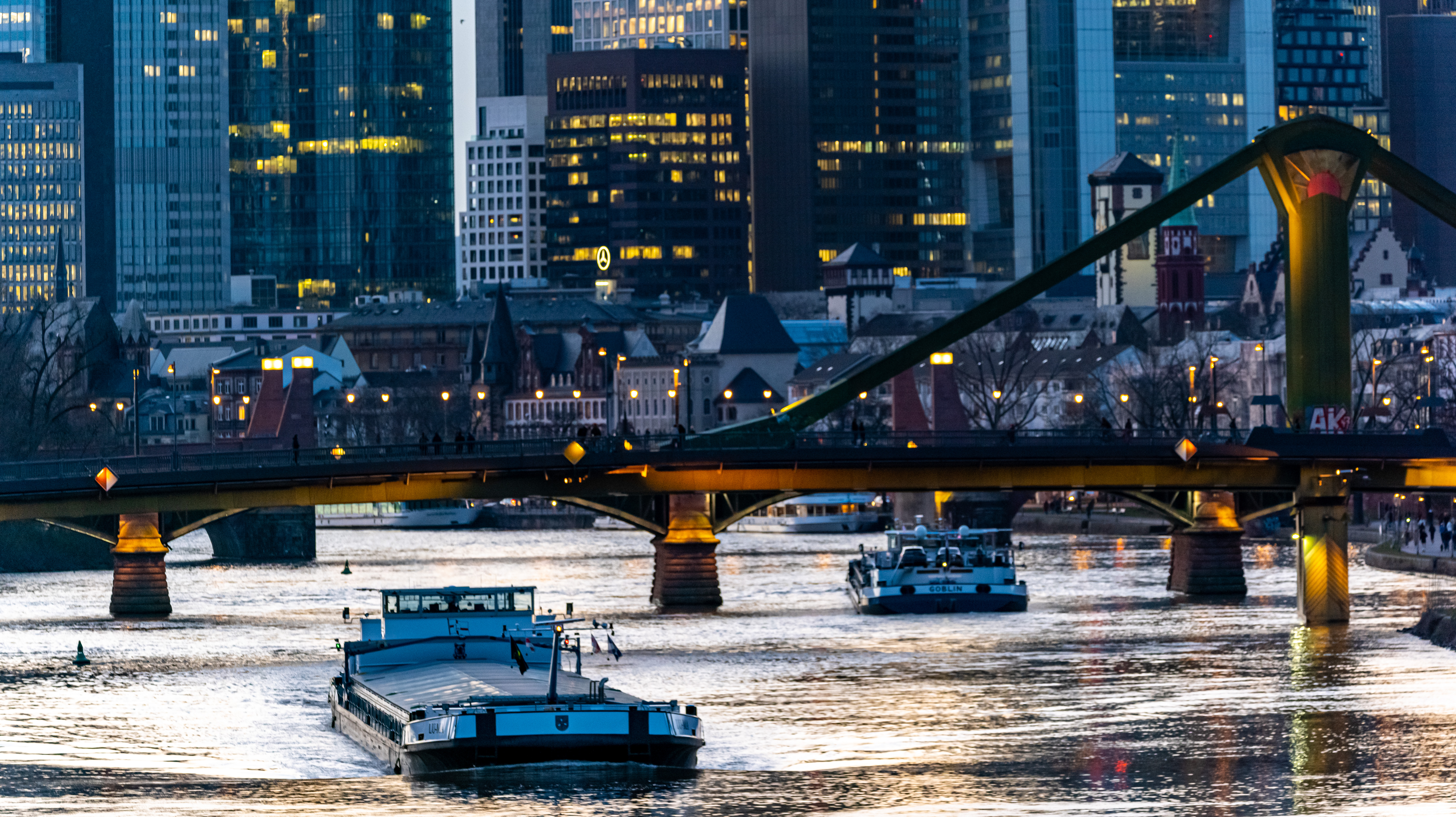
Bridges over River Main in Frankfurt 2023

The Henninger Turm was opened in the 1960s and the silo was topped by a revolving restaurant designed to be a landmark. The Henninger Turm was extensively refurbished and is now a residential high-rise.

The first high-rise building boom came in the 1970s when Westend Gate (then called Plaza Büro Center) and Silberturm were constructed and became the tallest buildings in Germany with a height of 159.3 meters and 166.3 meters, respectively. Around the same time, Frankfurter Büro Center and City-Haus (142.4 meters and 142.1 meters) were constructed at Mainzer Landstraße and Eurotower (148.0 meters) and Garden Tower (127.0 meters; then called Helaba-Hochhaus) were constructed in the financial district.

None of the buildings constructed during the 1980s surpassed Silberturm. The most famous buildings from this decade are the Deutsche Bank Twin Towers at Taunusanlage, both 155.0 meters tall.

The 1990s featured a second wave. Messeturm, built on the trade fair site, reached a height of 256.5 meters (842 ft) and became the tallest building in Europe by 1991. It was overtaken by the 259 m-high (850 ft) Commerzbank Tower in 1997. Other tall buildings from this decade are Westendstrasse 1 (208 meters (682 ft)), Main Tower (200 meters (660 ft)) and Trianon (186 meters (610 ft)).

In 21st-century Frankfurt, more high-rise buildings and skyscrapers (e.g., Skyper, Opernturm, Tower 185, Seat of the European Central Bank, Taunusturm) emerged, but none have surpassed Commerzbank Tower.

=== Other tall structures ===
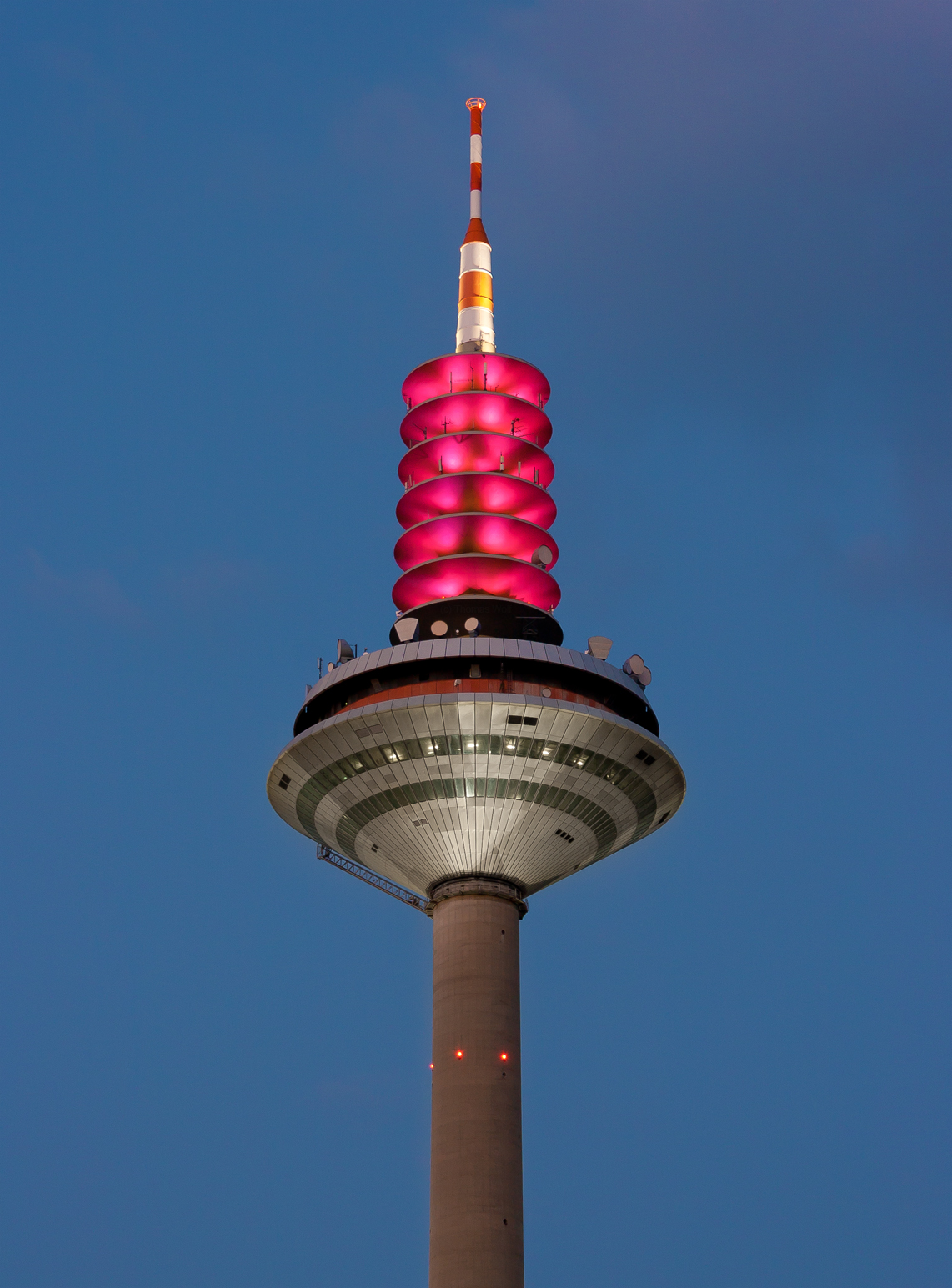
Top of the Europaturm, a 337 m (1,106 ft) communications tower

- Europaturm — The Europe Tower is a telecommunications tower, also known as the Frankfurt TV Tower, built from 1974 to 1979. With a height of 337.5 meters it is the tallest tower and the second tallest structure in Germany after the Fernsehturm Berlin. It was open to the public until 1999, with an entertainment establishment in the revolving top. It is normally referred to by locals as the "Ginnheimer Spargel" (Ginnheim Asparagus), but stands a few meters within Bockenheim district.
- Henninger Turm — The Henninger Tower was a 120-mete-high grain silo built from 1959 to 1961 and owned by Henninger Brewery. It was the highest structure until 1974. The Henninger Tower had two rotating restaurants at the height of 101 and 106 meters and an open-air observation deck at the height of 110 meters. The tower closed to the public in October 2002 and was demolished in 2013 to be replaced by a 140 m (459 ft) tall residential tower, which is externally inspired by the old Henninger Turm. The cornerstone for this project was laid in June 2014 and construction was completed in summer 2017. The new tower offers 207 luxury flats and houses the non-rotating restaurant "Franziska". From 1962 to 2008 a famous yearly cycling race was named after the tower, the "Radrennen Rund um den Henninger Turm" (Cycling race around Henninger Tower). The now-renamed race is still a yearly event.
- Goetheturm – The Goethe Tower was a 43 m-high (141 ft) tower on the northern edge of the Frankfurt City Forest in Sachsenhausen. It was the fifth tallest wood construction structure in Germany. It was built in 1931 and was a popular place for day-trippers until it burned down in 2017. A faithful reconstruction has been opened to the public on 12 October 2020, exactly three years after the original's destruction.

== Parks and green spaces ==
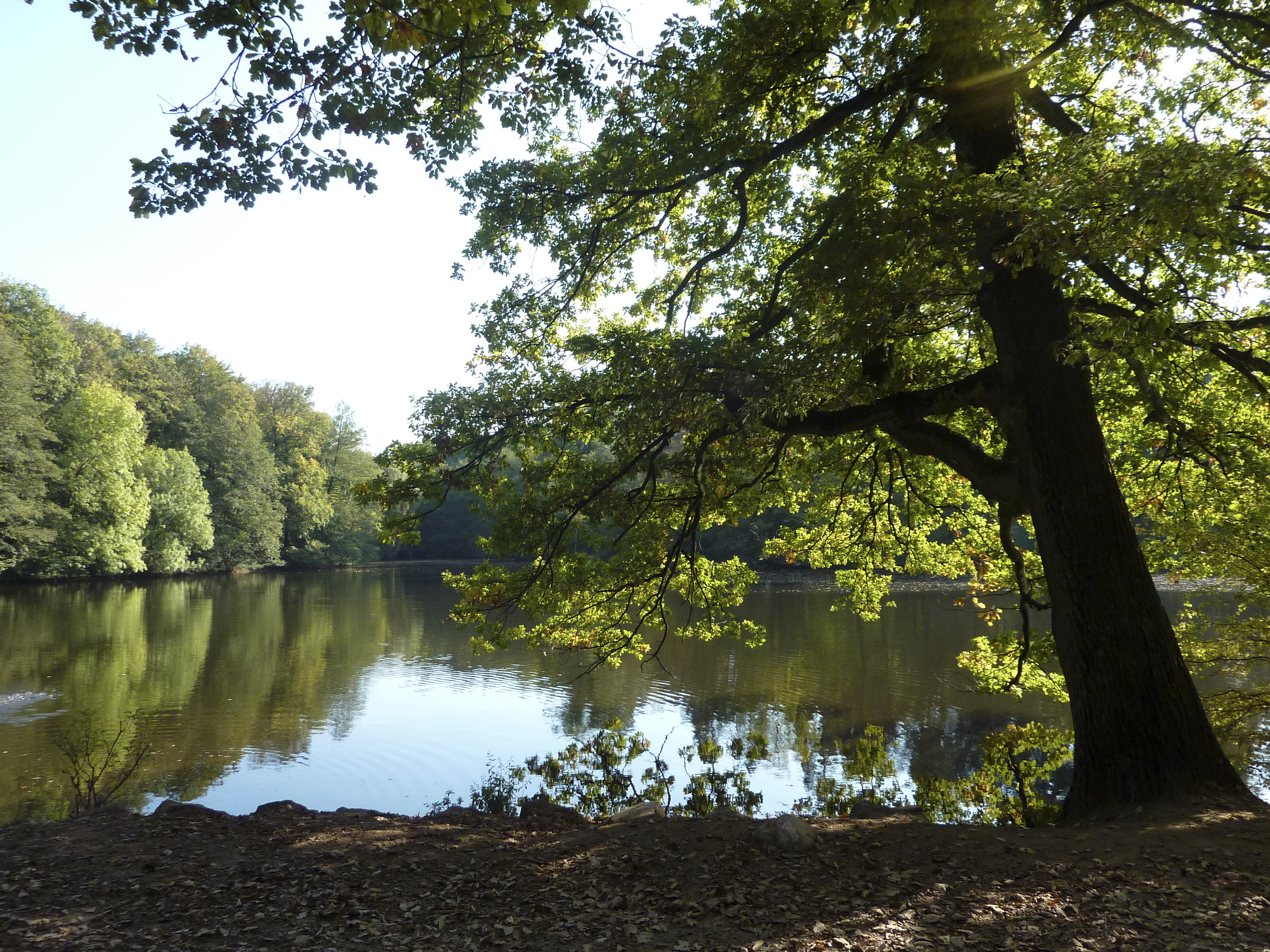
Frankfurt City Forest

With a large forest, many parks, the Main riverbanks and the two botanical gardens, Frankfurt is considered a "green city": More than 50 percent of the area within the city limits are protected green areas.

- Frankfurter Grüngürtel – The Green Belt is a ring-shaped public green space around the city. With 8,000 ha it covers a third of the administrative area. It includes the Frankfurter Stadtwald (Frankfurt City Forest, Germany's largest forest within a city), the Schwanheimer Düne (Schwanheim Dune), the Niddatal (Nidda Valley), the Niddapark, the Lohrberg (Lohr Mountain, Frankfurt's only vineyard), the Huthpark, the Enkheimer Ried (Enkheim Marsh), the Seckbacher Ried (Seckbach Marsh) and the Fechenheimer Mainbogen (a S-shaped part of the Main river in Fechenheim). The Green Belt is a protected area which means that housing is not allowed. The Green Belt was formally created in 1991 with its own constitution.
- Mainuferpark – The Mainuferpark (Main Riverbanks Park) is the common term to describe the inner-city Main riverbanks. It is an auto-free zone with large green areas that is popular with strollers and tourists, especially in the summertime, when it can become crowded. The southern riverbank, which continues further to Offenbach am Main and Hanau, offers the best skyline views. The northern riverbank ends in the west at the former Westhafen (West Harbor, a residential housing area) and is growing to the east: A former industrial-used area between the new Seat of the European Central Bank and the Osthafen (East Harbor) has become a park named Hafenpark (Harbor Park), which offers outdoor courts for basketball, soccer and a skatepark.
- Wallanlagen – The Wallanlagen (former ramparts) relate to the former ring-shaped city wall fortifications around the Altstadt and the Innenstadt district (abolished 1804–1812), now a series of parks. Building is not allowed, with a few exceptions, the most famous being the Alte Oper (built 1880) at the Opernplatz. The part between the northern Main riverbank and the Opernplatz, referred to officially as Taunusanlage and Gallusanlage, is locally known as "Central Park" (a reference to the famous park in Manhattan), because of the skyscrapers which stand on both sides.
- Nizza Park – At the juncture of the northern Main riverbank and the Wallanlagen is a famous small park called Nizza. The name of the park recalls Nice in southern France, because it is one of the warmest areas with a nearly mediterranean climate. Numerous Mediterranean flora grow there and can survive outside during the winter.
- Garten des Himmlischen Friedens – "Garden of Heavenly Peace", named after the Tiananmen Gate in Beijing, is a Chinese-styled park in the Nordend district and part of the larger Bethmannpark. It contains Chinese buildings, with building materials imported from China and built by Chinese workers in the 1980s. Hosts traditional Chinese plants and herbs.
- Niddapark – after the economic failure of a Federal Garden Show the area was opened to the public as a public park in 1990 without elaborately designed plantings. With 168 hectares, the Niddapark is the largest public park in Frankfurt. The park is popular with runners, walkers, cyclists, dog owners, families, and is used for weekend leisure activities. Apart from sports fields, one fitness trail is open to the general public.
- Other parks – the Ostpark (32 ha) and the Grüneburgpark (29 ha).

=== Botanical gardens ===
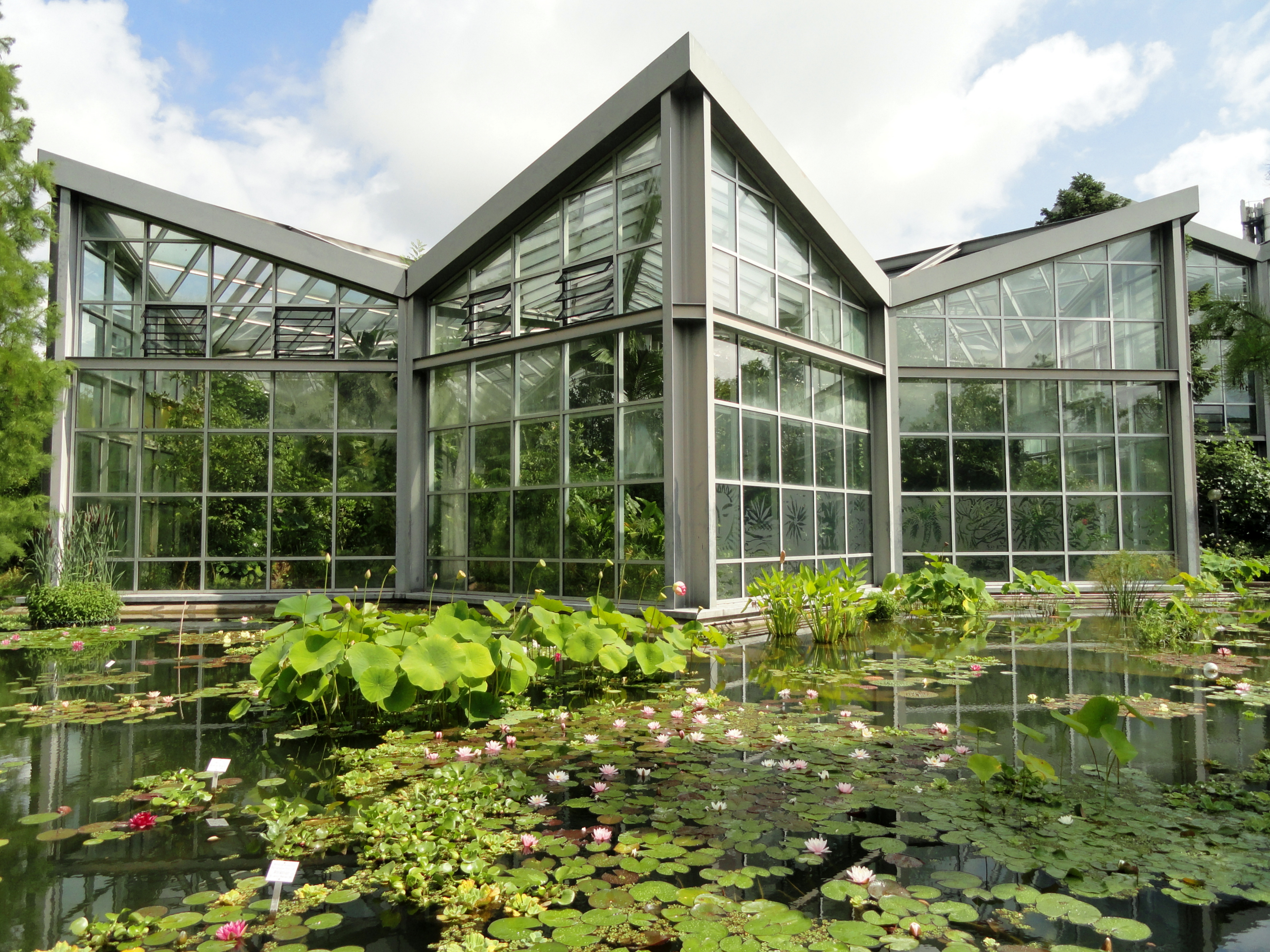
Greenhouse in the Palmengarten

Frankfurt is home to two major botanical gardens:

- Palmengarten is located in the Westend district and is Hesse's largest botanical garden, covering 22 ha (54 acres). It opened to the public in 1871. Designed by the architect Heinrich Siesmayer the botanical exhibits in free-air or in greenhouses include agave, succulents and azaleas.
- Botanischer Garten der Goethe-Universität is arboretum. It contains about 5,000 species, with special collections of Rubus (45 species) and indigenous plants of central Europe. It is organized into two major areas: The geobotanical area contains an alpine garden, arboretum, meadows, steppes, marsh, and a pond, as well as collections of plants from the Canary Islands, Caucasus, East Asia, Mediterranean, and North America and the systematic and ecological collection includes crop plants, endangered species, ornamental plants, roses, and the Neuer Senckenbergischer Arzneipflanzengarten (New Senckenberg Medicinal Plant Garden), which measures 1,200 m^{2} (13,000 ft^{2}). The Botanical Garden, Palmengarten, Grüneburgpark collectively form the largest inner-city green area.

== Culture ==
=== Museums ===
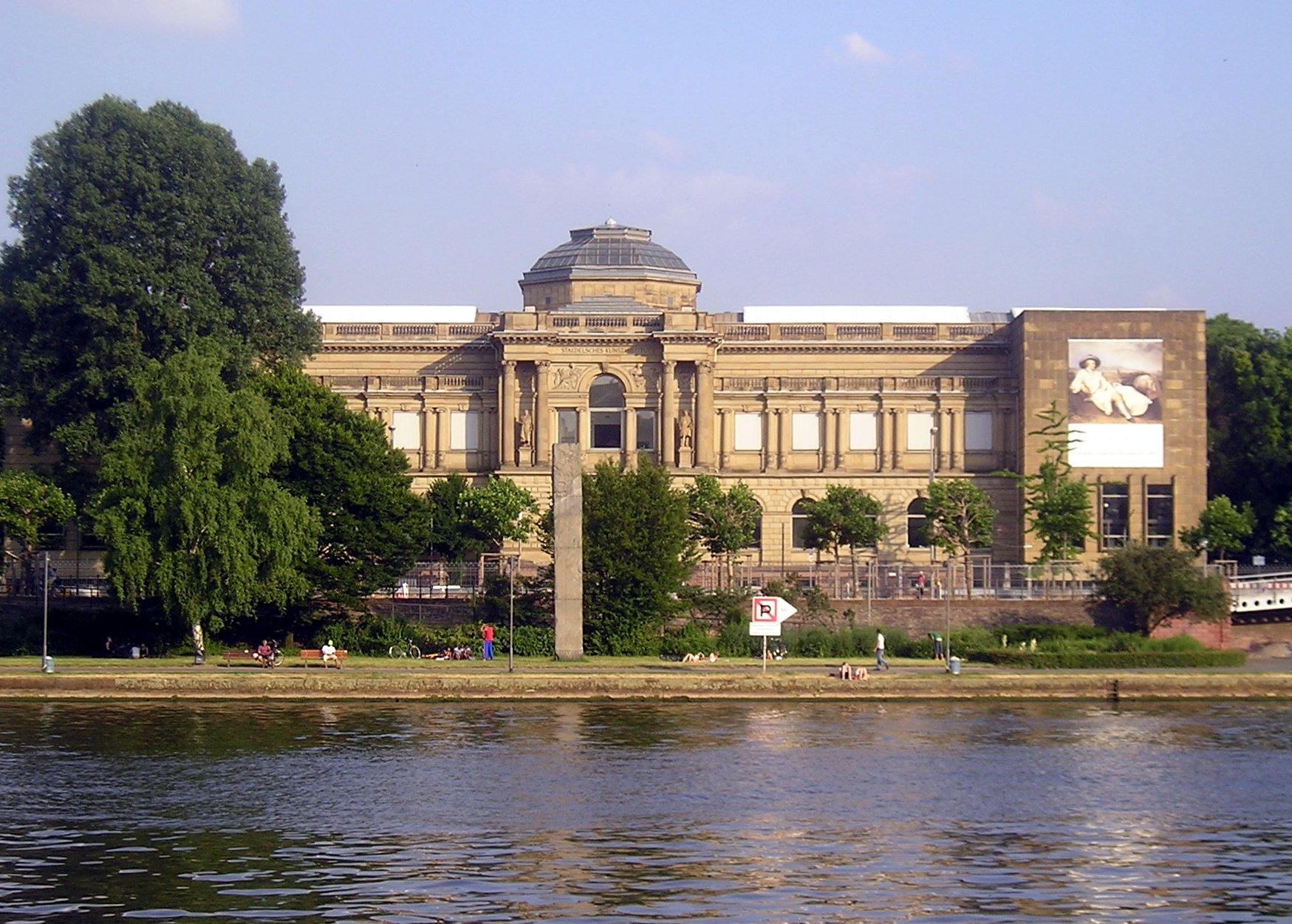
The Städel

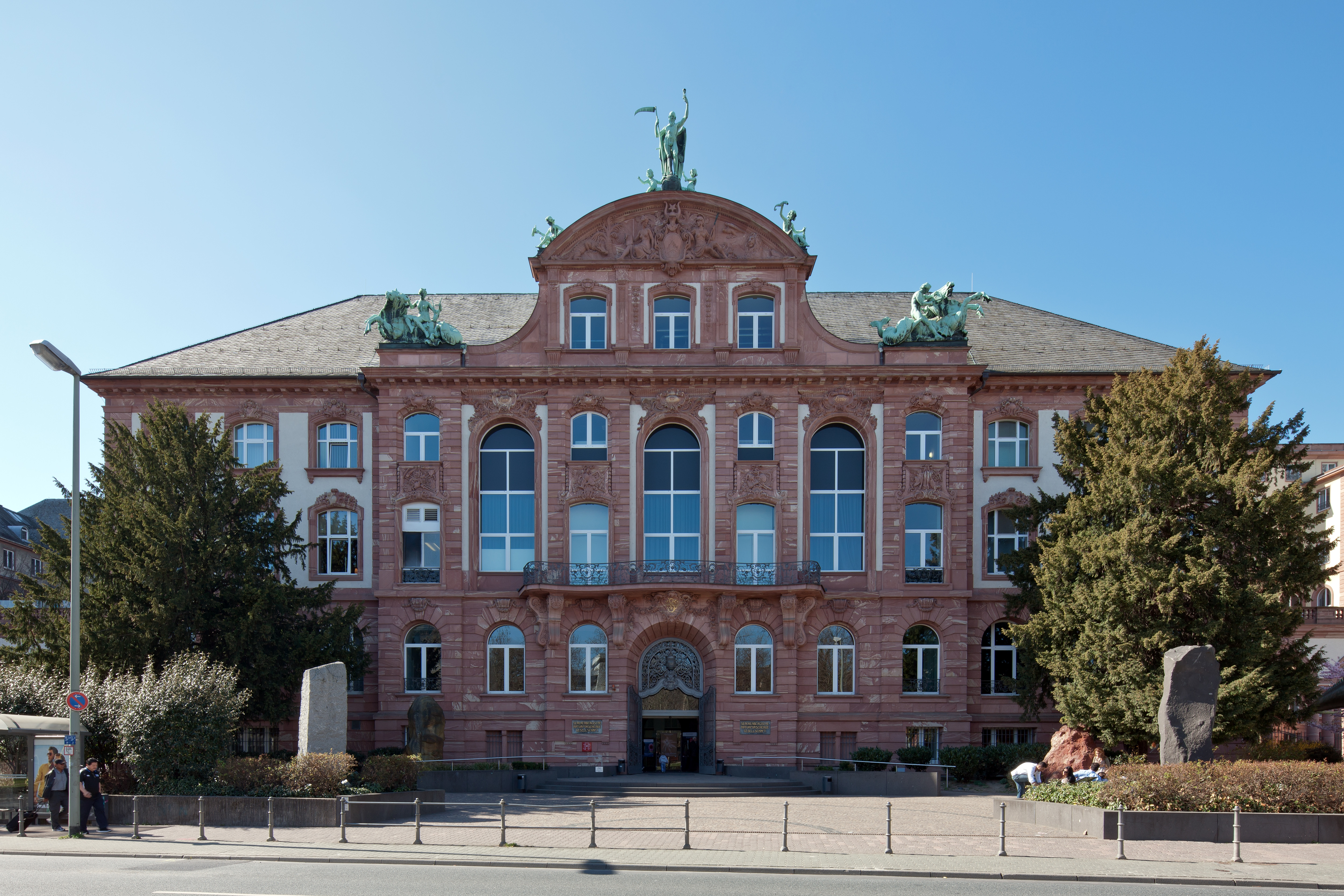
Senckenberg Natural History Museum

With more than 30 museums, Frankfurt has one of the largest variety of museums in Europe. Most museums are part of the Museumsufer, located on the front row of both sides of the Main riverbank or nearby, which was created on an initiative by cultural politician Hilmar Hoffmann.

Ten museums are located on the southern riverbank in Sachsenhausen between the Eiserner Steg and the Friedensbrücke. The street itself, Schaumainkai, is partially closed to traffic on Saturdays for Frankfurt's largest flea market.

- Deutsches Architekturmuseum (German Architecture Museum)
- German Film Museum (Deutsches Filmmuseum) (Note: Not to be confused with the Deutsche Kinemathek – Museum für Film und Fernsehen in Berlin)
- Deutsches Romantik-Museum
- Frankfurter Ikonenmuseum (Icon Museum Frankfurt)
- Liebieghaus (Museum of sculptures)
- Museum Angewandte Kunst (Museum of Applied Arts)
- Museum Giersch (Museum for Regional Art)
- Museum für Kommunikation (Museum of Communications)
- Museum der Weltkulturen (Museum of World Cultures)
- Städel, one of the most famous art museums in Germany
- Museum für elektronische Musik (Museum of Modern Electronic Music)
- Bibelhaus Erlebnis Museum (Bible House Experience Museum)

Two museums are located on the northern riverbank:

- Jüdisches Museum Frankfurt (Jewish Museum Frankfurt)
- Historisches Museum Frankfurt (Historical Museum Frankfurt)

Not directly located on the northern riverbank in the Altstadt district are:

- Museum für Moderne Kunst (Museum of Modern Art)
- Schirn Kunsthalle Frankfurt (Schirn Art Gallery Frankfurt)
- Frankfurter Kunstverein (Art Association Frankfurt)
- Museum Judengasse (Jews' Alley Museum)
- Goethe-Haus (Goethe House)
- Archäologisches Museum Frankfurt (Archaeological Museum Frankfurt)
- Caricatura Museum für Komische Kunst (Caricatura Museum of Comic Art)
- Dommuseum Frankfurt (Frankfurt Cathedral Museum)

Another important museum is located in the Westend district:

- Naturmuseum Senckenberg (Senckenberg Natural History Museum), the second-largest natural history museum in Germany

Other museums are the Dialogmuseum (Dialogue Museum) in the Ostend district, Eintracht Frankfurt Museum at Deutsche Bank Park, the Frankfurter Feldbahnmuseum (Light Railway Museum Frankfurt) in the Gallus district, the Verkehrsmuseum Frankfurt (Transport Museum Frankfurt) in the Schwanheim district, the Hammer Museum in the Bahnhofsviertel district and the Geldmuseum der Deutschen Bundesbank (Money Museum of the German Federal Bank) in the Ginnheim district. The Explora Museum+Wissenschaft+Technik (Explora Museum of Science and Engineering) in the Nordend district was closed in 2016. Most museums open around 10:00 am local time, and it is possible to comfortably visit four museums in one day, a fact many tourists take advantage of.

=== Performing arts ===
==== Music ====
Eurodance and Trance music originated in Frankfurt. In 1989 German producers Michael Münzing and Luca Anzilotti (under the pseudonyms Benito Benites and John "Virgo" Garrett III) formed the Snap! project. Snap! songs combined Rap and Soul vocals adding rhythm by using computer technology and mixing electronic sounds, bass and drums. By doing so a new genre was born: Eurodance. In the early 1990s, DJs including Sven Väth and DJ DAG (of Dance 2 Trance) first played a harder, deeper style of acid house that became popular worldwide over the next decade as Trance music. Some of the early and most influential Eurodance, Trance and Techno acts, e.g., La Bouche, Jam and Spoon, Magic Affair, Culture Beat, Snap!, Dance 2 Trance, Oliver Lieb and Hardfloor, and record labels such as Harthouse and Eye Q, were based in the city in the early 1990s.

==== Venues ====
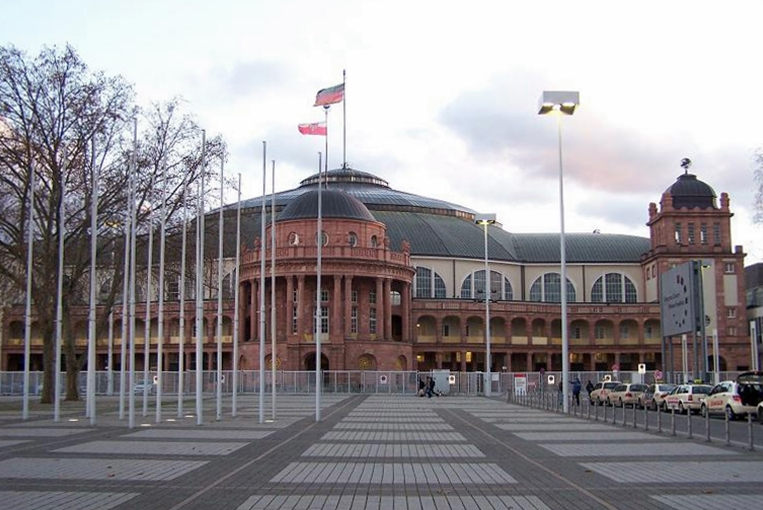
Festhalle Frankfurt

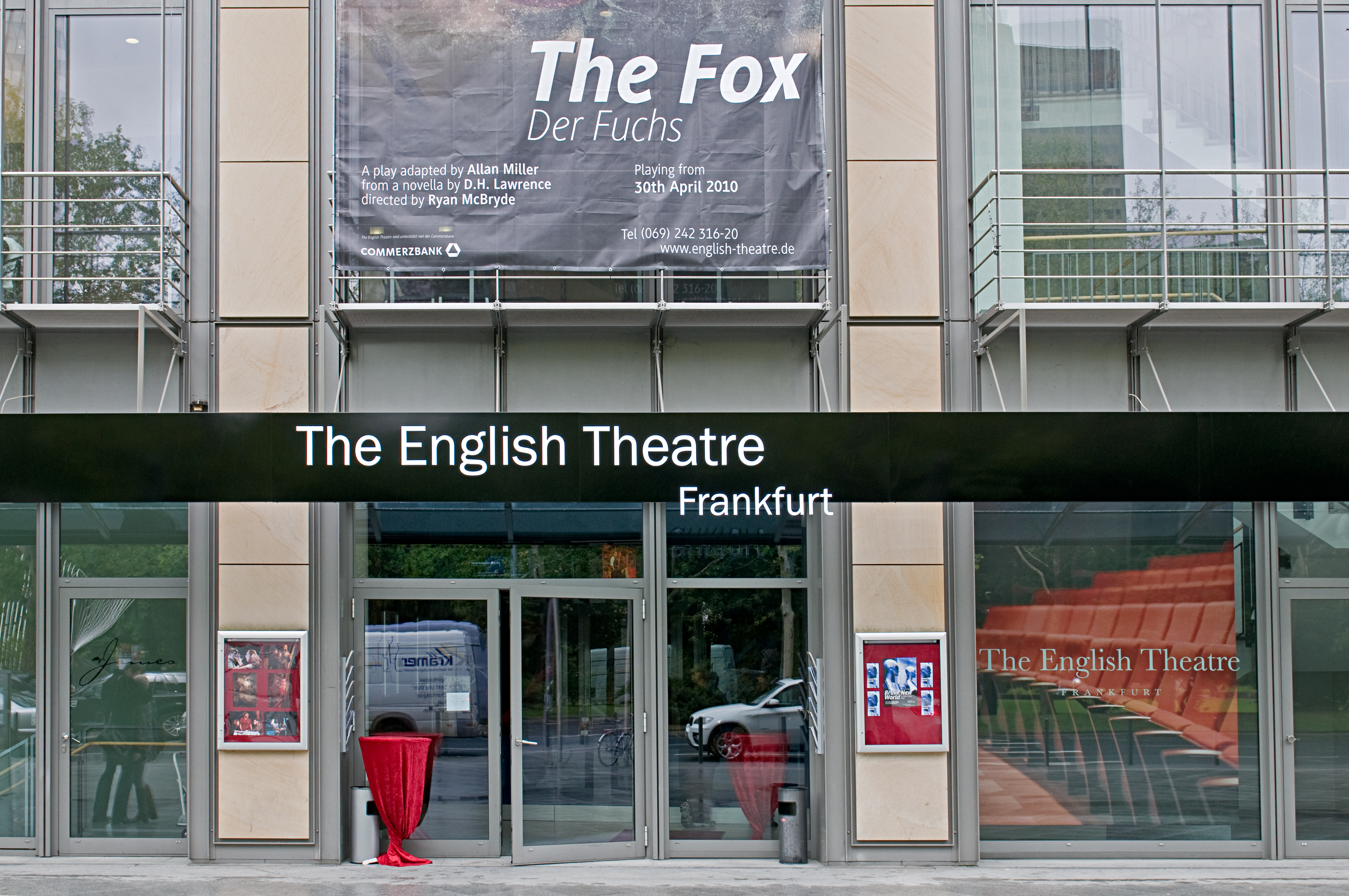
The English Theatre

- Oper Frankfurt – A leading Germany opera company and one of Europe's most important. It was elected Opera house of the year (of Germany, Austria and German-speaking Switzerland) by German magazine Opernwelt several times. Its orchestra was voted Orchestra of the year in 2009, 2010, 2011 and 2025. It is part of the Double System Städtische Bühnen Frankfurt.
- Bockenheimer Depot, venue of the Städtische Bühnen Frankfurt for operas, formerly also of the Theater am Turm, where Handke's Offending the Audience was performed in 1966
- Schauspiel Frankfurt – Theater at Willy-Brandt-Platz in the financial district, next to the Frankfurt Opera in the Double System Städtische Bühnen Frankfurt.
- Festhalle Frankfurt – Multi-purpose hall next to the Messeturm at the grounds of the Frankfurt Trade Fair. It is mostly used for concerts, exhibitions or sport events and can accommodate up to 13,500.
- Deutsche Bank Park – Frankfurt's largest sports stadium and the seventh largest in Germany. It is located in the Frankfurt City Forest near Niederrad. It is primarily used for soccer and concerts with a capacity up to 58,000. It opened in 1925 and underwent several major reconstructions. Locals still prefer to call the stadium by its traditional name, Waldstadion (Forest Stadium). Home to Eintracht Frankfurt.
- Alte Oper – A major concert hall. Venue of the Frankfurt Radio Symphony (German: hr-Sinfonieorchester), the radio orchestra of the Hessischer Rundfunk and the Frankfurter Opern- und Museumsorchester.
- hr-Sendesaal – Venue of the Frankfurt Radio Symphony.
- Jahrhunderthalle – Century Hall is a large concert and exhibition hall in Unterliederbach district. Sometimes referred to as "Jahrhunderthalle Höchst", because it was built to celebrate the 100th anniversary of the chemical company Hoechst AG in 1963.
- The English Theatre – Located on the ground floor of the Gallileo high-rise building, this is the largest English theater in continental Europe. It was established in 1979.
- Tigerpalast – Tiger Palace is a varieté near the Zeil. It was established in 1988 and houses the famous Tiger-Restaurant which was awarded a Michelin star.
- Künstlerhaus Mousonturm – House of Artists Mouson Tower has a smaller budget than traditional theaters and uses more unconventional performing methods. It is located in an old factory in the Ostend district.
- Die Schmiere – The Grease is a cabaret operational since 1950 focusing on satire.
- Die Komödie – The Comedy is a boulevard theater near downtown Frankfurt's Willy-Brandt-Platz.

=== Foreign culture ===
- Instituto Cervantes – Named after Miguel de Cervantes, one of the most important Spanish authors, this is the world's largest organization for promoting the study and teaching of Spanish language and culture. 54 such Centros Cervantes across the world offer Spanish language and history courses. The Frankfurt branch was officially opened in September 2008 by Felipe, Prince of Asturias and his wife Letizia, Princess of Asturias. It is located in the so-called Amerika-Haus.
- Institut Français – A French public industrial and commercial organization (EPIC), started in 1907 by the Ministry of Foreign Affairs for promoting French, francophone as well as local cultures around the world. The French Institute works closely with the French cultural network abroad consisting of more than 150 branches and nearly 1,000 branches of the Alliance française around the world.
- Istituto Italiano di Cultura – A worldwide non-profit organization created by the Italian government. It promotes Italian culture and is involved in the teaching of the Italian language; there are 83 Italian Cultural Institutes throughout major cities around the world.
- Confucius Institute – A non-profit public educational organization affiliated with the Ministry of Education of the People's Republic of China, whose aim is to promote Chinese language and culture, support local Chinese teaching internationally, and facilitate cultural exchanges. There are more than 480 Confucius Institutes worldwide.
- Central and Eastern European Online Library – CEEOL is an online archive providing access to full-text articles from humanities and social science scholarly journals on Central, Eastern and South-Eastern European topics. Subject areas include anthropology, culture and society, economy, gender studies, history, Judaic studies, fine arts, literature, linguistics, political sciences and social sciences, philosophy and religion. CEEOL is operated by Questa.Soft GmbH.

=== Festivals ===
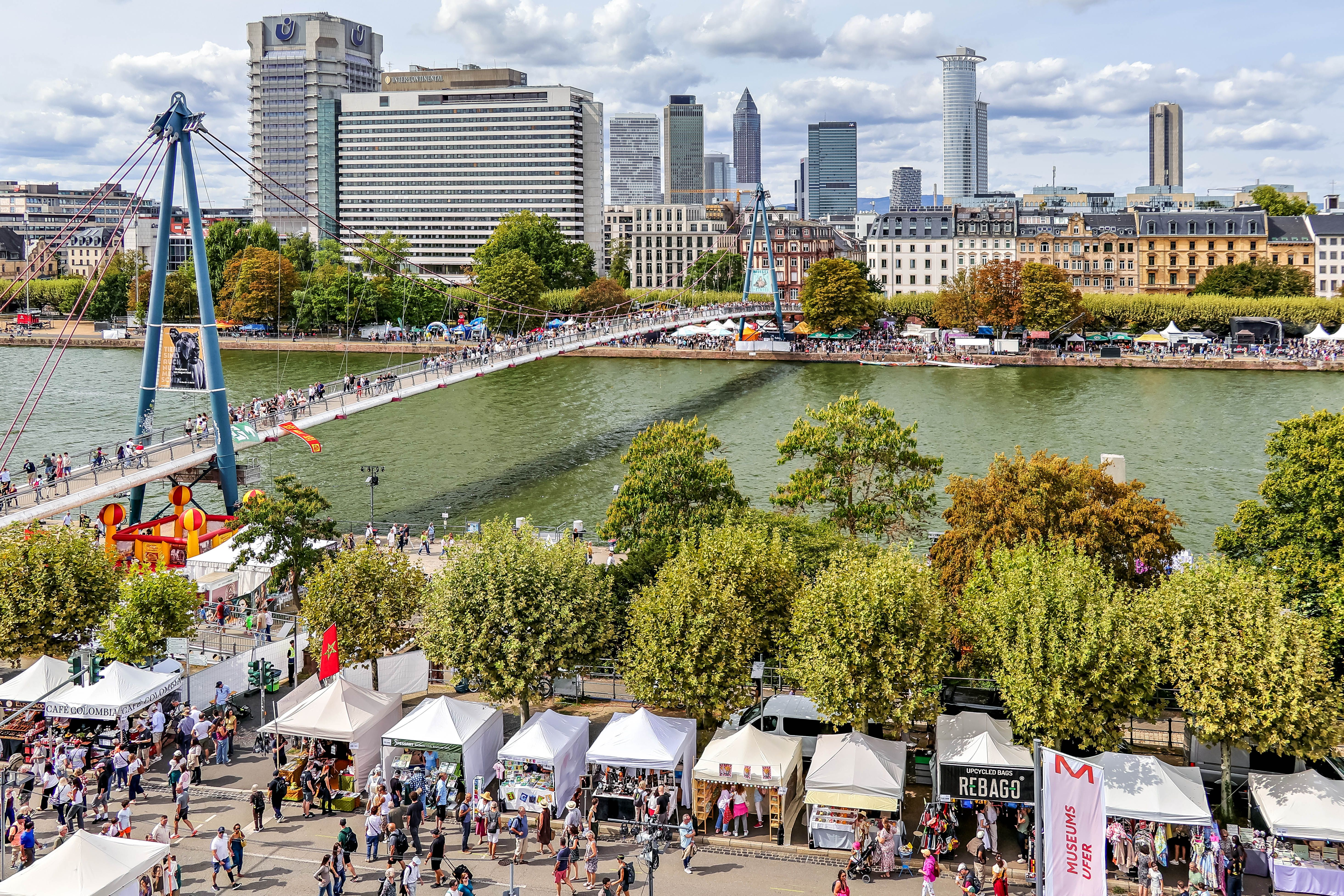
The Museumsuferfest in 2026

- Museumsuferfest – Museums Riverbank Festival is one of Germany's biggest cultural festivals, attracting more than 3 million visitors over three days at the end of August along the Main riverbank downtown. The 20 museums there open far into the night. It offers live music, dance shows, booths for crafts, jewelry, clothes and food stands from around the world.

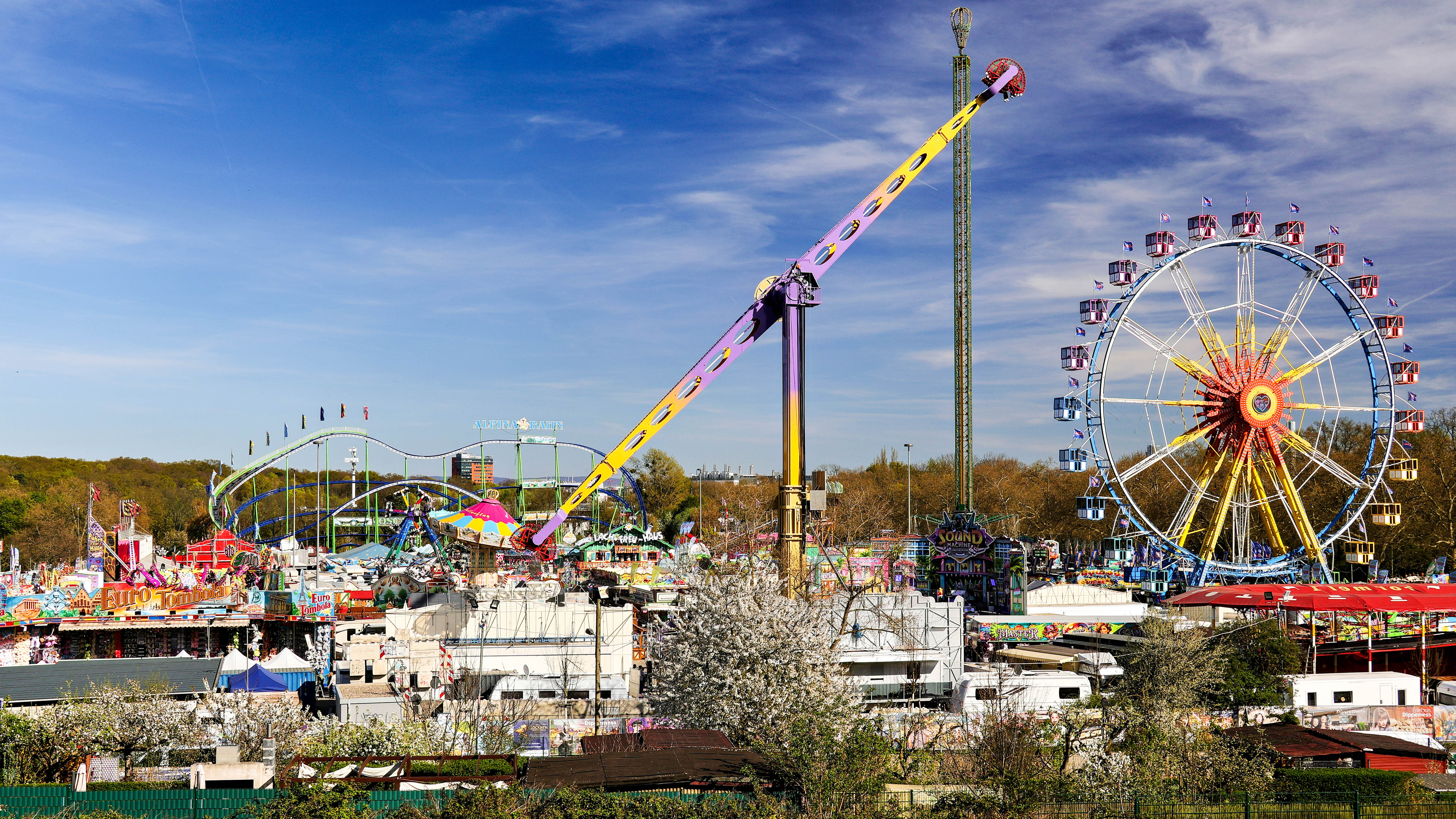
Dippemess in Spring 2026

- Dippemess – Frankfurt's oldest folk festival is the Festival of Stoneware, which takes place semi-annually around Easter and the end of September in the eastern area. "Dippe" is a regional Hessian dialect word meaning "pot" or "jar" which would not be understood in most other German regions. Mentioned for the first time in the 14th century as an annual marketplace it is now more of an amusement park. The name of the festival derives from its original purpose when it was a fair where traditionally crafted jars, pots and other stoneware were on offer.
- Luminale — The "festival of light" has taken place biannually since 2000, parallel to the Light + building exhibition at the trade fair. Many buildings are specially lit for the event. In 2008, more than 220 light installations could be seen, attracting 100,000 visitors.

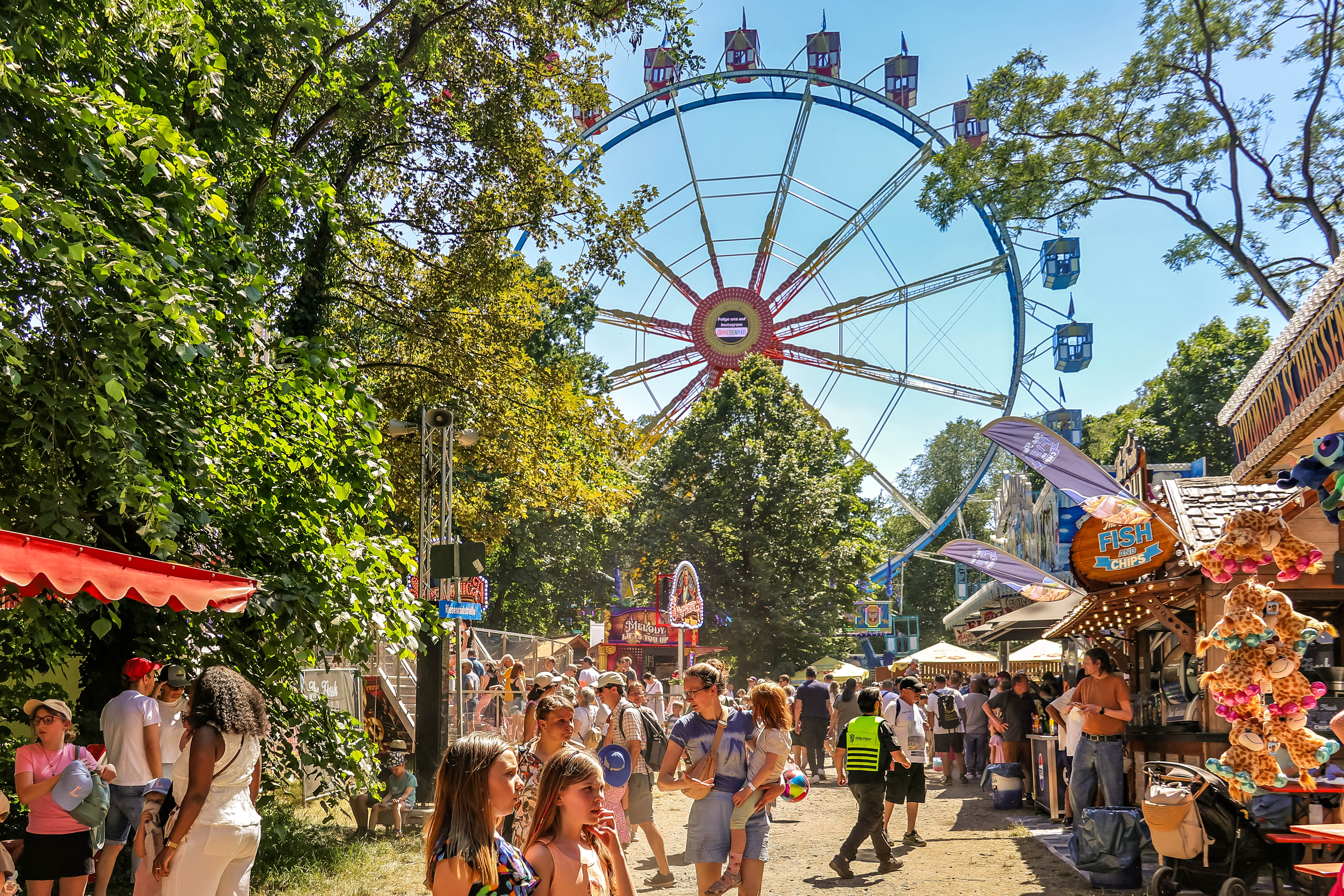
Wäldchestag in 2026

- Wäldchestag – Day of the forest is known as a regional holiday because until the 1990s it was common that Frankfurt's shops were closed on this day. The festival takes place over four days after Pentecost with the formal Wäldchestag on Tuesday. Its unique location is in the Frankfurt City Forest, south-west of downtown in Niederrad. "Wäldches" is a regional dialect of the German word "Wäldchen", meaning "small forest".
- Nacht der Museen – Night of the museums takes place every year in April or May. 50 museums in Frankfurt and in the neighboring city of Offenbach am Main are open until 2:00 am surrounded by special music events, dance performances, readings and guided tours. A free shuttle operates between the museums. In 2010, approximately 40,000 visitors attended.
- Nacht der Clubs – Night of the clubs is an event similar to Nacht der Museen: On one night as many as 20 clubs can be visited with a single ticket for €12. Usually, club-door policies are loosened to attract new customers. A free shuttle runs between the clubs. 15,000 people participated in 2008.
- Wolkenkratzer Festival — The Skyscraper Festival is unique in Germany. It takes place irregularly, lately in May 2013, and attracted around 1.2 million visitors. For two days most skyscrapers are open to the public. Sky-divers, base jumpers, fireworks and laser shows are extra attractions.

=== Nightlife ===
Frankfurt offers a variety of restaurants, bars, pubs and clubs. Clubs concentrate in and around downtownand in the Ostend district, mainly close to Hanauer Landstraße. Restaurants, bars and pubs concentrate in Sachsenhausen, Nordend, Bornheim and Bockenheim.

In electronic music, Frankfurt was a pioneering city in the late 1980s and early 1990s, with renowned DJs including Sven Väth, Marc Trauner, Scot Project and Kai Tracid. One of the main venues of the early Trance music sound was the Omen nightclub from 1988 to 1998. Another popular disco club of the 1980s–1990s and a hotspot for Techno/Trance music was the Dorian Gray, which was located within Terminal 1 at Frankfurt Airport from 1978 to 2000. Further popular venues were the U60311 (1998–2012) and the Coocoon Club in Fechenheim (2004–2012). Notable live music venues of the past include the Sinkkasten Arts Club (1971–2011) and the King Kamehameha Club (1999–2013).

Among the most popular active rock and pop concert venues is the Batschkapp in Seckbach, which opened in 1976 as a center for autonomous and left-wing counterculture.

=== Domestic culture ===
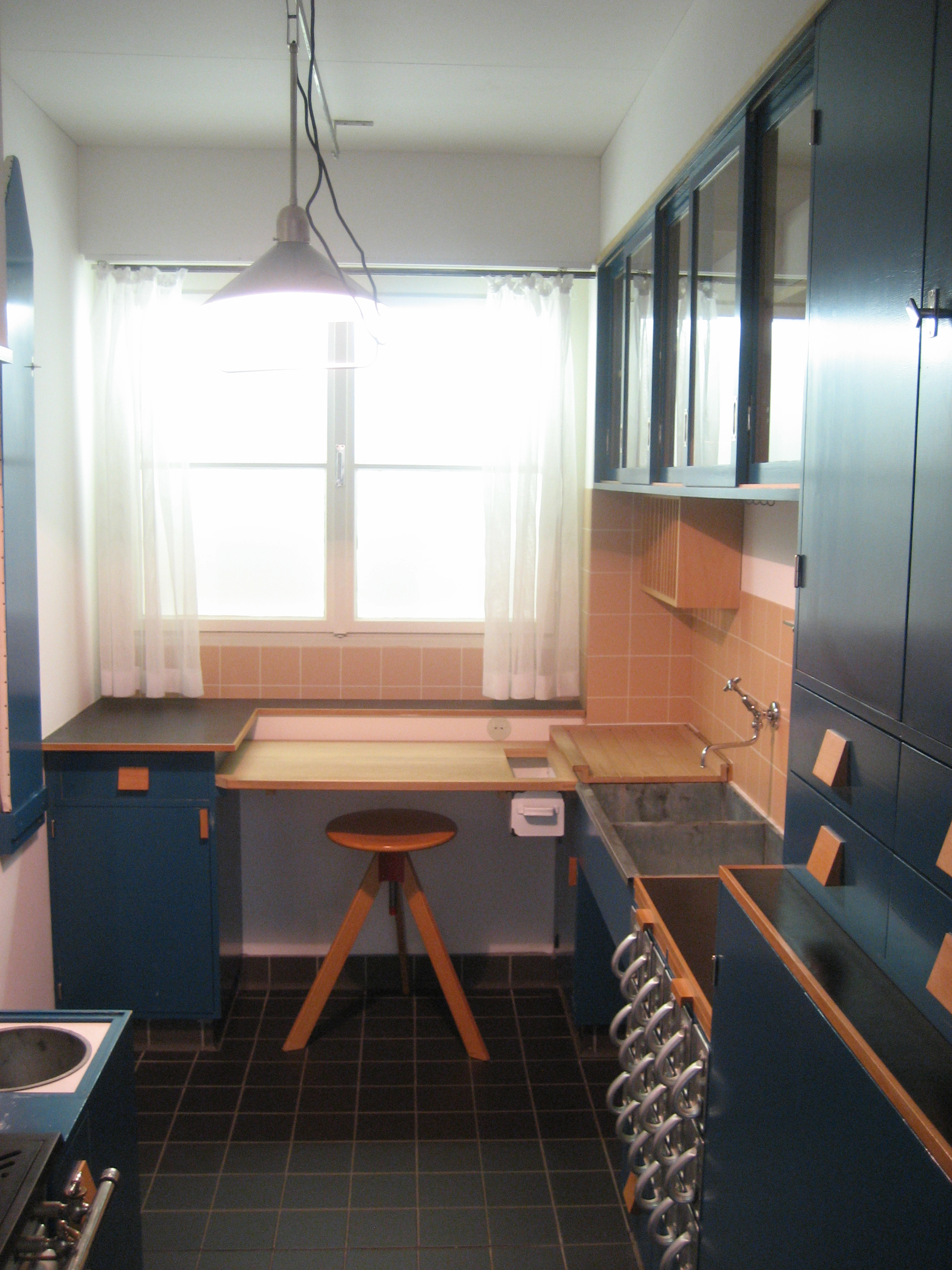
A Frankfurt kitchen in the version of 1926 in an Austrian museum

- Frankfurt kitchen – Designed originally in 1926 by Margarete Schütte-Lihotzky this kitchen is now recognized as one of the most influential designs in history and was mass produced. In 1920s Weimar republic Germany 10,000 modules of the Frankfurt kitchen were produced in Frankfurt.
- Frankfurt Cabinet – The Baroque Frankfurt-style cupboards were used to store the family linen, one of them by Goethe's father, who took one cupboard to Rome. The most luxurious versions have wave-shaped parts, some are made of solid cherry wood inlaid with plumwood.

=== Culinary specialties ===
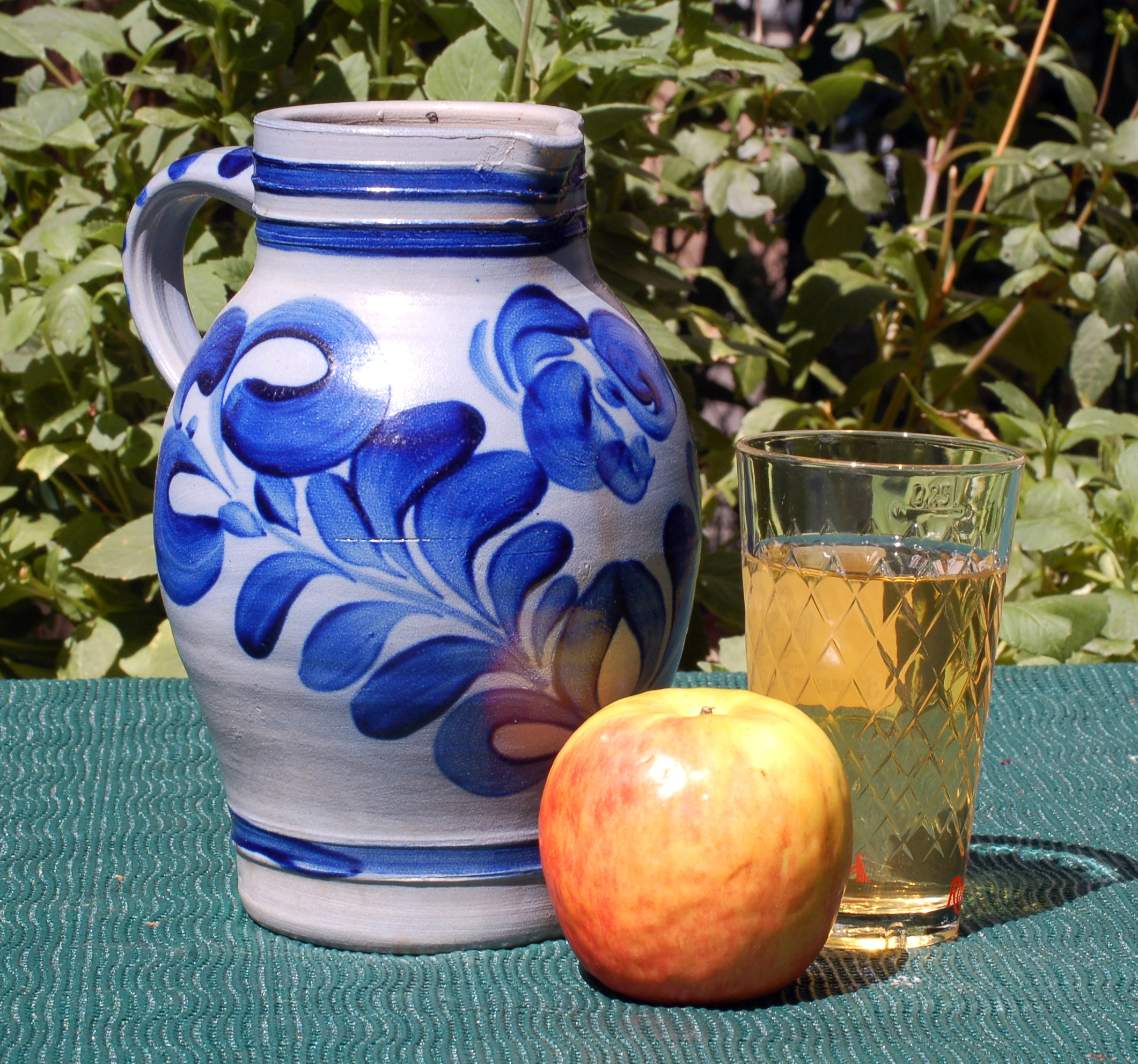
"Bembel" (jug) and "Geripptes" (glass)

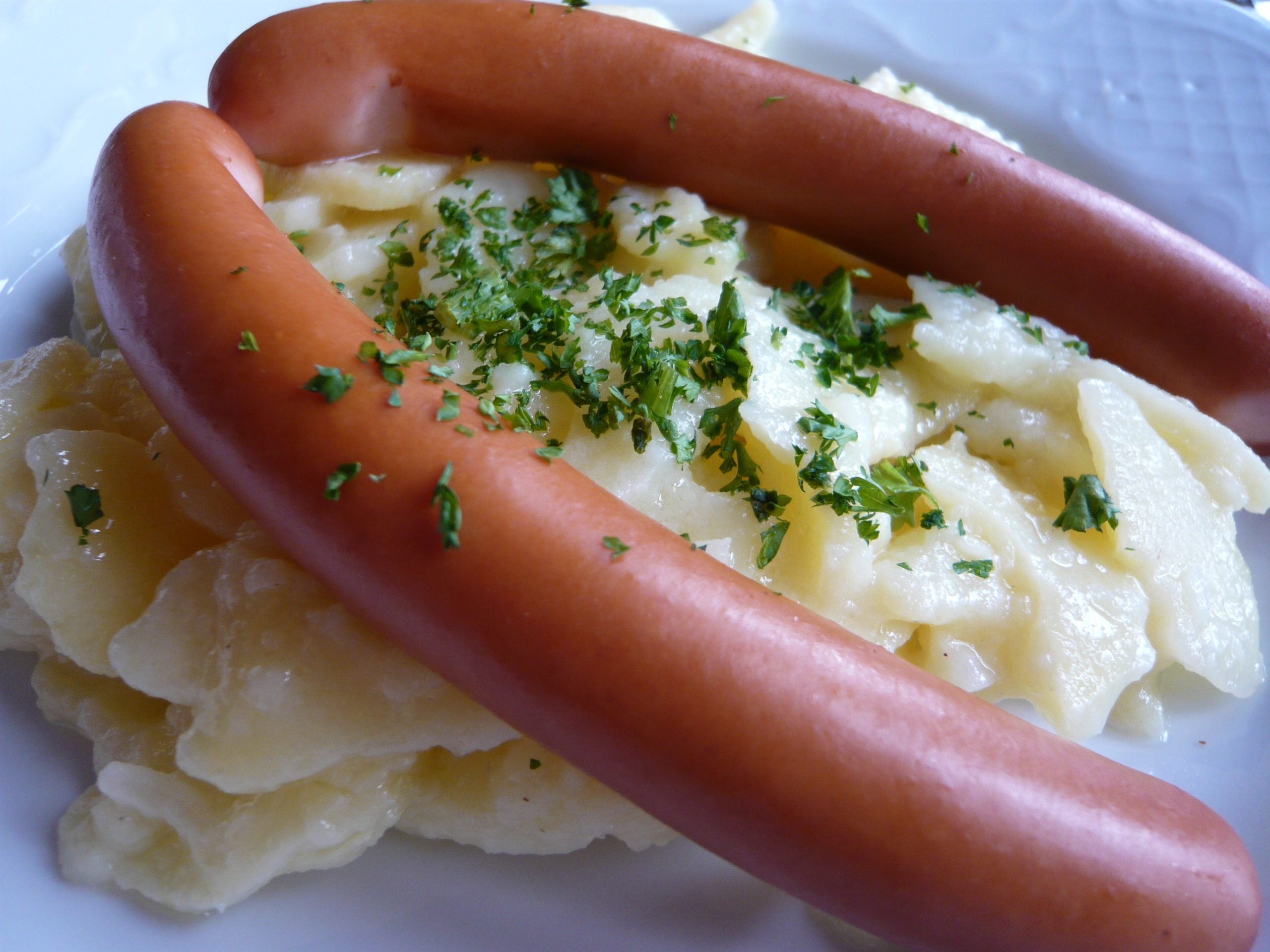
Original Frankfurter Würstchen served with potato salad

- Apfelwein – Apple wine or hard cider is regionally known as "Ebbelwoi", "Äppler" or "Stöffsche". It has an alcohol content of 5.5%–7% and a tart, sour taste. It is traditionally served in a glass, typically decorated with lozenges, called "Geripptes", a full glass is then called "Schoppen". Apfelwein is also available in a stoneware jar locally known as "Bembel". A group normally orders a "Bembel" and shares the contents. Apfelwein can be ordered as "sauergespritzer", which is apfelwein blended with 30% mineral water or as "süssgespritzer", which is Apfelwein blended with lemon soda, orange soda or fresh-pressed apple juice (lemon soda being the most common). Most of the pubs which serve Apfelwein are located in Sachsenhausen, which is therefore known as "Ebbelwoi district". Due to its national drink Frankfurt is sometimes called "Big Ebbel" (pronunciation with Hessian dialect), an homage to Big Apple, the famous nickname of New York City.
- Grüne Soße – Green sauce is a sauce made with hard-boiled eggs, oil, vinegar, salt and a generous amount of seven fresh herbs, namely borage, sorrel, garden cress, chervil, chives, parsley and salad burnet. Variants, often due to seasonal availability include dill, lovage, lemon balm and spinach. Original green sauce Frankfurt-style is made of herbs that were gathered only on fields within the city limits.
- Frankfurter Würstchen – "short Frankfurter" is a small sausage made of smoked pork. They are similar to hot dogs. The name Frankfurter Würstchen has been trademarked since 1860.
- Frankfurter Rindswurst – Sausage made of pure beef.
- Frankfurter Rippchen – Also known as Rippchen mit Kraut, this is a traditional dish which consists of cured pork cutlets, slowly heated in sauerkraut or meat broth, and usually served with sauerkraut, mashed potatoes and yellow mustard.
- Handkäs mit Musik – German regional sour milk cheese (similar to Harzer) and a culinary specialty in the Rhine Main Region. The traditional way of producing it is by hand. When it is topped with chopped onions it becomes "Handkäs mit Musik" (with music) because the onions are supposed to stimulate flatulence.
- Frankfurter Kranz – Cake speciality believed to originate from Frankfurt.
- Bethmännchen – "A little Bethmann" is a pastry made from marzipan with almond, powdered sugar, rosewater, flour, and egg. It is usually baked for Christmas.

== Quality of life ==
In a 2001 ranking by the University of Liverpool, Frankfurt was rated the richest city in Europe by GDP per capita, followed by Karlsruhe, Paris and Munich.

Frankfurt was voted the seventh in the Mercer Quality of Living Survey by the Mercer Quality of Living Survey (2012), seventh in the Mercer Quality of Living Survey (2010) and 18th at the Economist's World's Most Liveable Cities Survey (2011). According to an annual citizen survey (2010), arranged by the city council, 66 percent inhabitants are satisfied or highly satisfied with the city, while only 6 percent said that they are dissatisfied. Compared to the 1993's survey the number of satisfied inhabitants has grown about 22 percent while the number of dissatisfied inhabitants was reduced by 8 percent. 84 percent of the inhabitants like to live in Frankfurt, 13 percent would rather choose to live somewhere else. 37 percent are satisfied with the public safety (1993: only 9 percent), 22 percent are dissatisfied (1993: 64 percent).

Frankfurt consistently has the highest levels of crime per 100,000 inhabitants in Germany (15.976 crimes per annum in 2008) and is therefore dubbed the German "crime capital". However, this statistic is often criticized because it ignores major factors: It is calculated based on the administrative 680,000-inhabitant figure while the urban area has 2.5 M inhabitants and on weekdays adds another million people (not counting the 53 million passengers passing through the airport each year). The rate for personal safety-relevant crimes such as murder, manslaughter, rape or bodily harm, is 3.4 percent, placing Frankfurt twelfth in the ranking (related to the official 680,000-inhabitant figure) or number 21 (related to the one-million-figure). In 2018, the state of Hesse, where Frankfurt is located, was ranked the third-safest state in Germany.

== Transport ==
=== Airports ===
==== Frankfurt Airport ====
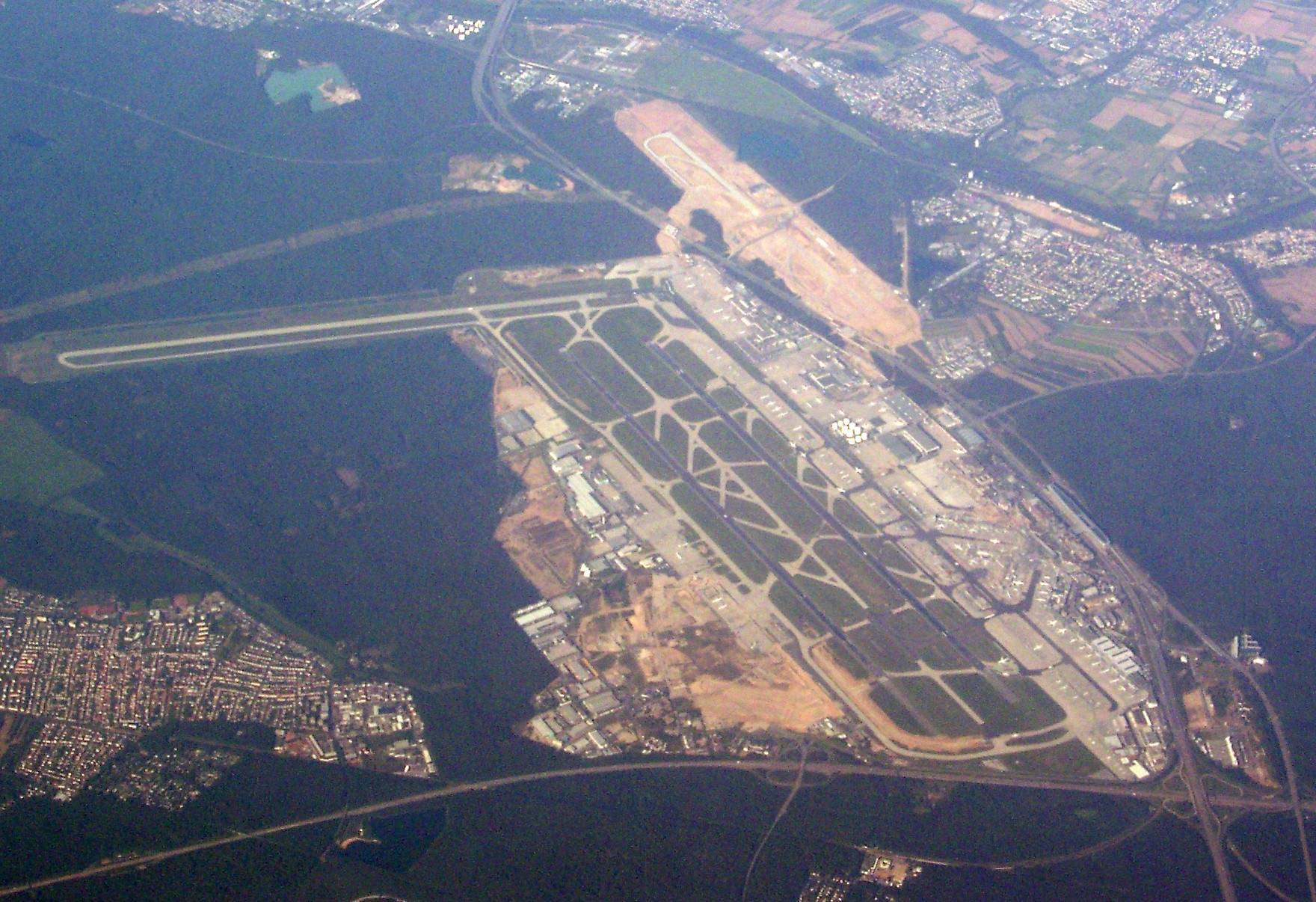
Frankfurt Airport (with the fourth runway under construction in 2010) and the Frankfurter Kreuz (lower right corner)

The city can be accessed from around the world via Frankfurt Airport (Flughafen Frankfurt am Main) located 12 km (7 mi) southwest of downtown. The airport has four runways and serves 265 nonstop destinations. Run by transport company Fraport it ranks among the world's busiest airports by passenger traffic and is the busiest airport by cargo traffic in Europe. The airport also serves as a hub for Condor and as the main hub for German flag carrier Lufthansa. It is the busiest airport in Europe in terms of cargo traffic, and the fourth busiest in Europe in terms of passenger traffic behind London Heathrow Airport, Paris Charles de Gaulle Airport and Amsterdam Airport Schiphol. Passenger traffic at Frankfurt Airport in 2018 was 69,510,269 passengers.

A third terminal is being constructed (planned to open in 2026). The third terminal will increase the capacity of the airport to more than 90 million passengers per year.

The airport can be reached by car or bus and has two railway stations, one for regional and one for long-distance traffic. The S-Bahn lines S8 and S9 (direction Offenbach Ost or Hanau Hbf) departing at the regional station take 10–15 minutes from the airport to Frankfurt Central Station and onwards to Hauptwache station downtown. The IC and ICE trains departing at the long-distance station take 10 minutes to Frankfurt Central Station.

==== Frankfurt Hahn Airport ====
Despite the name, Frankfurt Hahn Airport (Flughafen Frankfurt-Hahn) is situated approximately 120 km (75 mi) from the city in Lautzenhausen (Rhineland-Palatinate). Hahn Airport is a major base for low-cost carrier Ryanair. This airport can only be reached by car or bus. An hourly bus service runs from Frankfurt Central Station, taking just over 2 hours. Passenger traffic at Hahn Airport in 2010 was 3.5 million.

==== Frankfurt Egelsbach Airport ====
Frankfurt Egelsbach Airport (Flugplatz Frankfurt-Egelsbach) is a busy general aviation airport located south-east of Frankfurt Airport, near Egelsbach.

=== Roads ===
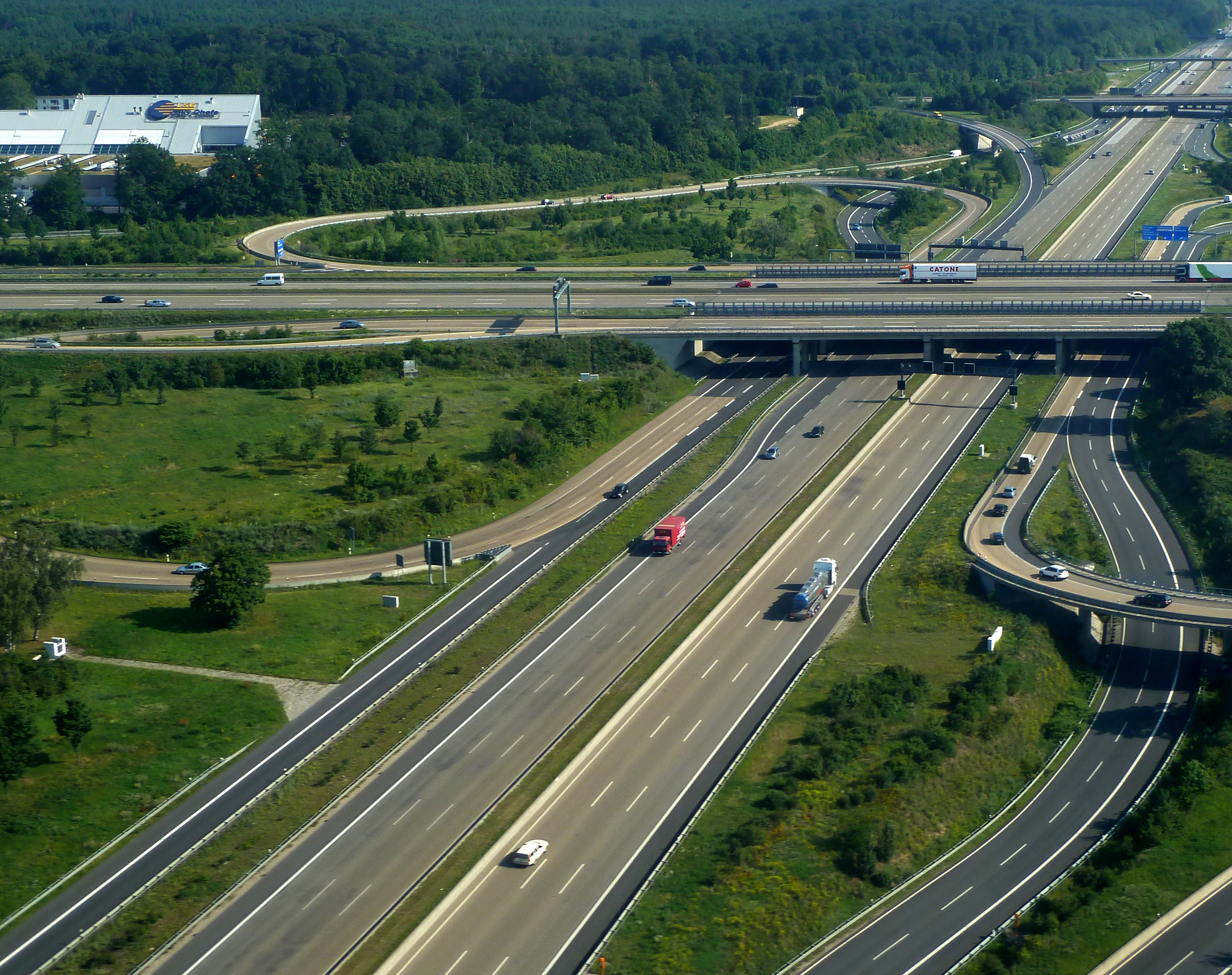
Frankfurter Kreuz

Frankfurt is a traffic hub for the German motorway (Autobahn) system. The Frankfurter Kreuz is an Autobahn interchange close to the airport, where the Bundesautobahn 3 (A3), Cologne to Würzburg, and the Bundesautobahn 5 (A5), Basel to Hanover, meet. With approximately 320,000 cars passing through it every day, it is Europe's most heavily used interchange. The Bundesautobahn 66 (A66) connects Frankfurt with Wiesbaden in the west and Fulda in the east. The Bundesautobahn 661 (A661) is mainly a commuter motorway that starts in the south (Egelsbach), runs through the eastern part and ends in the north (Oberursel). The Bundesautobahn 648 (A648) is a very short motorway in the western part which primarily serves as a fast connection between the A 66 and the Frankfurt Trade Fair. The A5 in the west, the A3 in the south and the A661 in the northeast form a ring road around the inner city districts and define a Low-emission zone (Umweltzone; established in 2008), meaning that vehicles have to meet certain emission criteria to enter the zone.

The streets of central Frankfurt are usually congested with cars during rush hour. Some areas, especially around the shopping streets Zeil, Goethestraße and Freßgass, are pedestrian-only streets.

=== Railway stations ===
==== Frankfurt Central Station ====
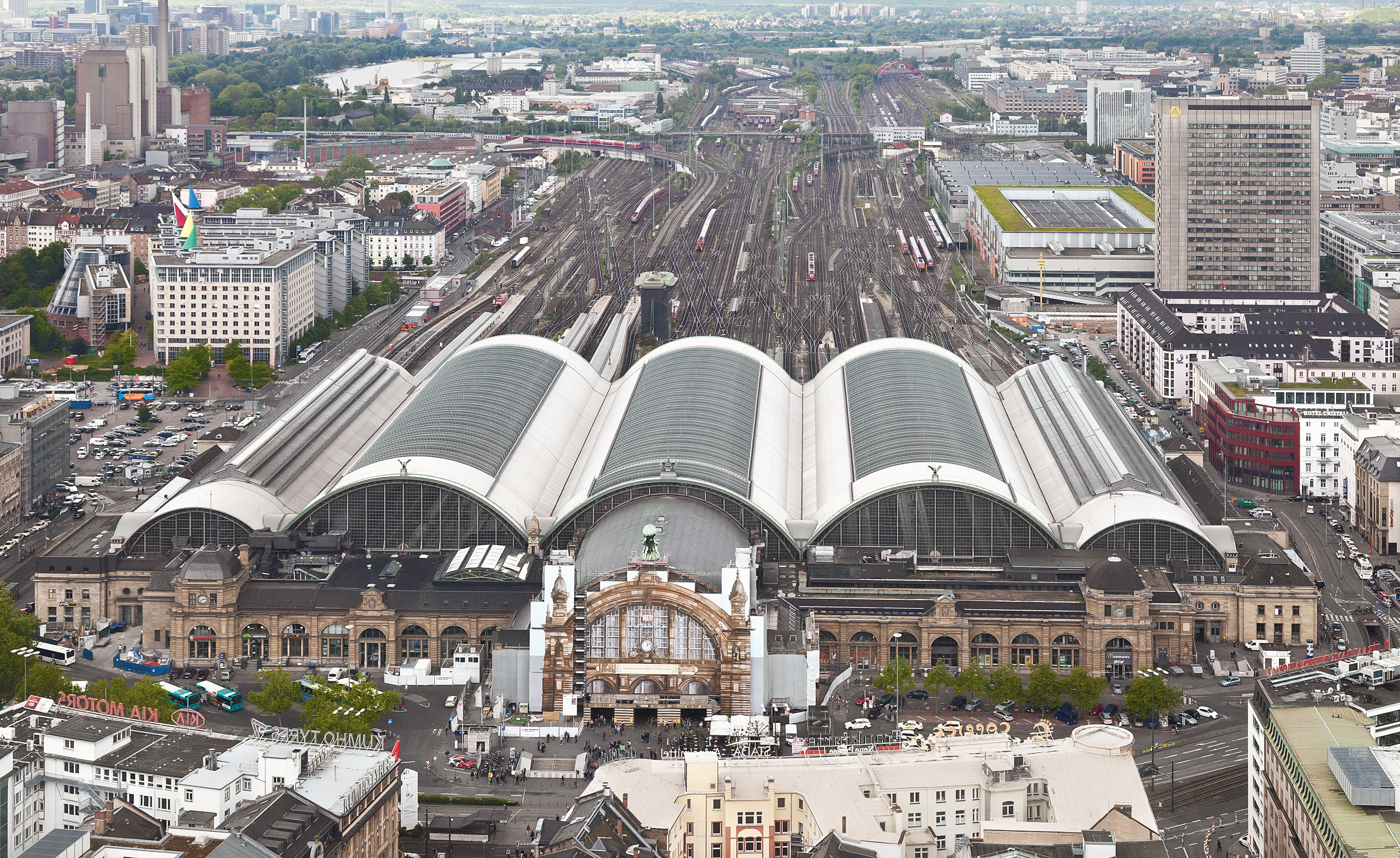
Frankfurt Central Station

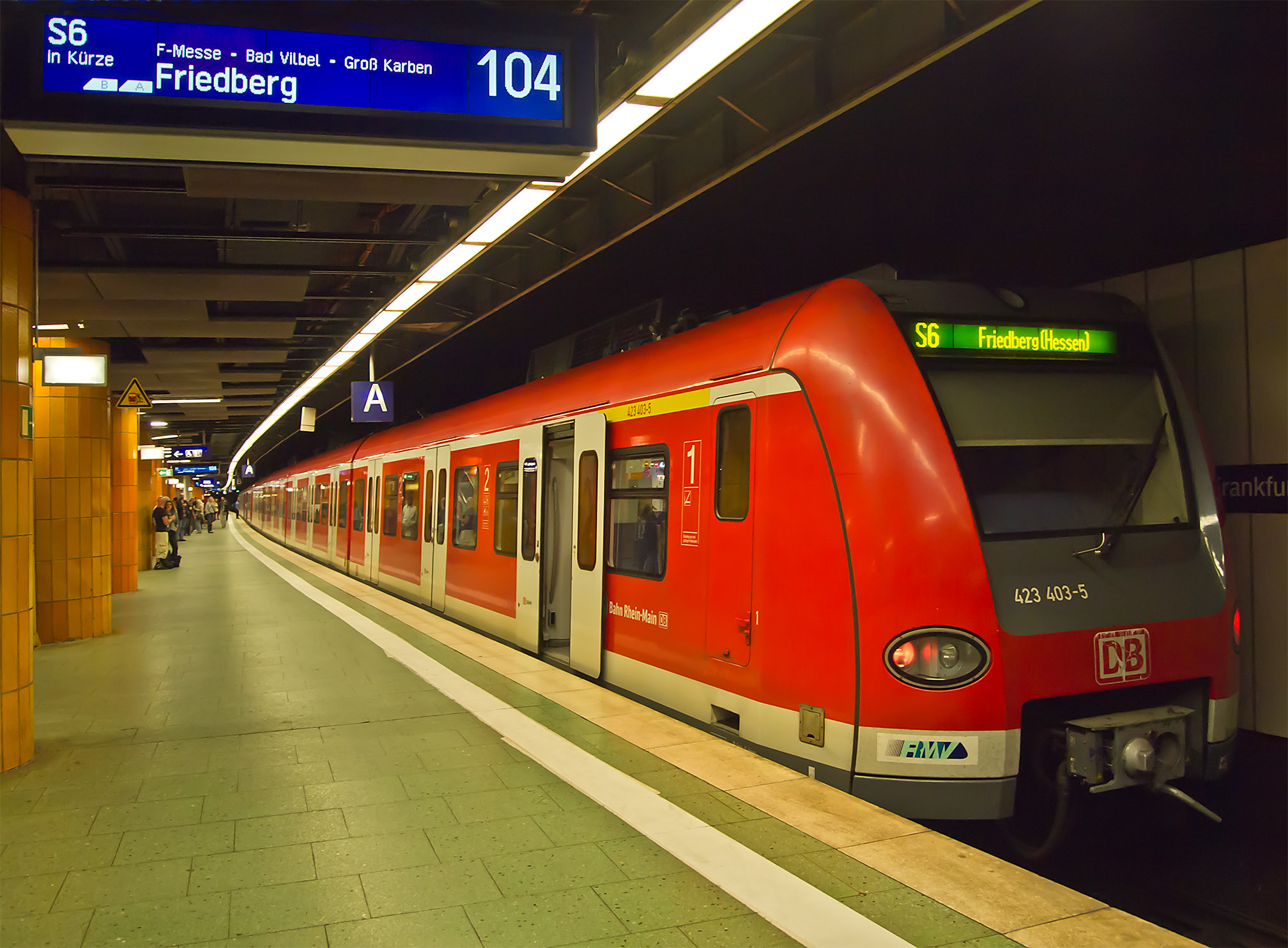
S-Bahn at Central Station (underground)

Frankfurt Hauptbahnhof (often abbreviated as Frankfurt (Main) Hbf or F-Hbf) is the largest railway station in Germany by railway traffic. By daily passenger volume, it ranks second (493,000 each) after Hamburg Central Station (550,000). It is located between the Gallus, the Gutleutviertel and the Bahnhofsviertel district, not far away from the trade fair and the financial district. It serves as a major hub for long-distance trains (InterCity, ICE) and regional trains as well as for Frankfurt's public transport system. It is a stop for most of ICE high-speed lines, making it Germany's most important ICE station. ICE Trains to London via the Channel Tunnel were planned for 2013. All Rhine-Main S-Bahn lines, two U-Bahn lines (U4, U5), several tram and bus lines stop there. Regional and local trains are integrated in the Public transport system Rhein-Main-Verkehrsverbund (RMV), the second-largest integrated public transport system in the world, after Verkehrsverbund Berlin-Brandenburg.

==== Frankfurt Airport stations ====
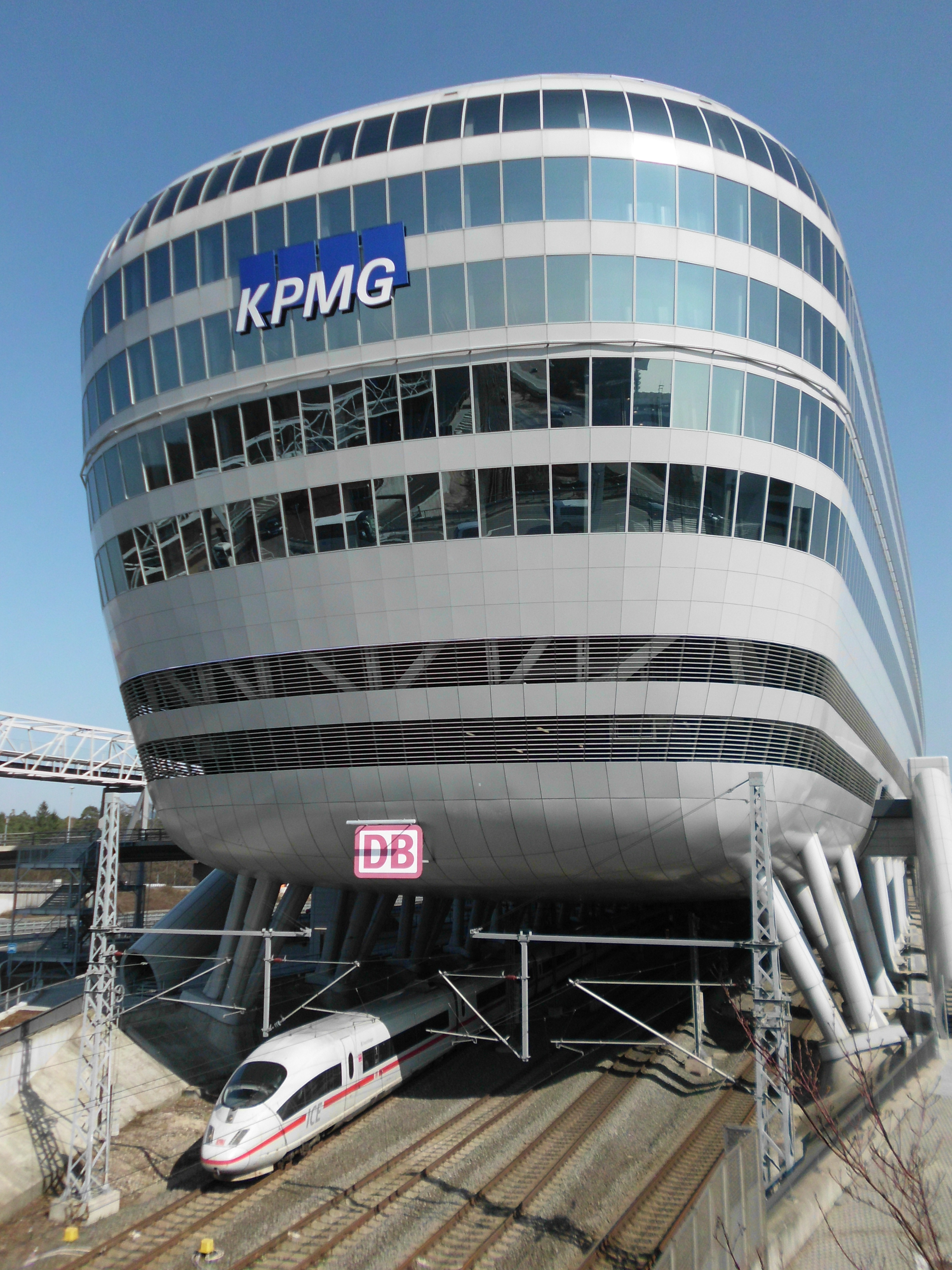
ICE 3 departing westward from Frankfurt Airport long-distance station underneath The Squaire

Frankfurt Airport can be accessed by two railway stations: Frankfurt Airport long-distance station (Frankfurt Flughafen Fernbahnhof) is only for long-distance traffic and connects the airport to the main rail network, with most of the ICE services using the Cologne-Frankfurt high-speed rail line. The long-distance station is located outside the actual airport ground but has a connecting bridge for pedestrians to Terminal 1, concourse B. Frankfurt Airport regional station (Frankfurt Flughafen Regionalbahnhof) is for local S-Bahn trains (lines S8, S9) and regional trains. The regional station is located within Terminal 1, concourse B.

==== Frankfurt South station ====
Long distance trains ICE (left) and Flixtrain (right) in Frankfurt (Main) Süd station

Frankfurt's third long-distance station is Frankfurt South station (Frankfurt Südbahnhof, often abbreviated as Frankfurt (Main) Süd or F-Süd), located in Sachsenhausen. It is an important destination for local trains and trams (lines 15, 16 and 18) and the terminal stop for four U-Bahn lines (U1, U2, U3, U8) as well as three S-Bahn lines (S3, S4, S5). Line S6 also serves the station.

==== Messe stations ====
S-Bahn train arriving Frankfurt-Messe station after passing Emser bridge

The Frankfurt Trade Fair offers two railway stations: Messe station is for local S-Bahn trains (lines S3-S6) and is centrally located amid trade fair premises, while Festhalle/Messe station is served by U-Bahn line U4 and is located at the north-east corner of the premises.

==== Konstablerwache station and Hauptwache station ====
Konstablerwache station, shared platforms of U-Bahn and S-Bahn

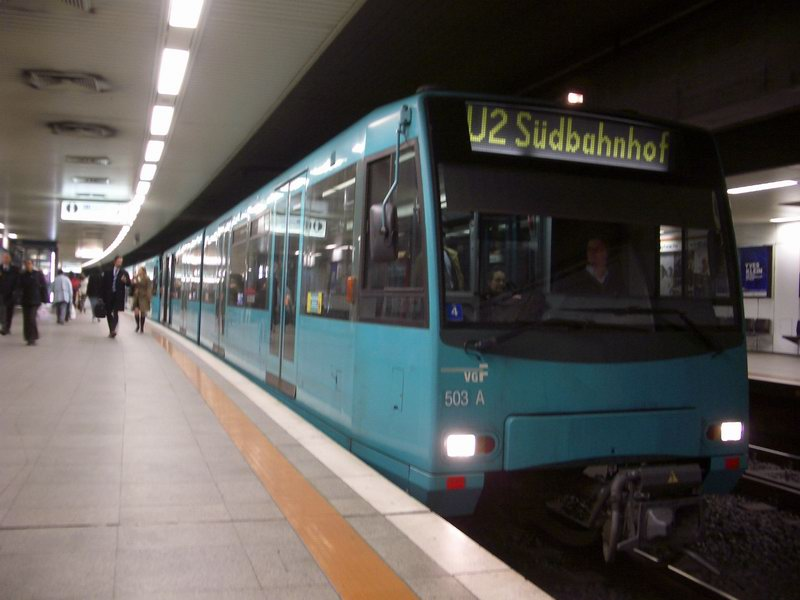
U-Bahn train at Hauptwache station

Two other major downtown railway stations are Konstablerwache and Hauptwache, located on each end of the Zeil. They are the main stations to change from east-to-west-bound S-Bahn trains to north-to-south-bound U-Bahn trains. Konstablerwache station is the second-busiest railway station regarding daily passenger volume (98,000) after the central station. The third-busiest railway station is Hauptwache station (93,000).

==== Frankfurt West Station ====
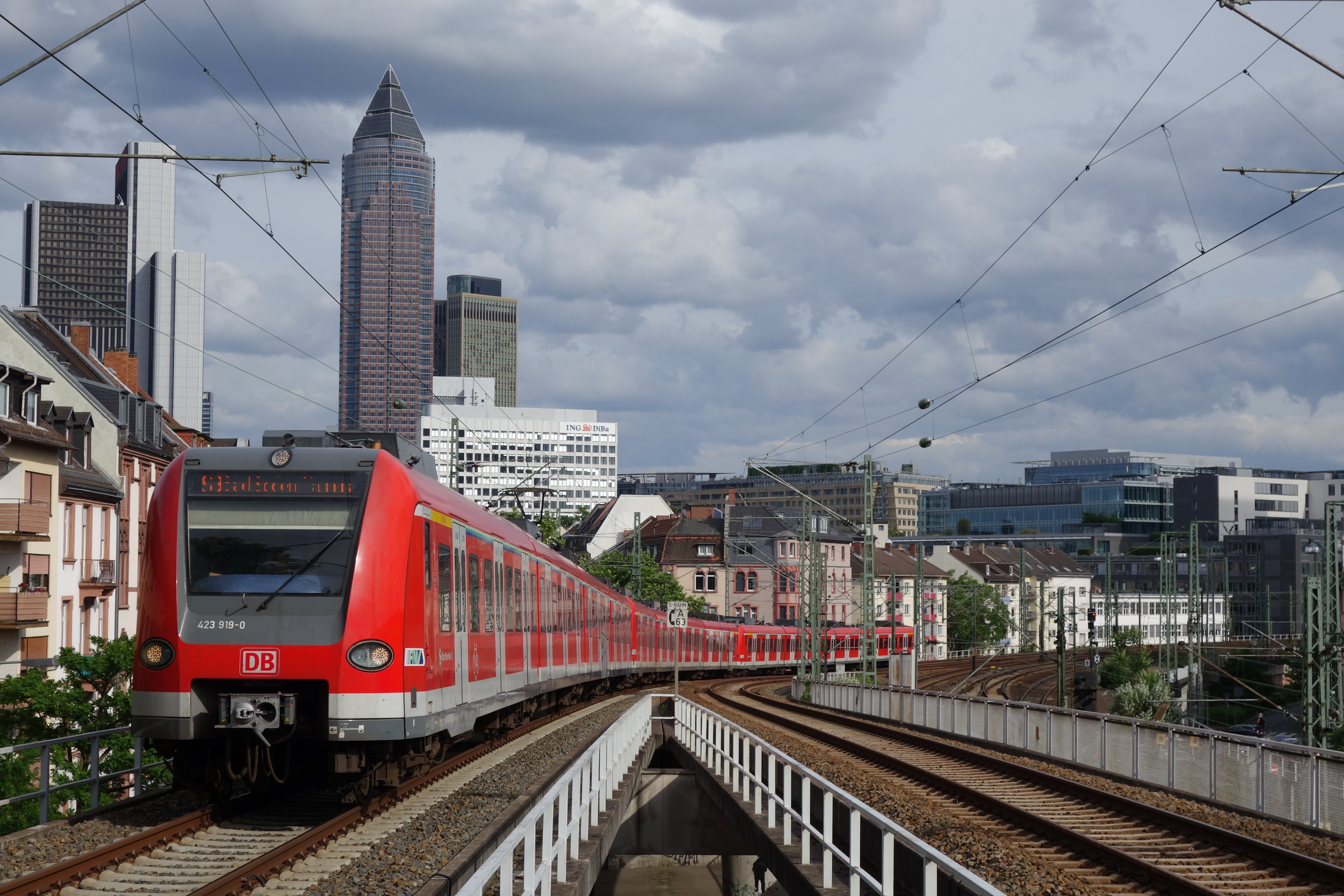
DBAG Class 423 approaching the elevated section of Frankfurt West station

This Station, located in Bockenheim, is served by north-heading Long-Distance ICE trains, multiple regional trains, and four commuter S-Bahn lines (S3, S4, S5, S6). Additionally, it is an important terminal stop for three "Metrobus" lines (M32, M36, M73).

=== Coach stations ===
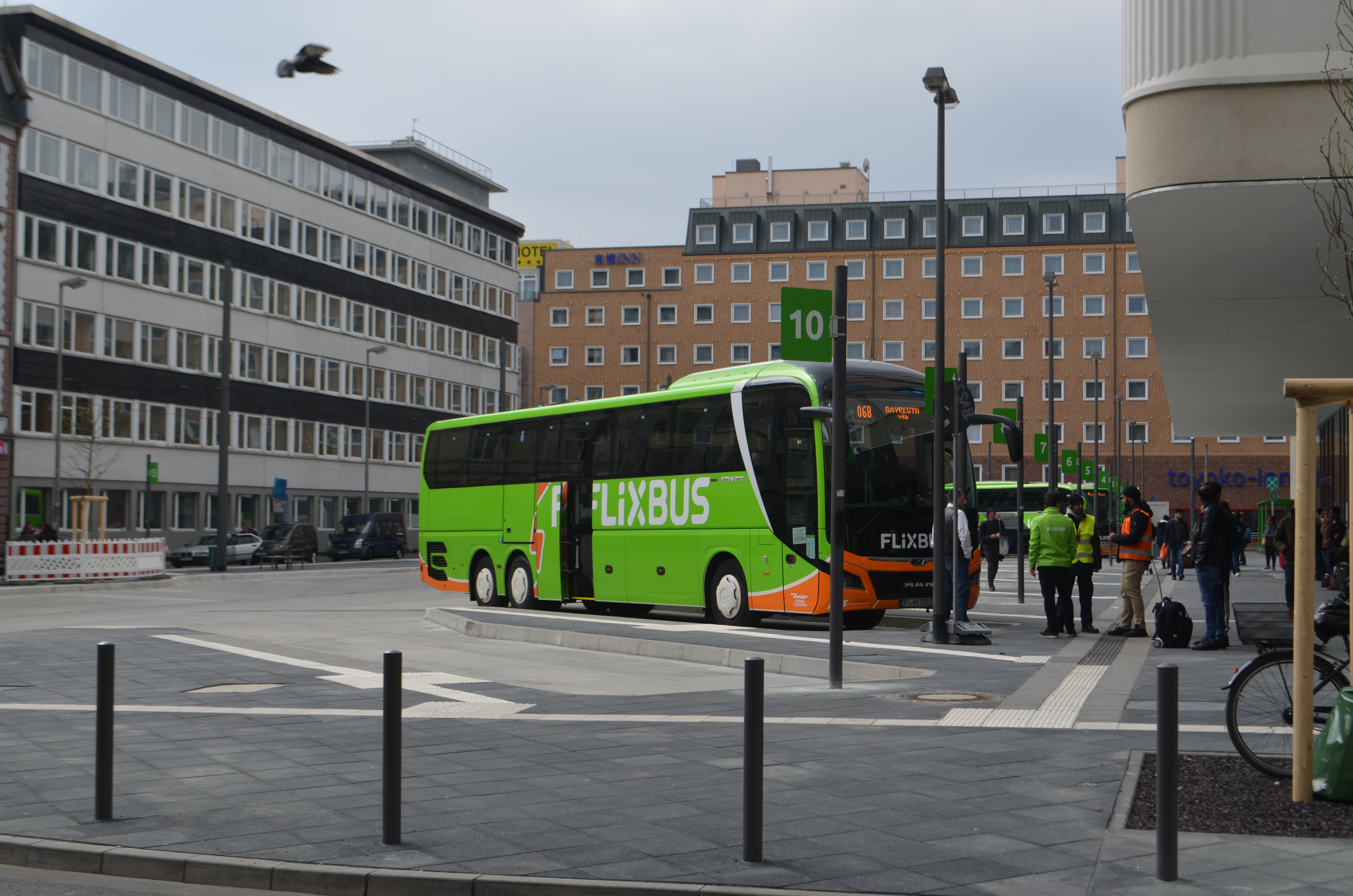
Long distance bus at ZOB Frankfurt close to central train station

There are three stations for intercity bus services in Frankfurt: one at the south side of the Central Station, one at the Terminal 2 of the airport and another one at Stephanstraße.

=== Public transport ===
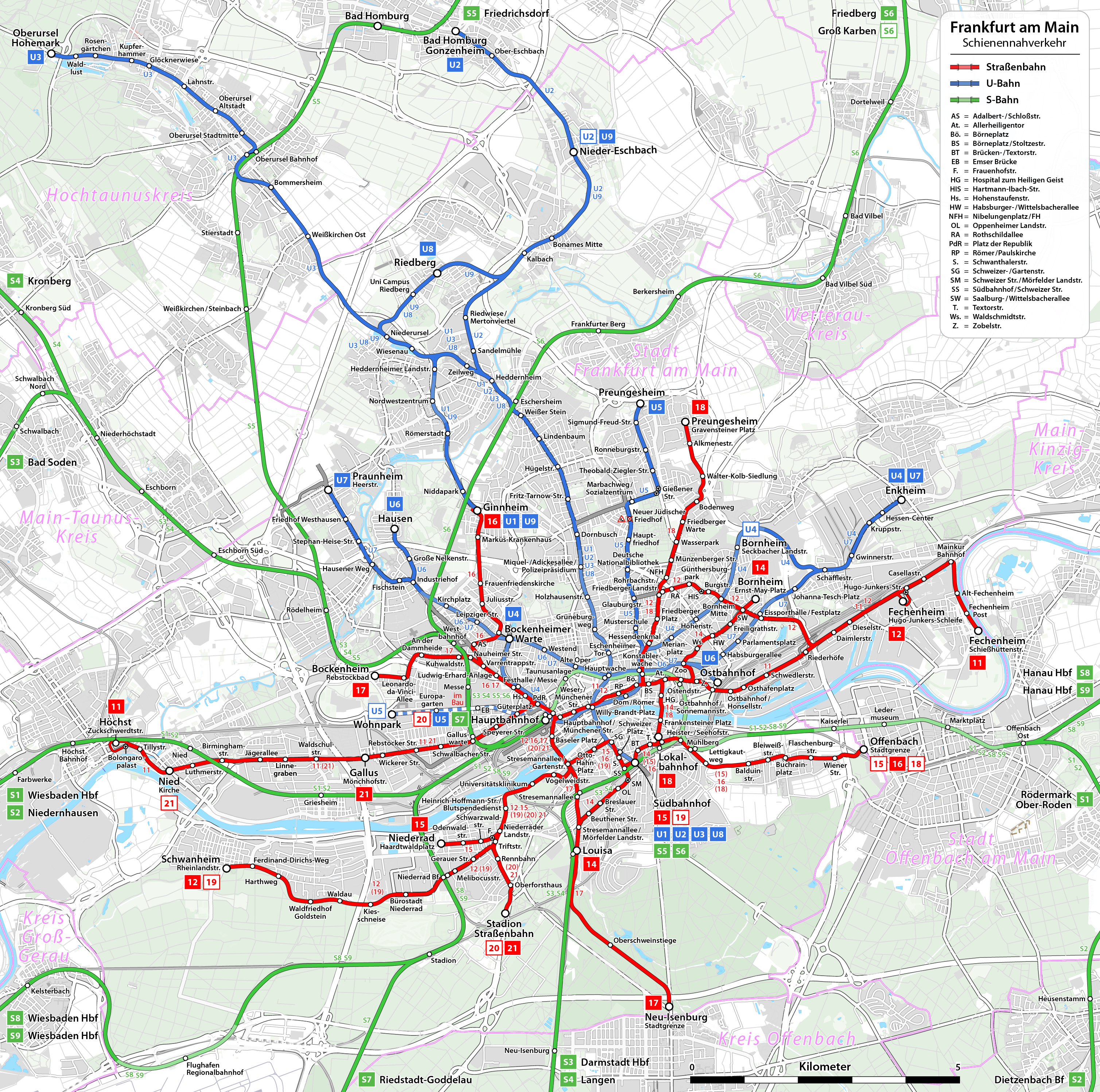
Public transport network

Rhein-Main-Verkehrsverbund (RMV)

The city has two rapid transit systems: the U-Bahn and the S-Bahn, as well as an above-ground tram system. Information about the U- and S-Bahn can be found on the website of the RMV.

==== S-Bahn ====
Nine S-Bahn lines (S1 to S9) connect Frankfurt with the densely populated Rhine Main Region. Most routes have at least 15-minute service during the day, either by one line running every 15 minutes, or by two lines servicing one route at a 30-minute interval. All lines, except line S7, run through the Frankfurt City Tunnel and serve stations at Ostendstraße, Konstablerwache, Hauptwache, Taunusanlage and Frankfurt Central Station. When leaving the city the S-Bahn travels above ground. It provides access to the trade fair (S3, S4, S5, S6), the airport (S8, S9), the stadium (S7, S8, S9) and nearby cities such as Wiesbaden, Mainz, Darmstadt, Rüsselsheim, Hanau, Offenbach am Main, Oberursel, Bad Homburg, Kronberg, Friedberg and smaller towns that are on the way. The S8/S9 runs 24/7.

==== U-Bahn ====
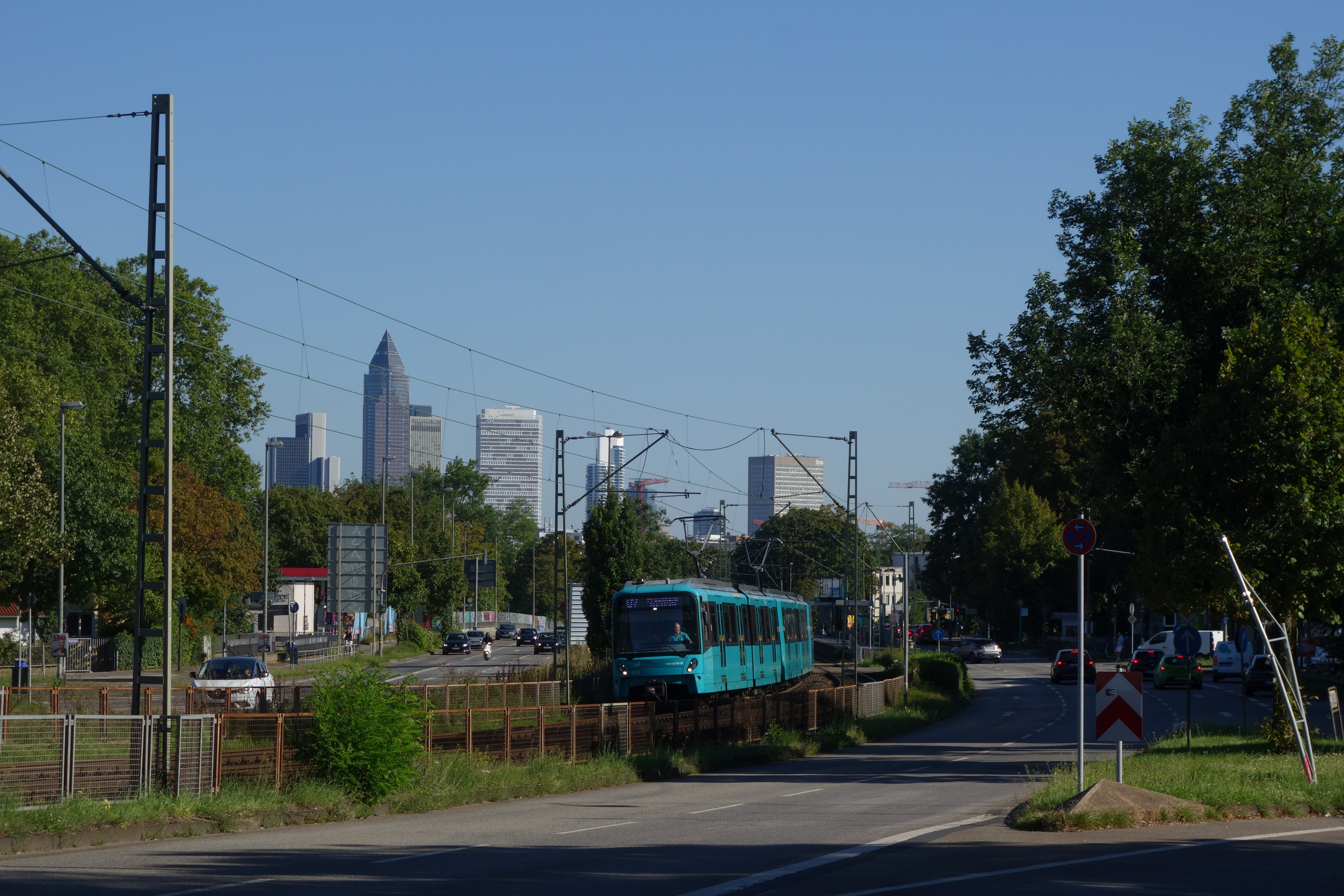
Underground line U7 running as a Stadtbahn amidst Ludwig-Landmann-Straße in Frankfurt-Rödelheim

The U-Bahn has nine lines (U1 to U9) serving Frankfurt and the larger suburbs of Bad Homburg and Oberursel in the north. The trains that run on the U-Bahn are in fact light rail (Stadtbahn) as many lines travel along a track in the middle of the street instead of underground. The minimum service interval is 2.5 minutes, although the usual pattern is that each line runs at 7.5- to 10-minute intervals, which produce between 3- and 5-minute intervals on downtown tracks shared by more than one line.

==== Tram ====
Frankfurt has ten tram lines (11, 12, 14 to 21), with trams arriving usually every 10 minutes. Many sections are served by two lines, combining to run at 5-minute intervals during rush-hour. Trams only run above ground and serve more stops than the U-Bahn or the S-Bahn.

==== Bus ====
A number of bus lines complete the Frankfurt public transport system. Night buses replace U-Bahn and tram services between 1:30 am and 3:30 am. The central junction for the night bus service is at the downtown square of Konstablerwache, where all night bus lines start and end.

=== Taxis ===
Taxicabs can usually be found outside the major S-Bahn and U-Bahn stations, at the central station, the south station, the airport, the trade fair and in the crowded inner-city shopping streets. The common way to obtain a taxi is to either call a taxi operator or to go to a taxi rank. However, although not the norm, one can hail a passing taxi on the street.

Uber ceased operations in Frankfurt on 9 November 2015 after operating in the city for 18 months. However, UberX and local cabs are available through the Uber app.

=== Bicycles ===
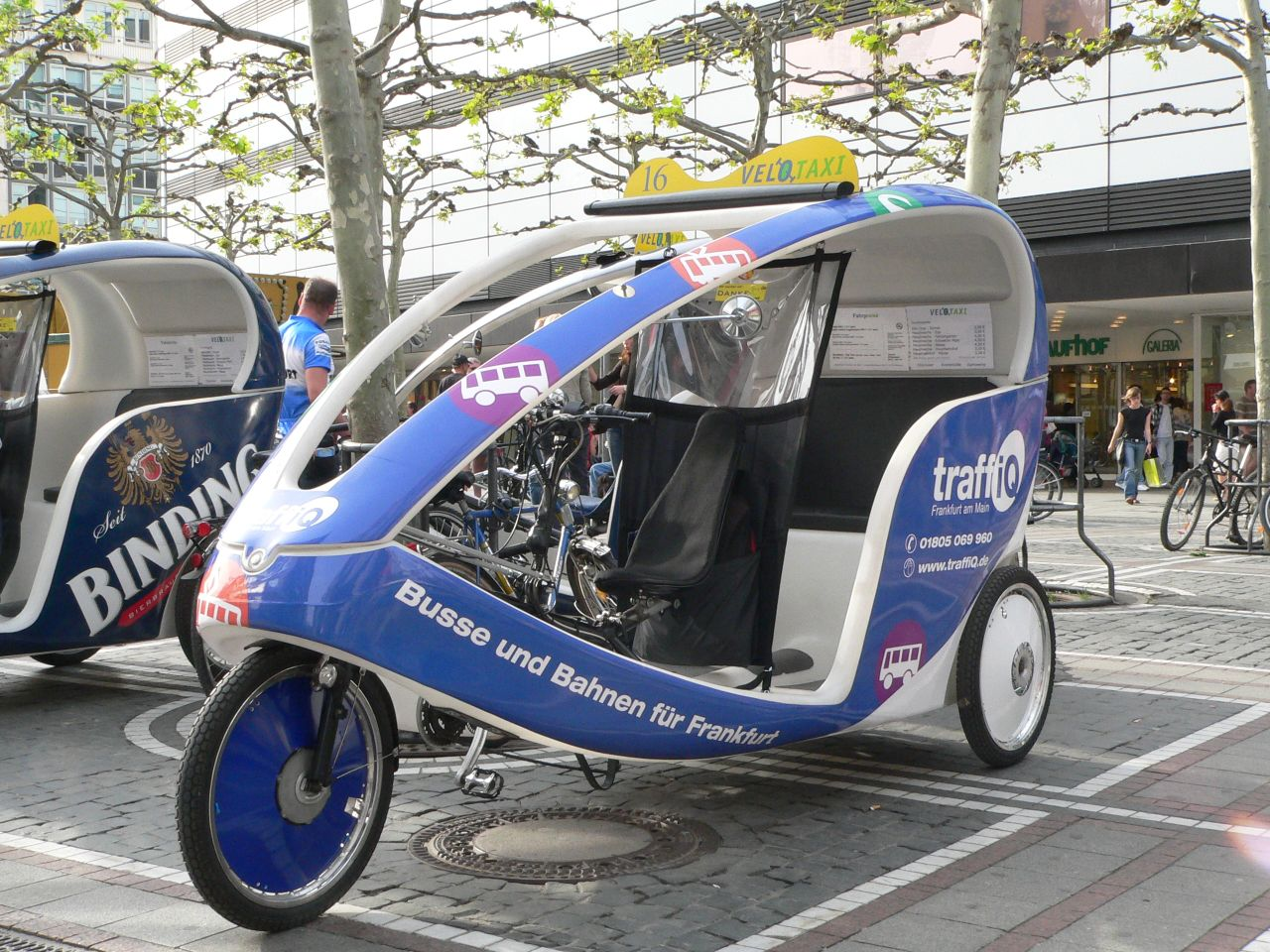
Velotaxi at the Zeil

Deutsche Bahn makes bicycles available for hire through their Call a Bike service. The bicycles are stationed all over the city, including at selected railway stations. They can easily be spotted because of their eye-catching silver-red color. To rent a specific bike, riders either call a service number to get an unlock code or reserve the bike via the smartphone application. To return the bike, the rider locks it within a designated return area (and calls the service number, if not booked via the app).

Nextbike also makes bicycles available for hire in Frankfurt. They are stationed all over the city. These can be spotted with their blue color scheme.

Cycle rickshaws (velotaxis), a type of tricycle designed to carry passengers in addition to the driver, are also available. These are allowed to operate in pedestrian-only areas and are therefore practical for sightseeing.

Frankfurt has a network of cycle routes. Many long-distance bike routes into the city have cycle tracks that are separate from motor vehicle traffic. A number of downtown roads are "bicycle streets" where the cyclist has the right of way and where motorized vehicles are only allowed access if they do not disrupt the cycle users. In addition, cyclists are allowed to ride many cramped one-way streets in both directions. As of 2015, 15 percent of citizens used bicycles.

=== E-Scooters ===
Since 15 June 2019, the use of e-scooters was officially permitted by the German federal government. In Frankfurt, companies like Lime, TIER, Bird, voi., Dott or Bolt are offering their electric micro mobility vehicles for lease. However, their use is being regarded with increasing weariness due to frequent abuse (parking, speeding, vandalism, accidents) and has sparked a public debate about the need of further regulation of the e-scooter market.

== Courts of justice ==
Several courts are located in Frankfurt, including:

- Hessisches Landesarbeitsgericht (Hessian State Employment Court)
- Oberlandesgericht Frankfurt (Higher Regional Court Frankfurt)
- Landgericht Frankfurt (Regional Court Frankfurt)
- Amtsgericht Frankfurt (Local Court Frankfurt)
- Sozialgericht Frankfurt (Social Court Frankfurt)
- Arbeitsgericht Frankfurt (Employment Court Frankfurt)
- Verwaltungsgericht Frankfurt (Administration Court Frankfurt)

== Financial authorities ==
Westhafen Tower, home to the European Insurance and Occupational Pensions Authority (EIOPA)

=== European Insurance and Occupational Pensions Authority ===
The European Insurance and Occupational Pensions Authority (EIOPA) is an institution of the EU and part of the European System of Financial Supervisors that was created in response to the 2008 financial crisis. It was established on 1 January 2011.

=== Federal Financial Supervisory Authority ===
Frankfurt is one of two locations of the German Federal Financial Supervisory Authority (Bundesanstalt für Finanzdienstleistungsaufsicht, short: BaFin). The BaFin is an independent federal institution and acts as Germany's financial regulatory authority.

=== Anti-Money Laundering Authority ===
The Anti-Money Laundering Authority (AMLA) of the European Union (EU) is based in Frankfurt.

== Education and research ==
=== Universities and schools ===
Frankfurt hosts two universities and several specialist schools. The two business schools are Goethe University Frankfurt's Goethe Business School and Frankfurt School of Finance & Management.

==== Johann Wolfgang Goethe University ====
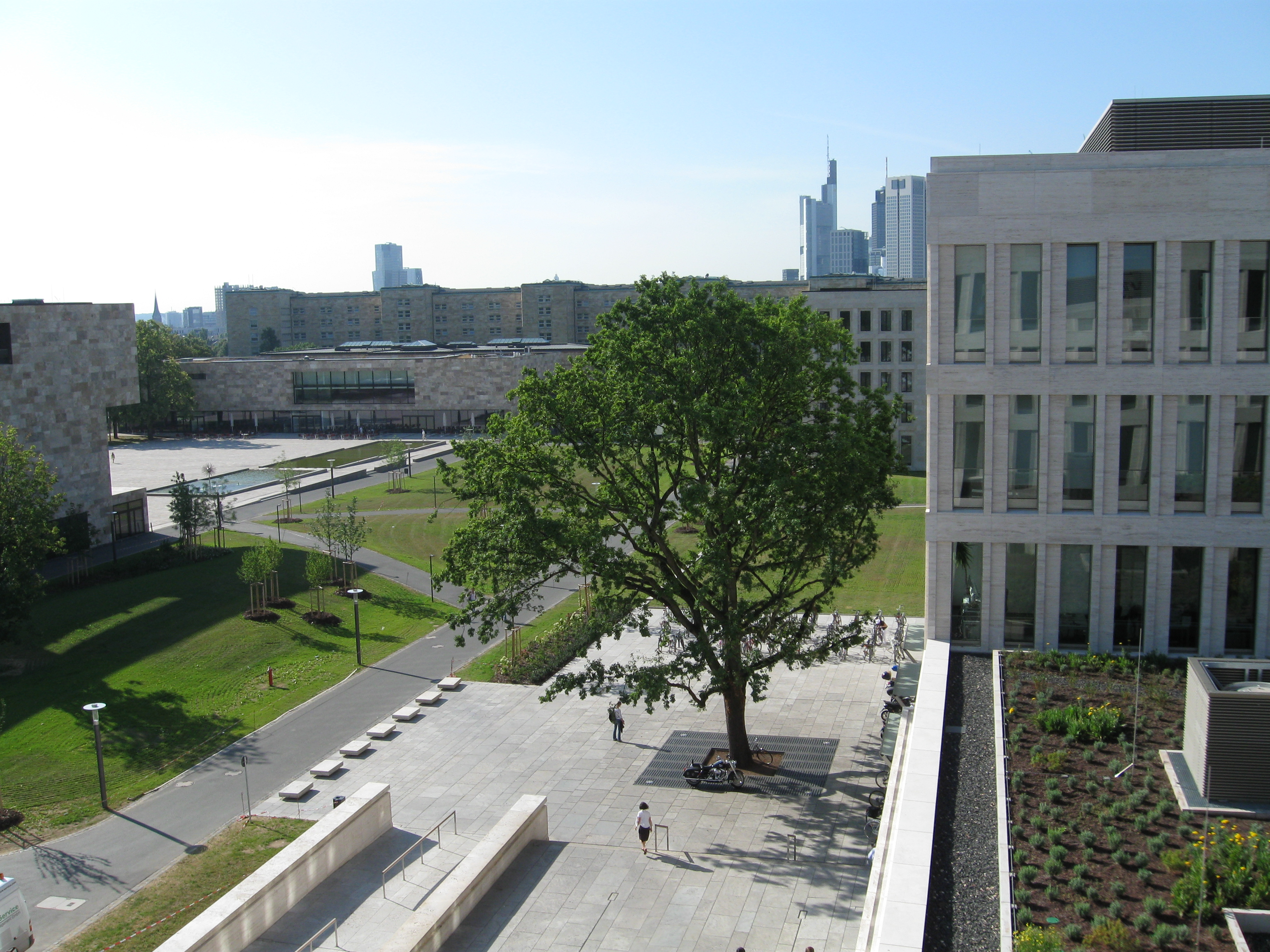
Johann Wolfgang Goethe University

The oldest and best-known university is the Johann Wolfgang Goethe University, with locations in Bockenheim, Westend, and Riedberg, and the university hospital in Niederrad. Goethe Business School is part of the university's House of Finance at Campus Westend. The Business School's Full-Time MBA program has more than 70% international students.

==== Frankfurt University of Applied Sciences ====
The Frankfurt University of Applied Sciences was created out of several older organisations in 1971, and offers more than 38 study areas, in the arts, sciences, engineering and law. Some of the most important research projects: Planet Earth Simulator, FraLine-IT-School-Service, quantitative analysis of methane in human corpses with the help of a mass spectrometer, software engineering (e.g., fraDesk), analysis of qualitative and quantitative gas in human lungs, long-term studies on photovoltaic modules (to name only a few).

==== Frankfurt School of Finance and Management ====
The city is also home to a business school, Frankfurt School of Finance & Management, formerly known as the Hochschule für Bankwirtschaft (Institution of Higher Learning for Banking Economics), with its new campus near Deutsche Nationalbibliothek U-Bahn stop (recently moving from its previous location in the Ostend (Eastend) neighborhood). In 2001, it became a specialist institution for Economics and Management, or FOM. Frankfurt School is consistently ranked among the best business schools in the world, attributed to its high research output and quality of undergraduate and graduate training.

==== Städelschule ====
Frankfurt has the State Institution of Higher Learning for Artistic Education known as the Städelschule, founded in 1817 by Johann Friedrich Städel. It was taken over by the city in 1942 and turned into a state art school.

==== Music schools and conservatory ====
Music institutions are the Frankfurt University of Music and Performing Arts, and the Hoch Conservatory (Dr. Hoch's Konservatorium) which was founded in 1878. The International Ensemble Modern Academy is a significant institution for the study of contemporary music.

==== Other notable schools ====
The Sankt Georgen Graduate School of Philosophy and Theology (German:Philosophisch-Theologische Hochschule Sankt Georgen), a private institution with membership in the German Jesuit Association, has been located in Sachsenhausen since 1950.

=== Research institutes ===
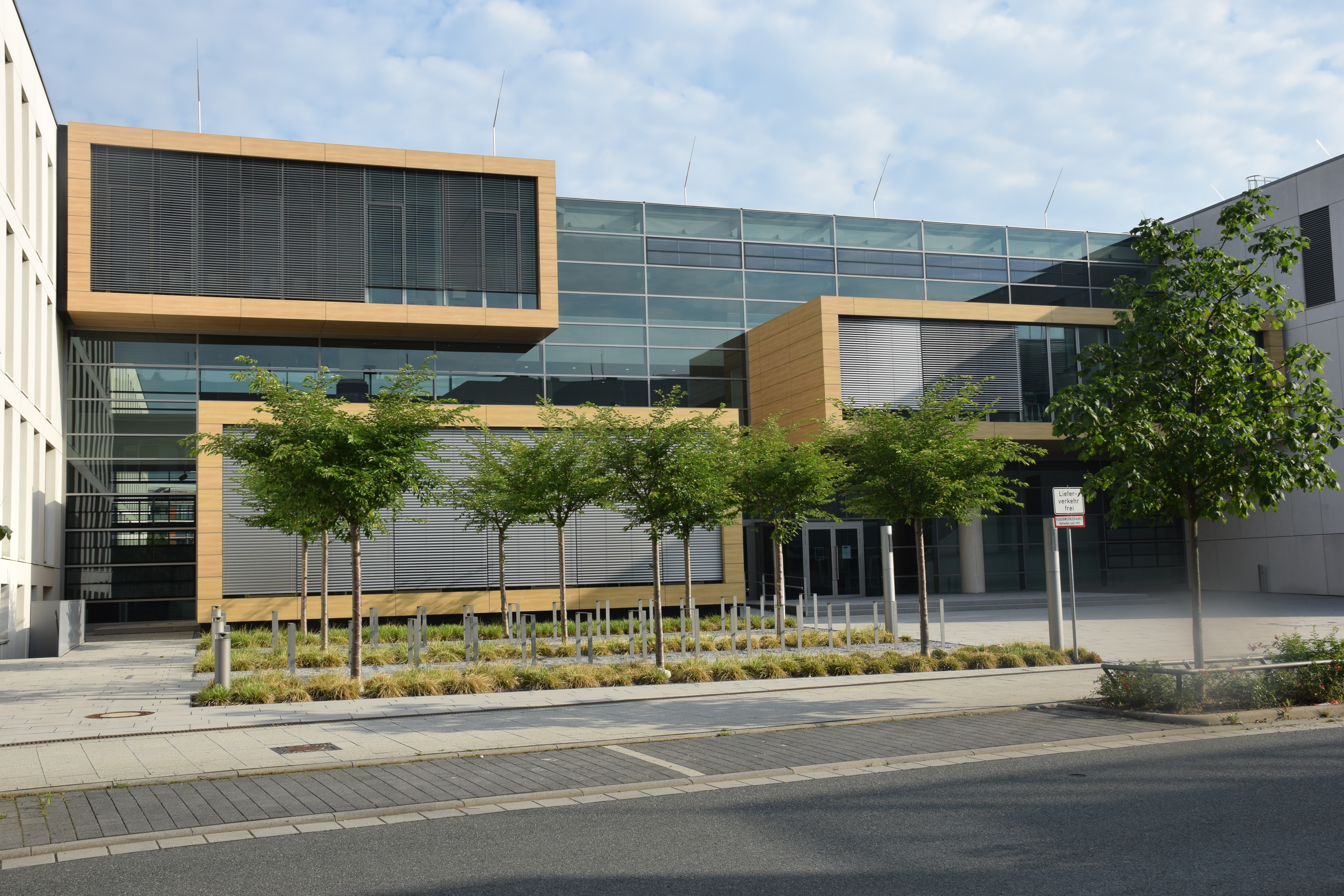
Max Planck Institute for Brain Research

The city is home to four Max Planck Society institutes: the Max Planck Institute for Legal History and Legal Theory, Max Planck Institute for Biophysics, the Max Planck Institute for Brain Research, and the Max Planck Institute for Empirical Aesthetics.

The Frankfurt Institute for Advanced Studies, sponsored by several institutional and private sources, is involved in theoretical research in physics, chemistry, neuroscience, and computer science.

Frankfurt is host to the Römisch-Germanische-Kommission (RGK), the German Archaeological Institute branch for prehistoric archeology in Germany and Europe. The RGK is involved in a variety of research projects. Its library, with more than 200,000 items, is one of the largest archeological libraries in the world.

Goethe University and Frankfurt University of Applied Sciences are involved in the Hessian Center for Artificial Intelligence ("hessian.AI").

== Trade unions and associations ==
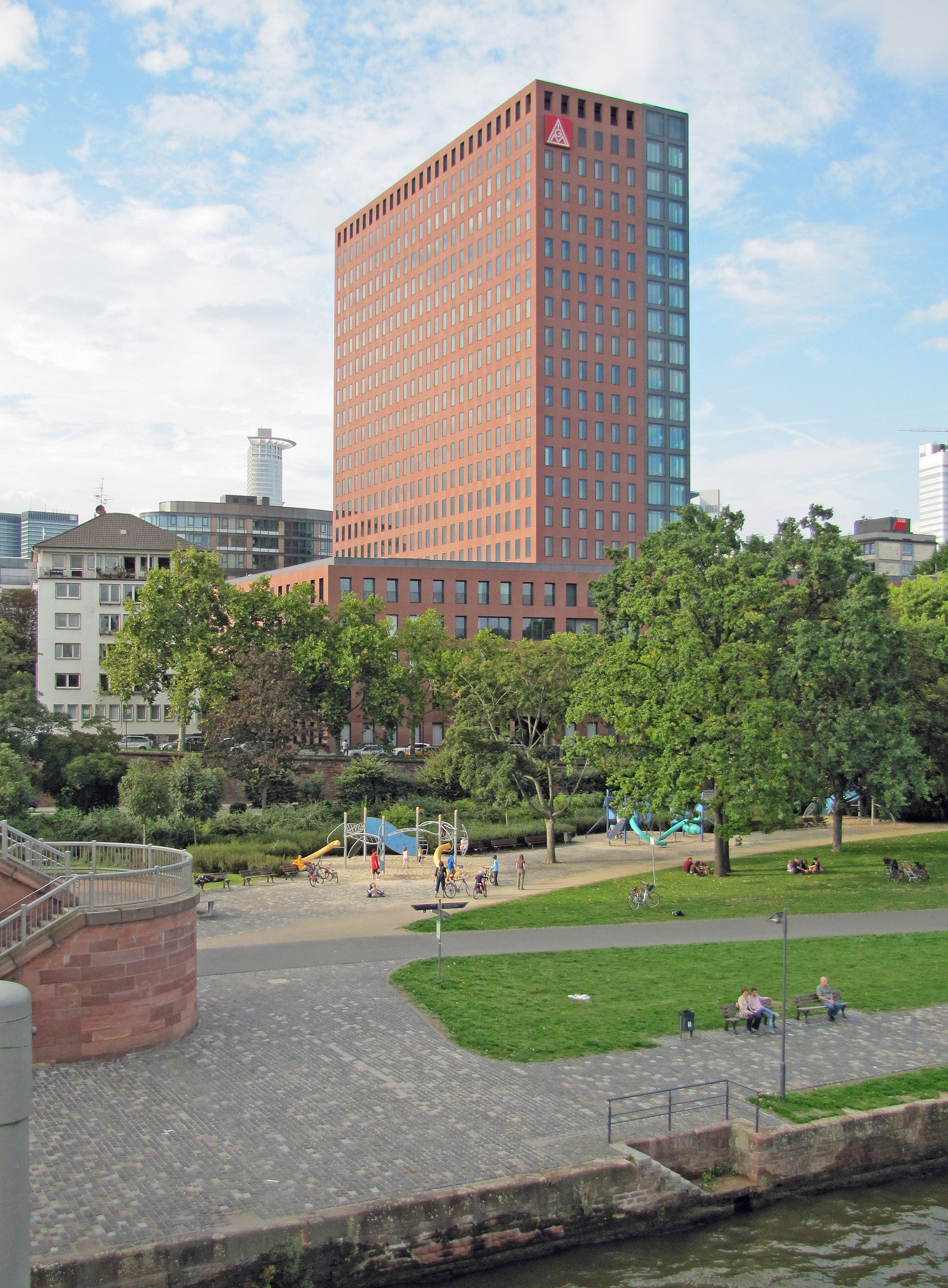
Main Forum, home to IG Metall

Frankfurt is home to multiple trade unions and associations, including:

- IG Metall, Germany's largest metalworkers trade union, based at the Main Forum high-rise building in the Gutleutviertel district
- IG Bauen-Agrar-Umwelt, a union for construction and engineering workers,
- Gewerkschaft Erziehung und Wissenschaft, a union for teachers
- Gewerkschaft Deutscher Lokomotivführer, a union for train drivers

Trade associations include:

- Verband der Elektrotechnik, Elektronik und Informationstechnik (Electrotechnical, Electronic and Information Technology Association)
- DECHEMA Gesellschaft für Chemische Technik und Biotechnologie (Applied Chemistry and Biotechnology Association)
- Börsenverein des Deutschen Buchhandels, which organizes the Frankfurt Book Fair
- Bundesverband des Deutschen Versandhandels (German Mail Order Industry Association)
- Verband der Chemischen Industrie (Chemical Industry Association)
- Verband der Photoindustrie (Photography Industry Association)
- Verband Deutscher Maschinen- und Anlagenbau (German Machine and Equipment Building Association)
- Verband der Köche Deutschlands (German Cooks Association)

== Sports ==
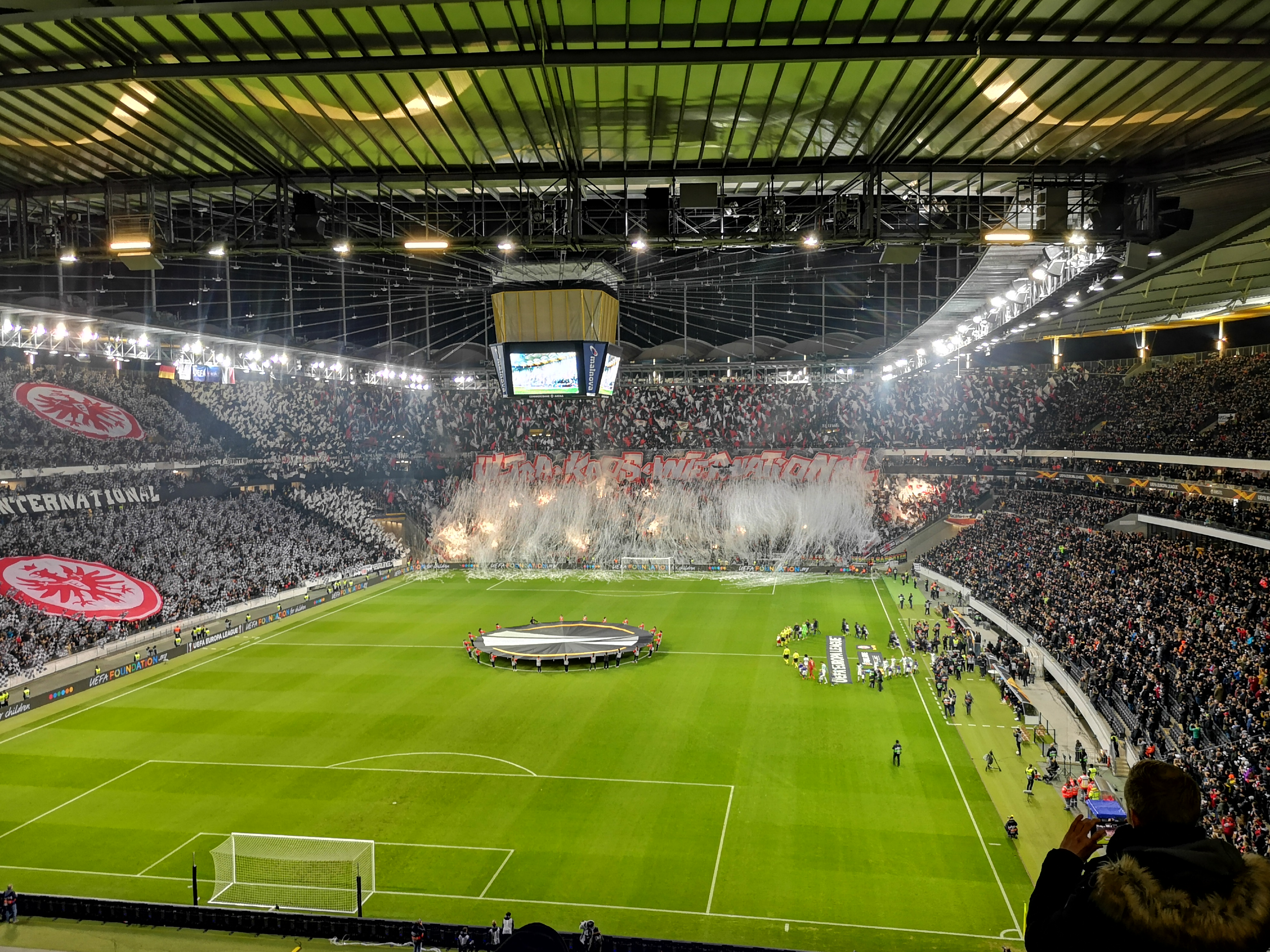
The Waldstadion (As of 2023 known as the Deutsche Bank Park), home of the football club Eintracht Frankfurt

Frankfurt is home to several professional sports teams. Some of them have won German Championships. Basketball side Skyliners Frankfurt won the German Basketball Championship in 2004 and the German Cup in 2000. Football sides Eintracht Frankfurt (formerly 1. FFC Frankfurt) is one of Germany's most successful clubs in women's football, with a shared record of title-holders of the Frauen-Bundesliga, while Eintracht Frankfurt are one of Germany's most traditional clubs in men's football, being one-time German champions, five-times winners of the DFB-Pokal, two time winners of the UEFA Europa League (formerly UEFA Cup) in 1980 and 2022 and one time runner-up of the UEFA Champions League in 1959-60 and UEFA Super Cup in 2022. Other following sports teams or clubs in Frankfurt include:

- Frankfurt Galaxy, American football
- Frankfurt Universe, American football
- Frankfurt Pirates, American football
- Frankfurt Sarsfields GAA, Gaelic football
- Frankfurt Lions (until 2010), Ice hockey
- Löwen Frankfurt (since 2010), Ice hockey
- SC 1880 Frankfurt, Rugby union
- FSV Frankfurt, Football (men)
- Rot-Weiss Frankfurt, Football
- Frankfurter FC Germania 1894, Football

Frankfurt is host to the classic cycle race Eschborn-Frankfurt City Loop (known as Rund um den Henninger-Turm from 1961 to 2008). The city hosts also the annual Frankfurt Marathon and the Ironman Germany. In addition to the former, it is one of 13 global host locations to the J.P. Morgan Corporate Challenge, Germany's biggest corporate sports event. Rhein-Main Eissport Club forms the base of the German bandy community.

== Sights in the Frankfurt Rhein-Main area ==
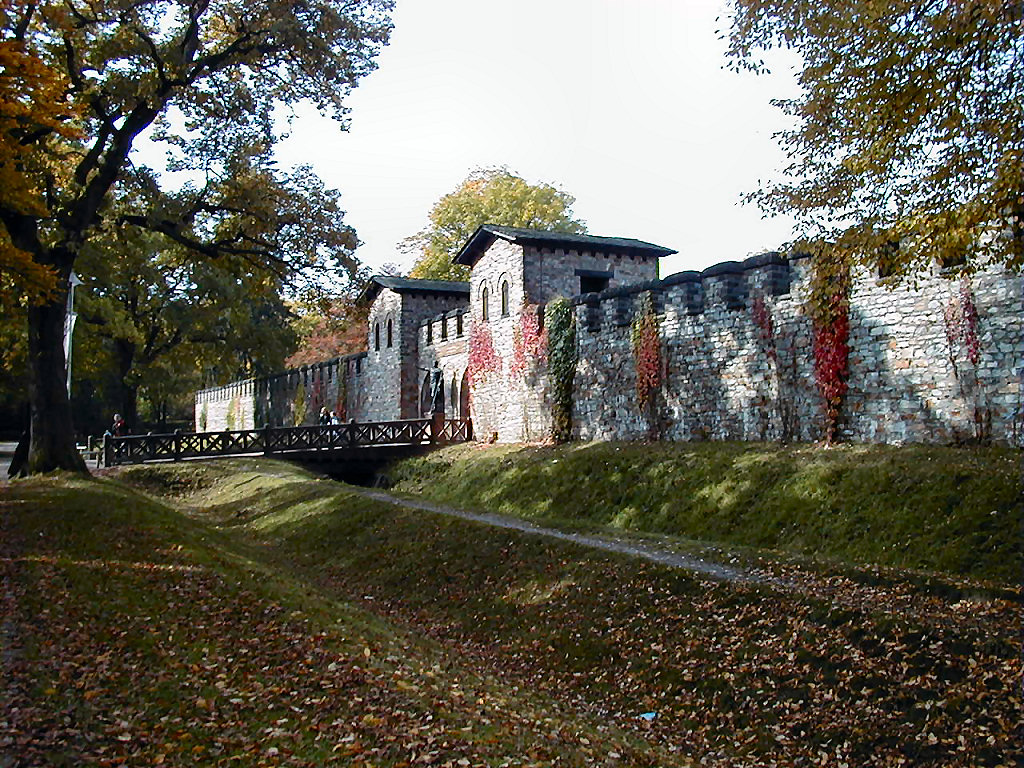
Roman Empire army camp Saalburg

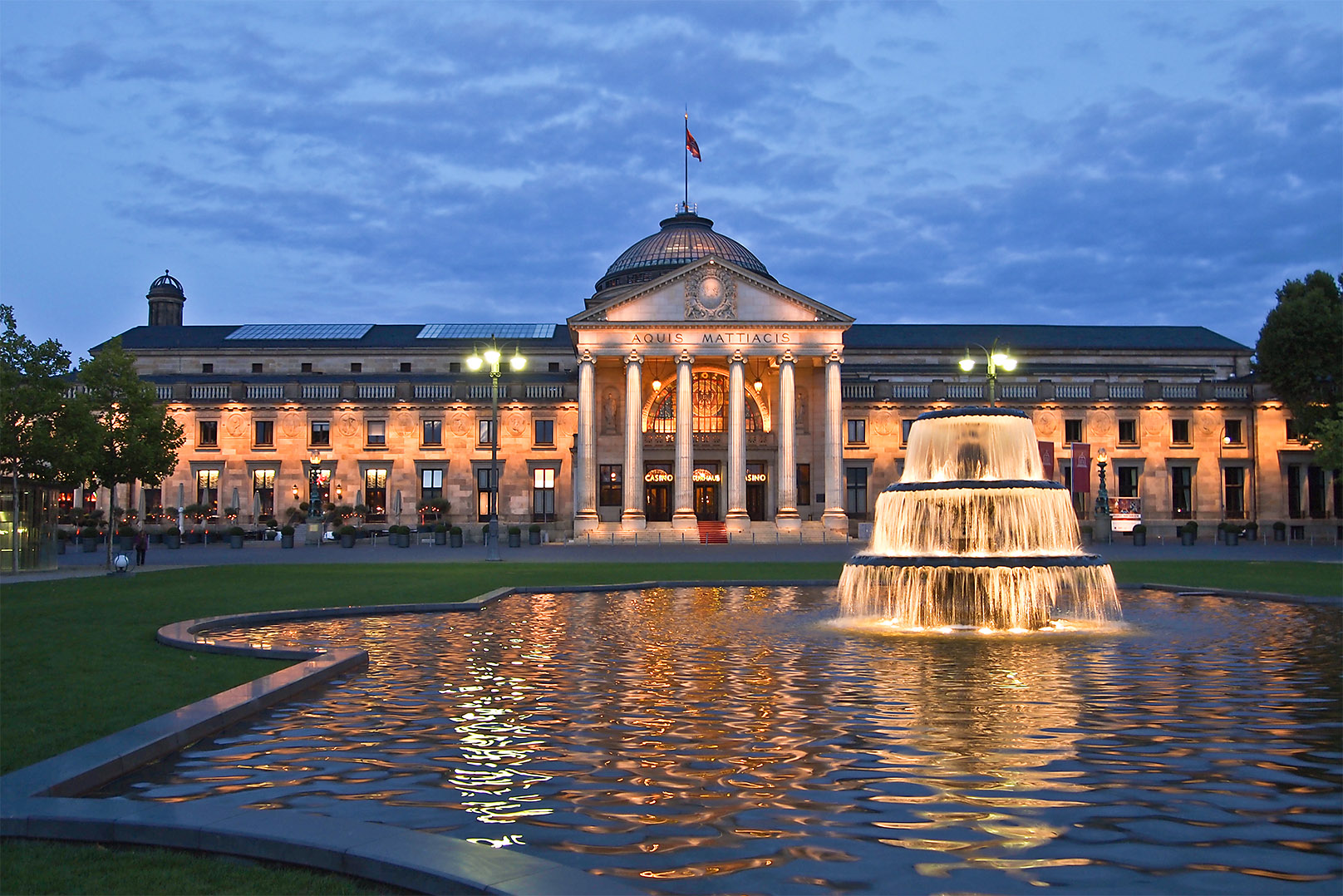
Wiesbaden Kurhaus with the Casino

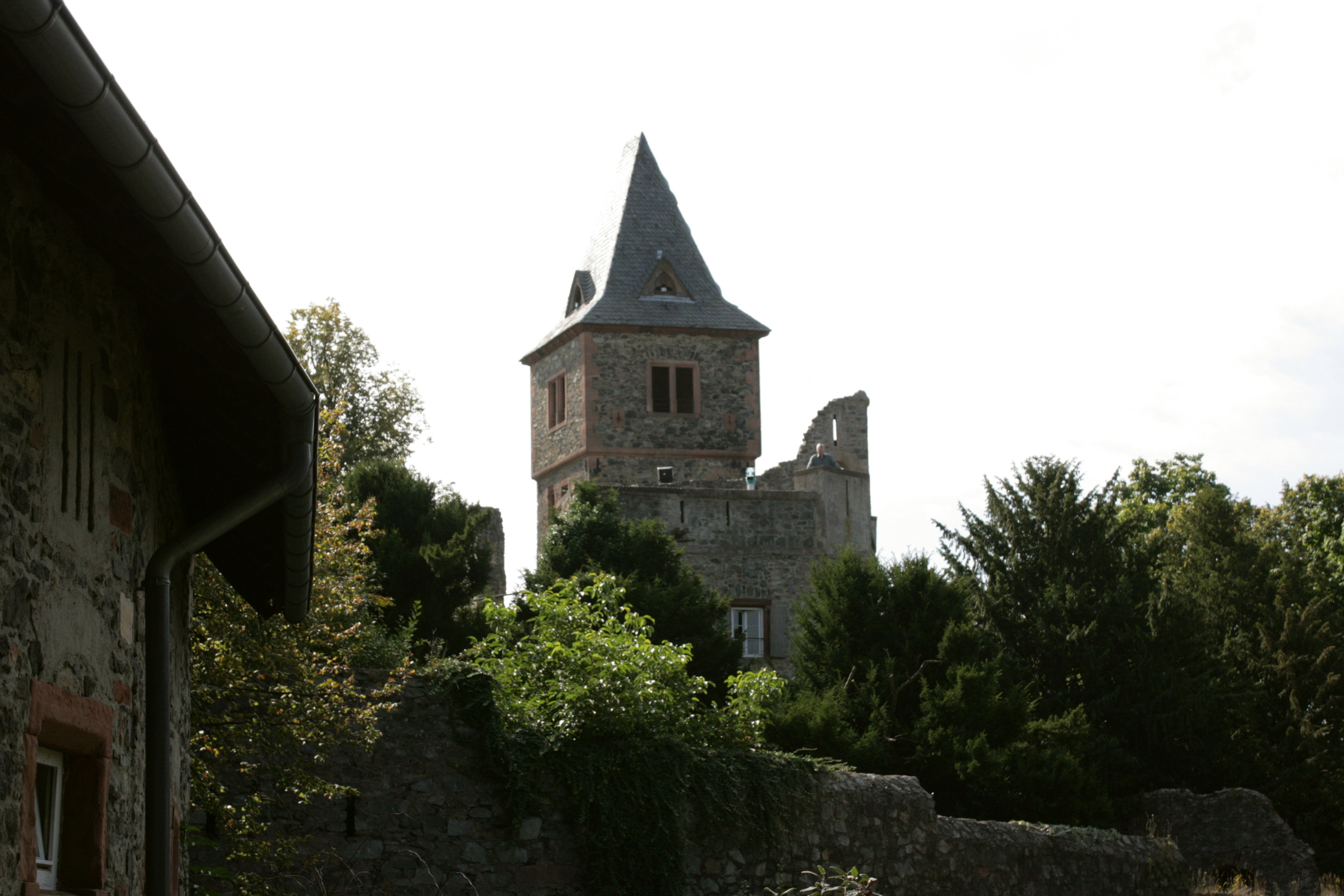
The real Frankenstein Castle

Besides the tourist attractions in central Frankfurt many internationally famous sites are within 80 km (50 mi) of the city, such as:

=== North ===
- Taunus mountain range
- World Heritage Site Roman Empire Army Camp Saalburg
- World Heritage Site Limes (former northern border of the Roman Empire)
- Bad Homburg vor der Höhe with its famous casino
- Hessenpark

=== West ===
- Wiesbaden with its Kurhaus, State Theater, Neroberg and Casino
- World Heritage Site Mainz
- Rüdesheim
- Rheingau
- Eberbach Monastery (the original movie set of the film The Name of the Rose)
- Rhine Valley
- World Heritage Site Rhine Gorge
- River Rhine
- Rheinhessen wine region

=== East ===
- Hanau Grimm Brothers Summer Festival
- German Fairy Tale Route
- Spessart

=== South ===
- Darmstadt with the Art Nouveau World Heritage Site Mathildenhöhe
- Waldspirale
- The former private chapel of the last Tsar of Russia
- Vortex Garden
- World Heritage Site Messel pit
- Odenwald
- Bergstrasse
- Frankenstein Castle
- Heidelberg

== International relations ==
=== Twin towns – sister cities ===
Frankfurt is twinned with:

- (United Kingdom) Birmingham, West Midlands, England (1966)
- Budapest, Hungary (1990)
- Deuil-la-Barre, Val d'Oise, France (1967); formerly twinned with Nieder-Eschbach, incorporated into Frankfurt in 1972)
- Dubai, Emirate of Dubai, United Arab Emirates (2005)
- Eskişehir, Eskişehir Province, Turkey (2013)
- Granada, Granada Department, Nicaragua (1991)
- Guangzhou, Guangdong, China (1988)
- Kraków, Poland (1991)
- Leipzig, Saxony, Germany (1990)
- Lyon, France (1960)
- Melbourne, Victoria, Australia
- Milan, Lombardy, Italy (1970)
- Philadelphia, Pennsylvania, United States (2015)
- Prague, Czech Republic (1990)
- Tel Aviv, Gush Dan, Israel (1980)
- Toronto, Ontario, Canada (1989)

=== Friendly cities ===
Frankfurt has friendly relations with:

- Cairo, Egypt (1979)
- Yokohama, Kanagawa, Japan (2011)
- Lviv, Ukraine (2024)

=== International Finance Corporation ===
Frankfurt is home to the German office of the International Finance Corporation (IFC), which is part of the World Bank Group. The IFC promotes sustainable private sector investment in developing countries.

=== Consulates ===
Frankfurt hosts 93 diplomatic missions (consulates and consulates-general). The Consulate General of the United States in Eckenheim is the largest American consulate in the world.

== See also ==
- Frankfurt School
- List of people from Frankfurt
- Mayor of Frankfurt
- List of cities in Hesse by population
- List of cities in Germany by population
