= Dornbusch (Frankfurt am Main) =

- Quarter of Frankfurt am Main
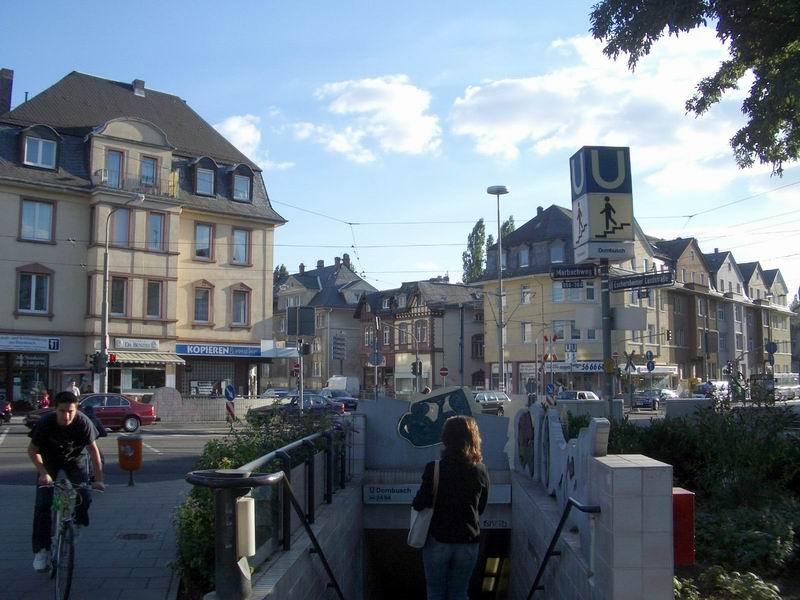
- U-Bahn station "Dornbusch" at the intersection Eschersheimer Landstraße/Marbachweg

- Location of Dornbusch (red) and the Ortsbezirk Mitte-Nord (light red) within Frankfurt am Main
- Interactive map of Dornbusch
- Location within Germany Location within Hesse
- Coordinates: 50°08′22″N 08°40′14″E
- Country: Germany
- State: Hesse
- Admin. region: Darmstadt
- District: Urban district
- City: Frankfurt am Main

Area
  - Total: 2.325 km^{2} (0.898 sq mi)

Population (2020-12-31)
  - Total: 18,715
  - Density: 8,049/km^{2} (20,850/sq mi)
- Time zone: UTC+01:00 (CET)
  - Summer (DST): UTC+02:00 (CEST)
- Postal codes: 60320, 60431, 60433
- Dialling codes: 069
- Vehicle registration: F
- Website: www.frankfurt.de

Dornbusch (German pronunciation: [ˈdɔʁnˌbʊʃ], lit. 'Thornbush') is a quarter of Frankfurt am Main in Hesse, Germany. It is located north of the city center and north of the River Main, and is part of the Ortsbezirk Mitte-Nord. Dornbusch is clockwise surrounded by Eschersheim, Eckenheim, Nordend-West, Westend-Nord, Bockenheim, and Ginnheim.

Dornbusch was created in 1946, and does not have a historic core, because as opposed to the adjacent quarters, it did not develop out of a former village. Before World War II, the western half of what is now Dornbusch was part of Frankfurt-Ginnheim, and the eastern half belonged to Frankfurt-Eckenheim.

The name "Dornbusch" derives from the fact that there grew thornbushes on both sides of what is today Dornbusch's main traffic axis, the Eschersheimer Landstraße (Eschersheim Country Road), until the end of the 19th century. These thornbushes were once part of the Frankfurt city fortifications. The southern border of Dornbusch approximately constituted the northern city border of Frankfurt from the Middle Ages to the annexation of Frankfurt by Prussia in 1866. The next settlement to the north was Eschersheim (now Frankfurt-Eschersheim).

The Sinaipark (Sinaipark), named after the former Sinai-Gärtnerei (Sinai plant nursery), with the Sinai-Wildnis (Sinai-Wilderness) is located at the center of Dornbusch. It was created between 1983 and 1986.

The name "Dornbusch" is known throughout Hesse because of the "Funkhaus am Dornbusch" (Broadcasting Center at the Thornbush), the headquarters of Hessischer Rundfunk, the public radio and television broadcaster of Hesse. Although being named after Dornbusch, the building is located immediately south of the border of Dornbusch in Nordend-West.

== Geography ==
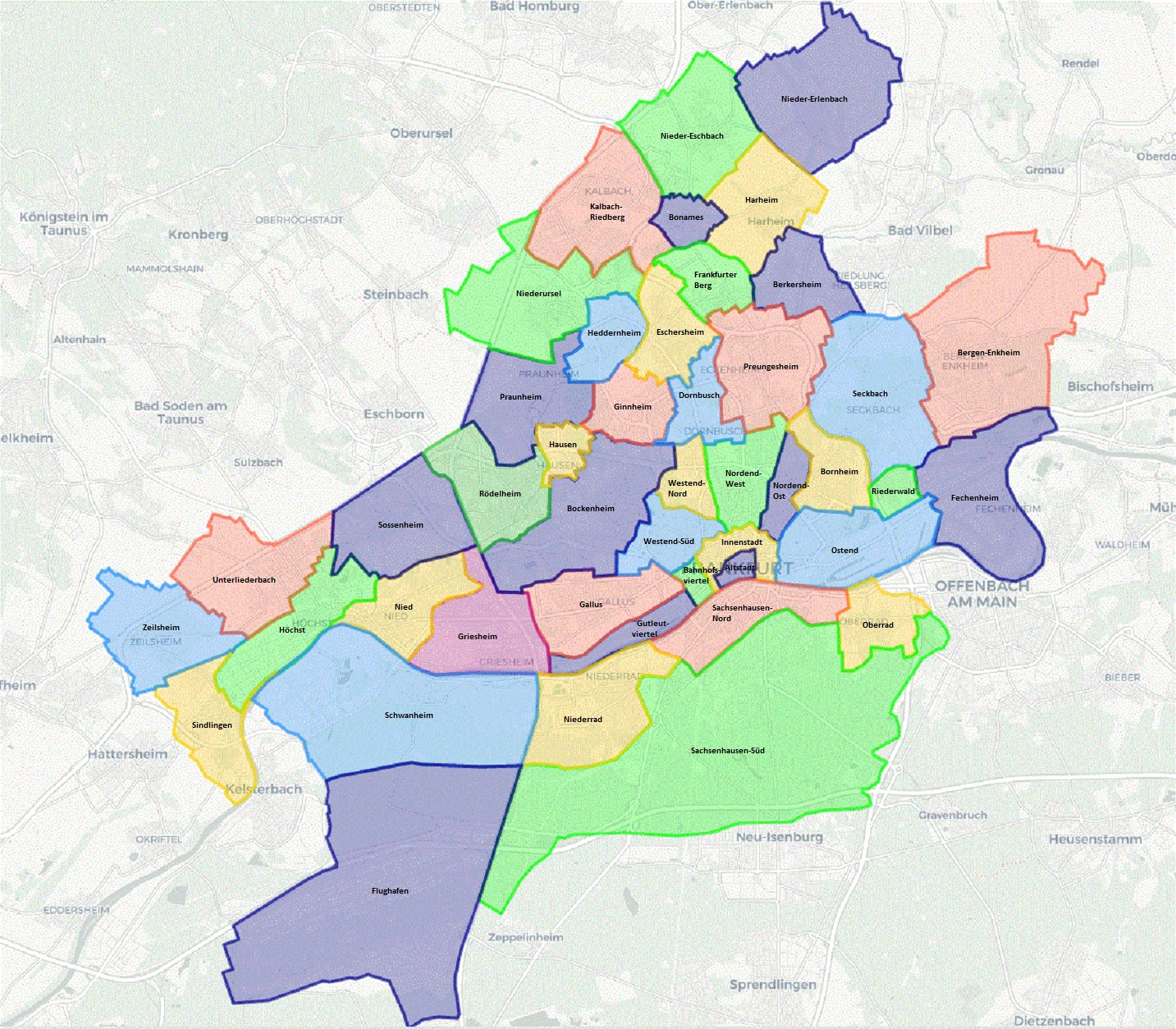
Map of Frankfurt's quarters, Dornbusch in light blue in the northern middle

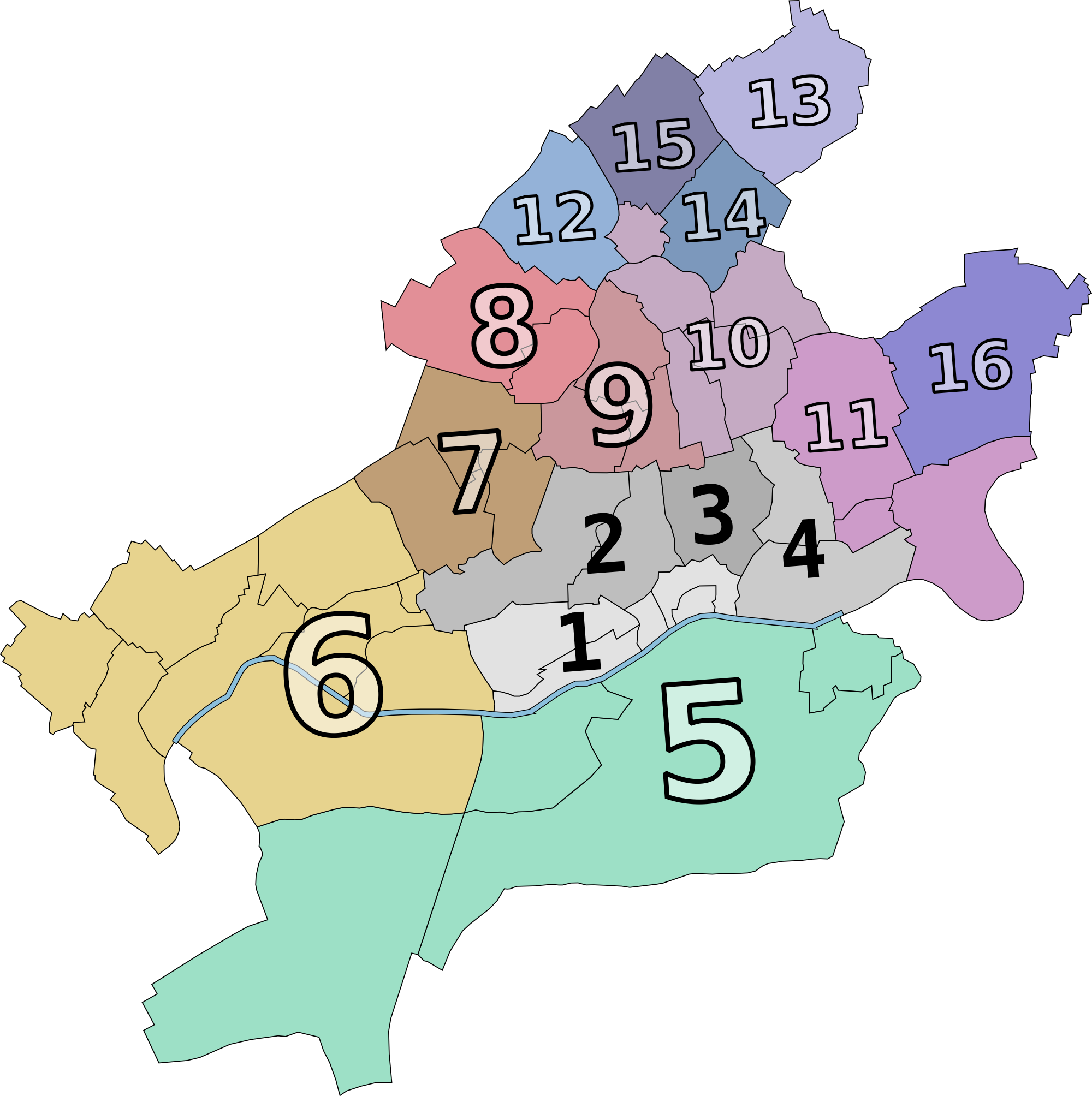
Map of Frankfurt's Ortsbezirke, Dornbusch lying in number 9

Location of Ortsbezirk Mitte-Nord (number 9) within Frankfurt

Subdivision of Ortsbezirk Mitte-Nord into Dornbusch, Eschersheim, and Ginnheim

== Frankfurt U-Bahn in Dornbusch ==
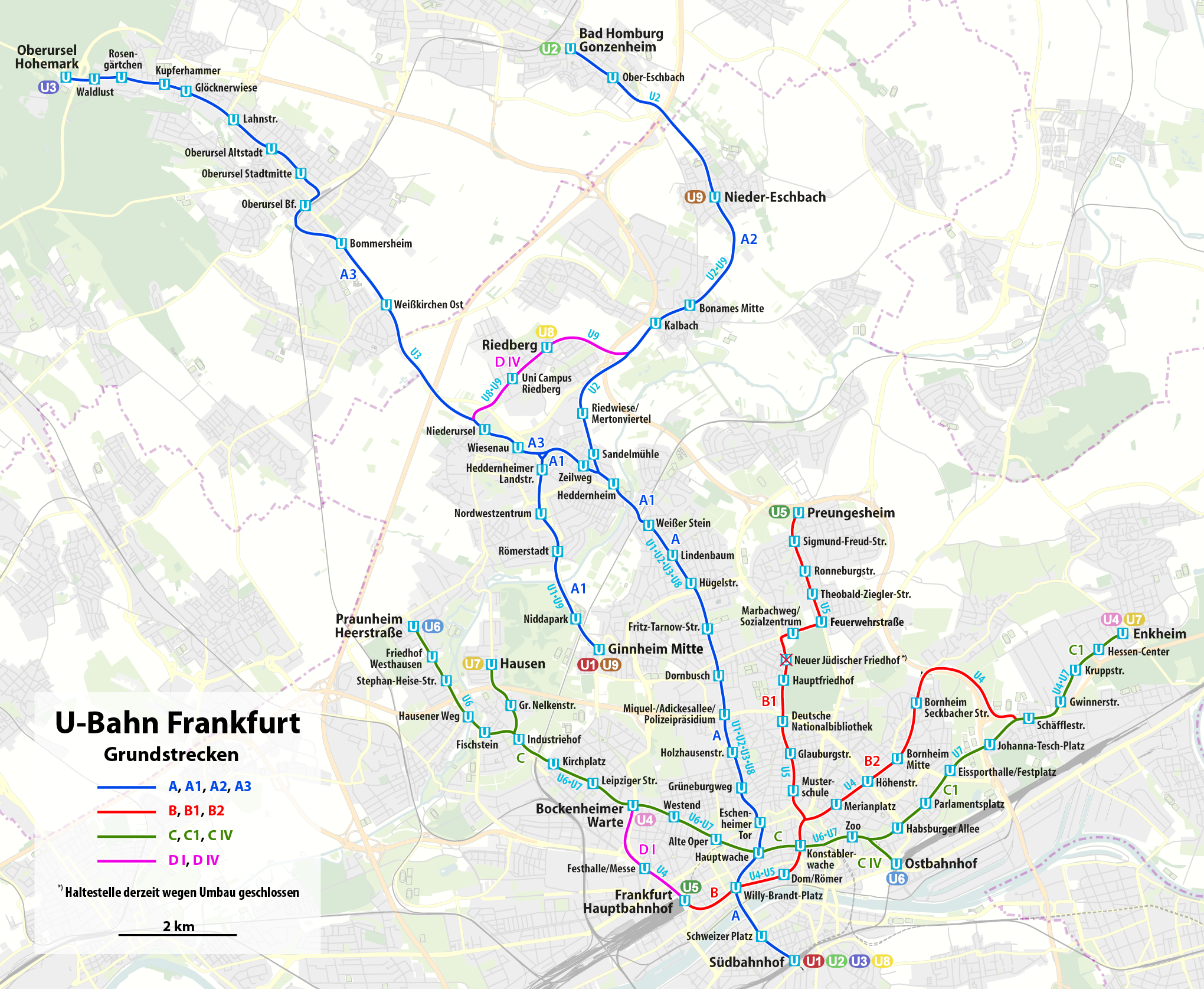
Map of Frankfurt's subway. The blue line A (U1, U2, U3 and U8) leads through Dornbusch (stations "Dornbusch", "Fritz-Tarnow-Straße" and "Hügelstraße"), and was opened first, in 1968. The red line B (U5 to Preungesheim) touches the eastern edges of Dornbusch (stations "Hauptfriedhof", "Neuer Jüdischer Friedhof" and "Marbachweg/Sozialzentrum")

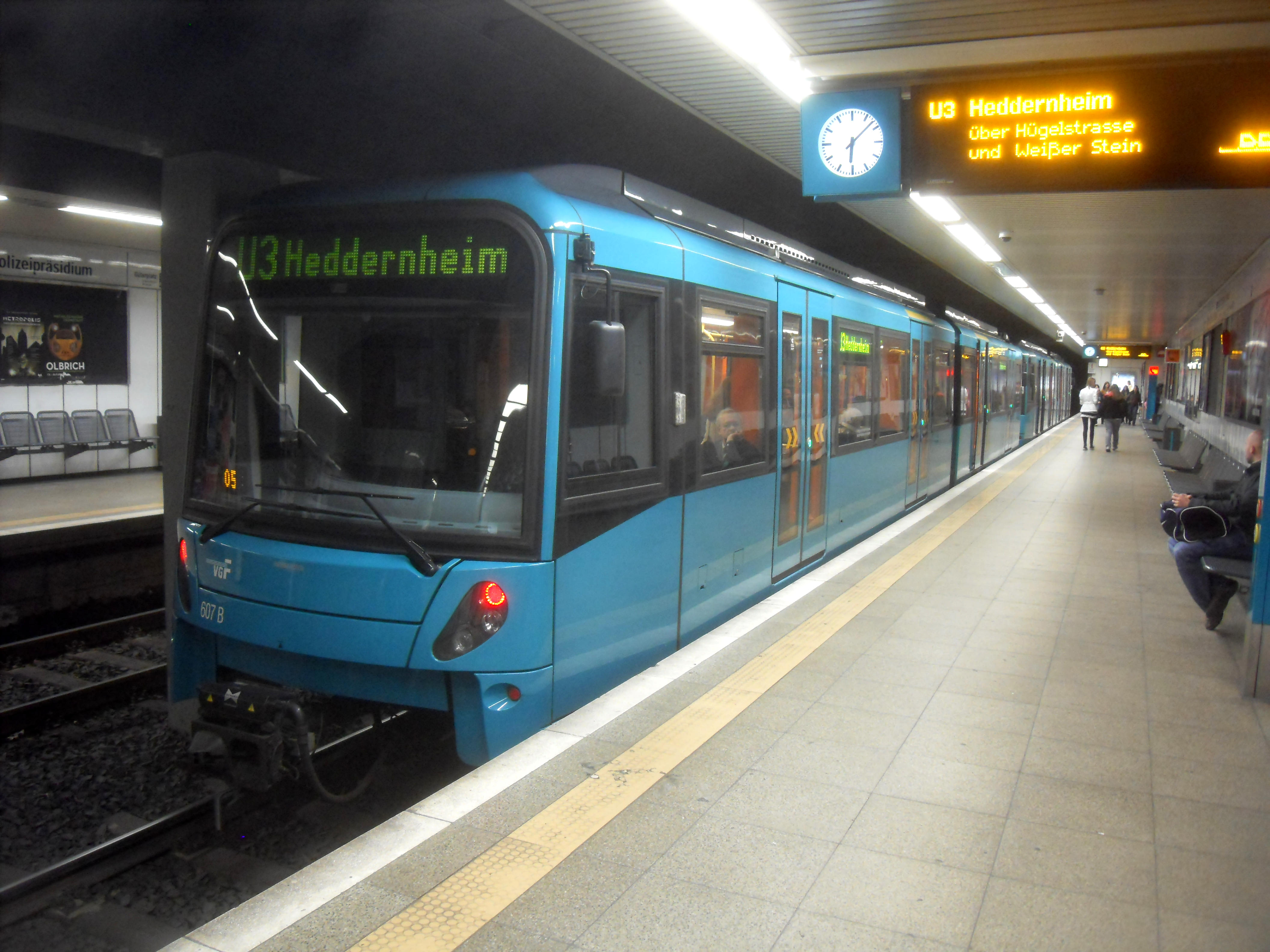
A subway leaving the station "Miquel-/Adickesallee/Polizeipräsidium" in the direction of "Heddernheim", via Dornbusch. The display reads: "über Hügelstrasse und Weißer Stein" (via Hill Street and White Stone).

=== Line A ===
Dornbusch is crossed by the so called Line A of the Frankfurt Subway. Line A is the oldest part of the subway, opened in 1968. There are three subway stations in Dornbusch. These are from south to north:

- "Dornbusch (Hessischer Rundfunk)" (Thornbush (Hessian Broadcasting))
- "Fritz-Tarnow-Straße" (Fritz-Tarnow-Street) and
- "Hügelstraße" (Hill Street)

The next station to the north, "Lindenbaum" (Linden Tree), is already located in Eschersheim. All three stations in Dornbusch are served by lines

- U1 (Frankfurt Süd → Ginnheim)
- U2 (Frankfurt Süd → Bad Homburg-Gonzenheim)
- U3 (Frankfurt Süd → Oberursel-Hohemark) and
- U8 (Frankfurt Süd → Riedberg)

Although the stations are called U-Bahn stations (Untergrundbahn = underground train), all of them are located above ground in the middle of Eschersheimer Landstraße (Eschersheim Country Road). The U-Bahn tracks cannot be crossed except at the stations, and hence divide Dornbusch into a western and an eastern part. The subway enters the tunnel south of Dornbusch in the direction of the city center, between the stations "Dornbusch (Hessischer Rundfunk)" and "Miquel-/Adickesallee/Polizeipräsidium" (Miquel-/Adickes Avenue/Police Headquarters), which is the first station located underground. Via the stations "Holzhausenstraße" (Holzhausen Street), "Grüneburgweg" (Grüneburg Way) and "Eschenheimer Tor" (Eschenheim Gate), the subway reaches the city centre of Frankfurt at the station "Hauptwache/Zeil" (Main Police Station/Zeil).

=== Line B ===
Line B (U5 Frankfurt Hauptbahnhof → Preungesheim) also touches Dornbusch's territory. The stations

- "Hauptfriedhof" (Main Cemetery) and
- "Neuer Jüdischer Friedhof" (New Jewish Cemetery) (currently closed; will be newly constructed)

are on the border between Dornbusch and Nordend-West, and the station

- "Marbachweg/Sozialzentrum" (Marbach Way/Social Centre)

is on the border between Dornbusch and Eckenheim.

== Famous residents ==
=== Anne Frank ===
Anne Frank's first residence at Marbachweg 307, where she lived from 1929 to 1931, is located in the middle between the stations "Dornbusch (Hessischer Rundfunk)" of line A in the west, and "Marbachweg/Sozialzentrum" of line B in the east, east of Eschersheimer Landstraße, while her second residence at Ganghoferstraße 24, where she resided from 1931 to 1933, is located between the stations "Fritz-Tarnow-Straße" and "Hügelstraße", west of Eschersheimer Landstraße. Ganghoferstraße is located in the "Dichterviertel" (Poets' Quarter), an upper class neighbourhood where the streets are named after famous poets. When the Franks resided there, Marbachweg 307 still belonged to Frankfurt-Eckenheim, while Ganghoferstraße 24 lay in Frankfurt-Ginnheim. Dornbusch was only created in 1946 out of parts of Eckenheim and Ginnheim. In 1933, Edith, Margot and Anne Frank moved to Edith's mother at Pastorplatz 1 in Aachen before settling in Amsterdam.

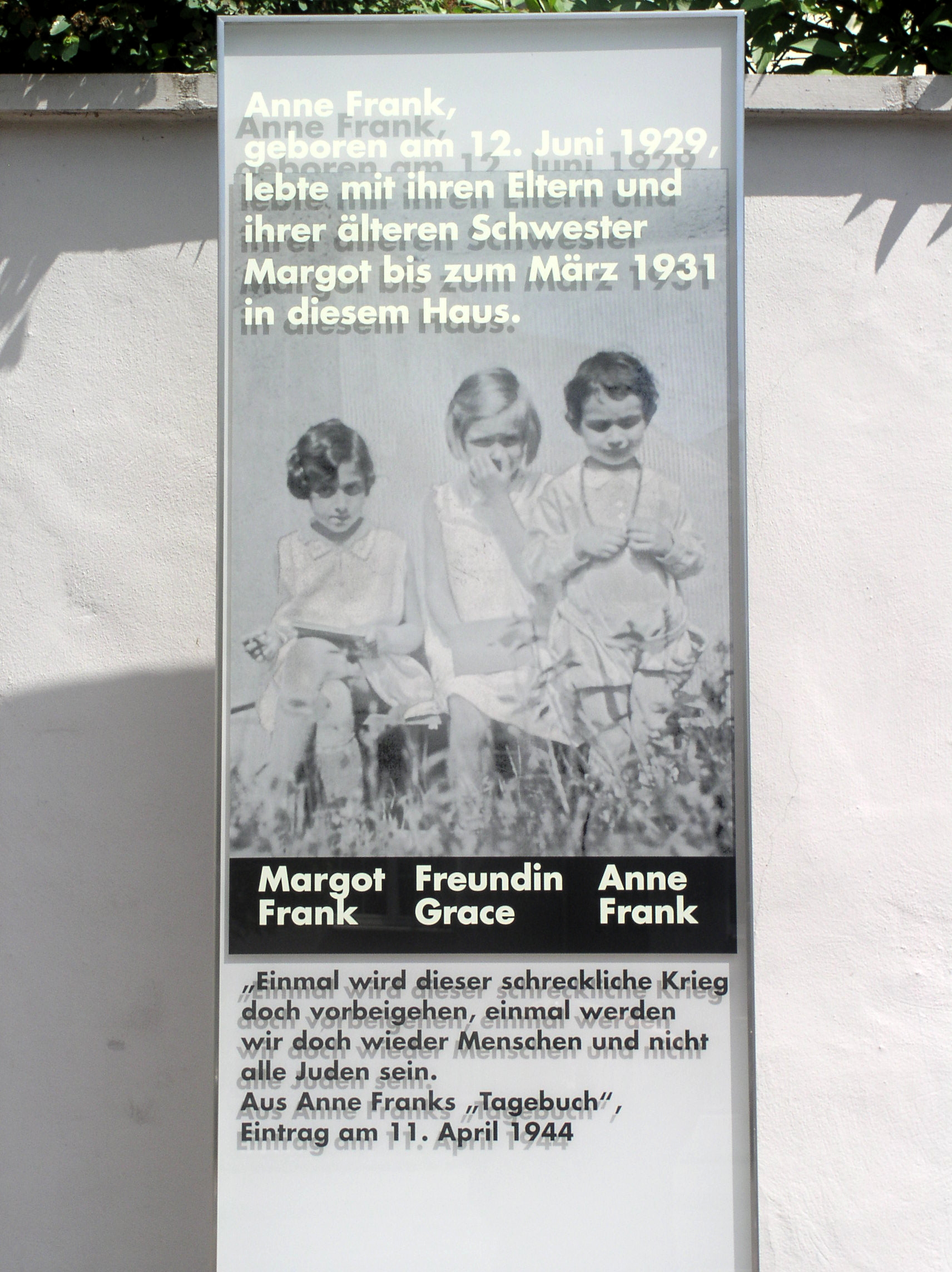
Stele in front of the Franks' first home (1927-1931) at Marbachweg 307

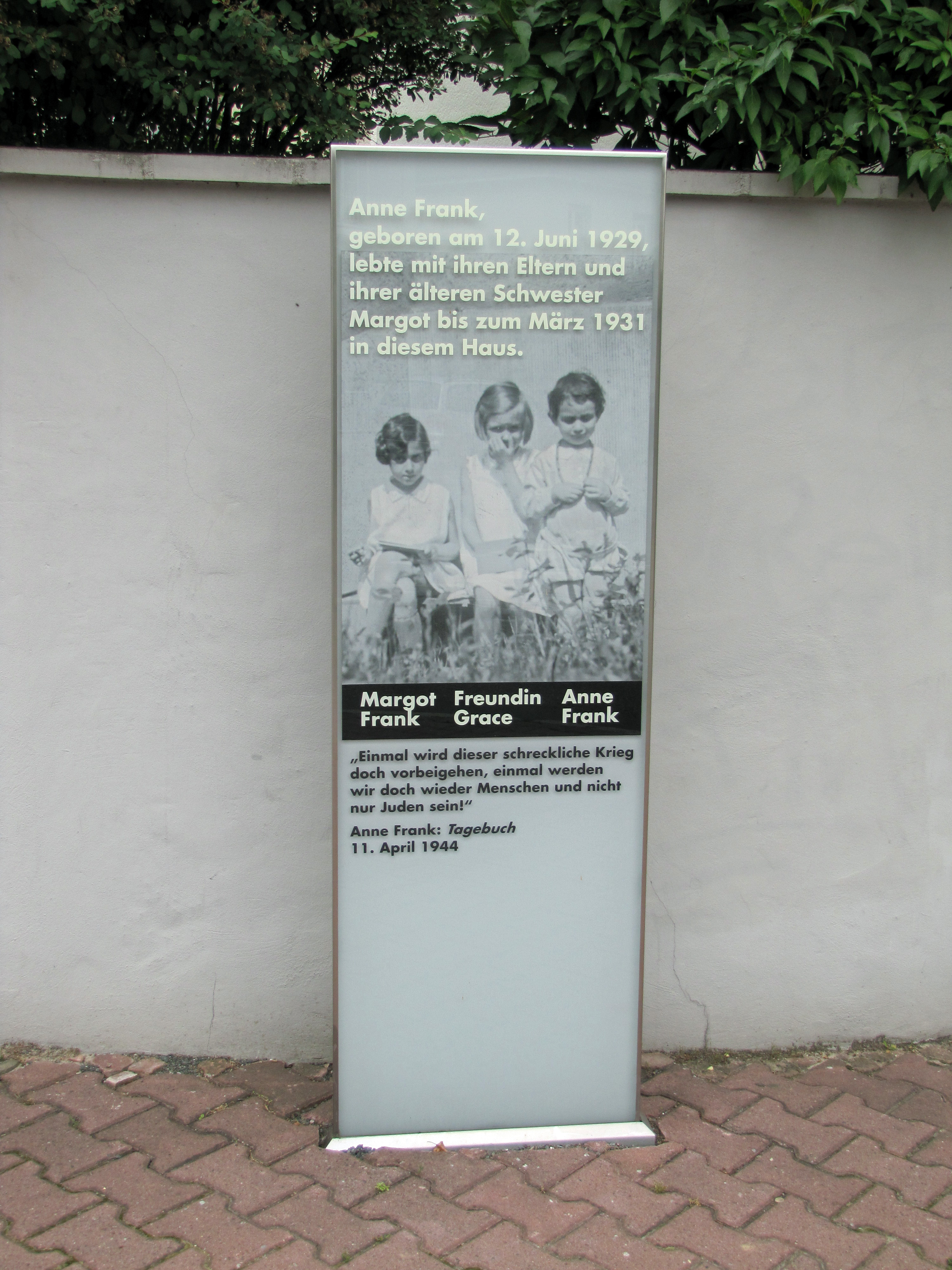

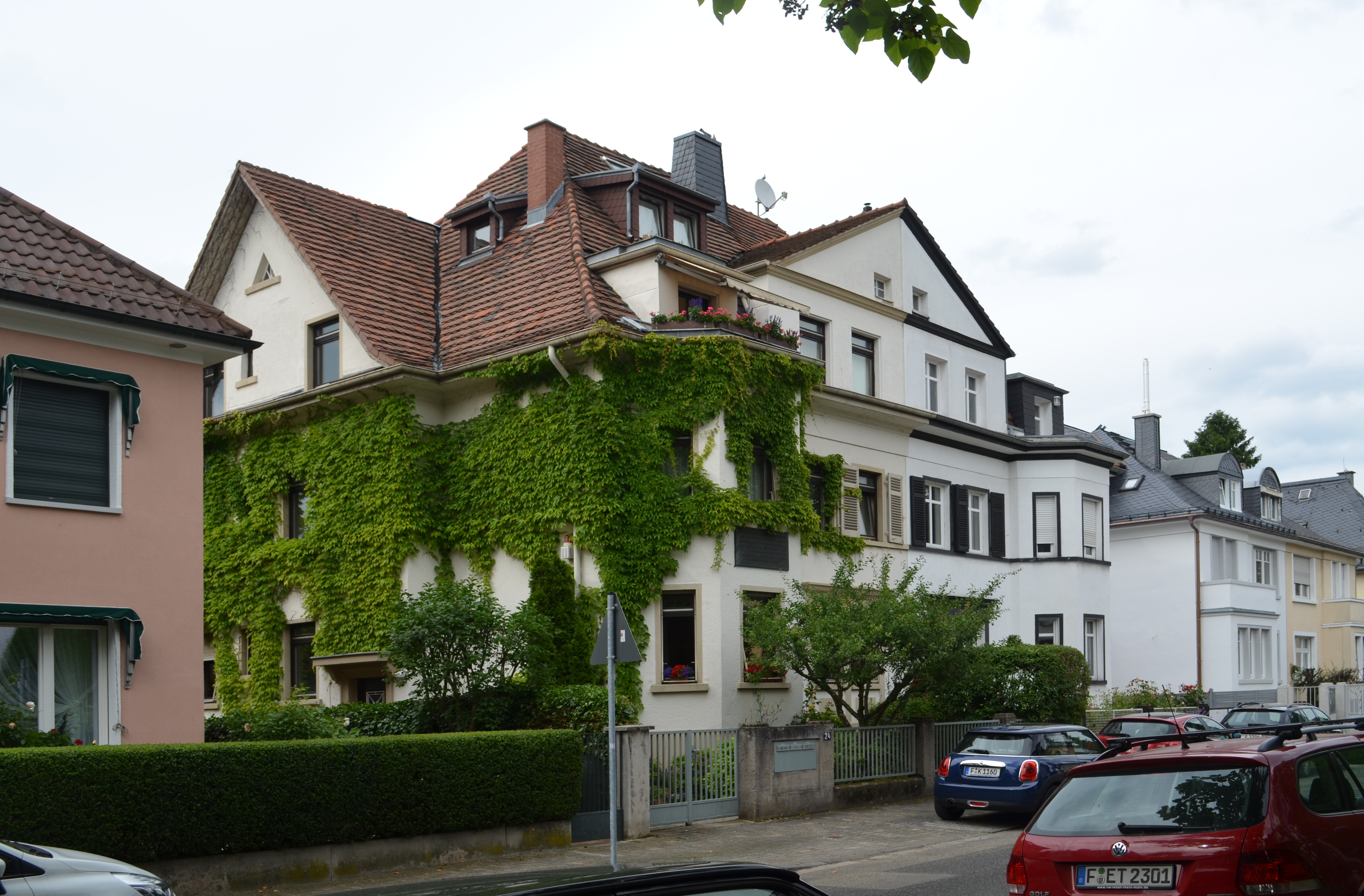
The Franks' second home (1931-1933) at Ganghoferstraße 24

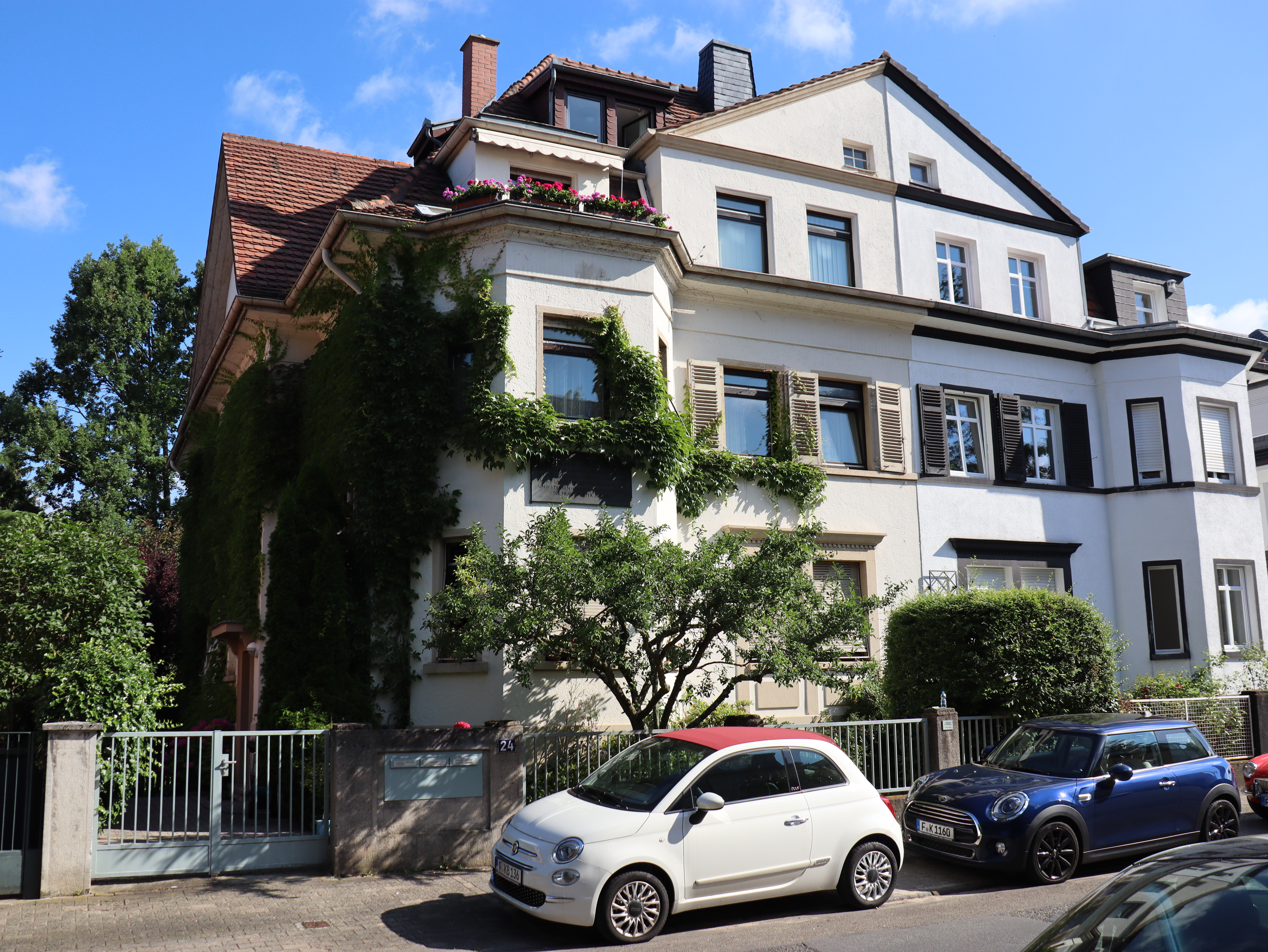

=== Marcel Reich-Ranicki ===
Marcel Reich-Ranicki, born in 1920 in Włocławek, lived at Gustav-Freytag-Straße 36, at the intersection with Fritz-Reuter-Straße, in the Poets' Quarter, west of the subway station Fritz-Tarnow-Straße, from 1974 until 2013.

== Notable residents ==
- Anne Frank
- Margot Frank
- Edith Frank (née Holländer)
- Otto Frank
- Marcel Reich-Ranicki
