= Berkersheim =

- Quarter of Frankfurt am Main
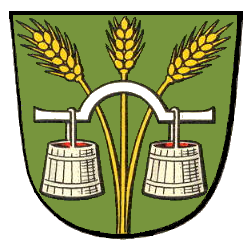
- Coat of arms

- Location of Berkersheim (red) and the Ortsbezirk Nord-Ost (light red) within Frankfurt am Main
- Interactive map of Berkersheim
- Location within Germany Location within Hesse
- Coordinates: 50°10′20″N 08°41′51″E
- Country: Germany
- State: Hesse
- Admin. region: Darmstadt
- District: Urban district
- City: Frankfurt am Main

Area
  - Total: 3.210 km^{2} (1.239 sq mi)

Population (2020-12-31)
  - Total: 3,881
  - Density: 1,209/km^{2} (3,131/sq mi)
- Time zone: UTC+01:00 (CET)
  - Summer (DST): UTC+02:00 (CEST)
- Postal codes: 60435
- Dialling codes: 069
- Vehicle registration: F
- Website: www.berkersheim.de

Berkersheim (German pronunciation: [ˈbɛʁkɐshaɪm]) is a quarter of Frankfurt am Main, Germany. It is part of the Ortsbezirk Nord-Ost.

Berkersheim had been an independent town until 1910 when it was suburbanised. It is located in the north-eastern part of Frankfurt and borders the districts of Harheim to the north, Frankfurter Berg to the west, Preungesheim and Seckbach to the south and the town of Bad Vilbel to the east.

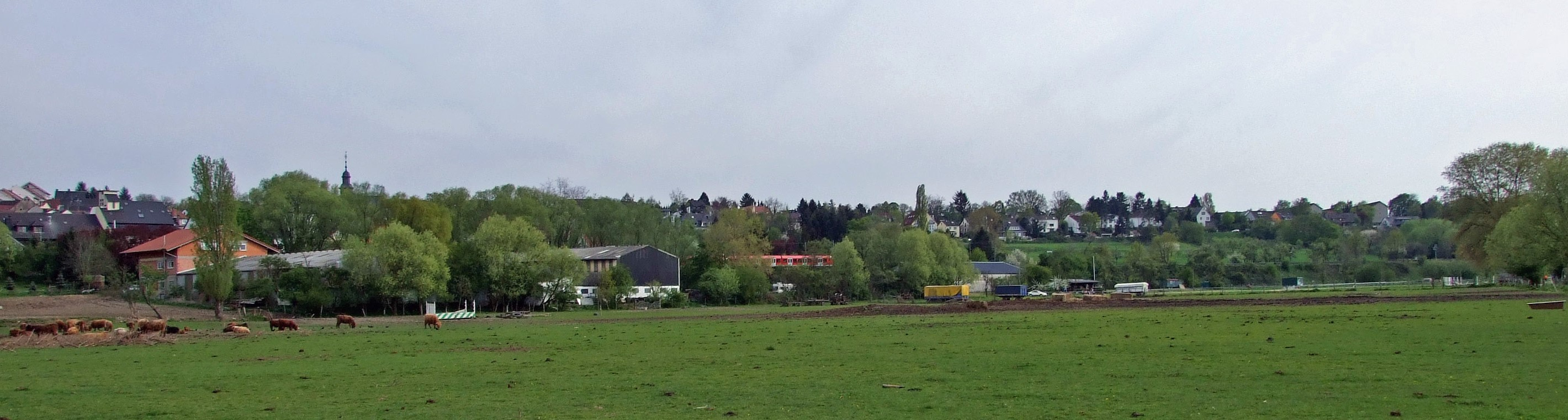
View from the Nidda River
