= Nieder-Erlenbach =

- Borough of Frankfurt am Main
- Coat of arms

- Location of Nieder-Erlenbach within Frankfurt am Main
- Interactive map of Nieder-Erlenbach
- Location within Germany Location within Hesse
- Coordinates: 50°12′11″N 08°42′32″E
- Country: Germany
- State: Hesse
- Admin. region: Darmstadt
- District: Urban district
- City: Frankfurt am Main

Area
  - Total: 8.340 km^{2} (3.220 sq mi)

Population (2020-12-31)
  - Total: 4,686
  - Density: 561.9/km^{2} (1,455/sq mi)
- Time zone: UTC+01:00 (CET)
  - Summer (DST): UTC+02:00 (CEST)
- Postal codes: 60437
- Dialling codes: 06101
- Vehicle registration: F
- Website: www.niedererlenbach.de

Nieder-Erlenbach (German pronunciation: [ˈniːdɐ ˈʔɛʁlənbax], lit. 'Lower Erlenbach') is since 1 August 1972 the northernmost borough (Ortsbezirk) of Frankfurt am Main, Germany.

The Anna-Schmidt-Schule, a private school, is located in Nieder-Erlenbach.

== Geographic location ==
Nieder-Erlenbach, founded as Haufendorf, lies in the southern foothills of the Wetterau on the same Erlenbach, right tributary of the Nidda. The Frankfurt Hauptwache (Frankfurt am Main) is about 9 kilometers away, Bad Vilbel (town hall) about 2.5 kilometers. Petterweil is 3 miles north. To Dortelweil in the east, as well as to Nieder-Erlenbach in the west about 2 km. In the southwest lies Harheim and in the southeast Massenheim - each 2 km (1,24 miles) away.

== History ==
In the year 779 Nieder-Erlenbach was first mentioned in the Lorsch Codex as Arilbach (Erlenbach): a woman named Meginburc bequeathed to the Lorsch Abbey all her property there. In addition to agricultural land, commercial buildings and residential buildings, this property also included four serfs. Nieder-Erlenbach was after this entry in Gau Wettereiba (Wetterau).

From 1376 the imperial city of Frankfurt am Main exercised the rule in Nieder-Erlenbach; the city could also appoint the mayor and administrative offices according to the right of village rule conferred by Karl IV. In 1401, the king once more expressly commanded the Nieder-Erlenbachern to obey Frankfurt. The reason of this arrangement is not known, but does not indicate great love of the villagers towards their urban rulers. As a consequence, the officials appointed by Frankfurt called themselves (at the latest from 1403) Burggrafen.

In the 17th century Nieder-Erlenbach was twice destroyed by devastating fires (1602 and 1677). After the founding of the Free City of Frankfurt, the Nieder-Erlenbacher were represented by a deputy in the Legislative Body from 1823, but only in 1853 did the villagers receive universal suffrage. In 1866 Prussia occupied the Free City of Frankfurt after the German War and in the Peace Treaty of 3 September 1866 gave Nieder-Erlenbach to the Grand Duchy of Hesse.
