= Nieder-Eschbach =

- Borough of Frankfurt am Main
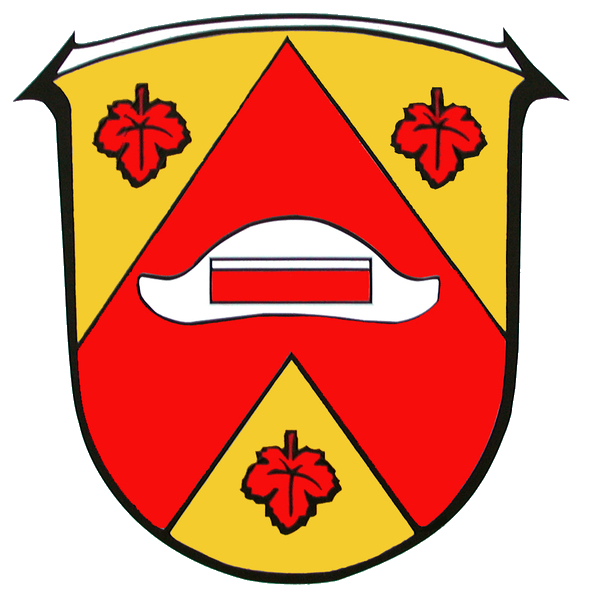
- Coat of arms

- Location of Nieder-Eschbach within Frankfurt am Main
- Interactive map of Nieder-Eschbach
- Location within Germany Location within Hesse
- Coordinates: 50°12′23″N 08°39′51″E
- Country: Germany
- State: Hesse
- Admin. region: Darmstadt
- District: Urban district
- City: Frankfurt am Main

Area
  - Total: 6.350 km^{2} (2.452 sq mi)

Population (2020-12-31)
  - Total: 11,462
  - Density: 1,805/km^{2} (4,675/sq mi)
- Time zone: UTC+01:00 (CET)
  - Summer (DST): UTC+02:00 (CEST)
- Postal codes: 60437
- Dialling codes: 069
- Vehicle registration: F
- Website: www.niedereschbach.de

Nieder-Eschbach (German pronunciation: [ˈniːdɐ ˈʔɛʃbax], lit. 'Lower Eschbach') is a borough (Ortsbezirk) of Frankfurt am Main, Germany. After 1465 Nieder-Eschbach belonged to the Archbishopric of Mainz. Ecclesiastical Middle Authority was the Archdeacon of the provost of St. Peter in Mainz.

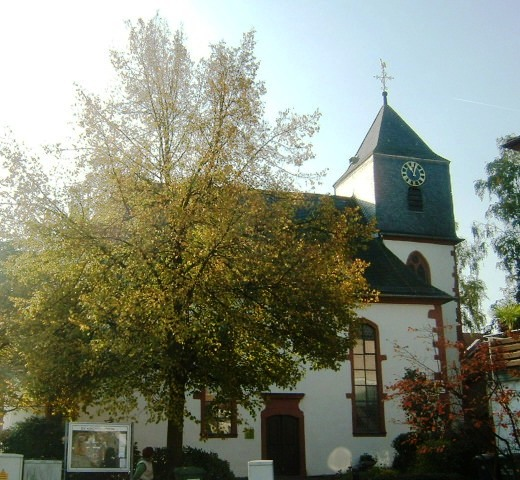
Protestant church

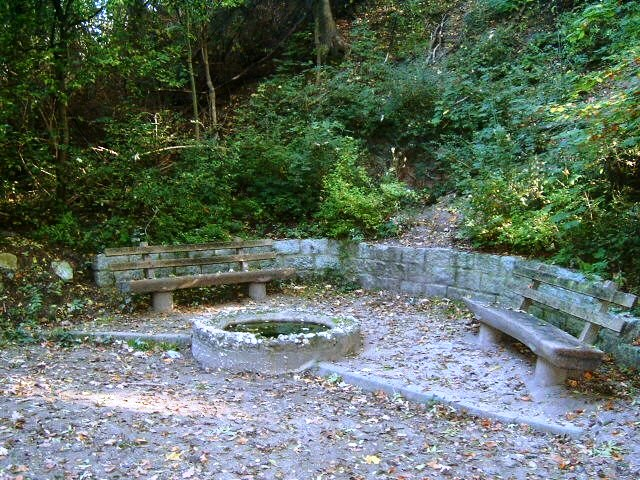
A well on the Pfingstberg

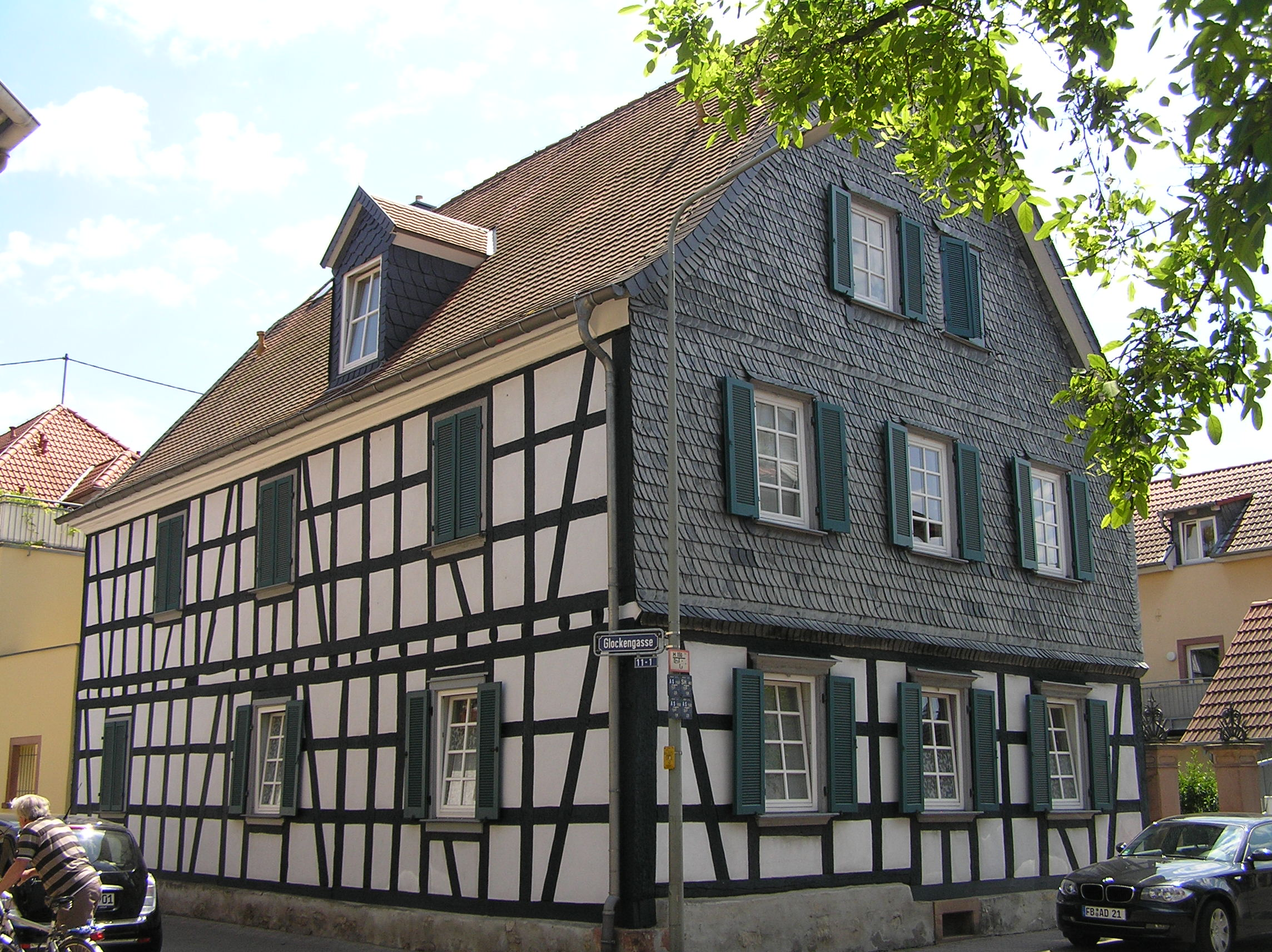
Timber-framed house

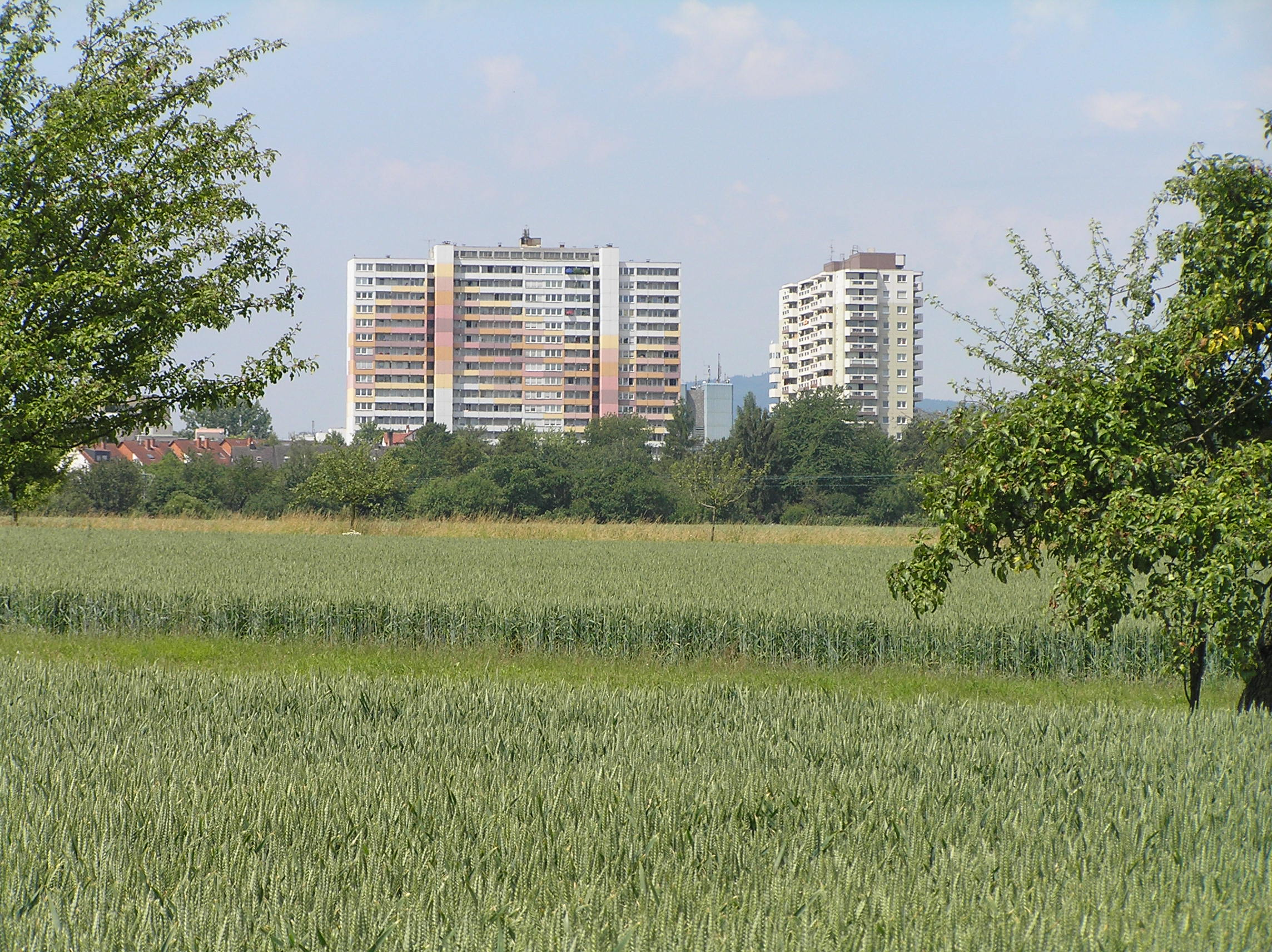
Apartment buildings seen from Harheim
