= Bockenheim (Frankfurt am Main) =

Quarter of Frankfurt am Main in Hesse, Germany

- Quarter of Frankfurt am Main
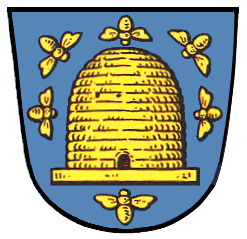
- Coat of arms

- Location of Bockenheim (red) and the Ortsbezirk Innenstadt II (light red) within Frankfurt am Main
- Interactive map of Bockenheim
- Location within Germany Location within Hesse
- Coordinates: 50°07′26″N 08°38′21″E
- Country: Germany
- State: Hesse
- Admin. region: Darmstadt
- District: Urban district
- City: Frankfurt am Main

Area
  - Total: 5,401 km^{2} (2,085 sq mi)

Population (2020-12-31)
  - Total: 42,140
  - Density: 7.802/km^{2} (20.21/sq mi)
- Time zone: UTC+01:00 (CET)
  - Summer (DST): UTC+02:00 (CEST)
- Postal codes: 60486, 60487
- Dialling codes: 069
- Vehicle registration: F
- Website: www.frankfurt.de

Bockenheim (German pronunciation: [ˈbɔkn̩haɪm]) is a quarter of Frankfurt, Germany. It was incorporated into Frankfurt on 1 April 1895 and is part of the Ortsbezirk Innenstadt II.

Bockenheim lies west of central Frankfurt and is the third largest district by population in Frankfurt after Sachsenhausen and the Nordend, with approximately 42,000 inhabitants.

Bockenheim is bordered by the Goethe University, the Senckenberg museum and the Frankfurt Trade Fair in the south. The Bockenheimer Depot was the central tram depot, built around 1900, which is now a theatre, a venue of the Städtische Bühnen Frankfurt. Bockenheim also houses the headquarters of the Deutsche Bundesbank.
