= SV Viktoria Preußen 07 =

German football club

SV Viktoria Preußen
- Full name: Sportvereine Viktoria Preußen 07 e.V. Frankfurt am Main
- Founded: 1907
- League: Kreisoberliga Frankfurt (VIII)
- 2018–19: 10th
Home colours	Away colours

SV Viktoria Preußen is a German association football club based in the Eckenheim district of Frankfurt.

== History ==
The club was founded on 6 May 1907 and was built around the sports of rings and weightlifting. A football department was formed in 1909 and became independent as Fußballvereins 1912 Eckenheim three years later. The two associations maintained good relations and, following the end of World War I in 1919, reunited as SV Viktoria 07/12 Eckenheim. The unified club went on to enjoy considerable success at the local level.

Following the rise to power of the Nazis in 1933, sport in Germany became highly politicized and clubs deemed unreliable by the regime were broken up. This was the fate of many worker's clubs including Freie Turnerschaft Nord und Kamerun, many of whose members joined Viktoria. This led to the formation of gymnastics and handball departments in the now much larger club. After World War II, occupying Allied authorities ordered the dissolution of most organizations in the country, including sports and football associations, as part of the process of de-Nazification. The former membership of Viktoria became part of a larger local sports organization known as Sportfreunde Eckenheim, but were soon pushing to regain their independence as a separate side. In March 1946, they formed a new union with Jahnvolk Eckenheim to create Sportgemeinde Eckenheim.

The club was re-shaped in the period following the war and on into the early 1960s with new departments being created and others leaving to form separate associations. The youth football section grew steadily and was quite successful leading to the formation of Sportclub Eckenheim in 1963. SG Eckenheim in the meantime resumed its traditional identity as Viktoria 07.

The present day club was formed out of the 1965 merger of Viktoria and FC Preußen, itself created out of the worker's club of railway catering company Mitropa in 1951. The football team competed on the local city circuit Bezirksliga Frankfurt/Mitte (IX) through the 90s before advancing to the Bezirksoberliga Frankfurt/West (VIII) in 2005, but then falling back to the Bezirksliga, which was renamed Kreisoberliga in 2008, where they played until 2009, when they earned promotion to the Gruppenliga Frankfurt. The club dropped back to the Kreisoberliga for the 2010–11 season but won the league and were promoted once more. The club played in the Gruppenliga until 2014 when it was relegated back to the Kreisoberliga.

== Honors ==
- Kreisoberliga Frankfurt (VIII)
  - Champions: 2009, 2011
