= List of Ortsbezirke of Frankfurt am Main =

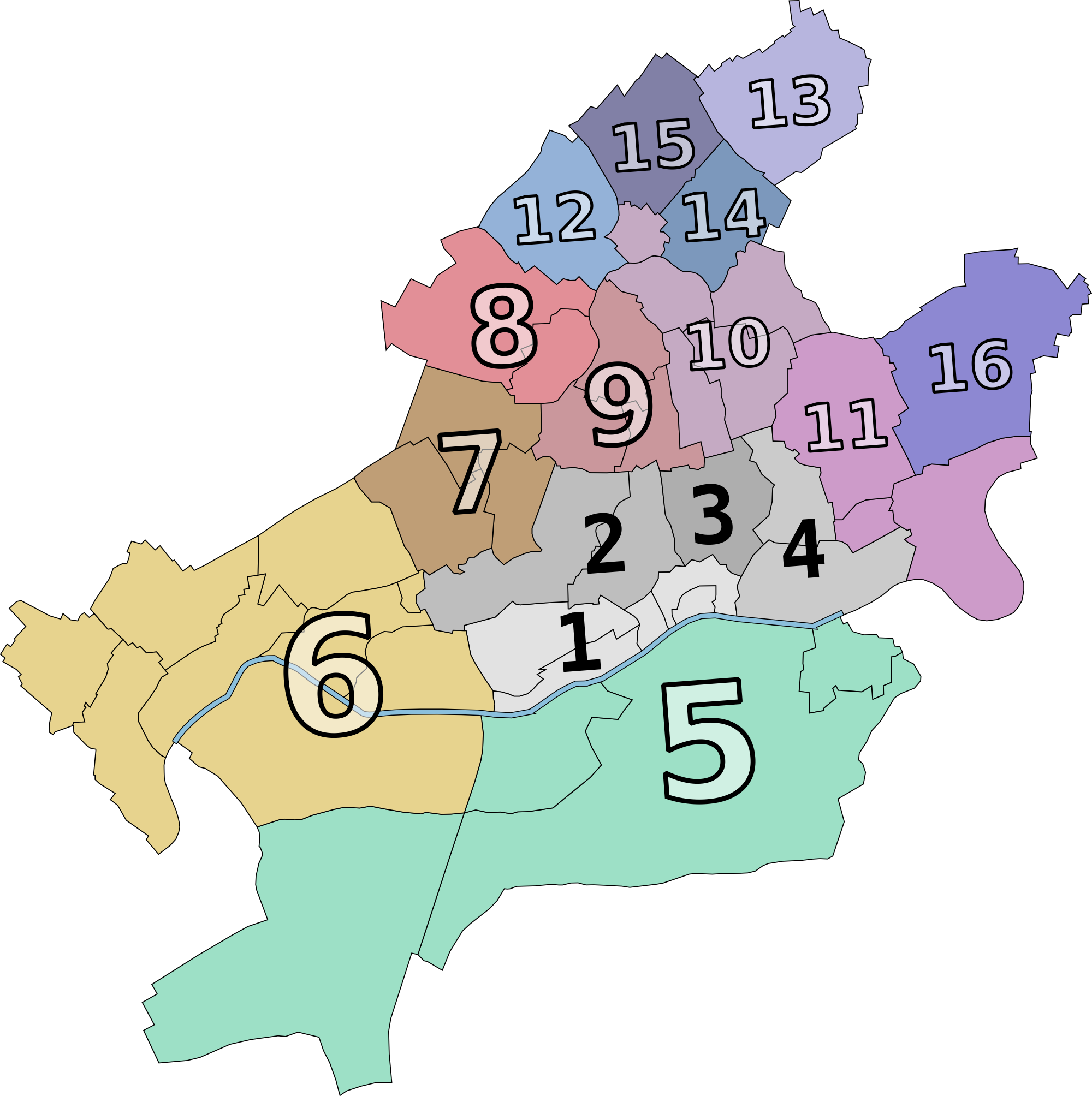
The 16 Ortsbezirke of Frankfurt

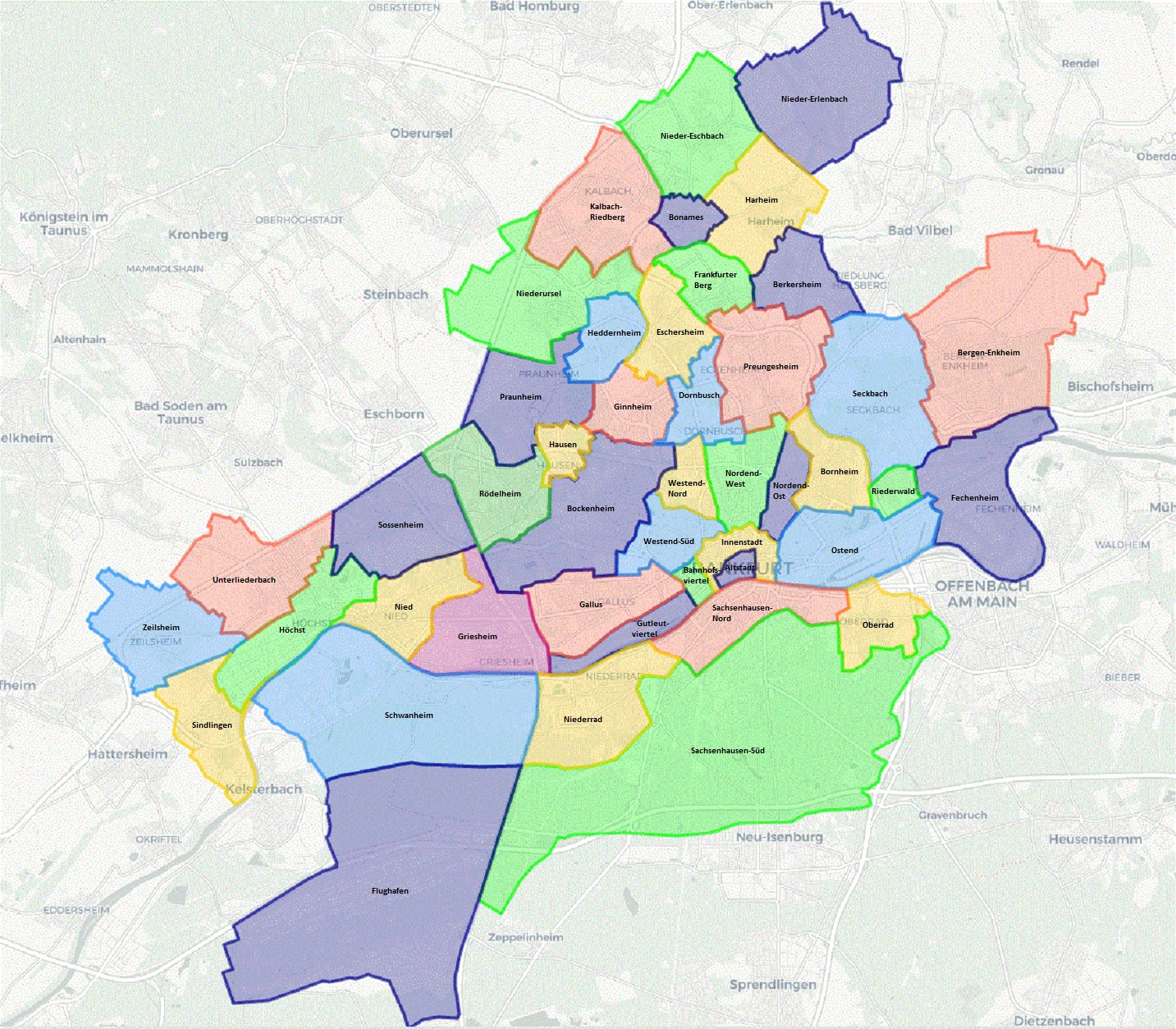
The 46 city districts of Frankfurt

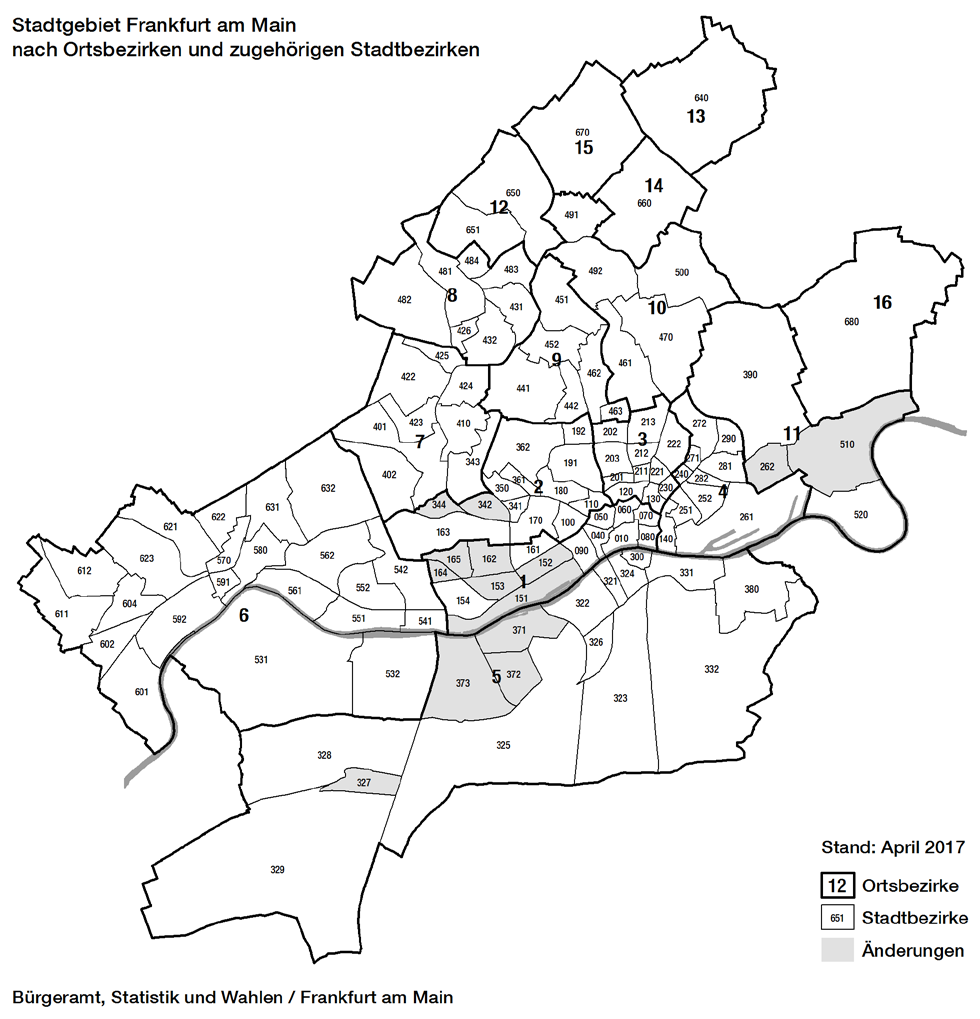
Frankfurt am Main nach "Ortsbezirken" und "zugehörigen Stadtbezirke" im Jahr 2020

An Ortsbezirk is an administrative division of the city of Frankfurt in Germany, and other towns in Hesse and Rhineland-Palatinate.

Frankfurt comprises 16 Ortsbezirke which are subdivided into 46 quarters or city districts. While Frankfurt citizens identify themselves more with the city district they live in, Ortsbezirke are the highest political divisions of the city. Each Ortsbezirk has a district committee and chairperson.

== List ==
The 16 Ortsbezirke of Frankfurt are:

No.	Name	City districts	Population	Area (km^{2})	Population density (Population/km^{2})
1	Innenstadt I	Altstadt, Bahnhofsviertel, Gallus, Gutleutviertel, Innenstadt	44,183	8.987	4,916
2	Innenstadt II	Bockenheim, Westend-Nord, Westend-Süd	57,629	9.493	6,071
3	Innenstadt III	Nordend-Ost, Nordend-West	51,671	4.744	10,892
4	Bornheim/Ostend	Ostend, Bornheim	56,723	9.212	6,158
5	Süd	Flughafen, Niederrad, Oberrad, Sachsenhausen-Süd, Sachsenhausen-Nord	91,662	84.831	1,081
6	West	Griesheim, Höchst, Nied, Schwanheim, Sindlingen, Sossenheim, Unterliederbach, Zeilsheim	125,057	51.656	2,421
7	Mitte-West	Rödelheim, Praunheim, Hausen	38,919	10.956	3,552
8	Nord-West	Niederursel, Heddernheim	35,961	10.511	3,421
9	Mitte-Nord	Eschersheim, Ginnheim, Dornbusch	49,616	8.441	5,878
10	Nord-Ost	Eckenheim, Preungesheim, Berkersheim, Frankfurter Berg, Bonames	44,180	12.540	3,523
11	Ost	Seckbach, Riederwald, Fechenheim	31,068	16.255	1,911
12	Kalbach-Riedberg	Kalbach-Riedberg	7,882	6.904	1,142
13	Nieder-Erlenbach	Nieder-Erlenbach	4,583	8.336	550
14	Harheim	Harheim	4,155	5.022	827
15	Nieder-Eschbach	Nieder-Eschbach	11,487	6.351	1,809 (ww)
16	Bergen-Enkheim	Bergen-Enkheim	17,891	12.541	1,427
