= Oberrad =

- Quarter of Frankfurt am Main
- Coat of arms

- Location of Oberrad (red) and the Ortsbezirk Süd (light red) within Frankfurt am Main
- Interactive map of Oberrad
- Location within Germany Location within Hesse
- Coordinates: 50°06′02″N 08°43′27″E
- Country: Germany
- State: Hesse
- Admin. region: Darmstadt
- District: Urban district
- City: Frankfurt am Main

Area
  - Total: 2.745 km^{2} (1.060 sq mi)

Population (2020-12-31)
  - Total: 13,648
  - Density: 4,972/km^{2} (12,880/sq mi)
- Time zone: UTC+01:00 (CET)
  - Summer (DST): UTC+02:00 (CEST)
- Postal codes: 60599
- Dialling codes: 069
- Vehicle registration: F
- Website: www.oberrad.de

Oberrad (German pronunciation: [ˈoːbɐˌʁaːt]) is a quarter of Frankfurt am Main, Germany. It is part of the Ortsbezirk Süd.

To the north of the district lies the River Main. Beyond it, the Eastern Harbor (Osthafen) of Frankfurt in the Ostend borough. To the northeast, Oberrad is bordered by Offenbach's Kaiserlei district, to the south and west lie parts of Frankfurt-Sachsenhausen.
