= Bernger von Horheim =

12th-century Rhenish composer

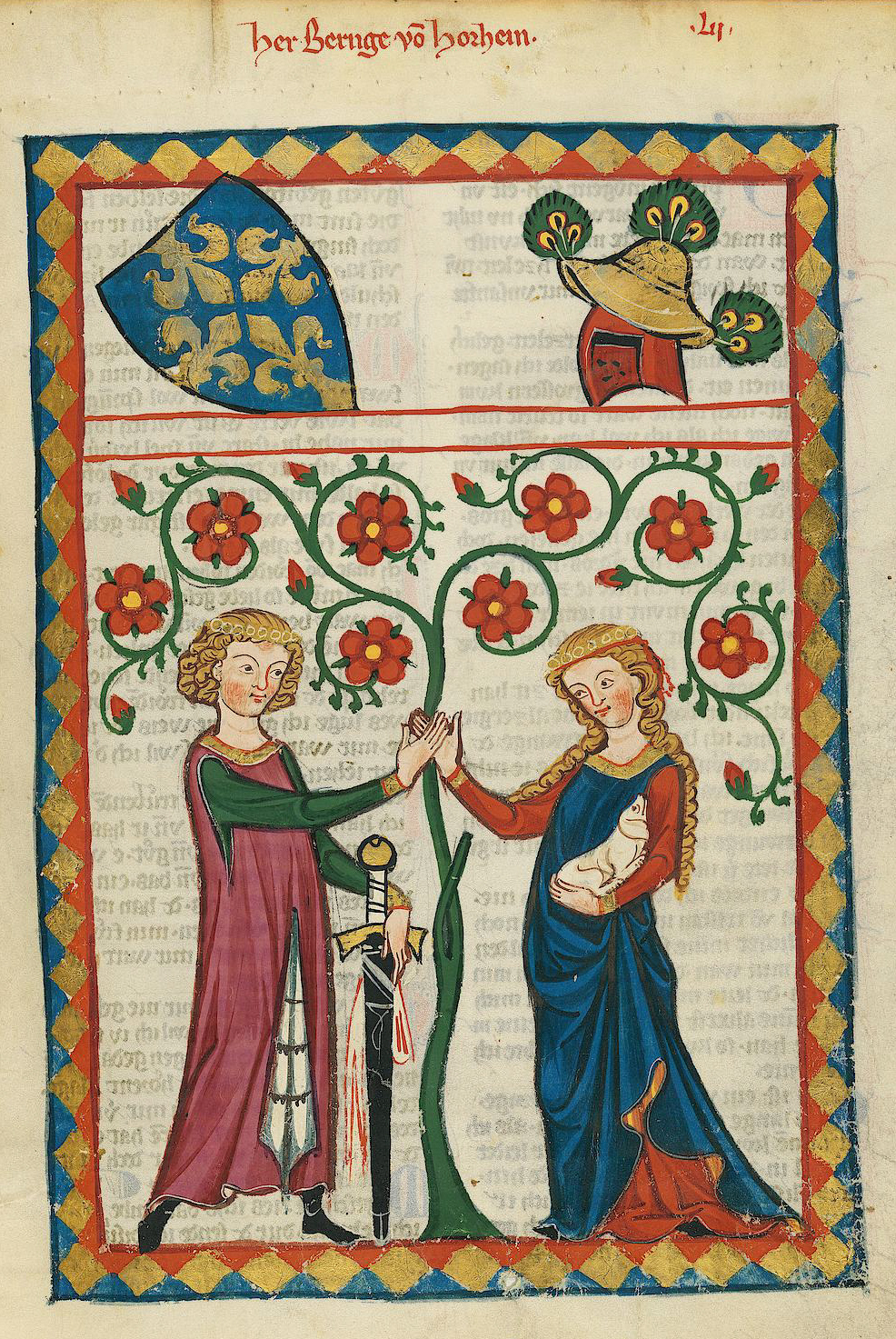
Illuminated manuscript miniature by Bergner von Horheim in the Codex Manesse (early fourteenth century)

Bernger von Horheim was a Rhenish Minnesänger of the late twelfth century. He wrote in the tradition of courtly love and was influenced by Friedrich von Hausen.

Bernger may originate from Horrheim in Vaihingen an der Enz. Another possibility is Harheim near Frankfurt. A Berengerius de Orehem is recorded in Italy in 1196 with Philip of Swabia, probably participating in the campaign of Emperor Henry VI in Apulia. A Ritterklage in Bernger's fourth song may refer to this campaign.

Six of Bernger's songs, seventeen stanzas in total, are recorded in the Codex Manesse. Thirteen of these stanzas (all except songs V and VI) are also found in the Weingartner Liederhandschrift. His songs are predominantly Minneklagen, though song II has been called a Lügenlied (lying song). In each of its four strophes Bernger sings of happiness and fulfilled love before ending with the claim that he was lying. This song type was later adopted by Tannhäuser and Der Marner.

Bernger's debt to Chrétien de Troyes is evident in his treatment of Tristan and Iseult and the Matter of Britain.
