= Gutleutviertel =

- Quarter of Frankfurt am Main
- Location of the Gutleutviertel (red) and the Ortsbezirk Innenstadt I (light red) within Frankfurt am Main
- Interactive map of Gutleutviertel
- Location within Germany Location within Hesse
- Coordinates: 50°06′06″N 08°39′34″E
- Country: Germany
- State: Hesse
- Admin. region: Darmstadt
- District: Urban district
- City: Frankfurt am Main

Area
  - Total: 2.257 km^{2} (0.871 sq mi)

Population (2020-12-31)
  - Total: 6,786
  - Density: 3,007/km^{2} (7,787/sq mi)
- Time zone: UTC+01:00 (CET)
  - Summer (DST): UTC+02:00 (CEST)
- Postal codes: 60327, 60329
- Dialling codes: 069
- Vehicle registration: F
- Website: www.gutleutviertel.de

The Gutleutviertel (German pronunciation: [ˈɡuːtlɔʏtˌfɪʁtl̩]) is a quarter of Frankfurt am Main, Germany. It is part of the Ortsbezirk Innenstadt I.

The name Gutleut originates from the "Gutleuthof", once a refuge for lepers hosted by the "fraternity of the good people".

The former working class district has spruced up considerably in recent years with the development of a new housing and business district at the former West Harbor.
