= Friedrich von Hausen =

12th-century German poet

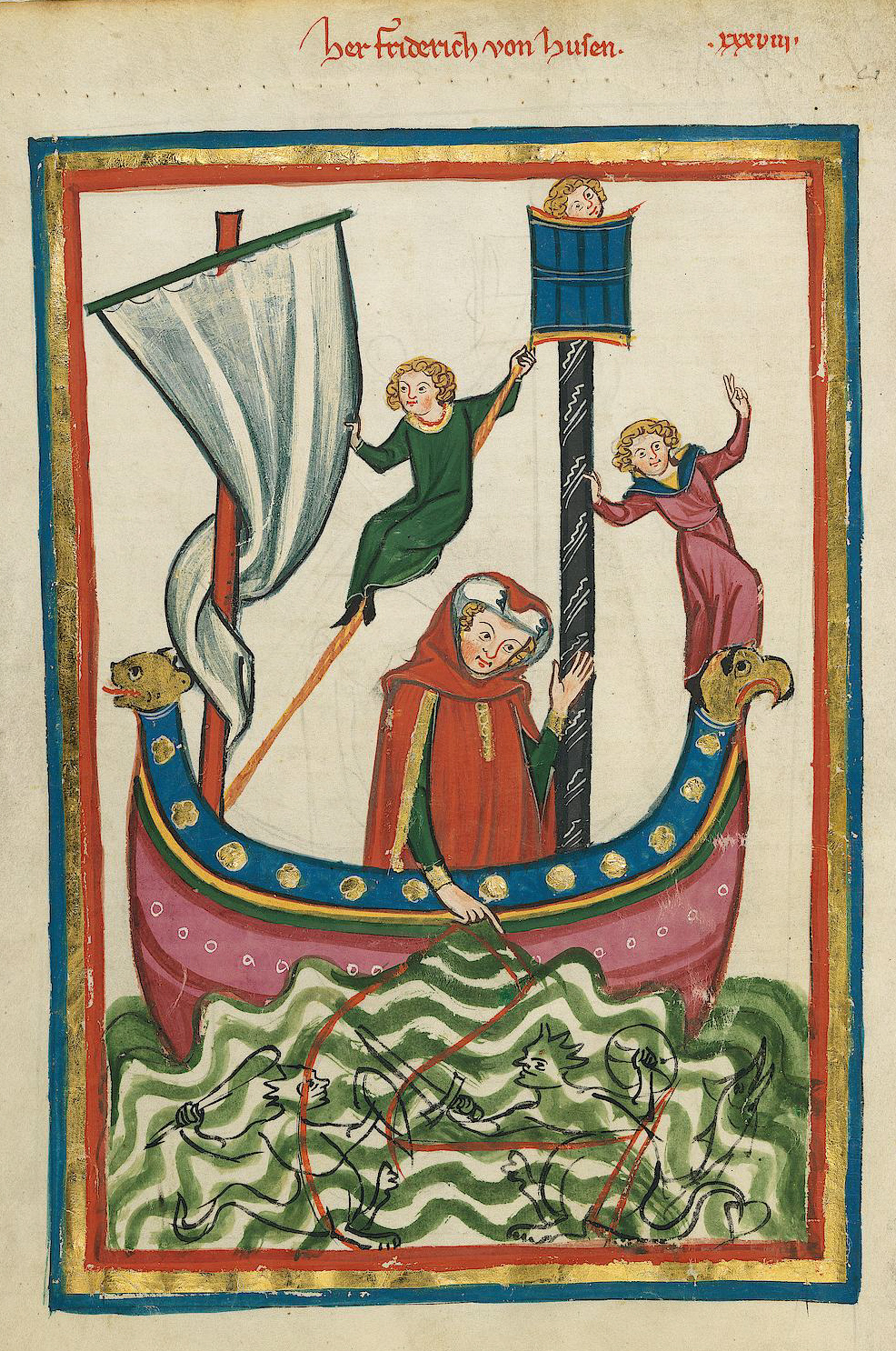
Friedrich von Hausen (Codex Manesse, 14th century)

Friedrich von Hausen (Middle High German: Friderich von Hûsen) was a medieval German poet, one of the earliest of the Minnesingers; born sometime between 1150–60; d. 6 May 1190.

== Life ==
His name is mentioned frequently in legal documents, for the first time in one from Mainz dated 1171 by Christian I, Archbishop of Mainz. He was born in middle Rhenish territory, as is shown by his dialect, especially by his rhymes, but several towns claim to be his birthplace, and the question cannot be definitely decided. In 1175 he was in Italy, and again in 1186 in the suite of Henry VI, Holy Roman Emperor. The next year he was present when Frederick I, Barbarossa and Philip Augustus met between Mouzon and Yvois, and in 1188 he was at Worms in the company of Baldwin V, Count of Hainaut. He accompanied the Emperor Frederick, by whom he was held in high esteem, on the Third Crusade in 1189, and met his death at the battle of Philomelium (modern-day Akşehir, Turkey), when he fell with his horse while pursuing the enemy. The whole army is said to have mourned his death.

== Songs ==
Friedrich von Hausen is one of the earliest of the minnesingers who are known to have imitated French models, with which he became acquainted on his travels through Burgundy and Provence. Together with Heinrich von Veldeke he introduced the Romance element into the minnesong. The Provençal influence is especially evident in the dactylic rhythm of his verses, which resulted from the adoption into German of a Romance ten-syllable line with four or five stresses. His rhymes are still occasionally imperfect and his songs contain more than one strophe. Hausen's poetry is rather artificial in form and often abstruse in spirit. He is fond of dallying with a word. Like most of the troubadours or minnesingers he sings chiefly of troubled love. He directly influenced Bernger von Horheim.

== Editions ==
- Friedrich von Hausen, Lieder. Mittelhochdeutsch/Neuhochdeutch. Text, translation and commentary by Günther Schweikle (Reclam, 1984) ISBN 3-15-008023-1
- Lachmann, Karl; Haupt, Moritz; Vogt, Friedrich, eds. (1888). "VII: Her Friderich von Husen". Des Minnesangs Frühling (4 ed.). Leipzig: Hirzel. pp. 42-55.
- Moser, Hugo; Tervooren, Helmut, eds. (1988). "X: Friedrich von Hausen". Des Minnesangs Frühling. Vol. I: Texts (38 ed.). Stuttgart: Hirzel. pp. 73–96. ISBN 3777604488.
- Mowatt, D.G. (1971). Friderich von Hûsen. Introduction, Text, Commentary and Glossary. Cambridge: Cambridge University Press. ISBN 0-521-07888-1.

== Notes ==
- Schweikle G (1989). "Friedrich von Hausen". In Ruh K, Keil G, Schröder W (eds.). Die deutsche Literatur des Mittelalters. Verfasserlexikon. Vol. 2. Berlin, New York: Walter De Gruyter. cols 935–947. ISBN 978-3-11-022248-7.
