= Frankfurter Berg =

- Quarter of Frankfurt am Main
- Location of Frankfurter Berg (red) and the Ortsbezirk Nord-Ost (light red) within Frankfurt am Main
- Interactive map of Frankfurter Berg
- Location within Germany Location within Hesse
- Coordinates: 50°10′21″N 08°40′43″E
- Country: Germany
- State: Hesse
- Admin. region: Darmstadt
- District: Urban district
- City: Frankfurt am Main

Area
  - Total: 2.185 km^{2} (0.844 sq mi)

Population (2020-12-31)
  - Total: 8,225
  - Density: 3,764/km^{2} (9,749/sq mi)
- Time zone: UTC+01:00 (CET)
  - Summer (DST): UTC+02:00 (CEST)
- Postal codes: 60433
- Dialling codes: 069
- Vehicle registration: F
- Website: www.frankfurterberg.de

Frankfurter Berg (German pronunciation: [ˈfʁaŋkfʊʁtɐ ˈbɛʁk]) is a quarter of Frankfurt am Main, Germany, situated on a hill above the river Nidda. It is part of the Ortsbezirk Nord-Ost.
