= Sachsenhausen (Frankfurt am Main) =

City district in Germany

Sachsenhausen-Nord Sachsenhausen-Süd
- Quarter of Frankfurt am Main
- Location of Sachsenhausen (red) and the Ortsbezirk Süd (light red) within Frankfurt am Main
- Interactive map of Sachsenhausen-Nord; Sachsenhausen-Süd
- Location within Germany Location within Hesse
- Coordinates: 50°06′23″N 08°41′15″E
- Country: Germany
- State: Hesse
- Admin. region: Darmstadt
- District: Urban district
- City: Frankfurt am Main

Area
  - Total: 39.14 km^{2} (15.11 sq mi)

Population (2020-12-31)
  - Total: 61,987
  - Density: 1,584/km^{2} (4,102/sq mi)
- Time zone: UTC+01:00 (CET)
  - Summer (DST): UTC+02:00 (CEST)
- Postal codes: 60594, 60596, 60598, 60599
- Dialling codes: 069
- Vehicle registration: F
- Website: www.sachsenhausen.de/

Sachsenhausen-Nord (German pronunciation: [zaksn̩ˈhaʊzn̩ ˈnɔʁt]) and Sachsenhausen-Süd ([- ˈzyːt]) are two quarters of Frankfurt am Main, Germany. The division into a northern and a southern part is mostly for administrative purposes as Sachsenhausen is generally considered a single entity. Both city districts are part of the Ortsbezirk Süd.

As a whole, Sachsenhausen is the largest district by population and area in Frankfurt. It is located south of the Main river and borders the districts of Niederrad and Flughafen to the west and Oberrad to the east. Sachsenhausen-Süd consists mostly of the Frankfurt City Forest.

Sachsenhausen was founded as Frankfurt's bridgehead in the 12th century. The oldest documents point to the year 1193. Unlike Frankfurt's own historic city center (the Altstadt) which burned to the ground after British bombing in 1944, Sachsenhausen's old town is partly preserved. The Frankfurt youth hostel is located on its riverside. The population of Sachsenhausen is 55,422.

The River Main embankment is the location of the city's largest flea market and some of Germany's best-known museums; it is also called the Museum Embankment (or Museumsufer). This is where the annual Museum-Embankment-Festival / Night of the Museums (or Museumsuferfest / Nacht der Museen) is held. During the event all the museums are open throughout the night, there are discounted entrance fees, and there are many open-air events in the streets. Sachsenhausen is known for its vibrant nightlife with over two dozen bars, taverns and restaurants in the southern part's old town.

The main street of Sachsenhausen is the Schweizer Straße, a cosmopolitan boulevard with bars and two of Frankfurt's most traditional cider houses, Zum gemalten Haus and Wagner. Ciderhouses that produce their own Apfelwein (apple wine) can be identified by the presence of a wreath of evergreen branches hanging outside the location or a similar image included on their signpost. The Textorstraße and the old town or Altstadt have the best known ciderhouses in Frankfurt, but such pubs can be found all over southern Hesse. Orchards of the Sperling apple can be seen across the countryside and, reputedly, local law requires that Apfelwein be the cheapest alcoholic beverage on sale in any public house.

In addition, there is a newer part of Sachsenhausen, built on the grounds of the old slaughterhouse area. The area is located on the south bank of the Main, directly opposite the seat of the European Central Bank on the other side of the river.

Landmarks of Sachsenhausen include the Henninger Turm and the Goetheturm.

Sachsenhausen is also the location of the Sankt Georgen Graduate School of Philosophy and Theology.

== Transport links ==
Long distance trains in Frankfurt (Main) Süd station

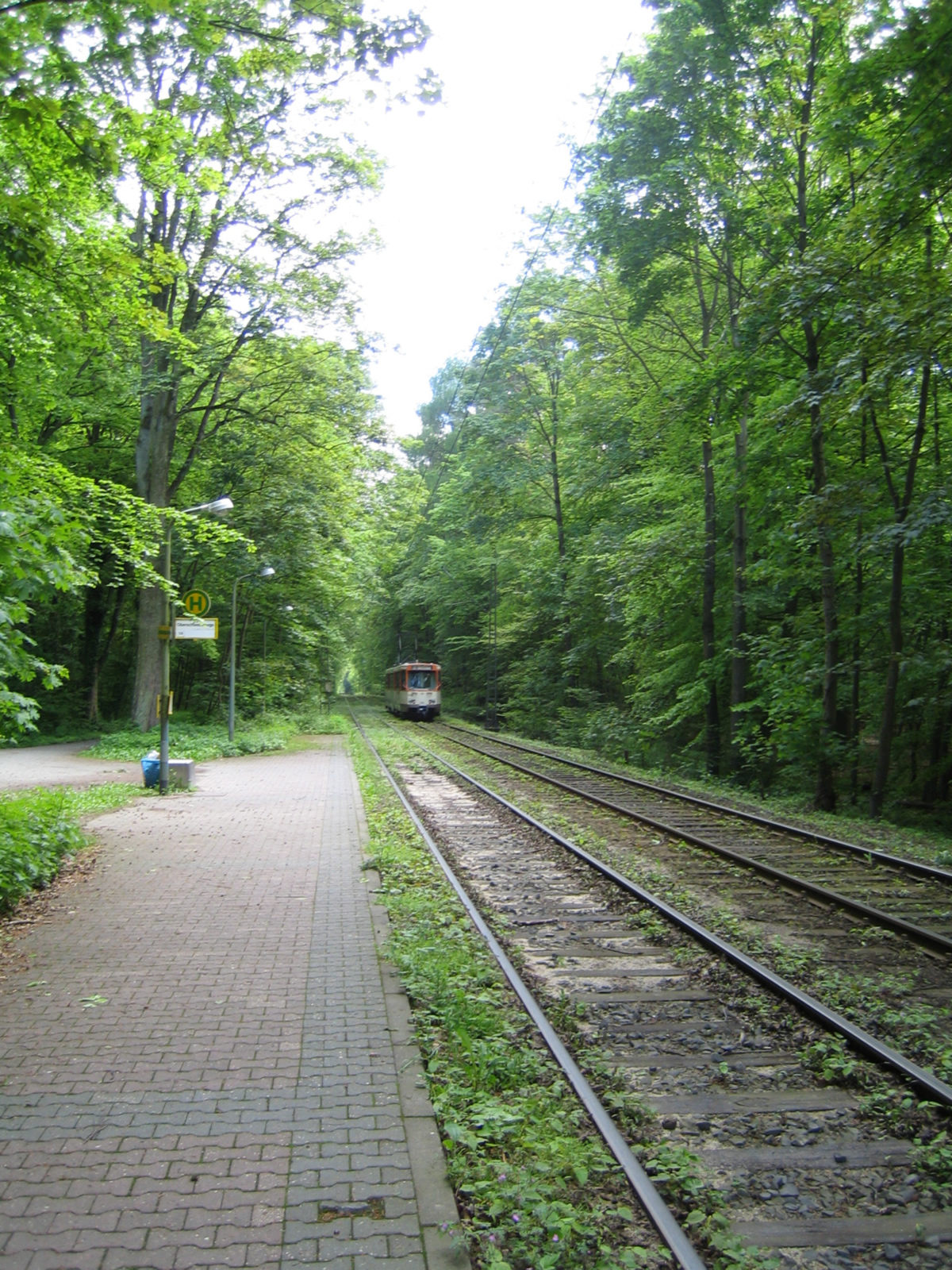
Oberschweinstiege station of tram line 17 (Rebstockbad - Neu Isenburg Stadtgrenze is located in the forest next to Frankfurt

Sachsenhausen district locats one of three train stations in Frankfurt served by long distance trsins as well, which is Frankfurt (Main) Süd station. This station is served by Flixtrain, Nightjet as well as RE, RB, suburban trains, U-Bahn, tram and city buses. Tram lines 14, 15, 16, 17 and 18 run through the district as well as many city bus lines, including metrobuses.

== Gallery ==
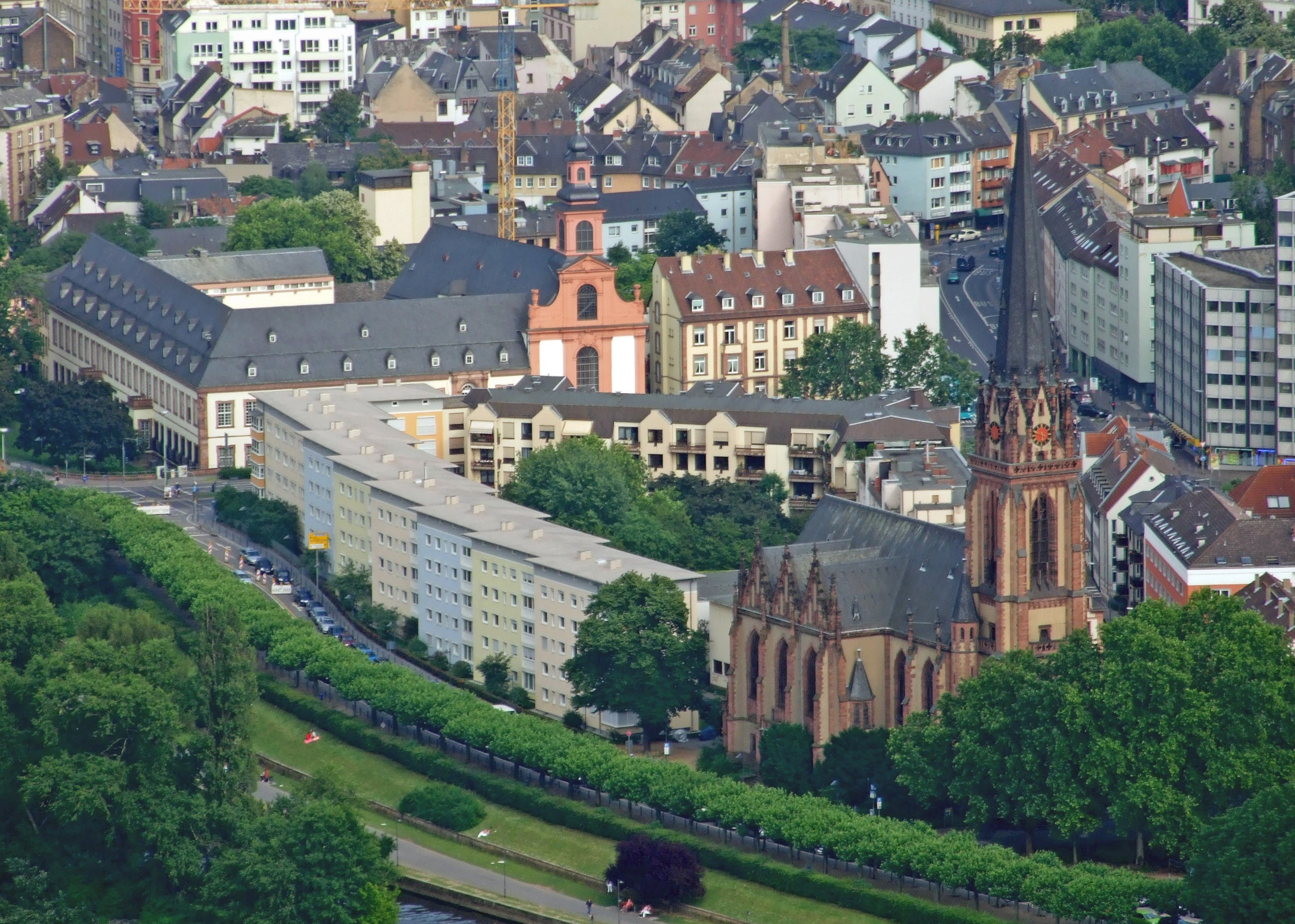
Museumsufer (Museum riverside) part I, with Dreikönigskirche

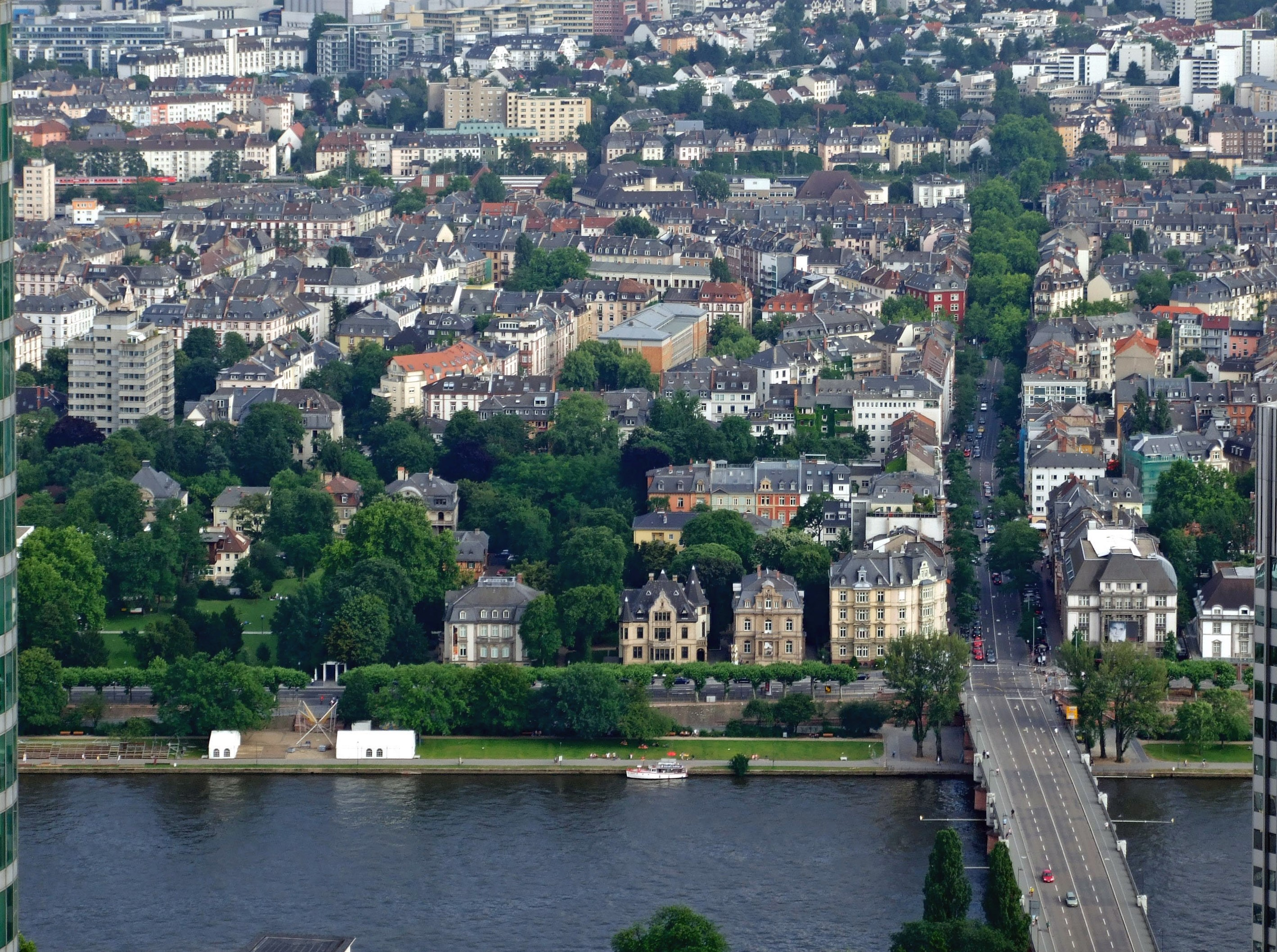
Part II, with Untermainbrücke (bridge) and Schweizer Straße straight on

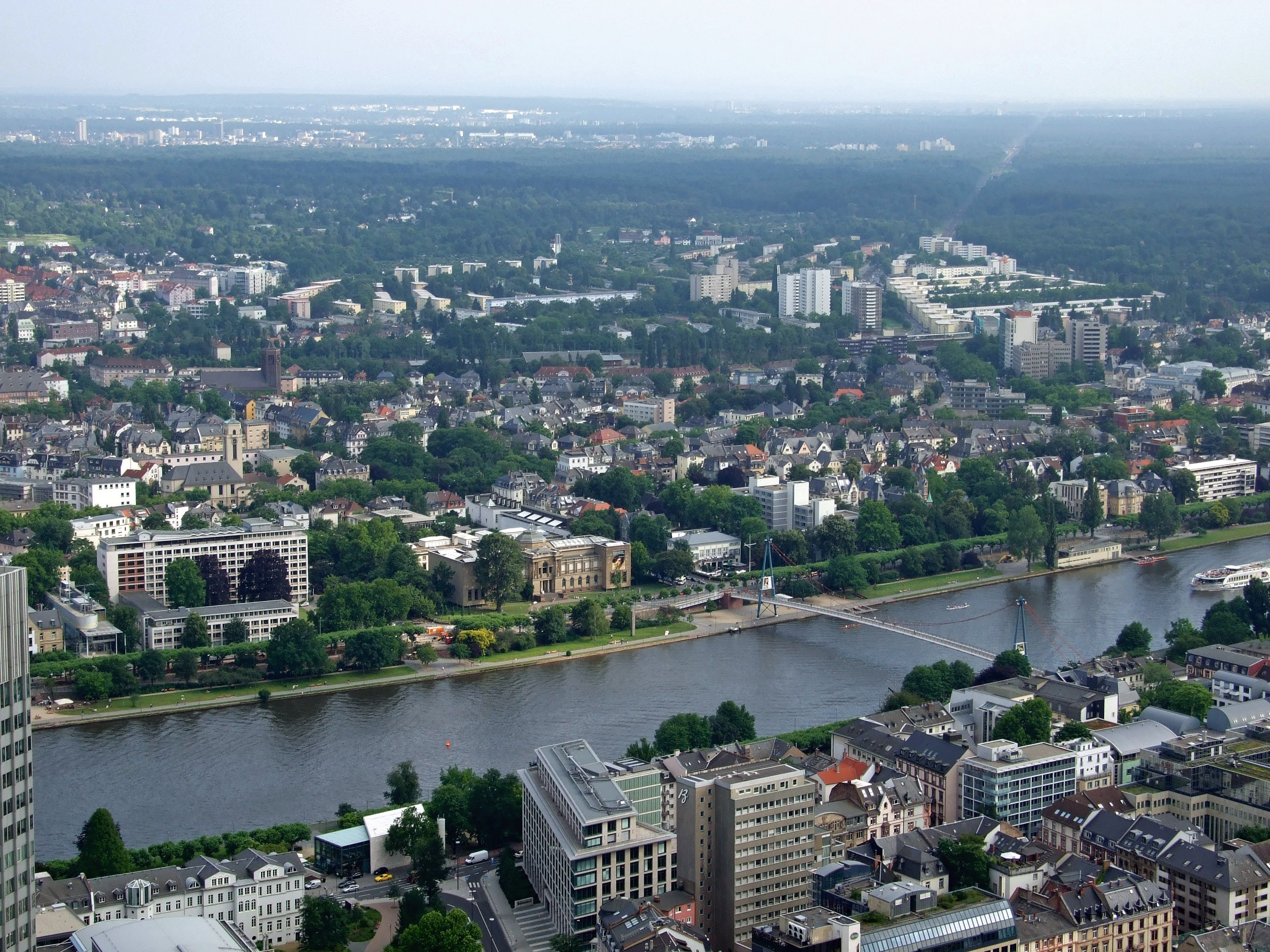
Part III, with Staedel, left from Holbeinsteg (Footbridge)

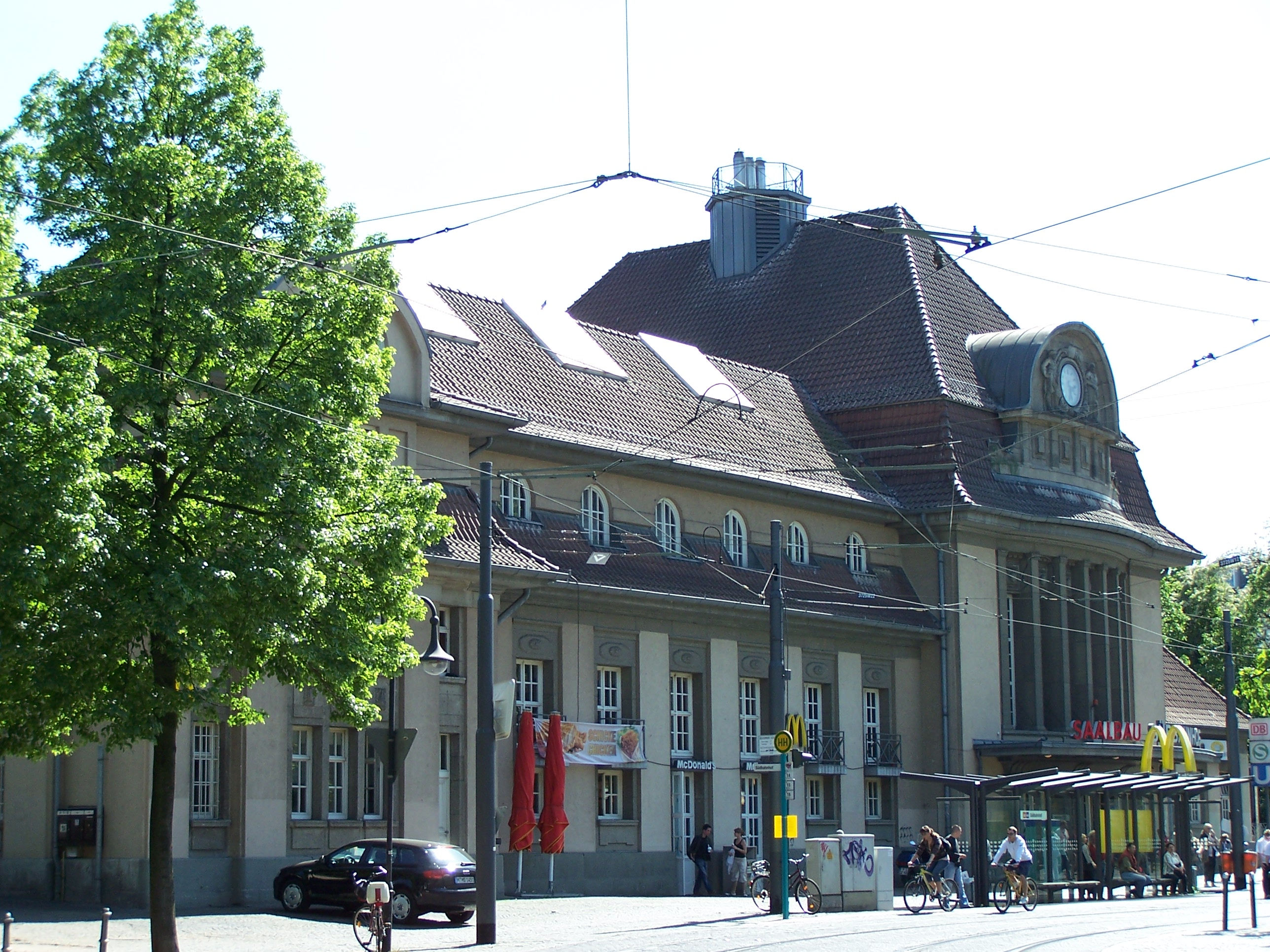
Railway station Frankfurt South

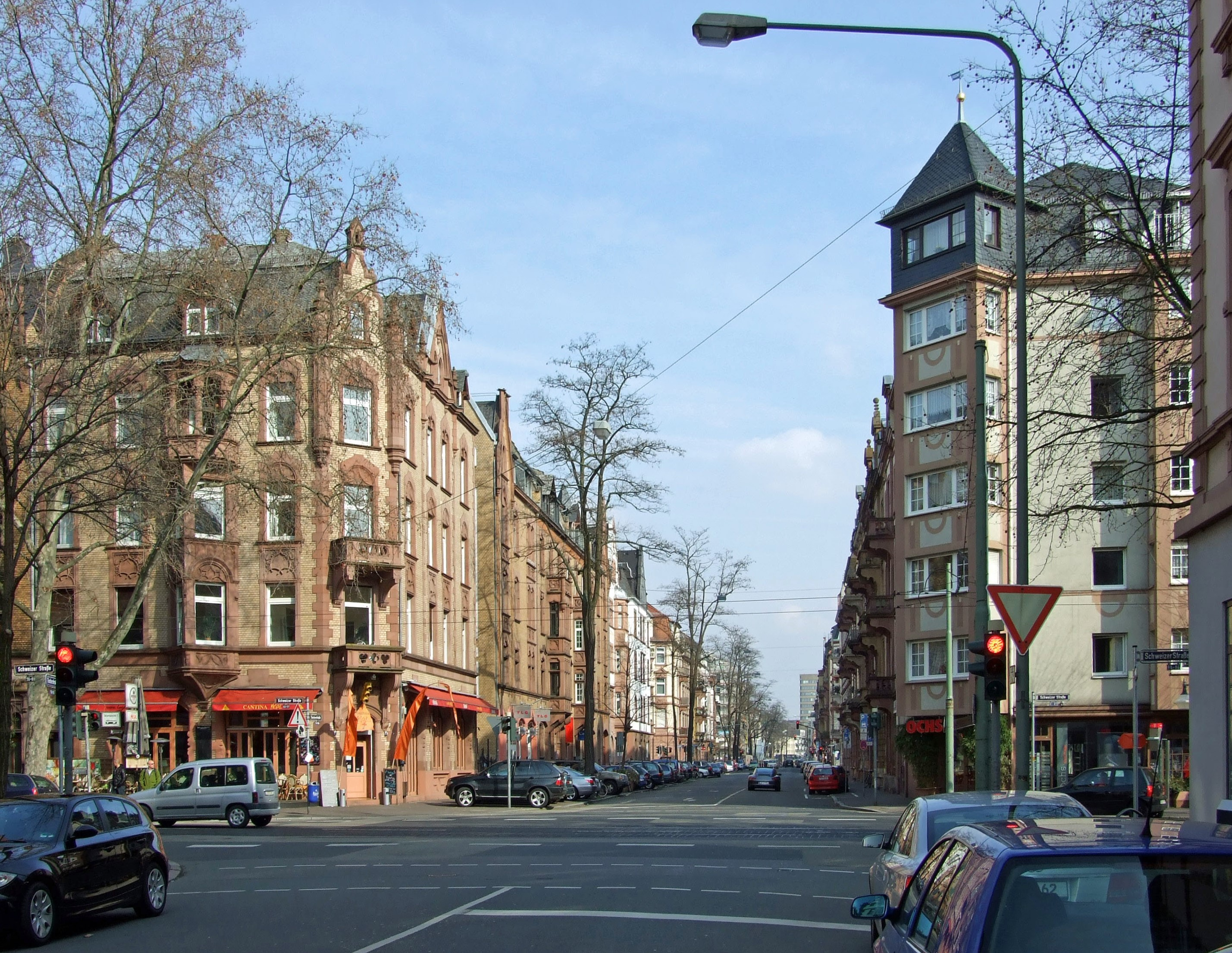
Textor Strasse crossing from Schweizer Strasse

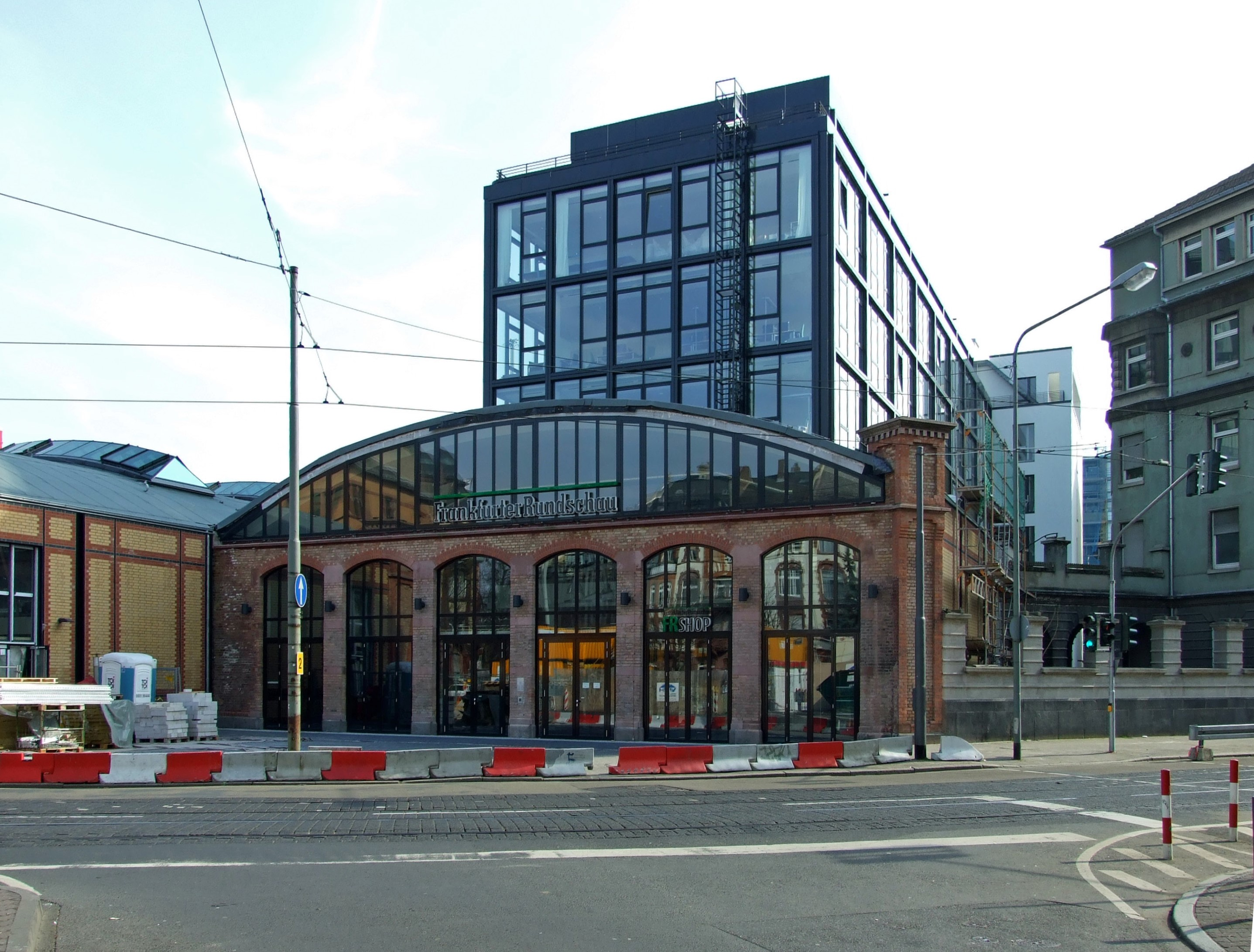
Frankfurter Rundschau next to railway station

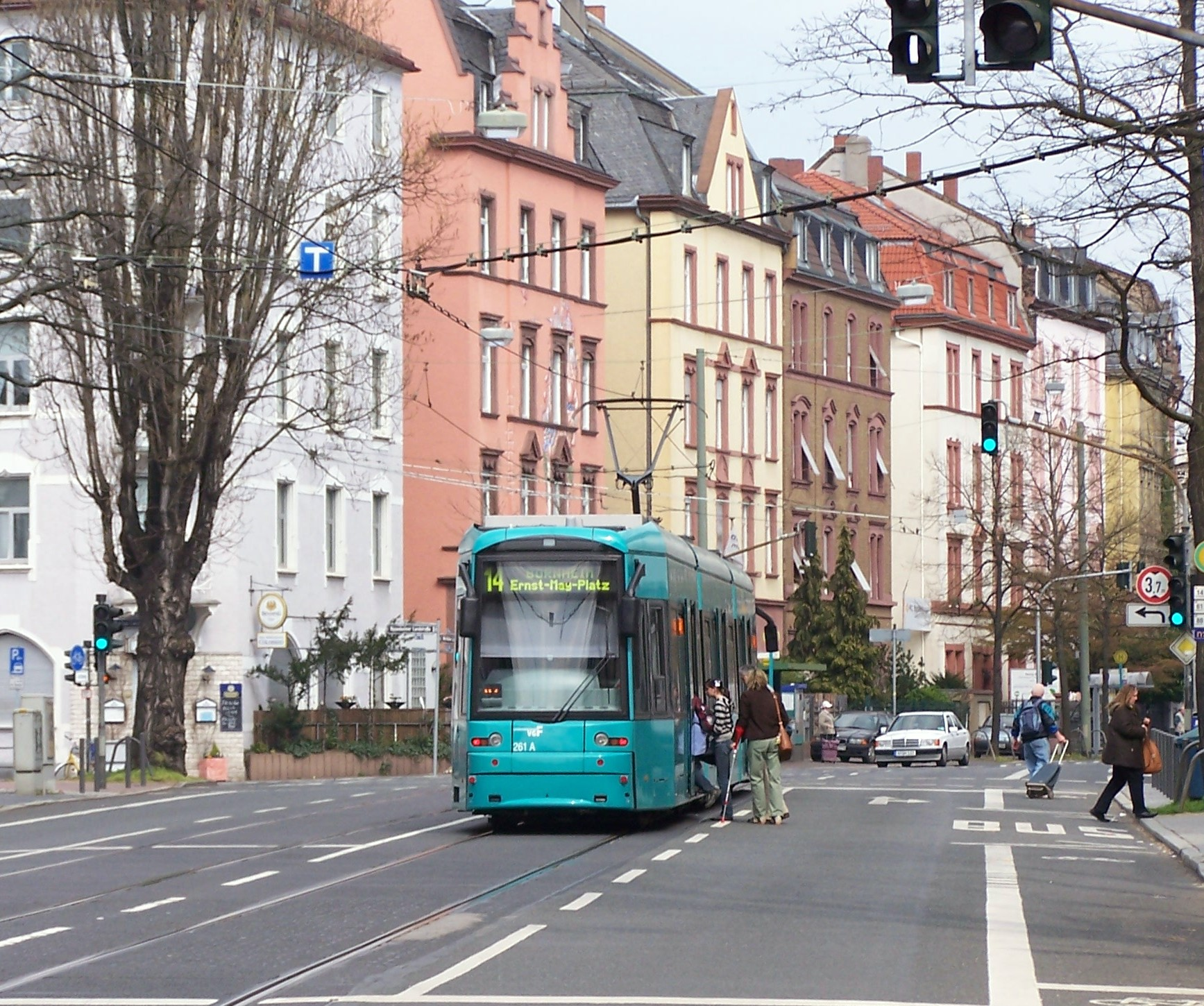
Tram

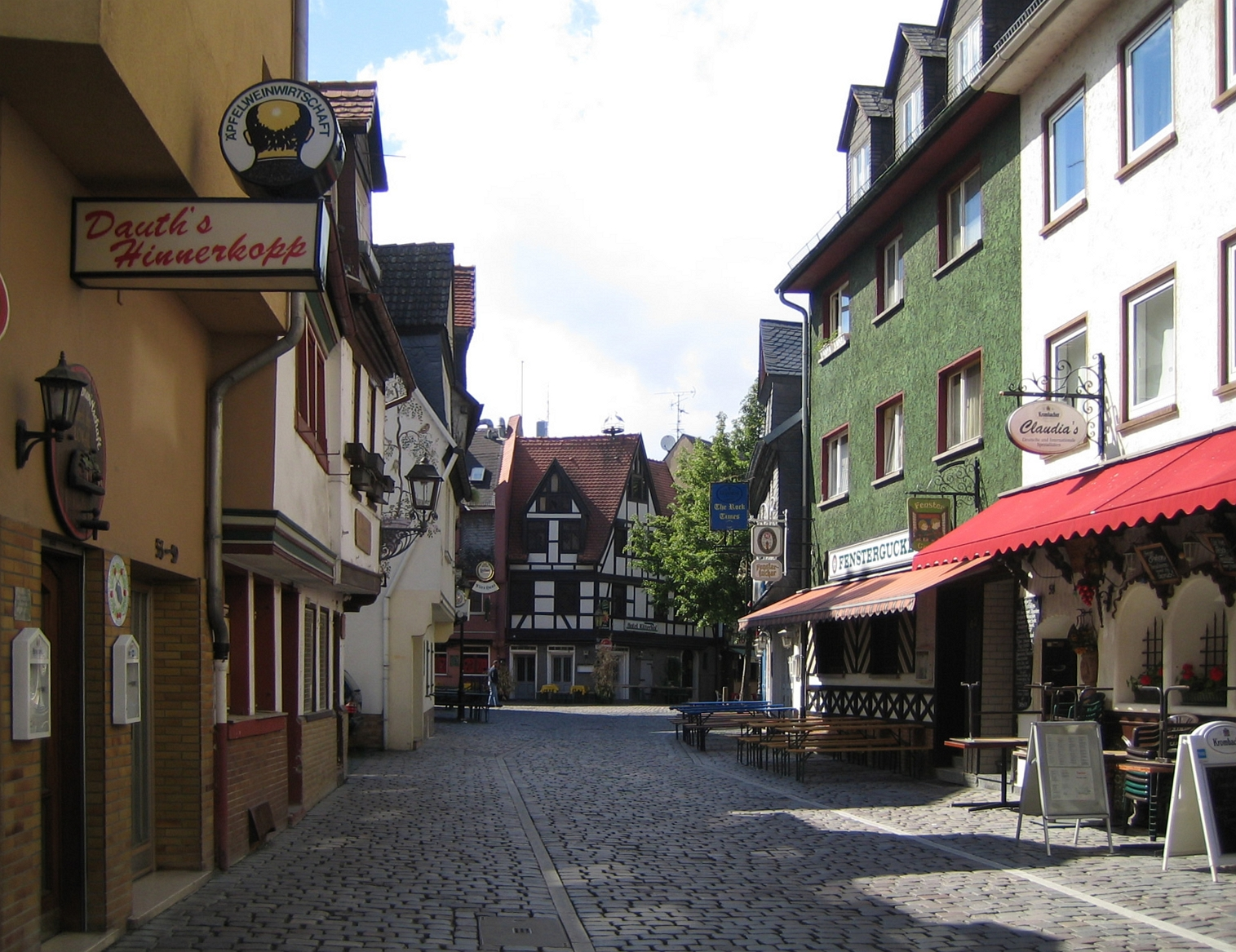
Apfelweinviertel

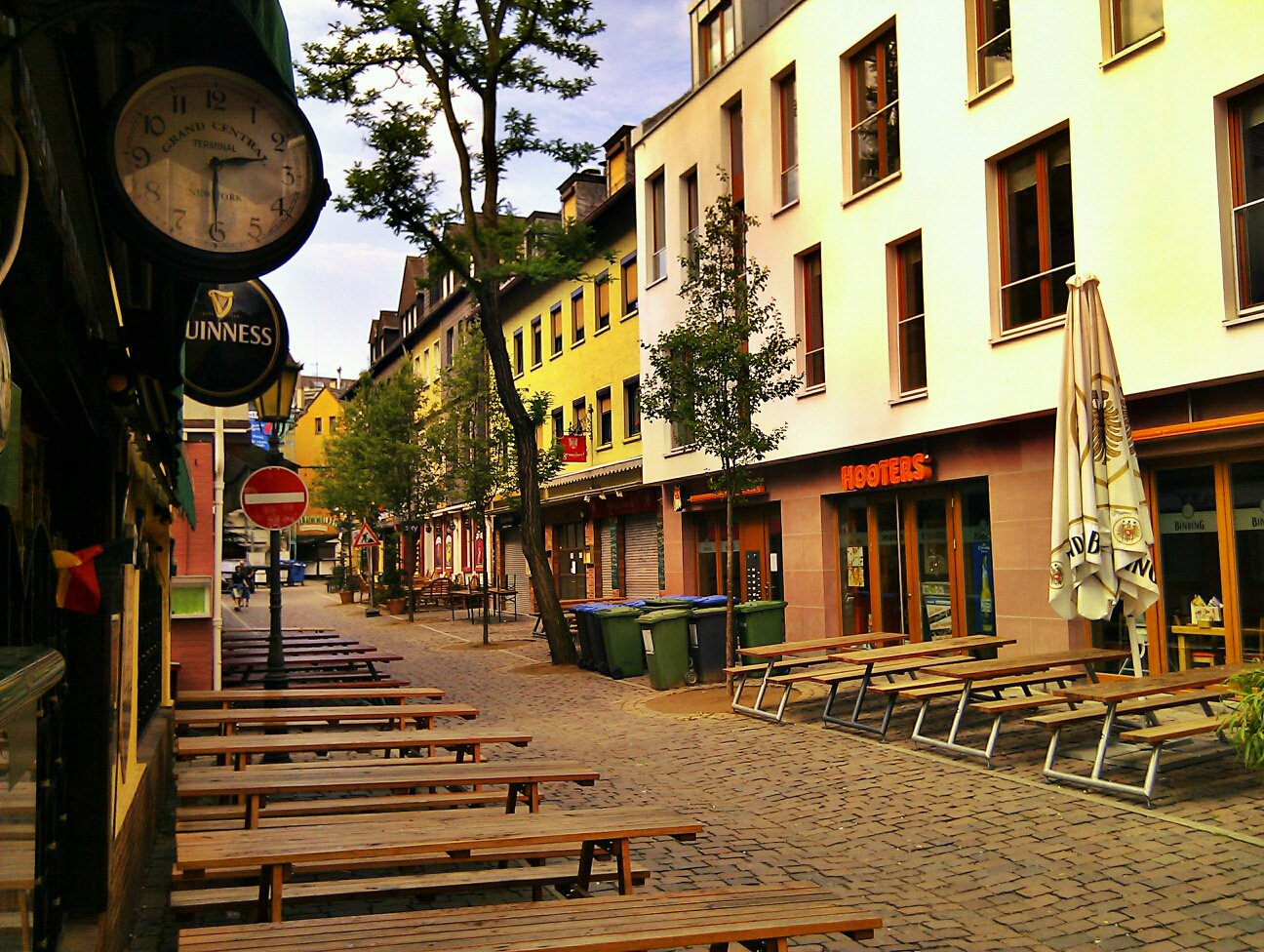
Hooters restaurant in Alt-Sachsenhausen

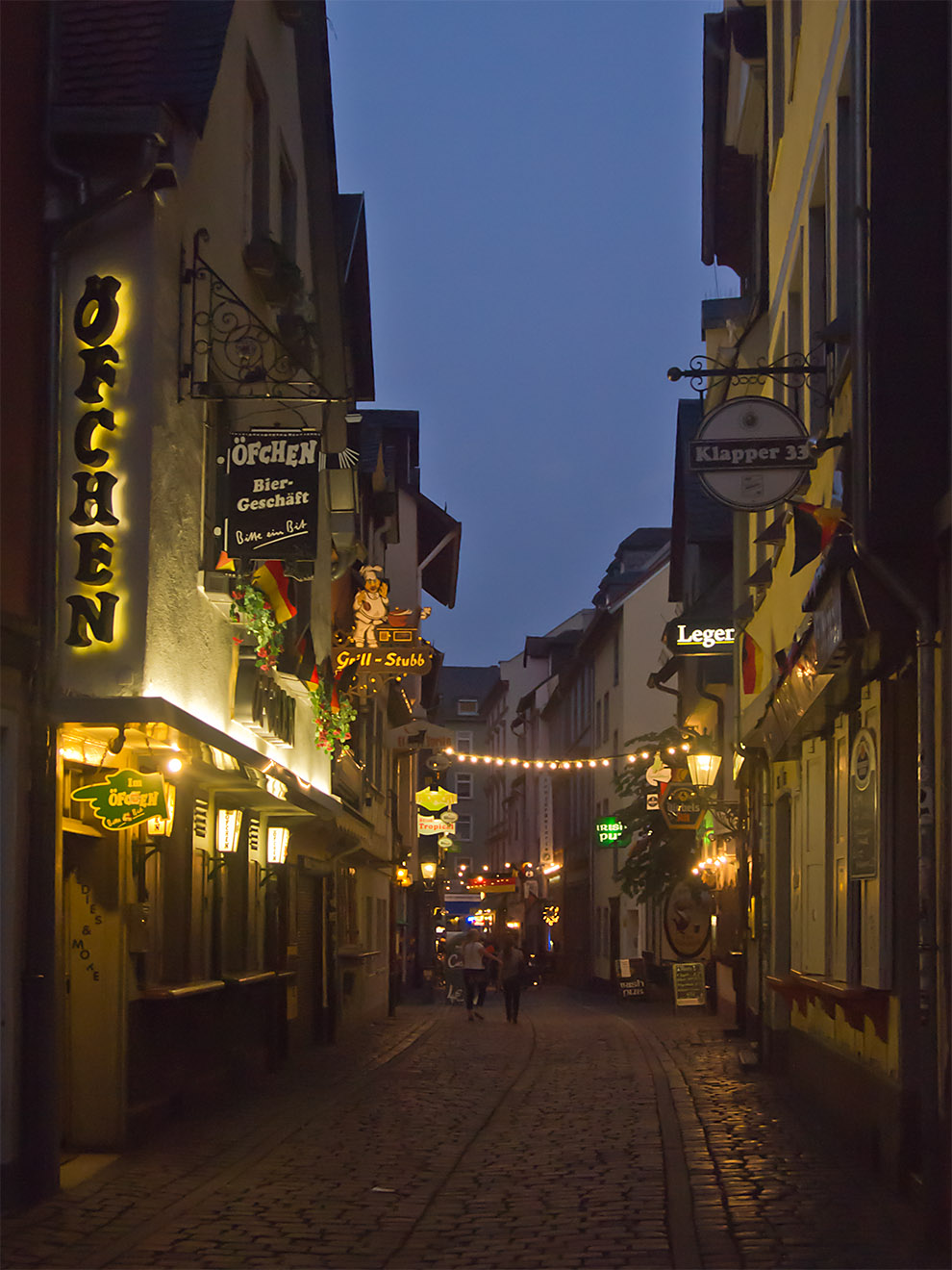
Klappergasse in Äppelwoiviertel

flea market on Museum Embankment

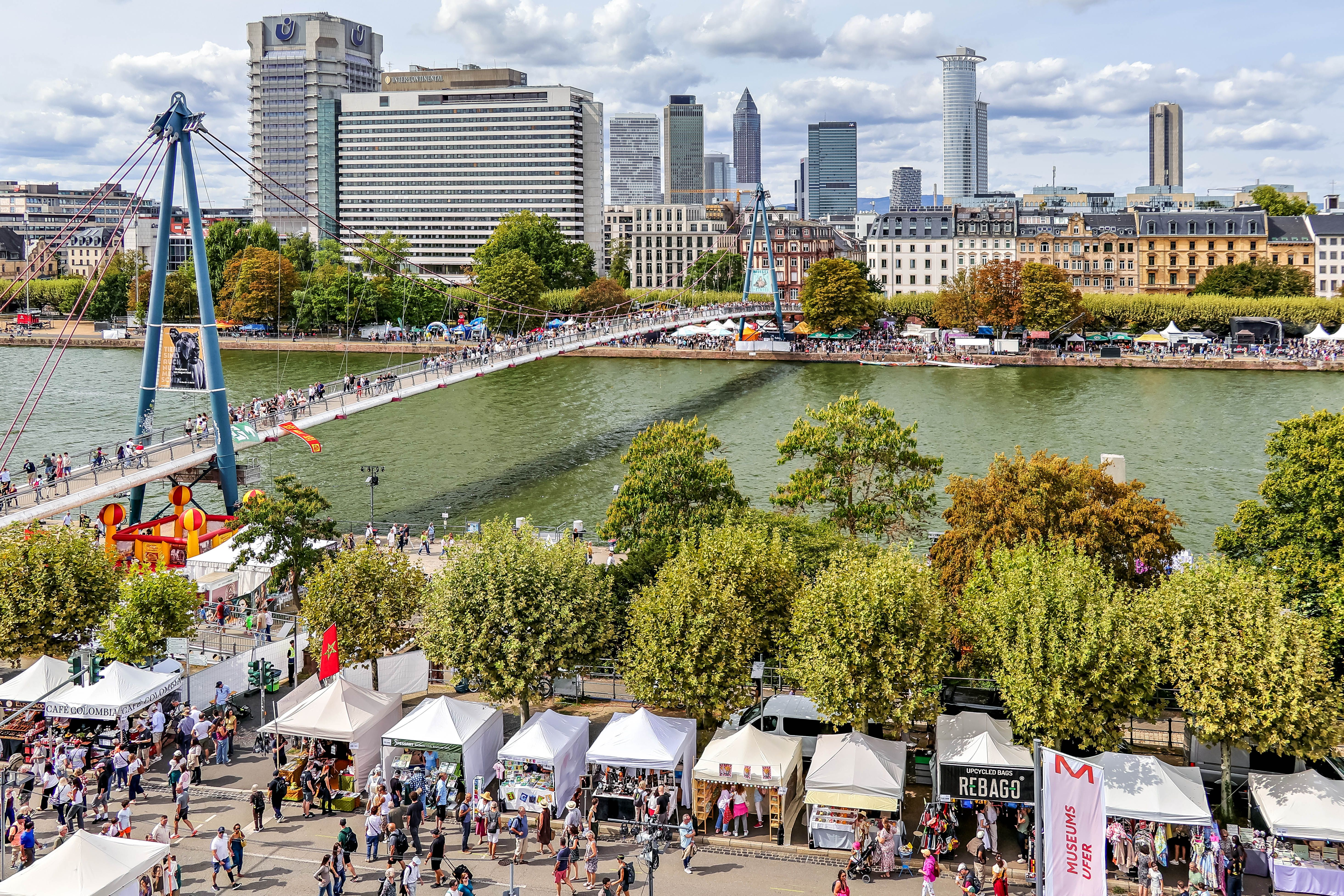
Museum Embankment Festival (Museumsuferfest)

Schweizer street fair

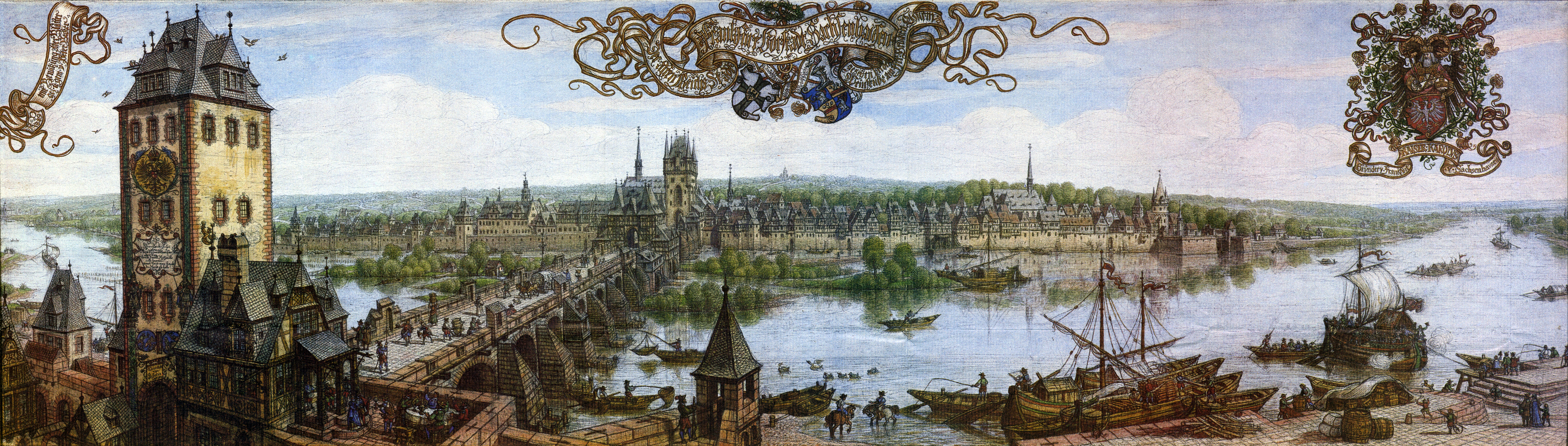
Frankfurt's Vorstadt of Sachsenhausen at the beginning of the 17th century, water colour. Peter Becker, 1889.
