= Preungesheim =

- Quarter of Frankfurt am Main
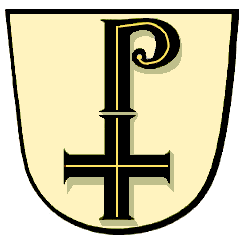
- Coat of arms

- Location of Preungesheim (red) and the Ortsbezirk Nord-Ost (light red) within Frankfurt am Main
- Interactive map of Preungesheim
- Location within Germany Location within Hesse
- Coordinates: 50°09′20″N 08°41′50″E
- Country: Germany
- State: Hesse
- Admin. region: Darmstadt
- District: Urban district
- City: Frankfurt am Main

Area
  - Total: 3.660 km^{2} (1.413 sq mi)

Population (2020-12-31)
  - Total: 15,775
  - Density: 4,310/km^{2} (11,160/sq mi)
- Time zone: UTC+01:00 (CET)
  - Summer (DST): UTC+02:00 (CEST)
- Postal codes: 60435
- Dialling codes: 069
- Vehicle registration: F
- Website: www.preungesheim.de

Preungesheim (German pronunciation: [ˈpʁɔʏŋɡəsˌhaɪm]) is a quarter of Frankfurt am Main, Germany. It is part of the Ortsbezirk Nord-Ost.
