= Nordend (Frankfurt am Main) =

Nordend-West Nordend-Ost
- Quarter of Frankfurt am Main
- Location of the Nordend (red) and the Ortsbezirk Innenstadt III (light red) within Frankfurt am Main
- Interactive map of Nordend-West; Nordend-Ost
- Location within Germany Location within Hesse
- Coordinates: 50°07′23″N 08°41′32″E
- Country: Germany
- State: Hesse
- Admin. region: Darmstadt
- District: Urban district
- City: Frankfurt am Main

Area
  - Total: 4.758 km^{2} (1.837 sq mi)

Population (2020-12-31)
  - Total: 54,110
  - Density: 11,370/km^{2} (29,450/sq mi)
- Time zone: UTC+01:00 (CET)
  - Summer (DST): UTC+02:00 (CEST)
- Postal codes: 60316, 60318, 60320, 60322, 60385, 60389
- Dialling codes: 069
- Vehicle registration: F

Nordend-West (German pronunciation: [ˈnɔʁtʔɛnt ˈvɛst]) and Nordend-Ost ([- ˈʔɔst]) are two quarters of Frankfurt am Main, Germany. The division into a western and an eastern part is mostly for administrative purposes, as the Nordend is generally considered an entity. Both city districts are part of the Ortsbezirk Innenstadt III.
