= Eckenheim =

- Quarter of Frankfurt am Main
- Coat of arms

- Location of Eckenheim (red) and the Ortsbezirk Nord-Ost (light red) within Frankfurt am Main
- Interactive map of Eckenheim
- Location within Germany Location within Hesse
- Coordinates: 50°08′57″N 08°40′50″E
- Country: Germany
- State: Hesse
- Admin. region: Darmstadt
- District: Urban district
- City: Frankfurt am Main

Area
  - Total: 2.347 km^{2} (0.906 sq mi)

Population (2020-12-31)
  - Total: 14,405
  - Density: 6,138/km^{2} (15,900/sq mi)
- Time zone: UTC+01:00 (CET)
  - Summer (DST): UTC+02:00 (CEST)
- Postal codes: 60435
- Dialling codes: 069
- Vehicle registration: F
- Website: www.eckenheim.de

Eckenheim (German pronunciation: [ˈɛkn̩haɪm]) is a quarter of Frankfurt am Main, Germany. It is part of the Ortsbezirk Nord-Ost.

Eckenheim was suburbanized on April 1, 1910.
