= Harheim =

- Borough of Frankfurt am Main
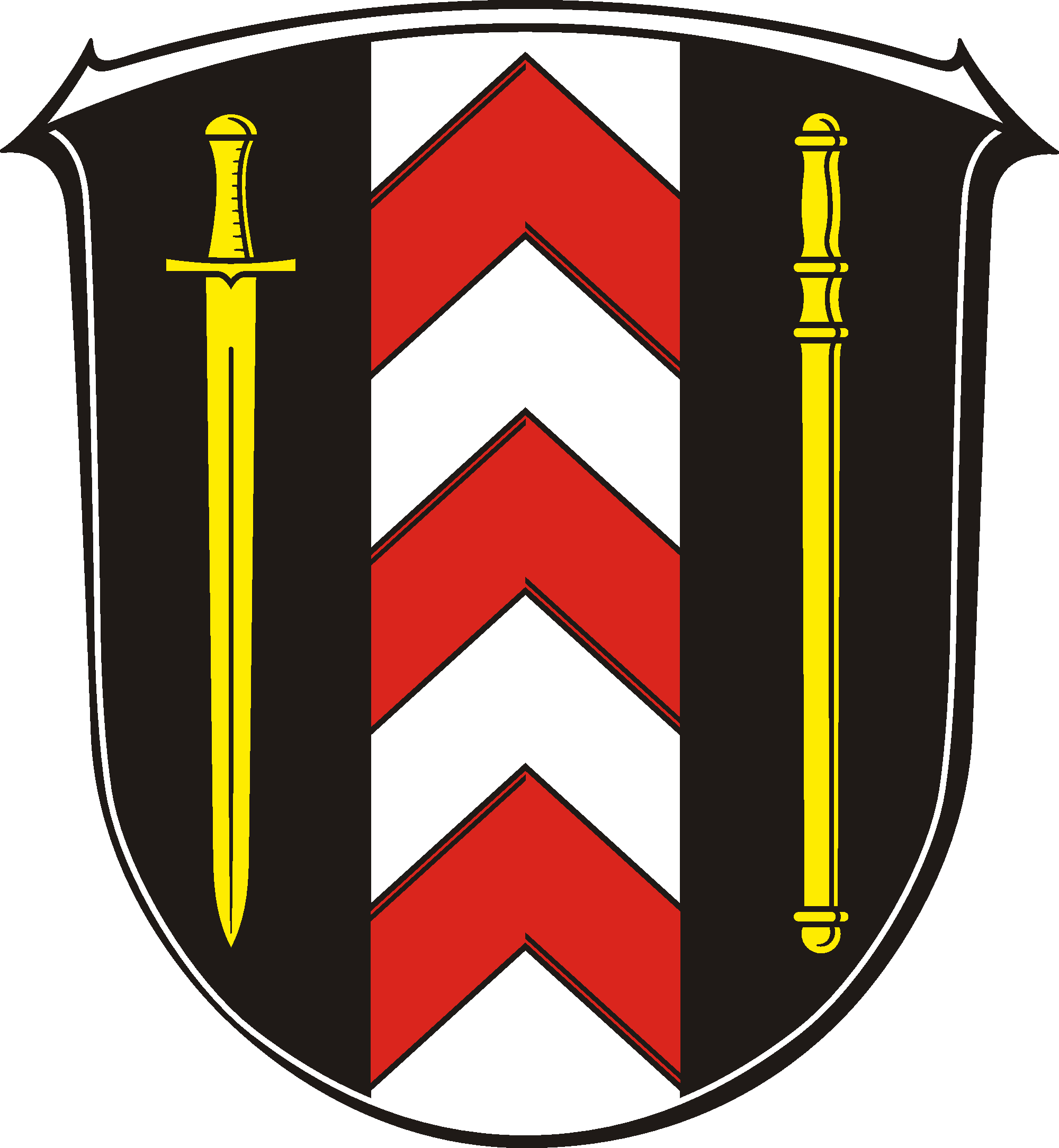
- Coat of arms

- Location of Harheim within Frankfurt am Main
- Interactive map of Harheim
- Location within Germany Location within Hesse
- Coordinates: 50°11′01″N 08°41′27″E
- Country: Germany
- State: Hesse
- Admin. region: Darmstadt
- District: Urban district
- City: Frankfurt am Main

Area
  - Total: 4.841 km^{2} (1.869 sq mi)

Population (2020-12-31)
  - Total: 5,294
  - Density: 1,094/km^{2} (2,832/sq mi)
- Time zone: UTC+01:00 (CET)
  - Summer (DST): UTC+02:00 (CEST)
- Postal codes: 60437
- Dialling codes: 06101
- Vehicle registration: F
- Website: www.harheim.de

Harheim (German pronunciation: [ˈhaːɐ̯haɪm]) is a borough (Ortsbezirk) of Frankfurt am Main, Germany.

It is a possible birthplace of the Minnesinger Bernger von Horheim.
