= List of tallest buildings in Germany =

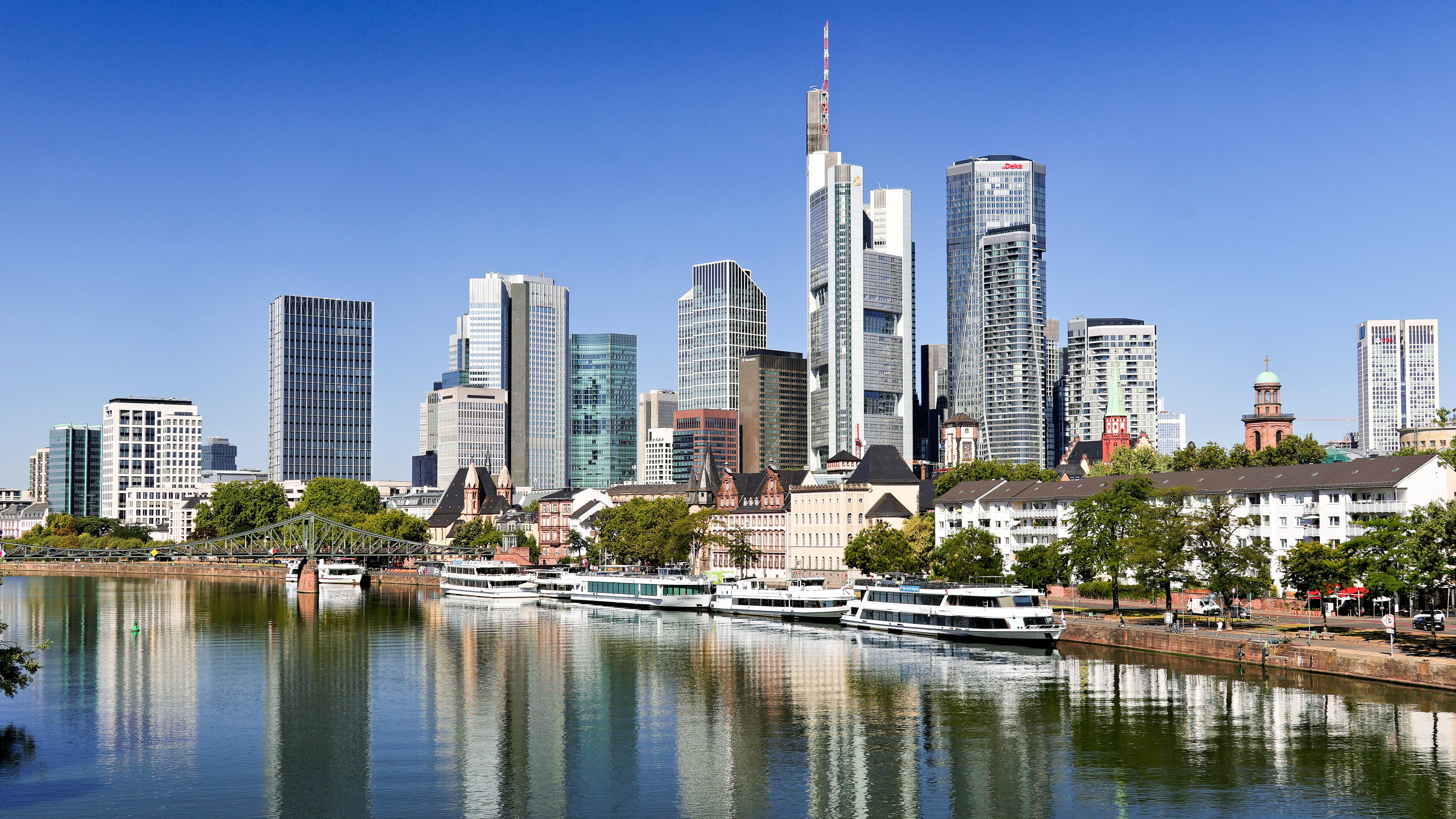
Frankfurt skyline in August 2026

This list ranks buildings in Germany that stand at least 100 metres (328 ft) tall. Only habitable buildings are ranked, which excludes radio masts and towers, observation towers, steeples, chimneys and other tall architectural structures.

The construction of high-rise buildings is not common in German cities, and especially not in the city centres, where traditionally steeples are the tallest structures. Due to its economic profile as an international financial centre, only Frankfurt has developed a skyline of high-rise buildings and skyscrapers in its city centre. Out of a total of 22 skyscrapers in Germany, meaning buildings at least 150 metres (492 ft) tall, 20 are located in Frankfurt.

The development of high-rises in Germany began in 1915, with the Zeiss Bau 15 in Jena. Notable examples of early high-rise buildings include the Wilhelm Marx House in Düsseldorf, the Borsigturm and Ullsteinhaus in Berlin, the Hansahochhaus in Cologne, the Anzeiger-Hochhaus in Hanover, the Tagblatt-Turm in Stuttgart, and the Kroch High-rise and Europahaus in Leipzig.

== Tallest buildings ==
Was the tallest building in Germany upon completion

This list ranks buildings in Germany that stand at least 100 metres (328 ft) tall. This includes spires and architectural details but does not include antenna masts.

Rank	Name	Image	City	Height (m)	Height (ft)	Floors	Year	Notes
1	Commerzbank Tower		Frankfurt	259	850	56	1997	Tallest building in Europe from 1997 to 2003; tallest building in the European Union from 1997 to 2011, and from 2020 to 2022; headquarters of Commerzbank; reaches a total height of 300.1 metres including the antenna
2	Messeturm		Frankfurt	256.5	841.5	63	1990	Tallest building in Europe from 1990 to 1997; main tenants are Goldman Sachs and Thomson Reuters
3	Four I		Frankfurt	233	764.4	59	2024	Highest occupied floor in Frankfurt.
4	Westendstraße 1		Frankfurt	208	682.4	53	1993	Headquarters of DZ Bank
5	Main Tower		Frankfurt	200	656.2	55	1999	Height including the antenna is 240 metres; main tenants are Landesbank Hessen-Thüringen and S&P Global Ratings
5	Tower 185		Frankfurt	200	656.2	55	2011	Main tenant is PricewaterhouseCoopers
7	One		Frankfurt	190.9	626	49	2022	Features a public bar with a surrounding roof terrace at a height of 185 metres
8	Omniturm		Frankfurt	189.9	623	46	2019	
9	Trianon		Frankfurt	186	610.2	45	1993	Main tenant is DekaBank
10	Seat of the European Central Bank		Frankfurt	185	607	45	2014	Height including the antenna is 201 metres; headquarters of the European Central Bank
11	Grand Tower		Frankfurt	179.9	590.2	47	2020	Tallest residential building in Germany
12	Four II		Frankfurt	179	587.2	47	2025	Topped out, Second tallest residential building in Germany
13	Estrel Tower		Berlin	176	577	45	2025	Tallest hotel in Germany and tallest skyscraper in Berlin. Tallest skyscraper outside Frankfurt am Main.
14	Opernturm		Frankfurt	170	557.7	42	2009	Main tenant is UBS
14	Taunusturm		Frankfurt	170	557.7	40	2014	
16	Silberturm		Frankfurt	166.3	545.6	32	1978	Tallest building in Germany from 1978 to 1990; former headquarters of Dresdner Bank, which merged with Commerzbank in 2009; main tenant is now Deutsche Bahn
17	Post Tower		Bonn	162.5	533.1	42	2002	Tallest building in Bonn and North Rhine-Westphalia; headquarters of Deutsche Post and DHL
18	Westend Gate		Frankfurt	159.3	522.6	47	1976	Tallest building in Germany from 1976 to 1978; main tenant is Marriott Frankfurt Hotel.
19	Deutsche Bank I		Frankfurt	155	509	40	1984	Headquarters of Deutsche Bank
19	Deutsche Bank II		Frankfurt	155	509	38	1984	Headquarters of Deutsche Bank
19	Marienturm		Frankfurt	155	509	38	2019	
22	Skyper		Frankfurt	153.8	504.6	38	2004	Main tenant is DekaBank
23	Kölnturm		Cologne	148.5	487	43	2001	Tallest building in Cologne; height including the antenna is 165 metres
24	Eurotower		Frankfurt	148	485.6	39	1977	Former headquarters of the European Central Bank
25	Colonia-Haus		Cologne	147	482.3	42	1973	Tallest building in Germany from 1973 to 1976
25	Atlantic Hotel Sail City		Bremerhaven	147	482.3	23	2008	Tallest building in the state of Bremen; the roof top is at 86 metres, but the architectural spire counts as official height; main tenant is Atlantic Hotels
27	Hochhaus Uptown München		Munich	146	479	38	2004	Tallest building in Munich and Bavaria; headquarters of Telefónica Germany
28	One Forty West		Frankfurt	145	476	41	2020	
29	Jen Tower		Jena	144.5	474.1	32	1972	Tallest building in Thuringia; headquarters of Intershop Communications
30	City-Hochhaus Leipzig		Leipzig	142.5	467.5	36	1972	Tallest building in Leipzig; tallest building in the former East Germany; tallest building within both Germanies from 1972 to 1973; tallest in Saxony; height including the antenna is 155 metres; main tenant is European Energy Exchange
31	Frankfurter Büro Center		Frankfurt	142.4	467.2	40	1980	Main tenant is Clifford Chance
32	City-Haus		Frankfurt	142.1	466.2	42	1974	Main tenant is DZ Bank
33	Edge East Side Tower		Berlin	142	465.9	36	2023	Main tenant is Amazon
34	Henninger Turm		Frankfurt	140	459	40	2017	
35	Gallileo		Frankfurt	136	446.2	38	1999	Main tenant is Commerzbank
35	Nextower		Frankfurt	136	446.2	32	2009	Part of the Palais Quartier complex
37	Business Tower Nürnberg		Nürnberg	135	442.9	34	1999	Headquarters of Nürnberger Versicherungsgruppe
38	Uni Center Köln		Cologne	134	439.6	42	1973	
39	Pollux		Frankfurt	130	426.5	33	1997	Part of the Kastor und Pollux complex; main tenant is Commerzbank
40	The Spin		Frankfurt	128	420	31	2023	
40	Four III		Frankfurt	128	420	32	2024	
42	Garden Tower		Frankfurt	127	416.7	25	1976	Former headquarters of Landesbank Hessen-Thüringen; main tenant is Société Générale
42	RWE Tower		Essen	127	416.7	30	1996	Headquarters of RWE
44	Highlight I		Munich	126	413.4	33	2004	Main tenant is Roland Berger Strategy Consultants
45	Treptowers		Berlin	125	410.1	32	1998	
46	Park Inn Berlin		Berlin	125	410	41	1969	
47	Arag-Tower		Düsseldorf	124.9	409.8	32	2001	Tallest building in Düsseldorf
48	LVA Hauptgebäude		Düsseldorf	123	403.5	29	1976	
49	City Tower Offenbach		Offenbach am Main	120	393.7	32	2003	
50	Maritim Travemünde		Travemünde	119	390.4	35	1974	Tallest building in Schleswig-Holstein
50	Upper West		Berlin	119	390.4	33	2017	
52	Steglitzer Kreisel		Berlin	118.5	393.7	30	1980	
53	Zoofenster		Berlin	118	387.1	32	2012	
54	Messe Torhaus		Frankfurt	117	383.9	30	1984	
55	UN-Hochhaus		Bonn	115	377.3	31	1969	Also known as Langer Eugen; built as the Neues Abgeordnetenhochhaus ("New Representatives Tower") to provide office space for Bundestag representatives and used as such until the Bundestag moved to Berlin in 1999
55	Dorint Hotel Tower		Augsburg	115	377.3	35	1972	
55	Japan Center		Frankfurt	115	377.3	28	1996	
55	Park Tower		Frankfurt	115	377.3	29	2007	
59	Hypo-Haus		Munich	113.7	373	27	1981	
60	Highlight II		Munich	113	370.7	28	2004	
61	Westhafen Tower		Frankfurt	112.3	368.4	30	2003	
62	TÜV Rheinland		Cologne	112	367.5	22	1974	
62	IBC Tower		Frankfurt	112	367.5	30	2003	
64	Büro Center Nibelungenplatz		Frankfurt	110	360.9	27	1966	
64	Eurotheum		Frankfurt	110	360.9	31	1999	
64	WinX		Frankfurt	110	360.9	30	2019	
64	Elbe Philharmonic Hall		Hamburg	110	360.9	26	2017	Tallest building in Hamburg
68	Ringturm Cologne		Cologne	109.1	357.9	26	1973	
69	Neue Mainzer Straße 32-36		Frankfurt	108.6	356.3	28	1973	
70	Radisson Blu Hotel Hamburg		Hamburg	108	354.3	32	1973	
70	Victoria Haus		Düsseldorf	108	354.3	29	1998	
72	Essen City Hall		Essen	106	347.8	23	1979	
72	Senckenberg Turm		Frankfurt	106	347.8	26	2022	
72	Atrium Tower		Berlin	106	347.8	22	1997	
75	Land- und Amtsgericht Köln		Cologne	105	344.5	25	1981	
76	Four IV		Frankfurt	105	344.5	25	2024	
77	Kölntriangle		Cologne	103.2	338.6	29	2006	
78	Bahntower		Berlin	103	331.4	25	2000	
78	Europa-Center		Berlin	103	337.9	22	1965	
78	SV-Hochhaus		Munich	103	337.9	28	2008	
81	Herkules Hochhaus		Cologne	102	334.6	31	1969	
81	Kudamm Karree		Berlin	102	334.6	20	1974	
81	Apartment-Hochhaus am Collini-Center		Mannheim	102	334.6	32	1975	Tallest building in Baden-Württemberg
81	Deutschlandradio-Turm		Cologne	102	334.6	19	1975	
85	Neuer Kanzlerplatz		Bonn	101.5	333	28	2023	
86	Mundsburg Turm I		Hamburg	101.4	332.7	29	1973	
87	Kollhoff-Tower		Berlin	101	331.4	25	1999	
87	BMW Headquarters		Munich	101	331.4	22	1973	
87	Maritim Clubhotel		Timmendorfer Strand	101	331.4	32	1973	
90	Neckarpromenade Wohnturm I		Mannheim	100	330	30	1975	
90	Neckarpromenade Wohnturm II		Mannheim	100	330	30	1975	
90	Neckarpromenade Wohnturm III		Mannheim	100	330	30	1975	
90	Leonardo Royal Hotel Frankfurt		Frankfurt	100	328.1	25	1972	
90	Die Pyramide		Berlin	100	328.1	23	1995	
90	RellingHaus II		Essen	100	328.1	21	1999	

== Under construction or on hold ==
This list ranks buildings under construction in Germany that plan to stand at least 100 metres (328 ft) tall. This includes spires and architectural details but does not include antenna masts.

Name	City	Height (m)	Height (ft)	Floors	Year
Central Business Tower	Frankfurt	205	672	52	2028
Elbtower	Hamburg	199	653	52	On hold
Hines-Hochhaus	Berlin	150	492	39	On hold
Alexander Tower	Berlin	150	492	35	On hold
MYND-Turm	Berlin	146	479	33	2026
Covivio Tower	Berlin	138	453	36	2026
Sparda-Bank Tower	Frankfurt	124	407	35	2025
Phönix Tower	Düsseldorf	120	394	36	2028
Agromex Tower I	Berlin	110	361	30	2025
Schwabenlandtower	Fellbach	107	351	34	On hold

== Proposed ==
This list ranks proposed buildings in Germany that plan to stand at least 100 metres (328 ft) tall. This includes spires and architectural details but does not include antenna masts.

Name	City	Height (m)	Height (ft)	Floors	Year
Millennium Tower I	Frankfurt	288	945	69	2030
Kaiserkarree (Gloria)	Frankfurt	195	640	40	
New Center at Berlin Zoo	Berlin	179	587	40	
Das Präsidium	Frankfurt	175	574	48	
Gallusanlage 8	Frankfurt	170	558		
Millennium Tower II	Frankfurt	157	515	45	2030
Paketposthalle towers	Munich	155	509		
Hines Hochhaus	Berlin	150	492	39	
Münsterstraße 304-306	Düsseldorf	149	489		
DEVK Headquarters	Cologne	144	473	38	2030
Grand Central - Icoon	Frankfurt	140	459		
High Square Essen	Essen	139	456	36	2028
Hochhaus an der Matthäuskirche	Frankfurt	135	443	36	
Frankfurter Sparkasse-Hochhaus	Frankfurt	130	426		
NAMU Tower	Offenbach	124	407	32	2027
New Heart on the Block	Düsseldorf	120	394	29	2028
Twist	Düsseldorf	117	384	26	
Hochhaus am Hauptbahnhof	Düsseldorf	115	377	31	
NION	Frankfurt	111	364	28	
Technisches Rathaus	Düsseldorf	110	361	30	
Elbbrücken 120	Hamburg	110	361	28	
Finanzministerium I	Düsseldorf	107	351		
ICC Hochhaus	Berlin	106	348	29	
Flossbach von Storch Headquarters	Cologne	103	338	26	2030
NRW Bank	Düsseldorf	100	328		
Finanzministerium II	Düsseldorf	100	328		
Cologneo II	Cologne	100	328		2030

== Demolished buildings ==
Name	Image	City	Height (m)	Height (ft)	Floors	Year built	Year demolished	Notes
Funkhaus am Raderberggürtel		Cologne	138	453	34	1978	2019–2021	Former headquarters of Deutsche Welle
Bayer-Hochhaus		Leverkusen	122	400	29	1963	2012–2013	Tallest building in Germany from 1963 to 1972
AfE-Turm		Frankfurt	116	381	32	1972	2014	Tallest building in Europe to be demolished using explosives
Friedrich-Engelhorn-Hochhaus		Ludwigshafen	102	333	28	1957	2013–2014	Tallest building in Germany from 1957 to 1963
Sparkasse Hagen Tower		Hagen	101	331	23	1975	2004	

== Timeline of tallest buildings ==
Name	Image	City	Height (m)	Height (ft)	Floors	Years as tallest
Friedrich-Engelhorn-Hochhaus		Ludwigshafen	102	335	28	1957–1963 (demolished)
Bayer-Hochhaus		Leverkusen	122	400	29	1963–1972 (demolished)
City-Hochhaus Leipzig		Leipzig	143	468	36	1972–1973
Colonia-Hochhaus		Cologne	147	482	42	1973–1976
Westend Gate		Frankfurt	159	522	47	1976–1978
Silberturm		Frankfurt	166	545	32	1978–1990
Messeturm		Frankfurt	257	843	55	1990–1997
Commerzbank Tower		Frankfurt	259	850	56	1997–present

== Cities with buildings over 100 metres ==
City	≥300 m	≥250 m	≥200 m	≥150 m	≥100 m
Frankfurt		2	6	20	43
Berlin				1	13
Cologne					9
Munich					6
Mannheim					4
Bonn				1	3
Hamburg					3
Essen					3
Düsseldorf					3
Timmendorfer Strand					1
Augsburg					1
Jena					1
Leipzig					1
Nürnberg					1
Bremerhaven					1
Offenbach am Main					1
Travemünde					1

== See also ==
- List of tallest buildings by German federal state
- List of tallest buildings in Berlin
- List of tallest buildings in Bochum
- List of tallest buildings in Bonn
- List of tallest buildings in Braunschweig
- List of tallest buildings in Bremen
- List of tallest buildings in Cologne
- List of tallest buildings in Dortmund
- List of tallest buildings in Düsseldorf
- List of tallest buildings in Essen
- List of tallest buildings in Frankfurt
- List of tallest buildings in Hamburg
- List of tallest buildings in Hanover
- List of tallest buildings in Jena
- List of tallest buildings in Leipzig
- List of tallest buildings in Mannheim
- List of tallest buildings in Munich
- List of tallest buildings in Nuremberg
- List of tallest buildings in Offenbach
- List of tallest buildings in Stuttgart
- List of tallest buildings in Europe
