= Skyline Plaza (Frankfurt) =

Building complex in Germany

Coordinates: 50°06′34″N 8°39′10″E

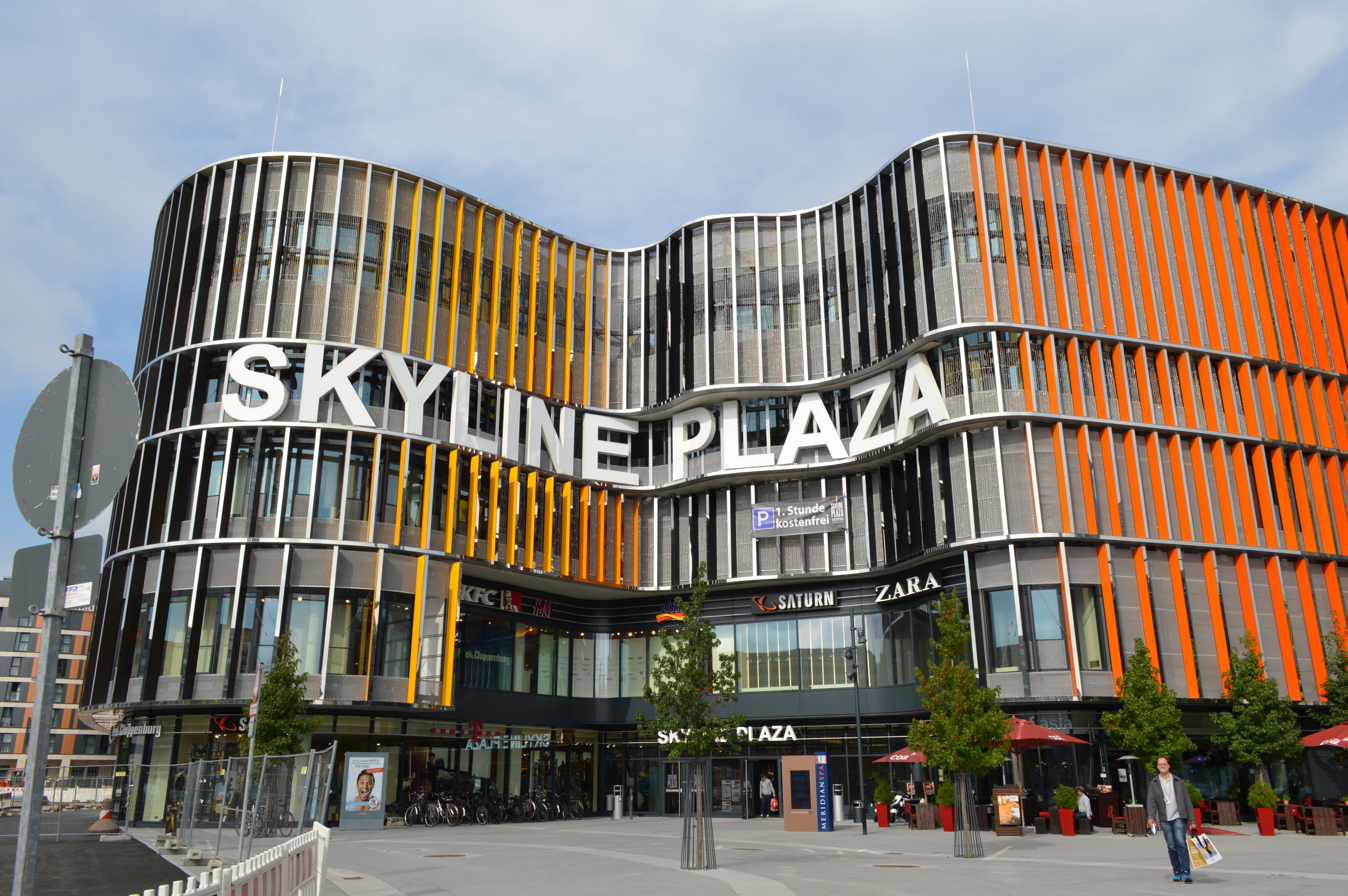
Skyline Plaza, south-east side

Skyline Plaza is a building complex in the western part of Frankfurt, Germany, near the trade fair premises of Messe Frankfurt, and is consisted of four buildings:

- a shopping mall with around 180 shops and restaurants (opened on 29 August 2013) and a large spa (opening scheduled for February 2014)
- a congress center for Messe Frankfurt (opened in 2014)
- a 191 m (627 ft) office tower
- Grand Tower: a 180 m (590 ft) residential tower

== Location ==
The complex is located on a site that housed Frankfurt's central goods station until 1998. The whole area, including the former railroad tracks, has since been developed into a new housing and business area called Europaviertel. The Skyline Plaza complex borders the Frankfurt trade fair premises and the Messeturm to the north.

== Buildings ==
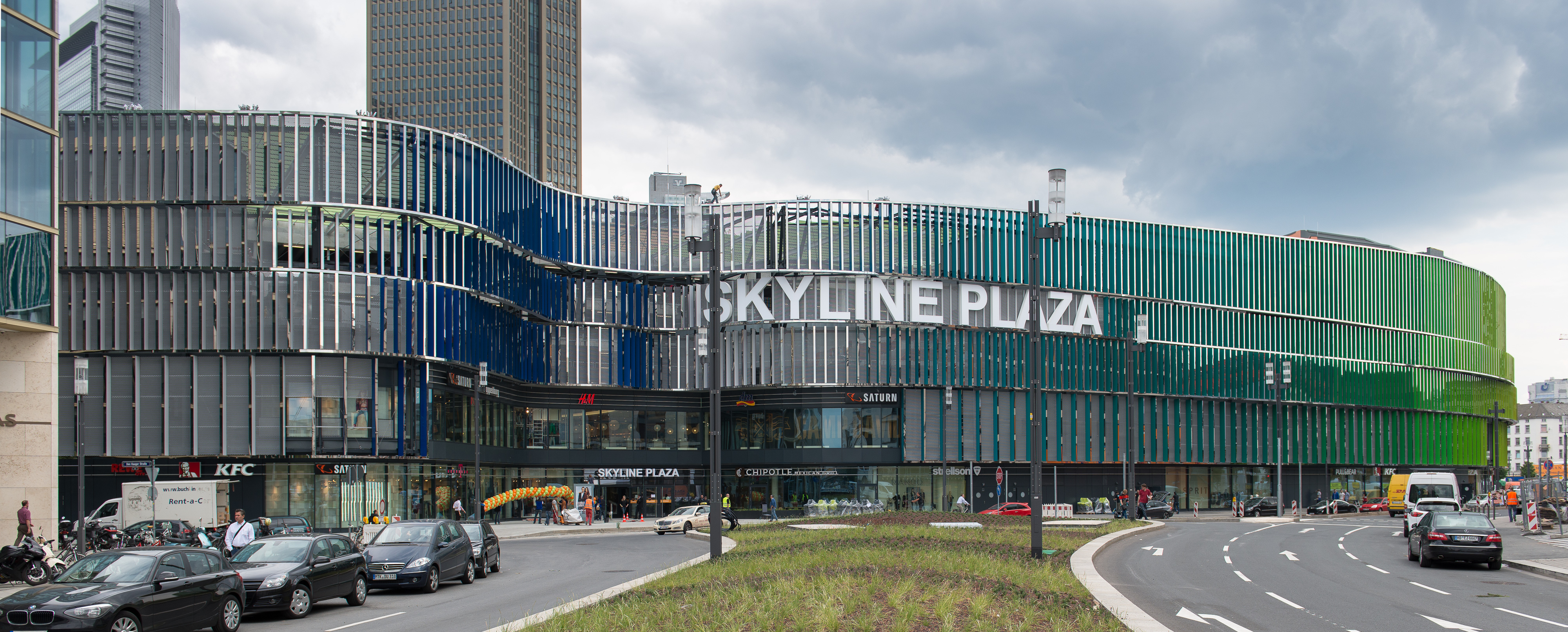
Skyline Plaza, view from Europa-Allee with Tower 185 in the background

=== Shopping mall and spa ===
The oval-shaped building with a total of 38,000 square meters of sales floor on two levels and around 2,400 parking spaces opened on 29 August 2013. A unique attraction is a public park-like area on top of the building with a restaurant, a playground and green areas (Skyline Garden). A separate fitness and spa area, operated by MeridianSpa, opened on 1 February 2014.

=== Congress center Kap Europa ===
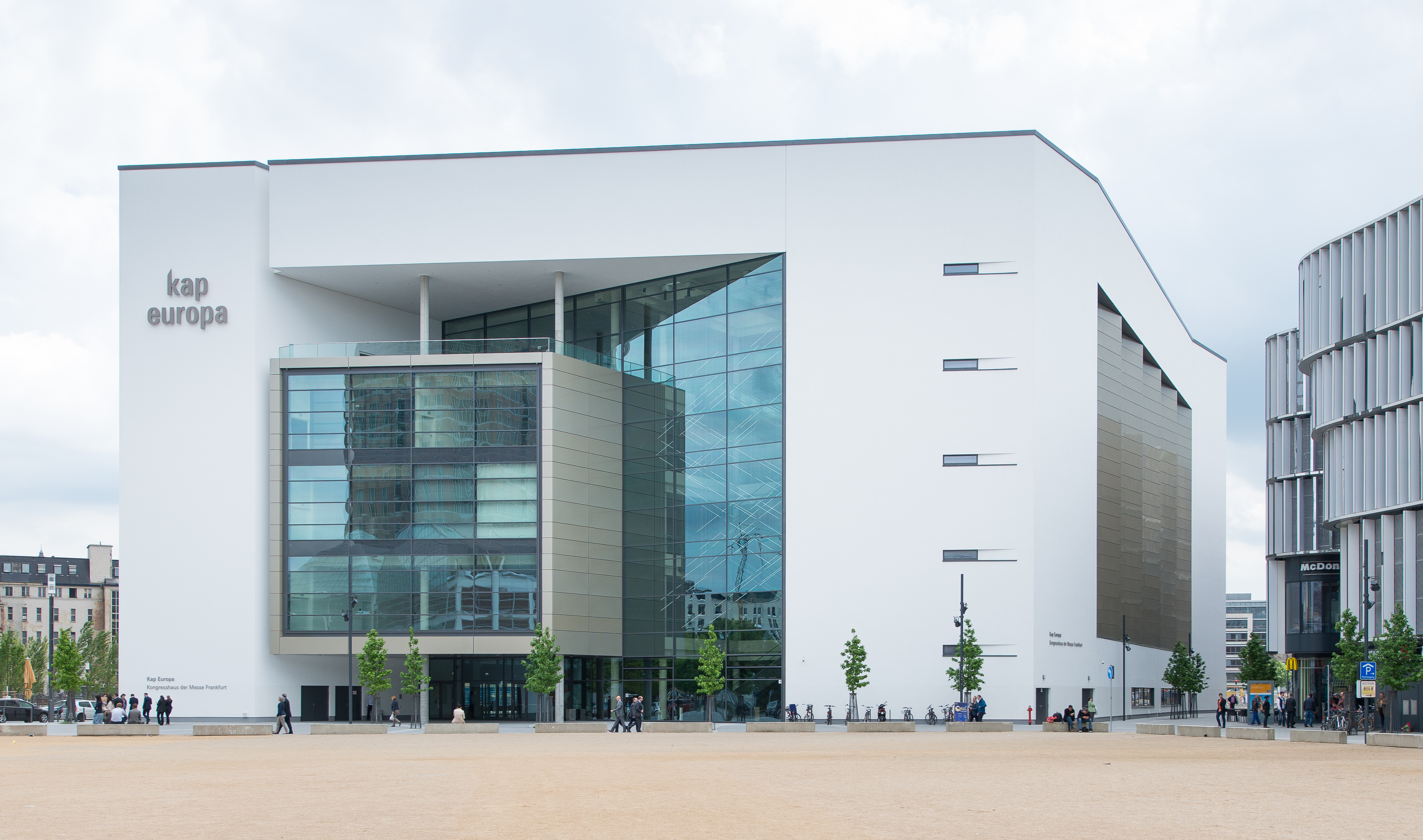
Congress center Kap Europa

The congress center is used by Messe Frankfurt and offers 14 meeting rooms for up to 2,400 people. It is the only building used by Messe Frankfurt that is located outside the actual trade fair grounds. It opened in May 2014.

=== Office tower ONE Frankfurt ===
A 191 m (627 ft) office tower, designed by French architect Jean Nouvel, is planned for the north corner of the Skyline Plaza site. The construction is planned to start in 2017 and to be completed in 2022.

=== Residential tower Grand Tower ===
In 2008 Hyatt Hotels Corporation signed a contract to build a luxury 110m Grand Hyatt hotel tower on the site. The proposed design was created by UNStudio. In 2013 Hyatt dropped out of the project.

In April 2014, the Grand Tower, a residential tower with a height of 160m was proposed instead. In March 2016, the construction began, with an increased height of 180m, and was completed in June 2020.

== Public transport ==
Skyline Plaza is well accessible with the public transport system. Nearby are the stations:

- Festhalle/Messe
- 16 17 Festhalle/Messe
- 11 14 21 Güterplatz

Once the new section of line U5 from Hauptbahnhof to Wohnpark station will be in service, Güterplatz station will be the nearest lightrail station to Skyline Plaza.
