= Kastor und Pollux =

Two high rise buildings in the Gallus district of Frankfurt, Germany

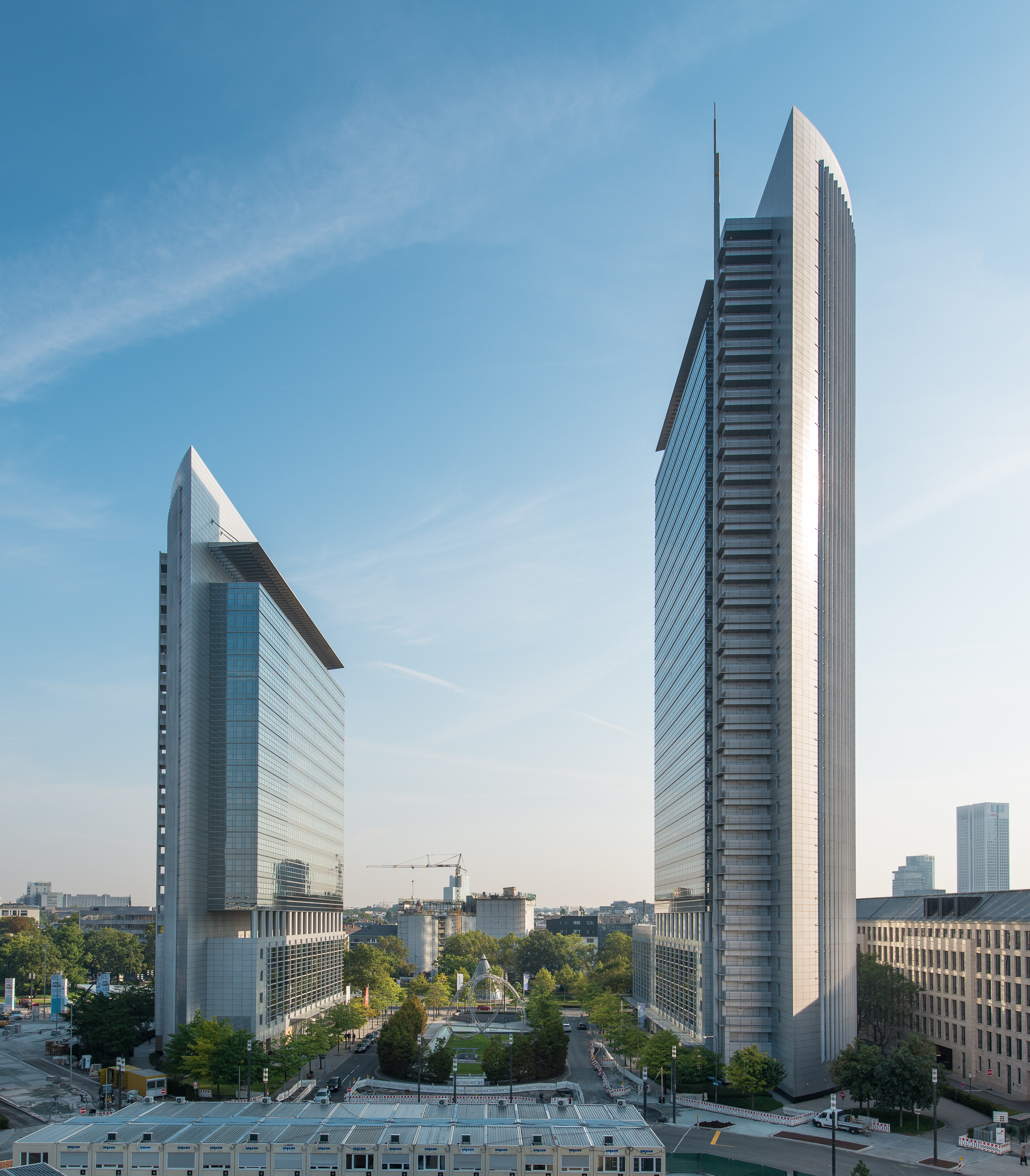
- Kastor (left) and Pollux (right)
- Interactive map of the Kastor und Pollux area
- Alternative names: Forum Frankfurt

General information
- Location: Gallus, Frankfurt, Germany
- Coordinates: 50°6′40.25″N 8°39′18.75″E
- Named for: Castor and Pollux
- Construction started: 1994
- Construction stopped: 1997
- Cost: DM850,000,000

Height
- Height: Kastor: 95 metres (312 ft); Pollux: 130 metres (430 ft)

Technical details
- Floor count: Kastor: 22; Pollux: 33
- Floor area: Kastor: 28,000 square metres (300,000 sq ft); Pollux: 31,500 square metres (339,000 sq ft)

Design and construction
- Architecture firm: Kohn Pedersen Fox

Other information
- Public transit access: Festhalle/Messe; 16 17 Festhalle/Messe

Kastor und Pollux, also known as Forum Frankfurt, are two high-rise buildings in the Gallus district of Frankfurt, Germany. The twin towers, which are 22 and 33 floors, respectively, were named after Castor and Pollux, the Dioscuri of Greek and Roman mythology.

== Location and design ==
Pollux and Kastor were designed by Kohn Pedersen Fox and built between 1994 and 1997. The taller tower, named after Zeus and Leda's son Pollux, is 130 metres (430 ft) tall with 33 storeys and has 31,500 square metres (339,000 sq ft) of floor space. The shorter tower, named after the son of Leda and the mortal king Tyndareus, is 95 metres (312 ft) tall with 22 storeys and has 28,000 square metres (300,000 sq ft) of space. The buildings are located near Messeturm and Tower 185 as well as the train station. Between the two buildings is a green space featuring a fountain and a light sculpture, Synergie, by Swiss artist Christian Herdeg. Kastor was awarded an LEED Gold Certificate in 2014.

== Tenants ==
Zurich Insurance Group has been the main tenant in Pollux since early 2017, working from 17 of the building's 33 floors. TechQuartier, Aon, and Lavazza also have space there. DO Deutsche Office AG and Alstria Office AG both rent space in Kastor.

== See also ==
- List of tallest buildings in Frankfurt
- List of tallest buildings in Germany
