= List of tallest buildings in Dortmund =

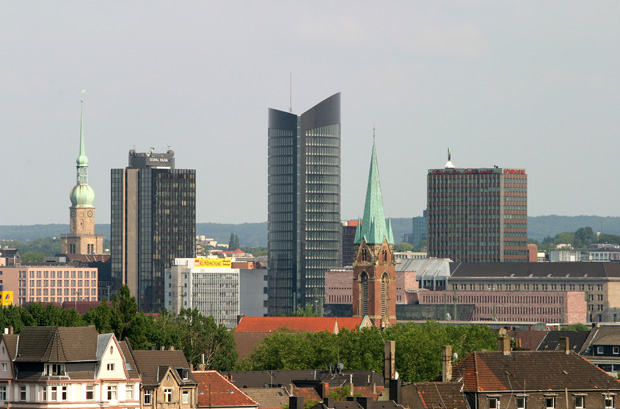
Skyline Dortmund: IWO-Hochhaus, RWE-Tower and Sparkasse-Hochhaus

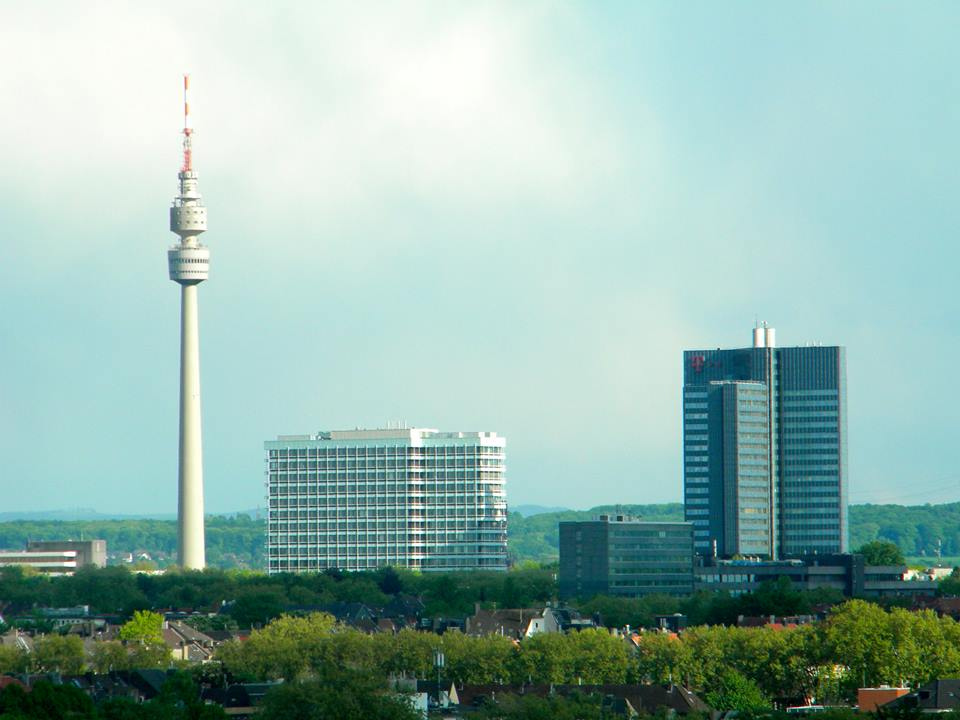
Florianturm, RWE-Hochhaus and Telekom Hochhaus at Westfalenpark

This list of tallest buildings in Dortmund ranks high-rise buildings and important landmarks that reach a height of 50 meters (164 feet). The tallest structure in the city is the 209-meter-high Florianturm, a television tower built in 1959.

Two smaller clusters of tall buildings have emerged in Dortmund. Once in the city center opposite the main train station with RWE-Tower, Sparkassen-Hochhaus, IWO-Hochhaus & Hardenberg City-Center and once at Westfalenpark, with Florianturm, Telekom Hochhaus and RWE Hochhaus. Over the next few years, the cluster at the main station is expecting two new additions of 60 meters each. One high-rise building at Burgtor and one at the old Deutsche Bahn administration building.

Rank	Name	Image	Height m (ft)	Floors	Year completed	Use / Note
	Florianturm		208.56 m (684 ft)		1959	Telecommunications tower, Tallest structure in Dortmund. From 1959 to 2004 - 219.3 m (719 ft) tall
	St. Peter's Church, Dortmund		105 m (344 ft)		1322	
	St. Reinold's Church, Dortmund		104 m (341 ft)		1520	from 1520 to 1661 - 119 m (390 ft) tall
1	RWE-Tower		91 m (299 ft)	22	2005	Tallest building in Dortmund, Height to tip 100 m (328 ft)
2	Telekom-Hochhaus (Dortmund)		88 m (289 ft)	23	1981	Former Seat of Oberpostdirektion Dortmund (Chief Postal Directorate), Today Telekom
3	Westfalentower		86 m (282 ft)	22	2010	Office
4	Harenberg City-Center		70 m (230 ft)	21	1994	Seat of "Harenberg Verlag" (Publisher) and other offices
5	Dortmunder U		70 m (230 ft)	7	1926	Dortmund's Union Brewery, conversion into a creative center.
6	Sparkassen-Hochhaus		67 m (220 ft)	17	1969	Seat of Sparkasse Dortmund
7	Neubau des Continentale Versicherungsverbundes		67 m (220 ft)	16	2025	New building for the Continentale health insurance
8	IWO-Hochhaus		66 m (217 ft)	19	1966	Office, Former Seat of Signal-Versicherungen
9	Mathetower		60 m (197 ft)	11	1968	Technical University of Dortmund
10	Ellipson		60 m (197 ft)	18	2020	
11	Volkswohl Bund Hochhaus		60 m (197 ft)	16	2010	Seat of Volkswohl-Bund Versicherungen.
12	Wohnhochhaus Heiligegartenstraße		60 m (197 ft)	18	1971	Residential
13	Wohnhochhäuser Hannibal II		60 m (197 ft)	18	1975	Residential
14	Wohnhochhaus Clarenberg		60 m (197 ft)	17	1973	Residential
15	Kronenturm		60 m (197 ft)	none	1964	Former fermentation tower of the Kronen Brewery. Conversion to a residential tower is in preparation.
16	Dreier-Hochhaus		54 m (177 ft)	15	1964	Seat of Dreier company
17	RWE Hochhaus am Rheinlanddamm		50 m (164 ft)	14	1972	RWE
18	Wohnhochhäuser Hannibal I		50 m (164 ft)	14	1972	Residential

== Proposed ==
Name	Height (m)	Height (ft)	Floors	Year
Hochhaus am Hauptbahnhof	60	197	18	2028
Quartier Burgtor	60	197	20	2028

== Demolished ==
Name	Image	Height m (ft)	Floors	Opened	Demolished
Wohnhochhaus an der Kielstraße		60 m (197 ft)	18	1969	Residential
Volkswohl-Bund-Hochhaus		60 m (197 ft)	14	1973	Former Seat of Volkswohl-Bund Versicherungen, Demolished in 2008

== See also ==
- List of tallest buildings in Germany
- List of tallest structures in Germany
