= Maritim Clubhotel =

Skyscraper in Timmendorfer Strand, Germany

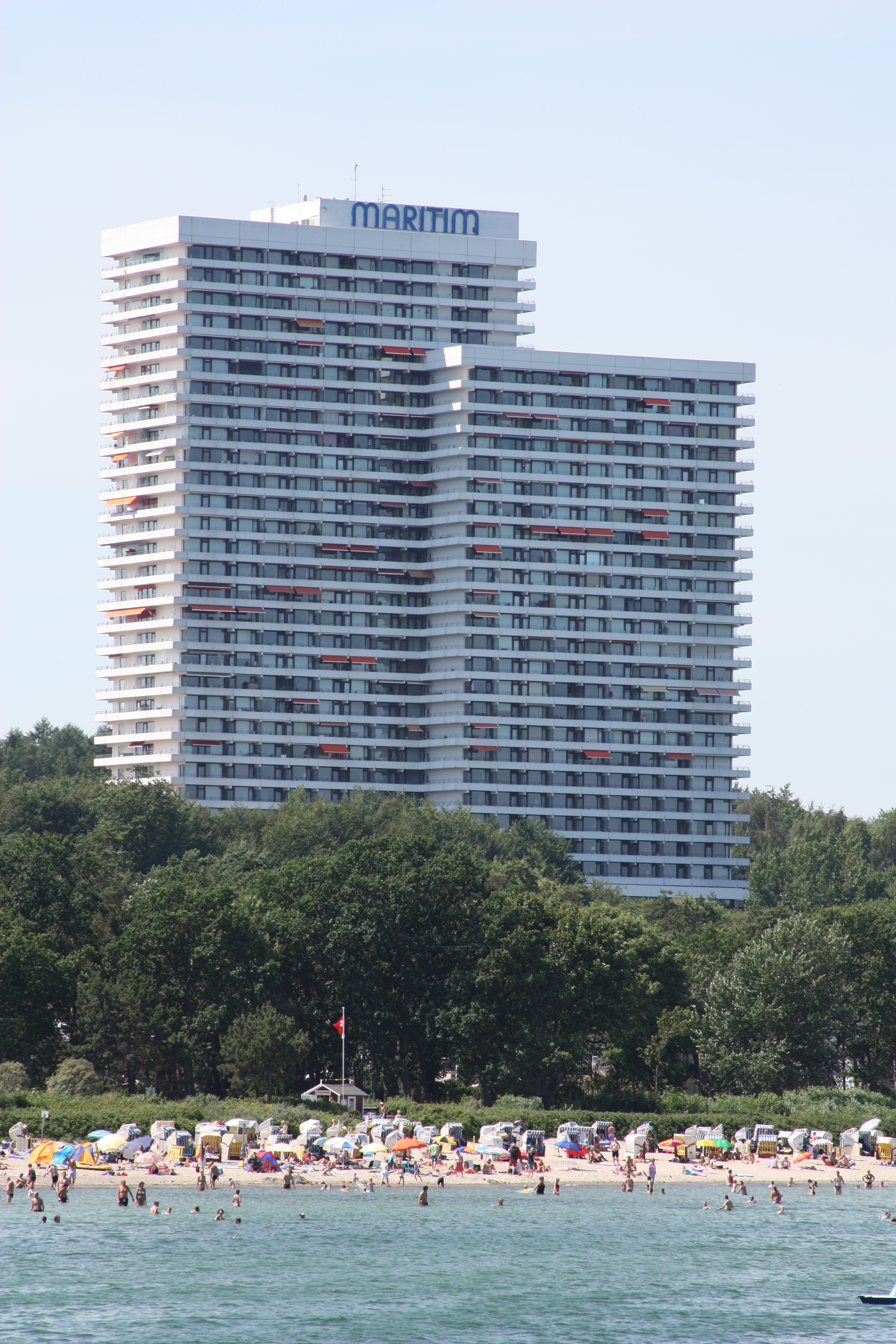
- Interactive map of the Maritim Clubhotel area

General information
- Status: Completed
- Type: Hotel
- Location: Timmendorfer Strand, Germany, 26 An der Waldkapelle, Timmendorfer Strand, Germany
- Coordinates: 54.00563°N 10.77101°E
- Construction started: 1972
- Completed: 1974
- Owner: Maritim Hotels

Height
- Roof: 101 m (331 ft)

Technical details
- Structural system: Concrete
- Floor count: 32

Design and construction
- Architect: Günter Reinhardt

The Maritim Clubhotel also known as the Plaza Premium Timmendorfer Strand is a high-rise hotel in Timmendorfer Strand, Germany. Built between 1972 and 1974, the building stands at 101 m (331 ft) tall with 32 floors and is the current 89th tallest building in Germany.

== Architecture ==
The building is located in the township of Timmendorfer Strand and, with a height of 101 metres and 32 floors, is the second tallest skyscraper and hotel in Schleswig-Holstein after the Maritim Travemünde in the Lübeck district of Travemünde (119 metres) and one of the tallest hotels in Germany. The lower five floors contain hotel rooms, and the floors above apartments. The skyscraper also has its own access road, tennis courts and a swimming pool, and houses a total of 191 rentable rooms.

== Ownership ==
Until 2021, the entire Maritim ClubHotel Timmendorfer Strand belonged to the Maritim Hotelgesellschaft, which also owns the Maritim Travemünde. Since July 1, 2021, however, it has only operated the apartments on the upper floors. The five lower floors that house the hotel were sold to the Plaza Hotelgroup due to a drop in sales during the COVID-19 pandemic. Since then, the hotel has been called PLAZA Premium Timmendorfer Strand.

== See also ==
- List of tallest buildings in Germany
