= List of tallest buildings in Essen =

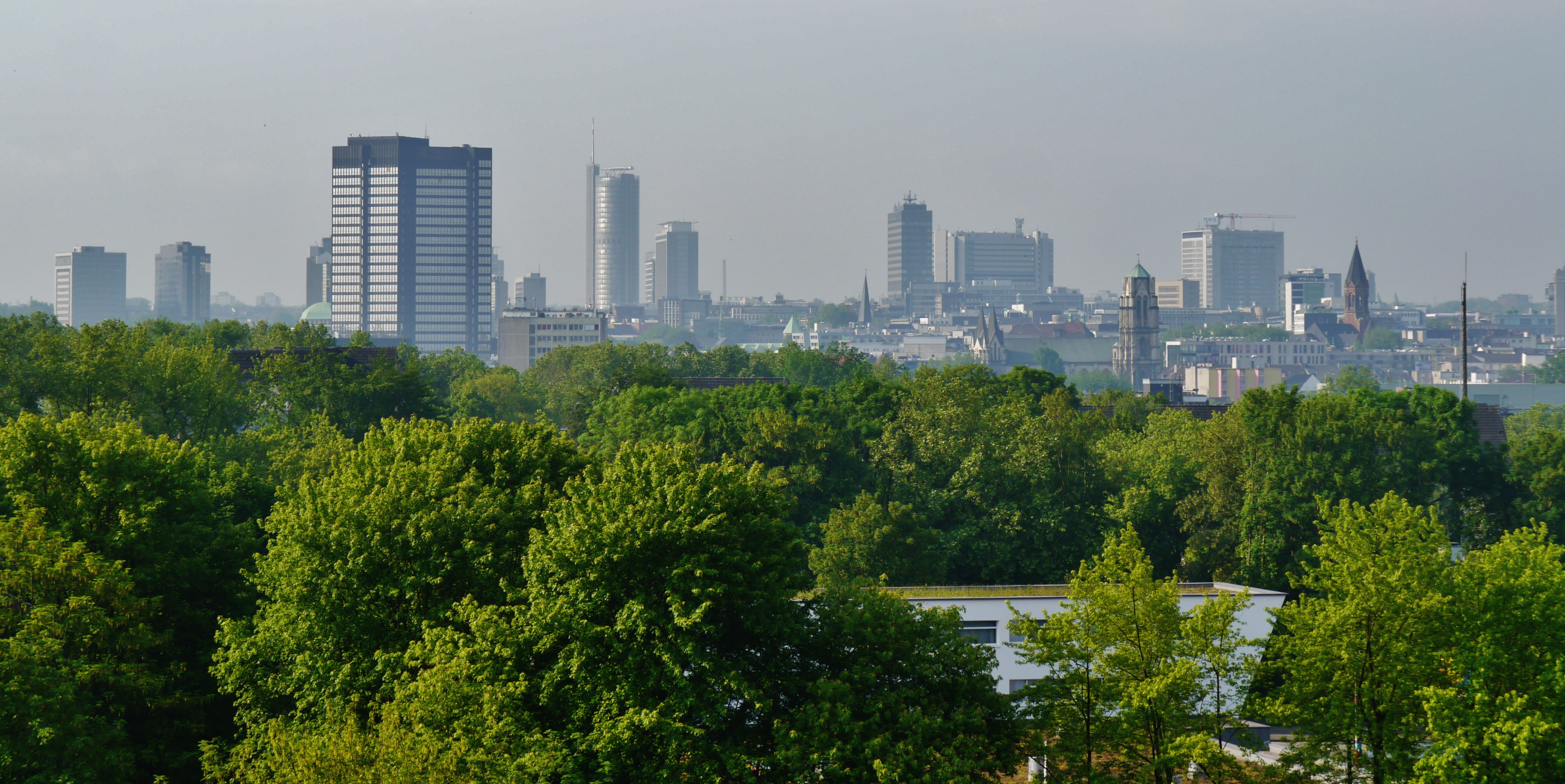
Skyline of Essen

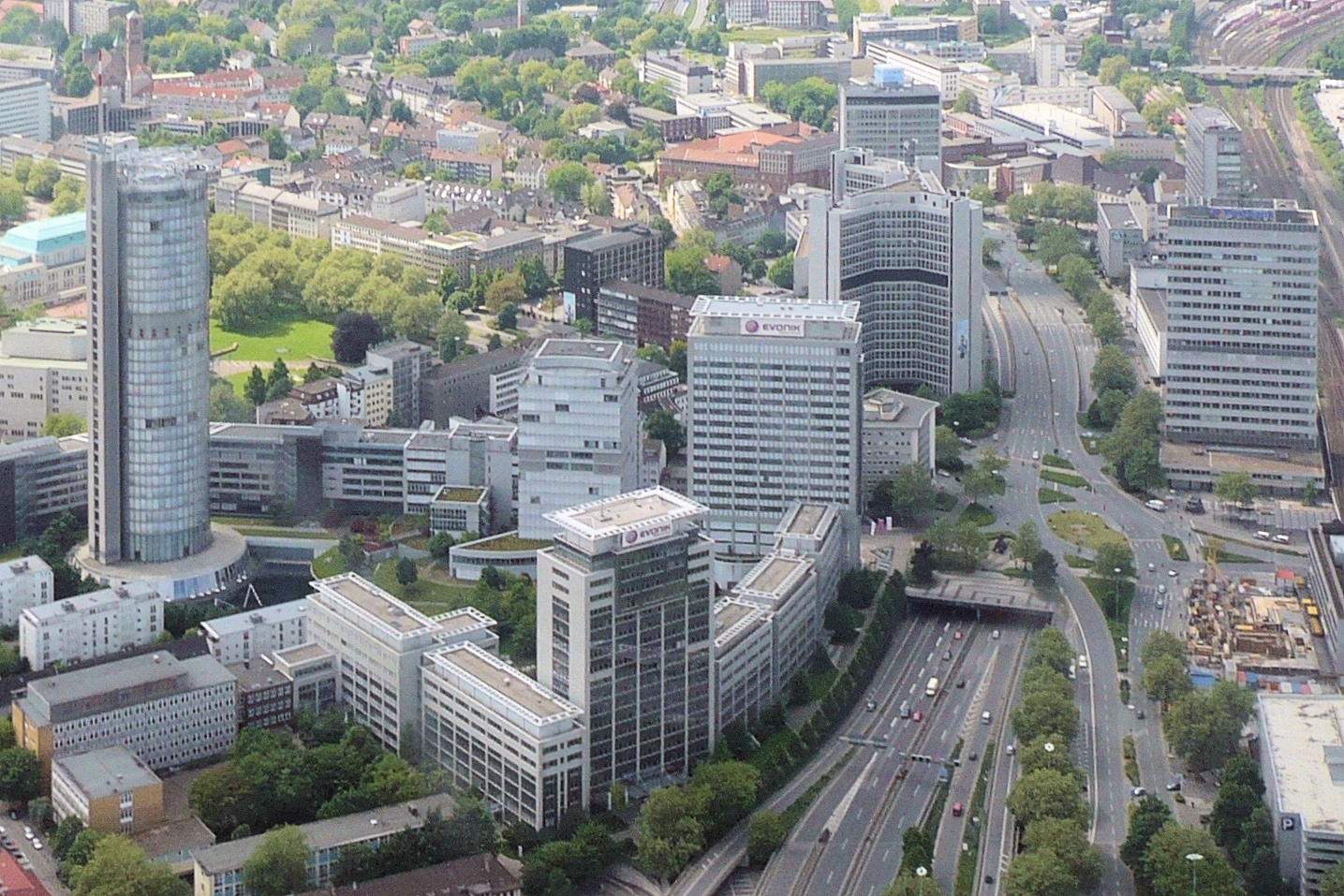
Skyline in Essen's southern district looking east: Westenergie tower on the left, Kruppstrasse 5 in the middle at the back, former Huyssenallee 2 in front, RellingHaus II + I in front, Postbank high-rise on the right, RUHR Tower behind it

This list of tallest buildings in Essen ranks high-rise buildings and important landmarks that reach a height of 40 meters (131 feet).

Most of the high-rise buildings are concentrated in the southern district south of the city center. Construction of the Rheinstahl buildings began here in 1958, followed shortly afterwards by the RWE building at Kruppstrasse 5, making Essen the first city in Germany to establish a skyline. Frankfurt am Main did not follow until 1962.

Outside Essen's southern district, the city hall and, more recently, the corporate headquarters of Thyssen-Krupp and E.ON Ruhrgas were later added.

The Westenergie Tower in Essen is the tallest office building in the Ruhr region.

In March 2024, the city of Essen adopted a high-rise development concept. This defines suitable areas for new high-rise buildings in the urban area. These are located to the east of the city center on the Schützenbahn and south of the main train station as well as to the west and north of the city center in the area of Weststadt and the university.

Rank	Name	Image	Height m (ft)	Floors	Year completed	Use / Note
1	Westenergie-Turm		127 m (417 ft)	30	1996	Tallest skyscraper in Düsseldorf, Height to tip 162 m (531 ft); Former headquarters of RWE AG
2	Essen City Hall		106 m (348 ft)	23	1979	Seat of the city administration.
3	RellingHaus II		100 m (328 ft)	21	1999	Headquarters of Evonik Industries
4	Postbank-Hochhaus		91.59 m (300 ft)	19	1967	Office
5	Hochhaus Kruppstraße 5		85 m (279 ft)	22	1961	Office, former seat of RWE Deutschland AG
6	RUHR Tower		76.9 m (252 ft)	22	1961	Office, former headquarters of ThyssenKrupp
7	Bochumer Straße 64–66		69.38 m (228 ft)	22	1974	Residential
8	E.ON (1)		63 m (207 ft)	15	2010	Headquarters of E.ON
8	E.ON (2)		63 m (207 ft)	15	2010	Headquarters of E.ON
10	RUHRTURM		61 m (200 ft)	15	1973	Hotel, Office
11	RellingHaus I		60.45 m (198 ft)	17	1996	Headquarters of Evonik Industries
12	PHIL (Huyssen Quartier Essen)		60 m (197 ft)	18	2022	Residential
13	Gebäude der Universitätsklinik		57.6 m (189 ft)	14	1973	Building of the University Hospital
14	Rellinghauser Str. 27		57 m (187 ft)	15	1996	Office
14	Magna Tower		57 m (187 ft)	15	1963	Office
14	Schulzstraße 24		57 m (187 ft)	15	1963	Residential
17	Weststadt-Türme		54 m (177 ft)	15	1992	Office
18	Gildehof-Center		52 m (171 ft)	15	1988	Office
19	Premier Inn Hotel		51 m (167 ft)	13	2020	Hotel
20	Thyssenkrupp-Hauptquartier		50 m (164 ft)	14	1963	Headquarters of ThyssenKrupp
21	Gildehofstraße 1		49 m (161 ft)	16		Office
22	Hollestraße 7c		47.85 m (157 ft)	16		Office
23	Hollestraße 7		45.1 m (148 ft)	14		Office
24	Gildehofstraße 2		43.89 m (144 ft)	15		Office
25	Gildehofstraße 2		41.15 m (135 ft)	13	1976	Office

== Proposed ==
Name	Height (m)	Height (ft)	Floors	Year
High Square Essen	139	456	36	2028
Essen Eins	~80	~262	20	Unknown
BürgerRatHaus	60	197	16	Unknown
Zech-Haus	50	164	13	Unknown

== Demolished ==
Name	Image	Height m (ft)	Floors	Opened	Demolished
Hochhaus Huyssenallee 2		78 m (256 ft)	19	1980	2022

== See also ==
- List of tallest buildings in Germany
- List of tallest structures in Germany
