= Die Pyramide =

High-rise building built in 1994/95 and located in the Berlin

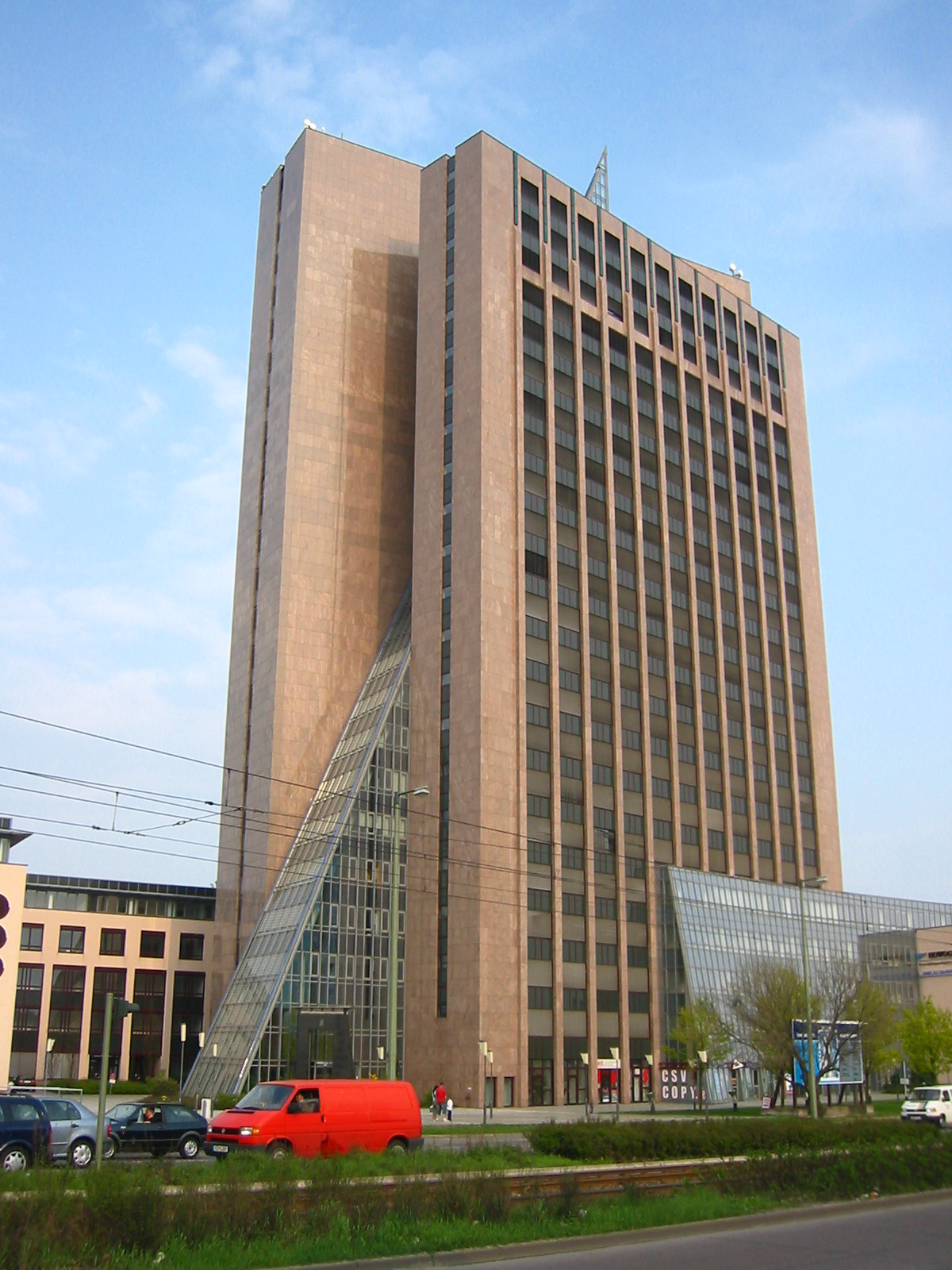
- Interactive map of the Die Pyramide area

General information
- Location: Marzahn, Berlin, Germany
- Coordinates: 52°32′5″N 13°31′7″E
- Construction started: 1994
- Completed: 1995

Height
- Roof: 100 m (330 ft)

Technical details
- Floor count: 23
- Floor area: 43,800 m^{2} (471,000 sq ft)

Die Pyramide (The Pyramid) is a high-rise building built in 1994/95 and located in the Berlin region of Marzahn-Hellersdorf, district of Marzahn, at the Rhinstraße / Landsberger Allee intersection. The office building and adjacent outbuildings have a combined floor space of 43,800 square metres. Die Pyramide was built by the Fundus-Gruppe real estate company of Düren and cost approximately €145 million to build. The official completion date was 17 January 1995. At a height of 100 meters, it is the tallest building in the suburb.

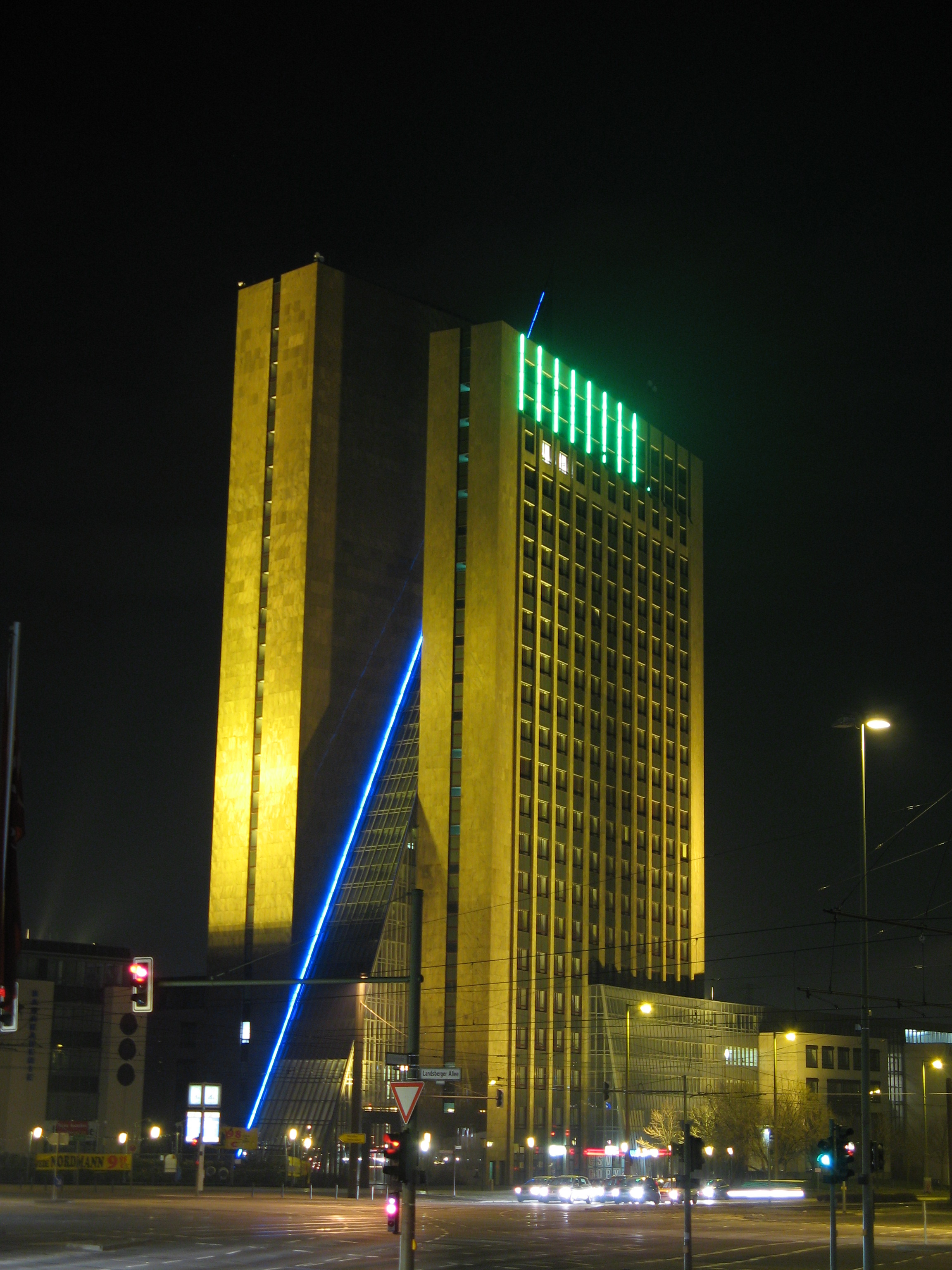
The chronometer at night

== Description ==
The double-winged main building consists of 23 floors, with a striking architectural design, incorporating a pyramid-like glass facade in an otherwise ordinary building. The pyramid itself acts as an oversized chronometer. On the upper floors of the main building's west face, green light strips show the hour and minute. The pyramid-shaped glass facade on the north face displays the seconds (blue light strips; for each second an additional light appears to the left and right of the facade). To mark the minute, a flash of light is projected from the building's tip. The pyramid is considered Europe's largest clock. The clock was out of service from early 2006 until December 2007, and has been again since the beginning of 2009.

== Ownership and revenues ==
The Fundus-Gruppe established a closed real estate fund to finance the building. However, due to underwhelming rental income, the investors accused the Fundus-Gruppe of misrepresentation. They claimed that the rentable space had been represented as too large in the prospectus and therefore the rental income had been overestimated. The Fundus-Gruppe denied these allegations.

In 2006, the investor sold the building to the Comer Group International. The British real estate company established its continental European branch in Die Pyramide, occupying about a third of the space with 350 employees. A business hotel of 70 rooms has been established on two floors of the adjoining building; the smaller tenants gradually withdrew from the building to enable this change.

The cultural department of the Marzahn-Hellersdorf district government maintains an exhibition center in Die Pyramide that is also used for larger cultural events.

== See also ==
- List of tallest buildings in Germany
