= List of tallest buildings in Braunschweig =

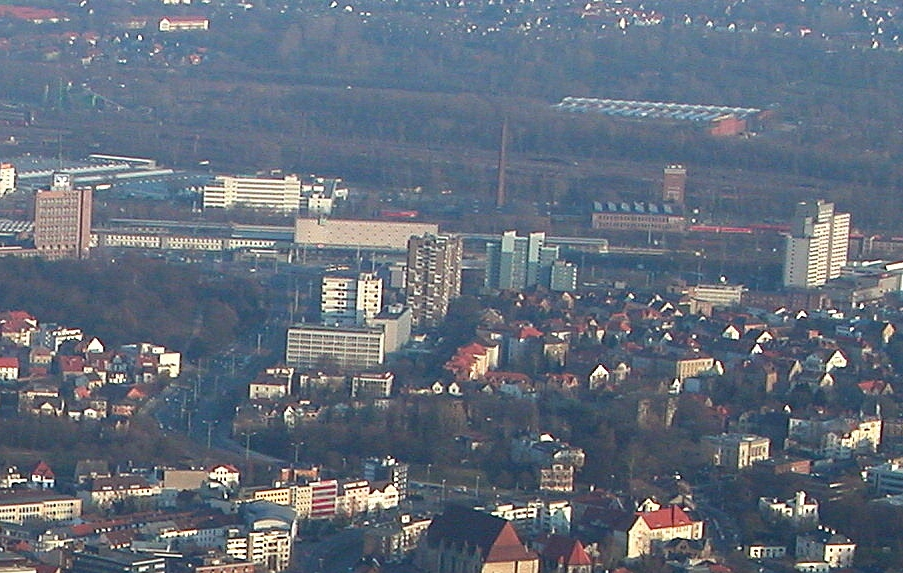
High-rise buildings near Berliner Platz

This list of tallest buildings in Braunschweig (or Brunswick) ranks high-rise buildings and important landmarks that reach a height of 38 meters (125 feet). The tallest structure in the city is the Chimney of the BS Energy factory in the center at 198 meters and the 154.65-meter-high Fernmeldeturm Broitzem, a television tower built in 1971, is the second tallest structure in the city. Most of Braunschweig's high-rise buildings are located around Berliner Platz at the main train station and the adjacent Willy-Brandt-Platz, which was named on December 18, 2013, to mark the centenary of Willy Brandt's birth. Braunschweig's newest and tallest high-rise buildings are located in the new office complex called BraWoPark. Braunschweig's tallest building, the 90-meters-high Posthochhaus, was built from 1986 to 1990 according to the plans of architects Gerkan, Marg and Partners.

Rank	Name	Image	Height m (ft)	Floors	Year completed	Use / Note
	Heizkraftwerk-Mitte	Heizkraftwerk-Mitte	198.2 m (650 ft)		1986	Chimney
	Fernmeldeturm Broitzem		154.65 m (507 ft)		1971	Telecommunications tower
	St. Andreas		93 m (305 ft)		1532, 1742	Tallest church tower
	St. Katharinen		82.18 m (270 ft)		1379	
1	Posthochhaus (Business-Centers I - BrawoPark)		90 m (295 ft)	15	1990	Built as an administrative high-rise for the German Federal Post Office. Roof height: 65 m (213 ft)
2	Business-Centers II - BrawoPark		80 m (262 ft)	20	2015	Office
3	Business-Centers III - BrawoPark		68 m (223 ft)	19	2023	Office
3	Hochhaus der Braunschweigischen Landessparkasse		68 m (223 ft)	15	1974	Seat of Braunschweigische Landessparkasse
5	Hochhaus am Schwarzen Berge		66 m (217 ft)	22	1969	Residential
6	Ring-Center		62 m (203 ft)	18	1975	Residential
	Braunschweig Town Hall		61 m (200 ft)		1900	
7	Atrium-Hochhaus I		59 m (194 ft)	20	1971	Residential
7	TU-Hochhaus, Mühlenpfordtstraße		59 m (194 ft)	13	1976	Home of the Institute for Building and Solar Technology and other institutes of the Faculty of Architecture at the Technical University of Braunschweig.
9	TU-Hochhaus, Pockelsstraße		58.7 m (193 ft)	16	1956	Braunschweig University of Technology
10	Hochhaus Jenastieg		56 m (184 ft)	17	1969	Residential
11	TU-Hochhaus, Hans-Sommer-Straße		54 m (177 ft)	Braunschweig University of Technology	1974	New technical town hall
12	Atrium-Hochhaus II		48 m (157 ft)	14	1971	Residential
12	Atrium-Hochhaus III		48 m (157 ft)	14	1971	Residential
14	Haus der Wissenschaft		47 m (154 ft)	8	1937	House of Science
15 – 17	Hochhäuser Emsstraße 12, 14, 16		43 m (141 ft)	14	1974	Residential
18	Hochhaus Berliner Platz 2A		42 m (138 ft)	13		Residential
18	Hochhaus Augustinum		42 m (138 ft)	13		Residential
20	Bürohaus Wendenring		40 m (131 ft)	12		Office
20	Hochhaus Celler Straße		40 m (131 ft)	12	1960s	Residential
22	Studentenwohnanlage APM (Affenfelsen)		39 m (128 ft)	14	1976	Student residence
22	Kurt-Schumacher-Straße 18		39 m (128 ft)	12	1978	Residential
24	Hochhaus Theodor Heuss		38 m (125 ft)	12	1974	Residential

== See also ==
- List of tallest buildings in Germany
- List of tallest structures in Germany
