= List of tallest buildings in Jena =

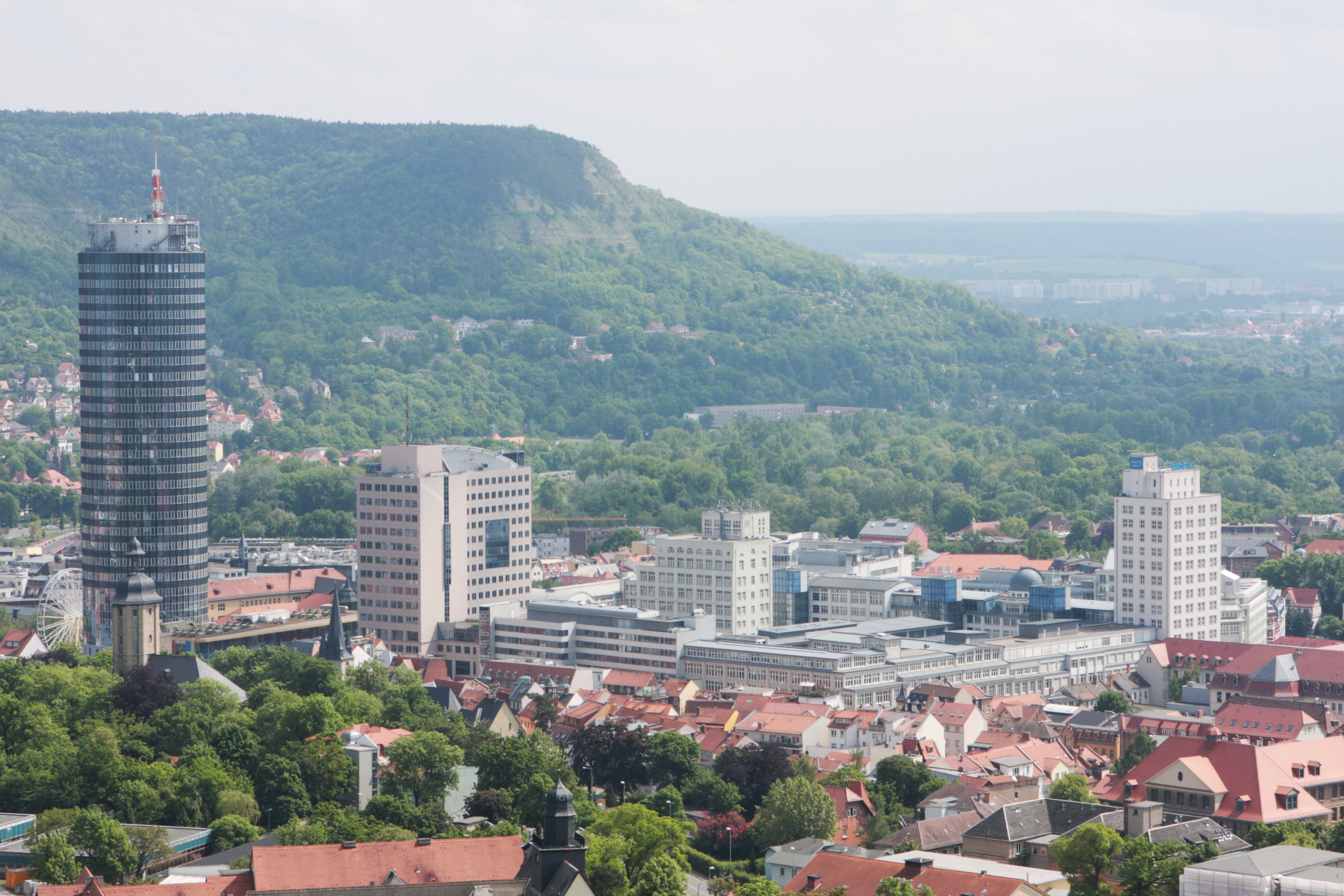
Jena "Skyline": from left to right – JenTower (144.5 m), Bau 59 (67 m), Bau 15 (42 m) and Bau 36 (66 m)

This list of tallest buildings in Jena ranks high-rise buildings that reach a height of 40 meters (130 feet). The tallest skyscraper in the city is the 144.5-meter-high JenTower, built in 1972.

In 1915, Germany's first "skyscraper", the 42-meter-high (138-foot) Bau 15, was constructed in Jena. The building, designed by Friedrich Pützer, was used by Zeiss as a production facility. In 1936, the architects Hans Hertlein and Georg Steinmetz built a new administrative building for Zeisswerke, known as Building 36. In 1945, Allied bombing raids destroyed large parts of Jena's city center.

After the end of the Second World War, the city council adopted the “Reconstruction Plan for the University City of Jena”. Construction of the high-rise research building began in 1959. On April 30, 1970, the foundation stone for the 26-storey research tower designed by Hermann Henselmann was laid in the immediate vicinity. It was inaugurated on October 2, 1972. The tower was renovated between 1999 and 2001. It was then used by Intershop Communications AG. In November 2004, the Intershop Tower was renamed the Jentower. At 144.5 meters, the tower is the tallest building in eastern Germany.

Rank	Name	Image	Height m (ft)	Floors	Year completed	Use / Note
1	JenTower		144.5 m (474 ft)	31	1972	Tallest skyscraper in Jena, Renovated in 2001 and increased by two storeys. With antenna spire 159.6 m (524 ft) tall.
	St. Michael		75 m (246 ft)		1557	
2	Bau 59		67 m (220 ft)	16	1962 (Refurbishment in 1993)	Former research high-rise of the VEB Carl Zeiss Jena
3	Bau 36		66 m (217 ft)	15	1935	Seat of Jenoptik AG
4	Bau 15		42 m (138 ft)	11	1915	Jena's and Germany's first "skyscraper".

== Under Construction ==
Name	Height (m)	Height (ft)	Floors	Year
Inselplatz-Campus	50	164	15	2025

== Proposed ==
Name	Height (m)	Height (ft)	Floors	Year
Bebauung des Eichplatzes I	66.5	218	20	2027
dotSource Campus	65	213	16	Unknown
Bebauung des Eichplatzes II	50	164	14	2027
Steinweg Tower (Quartier 22)	49	161	15	Unknown

== See also ==
- List of tallest buildings in Germany
- List of tallest structures in Germany
