= Colonia-Haus =

45-storey, 147 m (482 ft) skyscraper completed in 1973 in Cologne, Germany

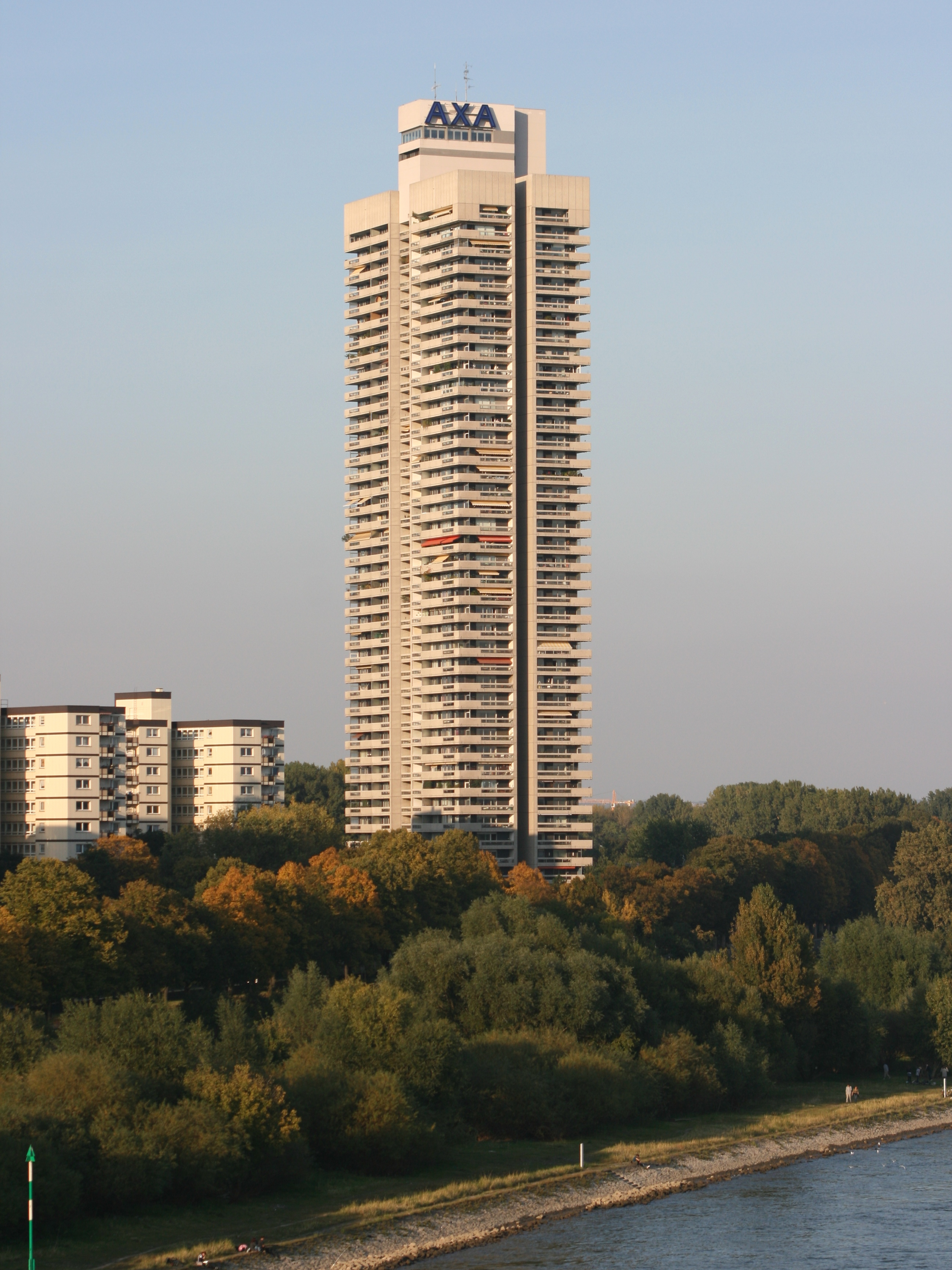
- Interactive map of the Colonia-Haus area

General information
- Status: Completed
- Type: Residential apartments
- Location: An der Schanz 2 Cologne, Germany
- Coordinates: 50°57′38″N 6°58′57″E
- Construction started: 1970
- Completed: 1973

Height
- Antenna spire: 155 m (509 ft)
- Roof: 147 m (482 ft)

Technical details
- Floor count: 42

Design and construction
- Architect: Henrik Busch

Other information
- Number of units: 352

Colonia-Haus is a 45-storey, 147 m (482 ft) skyscraper completed in 1973 in the Riehl district of Cologne, Germany. Upon completion in 1973, it was the tallest residential-only building in Germany until the 2020 completion of the Grand Tower in Frankfurt. Colonia-Haus has 45 floors with 373 units including 352 one-and multi-room apt-flats in size from 35 to 118 m^{2} (380 to 1,270 sq ft) on floors 3 to 41.

== Technology and equipment ==
The tower is equipped with four-speed elevators each for up to 18 people, garbage chutes on all floors, partial air-conditioning in the apartments and additional heating. They are joined by a parking garage, several bicycle storage rooms with washing machines, tumble dryers and mangles.

The pool on the ground floor overlooking the Rhine measures 8 meters x 15 meters. In addition, there is a separate children's pool. The house also has a Finnish sauna with plunge pool and relaxation room, a fitness room and table tennis facilities.

A 250 m^{2} (2,700 sq ft) grocery store, a restaurant with a terrace overlooking the Rhine, and a bar and bowling alleys, a doctor's office and a municipal kindergarten are all on the ground floor.

== Appearance ==
The skyscraper was known by its advertising slogan of Colonia, with the insurance group, the Cologne Colonia recruited who was acquired in 1997 by the AXA Group. Accordingly, it was replaced in 1998 the advertising slogan at the highest point of the house by AXA, with the name of the house remained unchanged.

== See also ==
- List of tallest buildings in Germany
