= Friedrich-Engelhorn-Hochhaus =

Friedrich-Engelhorn-Hochhaus BASF E 100
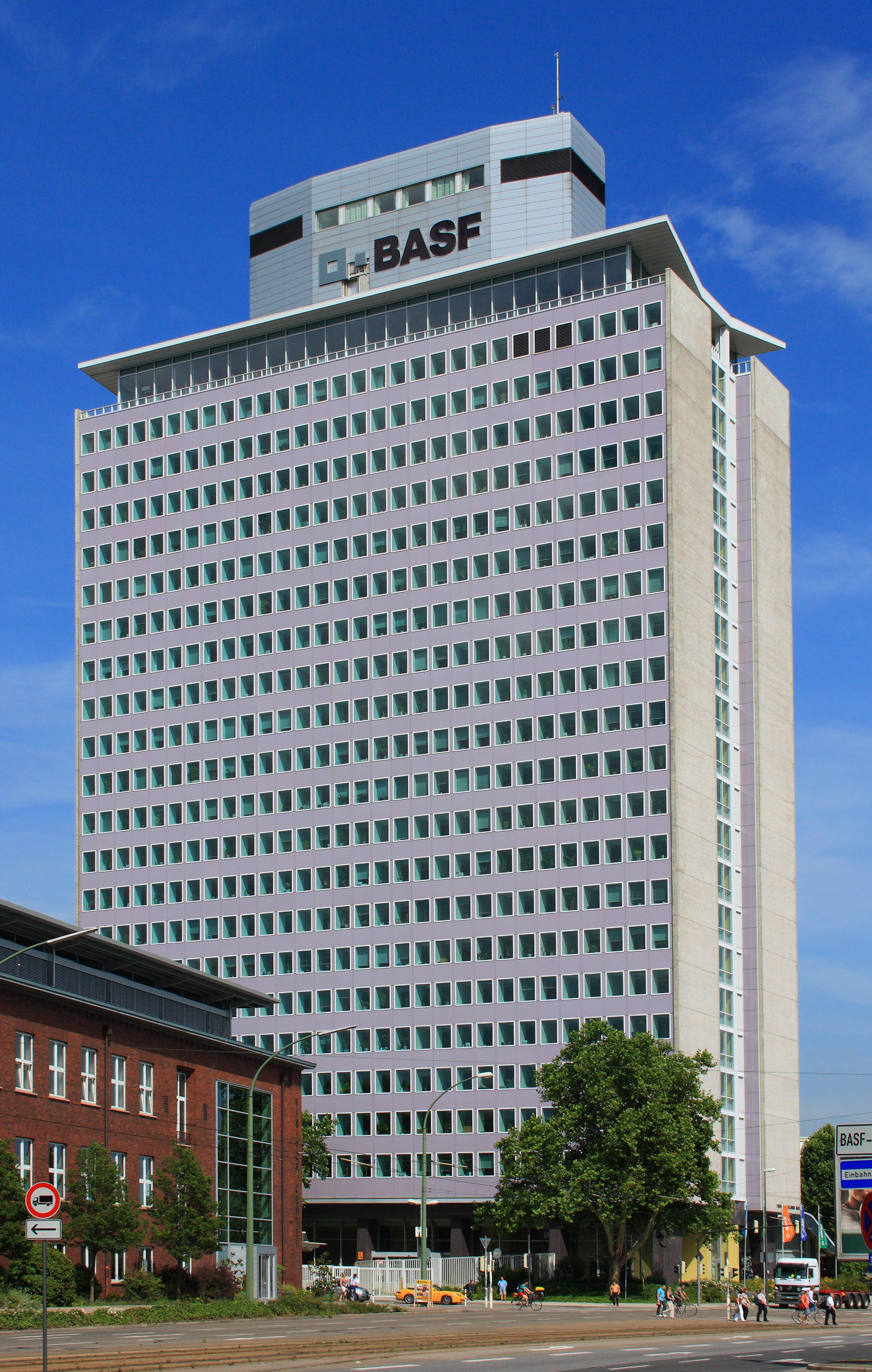
- Interactive map of the Friedrich-Engelhorn-Hochhaus; BASF E 100 area
- Alternative names: BASF Hochhaus

General information
- Type: Commercial offices
- Architectural style: Modernism
- Location: Carl-Bosch-Strasse 44; Ludwigshafen, Germany
- Coordinates: 49.495972°N 8.432167°E
- Construction started: 1953
- Completed: 1957
- Demolished: 2013–2014

Height
- Roof: 101.63 m (333.4 ft)

Technical details
- Floor count: 28
- Floor area: 23,266 m^{2} (250,430 sq ft)

Design and construction
- Architects: HPP Hentrich-Petschnigg & Partner KG

The Friedrich-Engelhorn-Hochhaus was a 28-storey, 101.63 m (333.4 ft) skyscraper in Ludwigshafen am Rhein, Germany. When completed in 1957 as the headquarters for BASF, it was the tallest building in Germany. Demolition of the building began in late 2013 and was completed in February 2014; new headquarters for BASF will be built on the site.

== See also ==
- List of tallest buildings in Germany
