= Westend Gate =

Skyscraper in Frankfurt, Germany

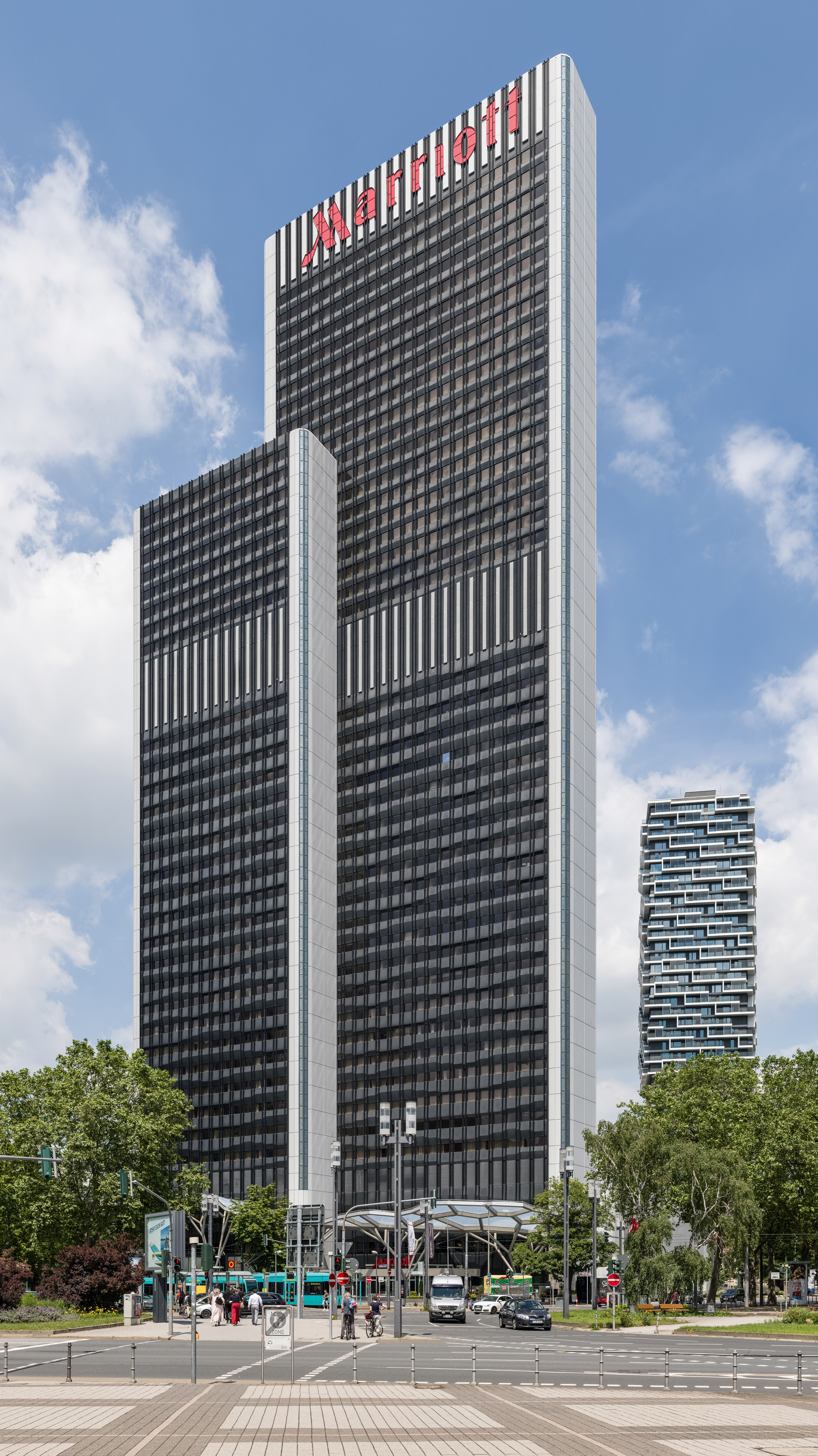
- Interactive map of the Westend Gate area
- Former names: Plaza Büro Center; PBC; Hochhaus Senckenberganlage

General information
- Type: Commercial offices Hotel
- Architectural style: Modernism
- Location: Hamburger Allee 2 Frankfurt; Hesse, Germany
- Coordinates: 50°06′51″N 8°39′01″E
- Completed: 1972–1976
- Cost: US$500 million

Height
- Roof: 159 m (522 ft)

Technical details
- Floor count: 47; 3 below ground

Design and construction
- Architect: Siegfried Hoyer
- Engineer: BGS Ingenieursozietät; Philipp Holzmann; Wayss & Freytag

Other information
- Number of rooms: 588
- Parking: 679
- Public transit access: Festhalle/Messe; 16 17 Festhalle/Messe

Westend Gate, formerly known as Plaza Büro Center, is a 47-storey, 159 m (522 ft) skyscraper in the Westend-Süd district of Frankfurt, Germany. It was the tallest building in Germany from 1976 until 1978 when it was surpassed by the Silberturm, which is also located in Frankfurt.

The Westend Gate is located just across the street from the Frankfurt Trade Fair grounds and near the Naturmuseum Senckenberg and the Bockenheim Campus of the Goethe University Frankfurt.

The structure consists of 2 slabs plus a narrow wing attached to the east side. It was renamed Westend Gate in 2011, when it was completely renovated as a green building.

The lower half of the tower contains offices, while floors 26–44 are a hotel, originally the CP Frankfurt Plaza Hotel, known since 1989 as the Frankfurt Marriott.

== See also ==
- List of tallest buildings in Frankfurt
- List of tallest buildings in Germany
- List of tallest buildings in Europe
