= List of tallest buildings in Bochum =

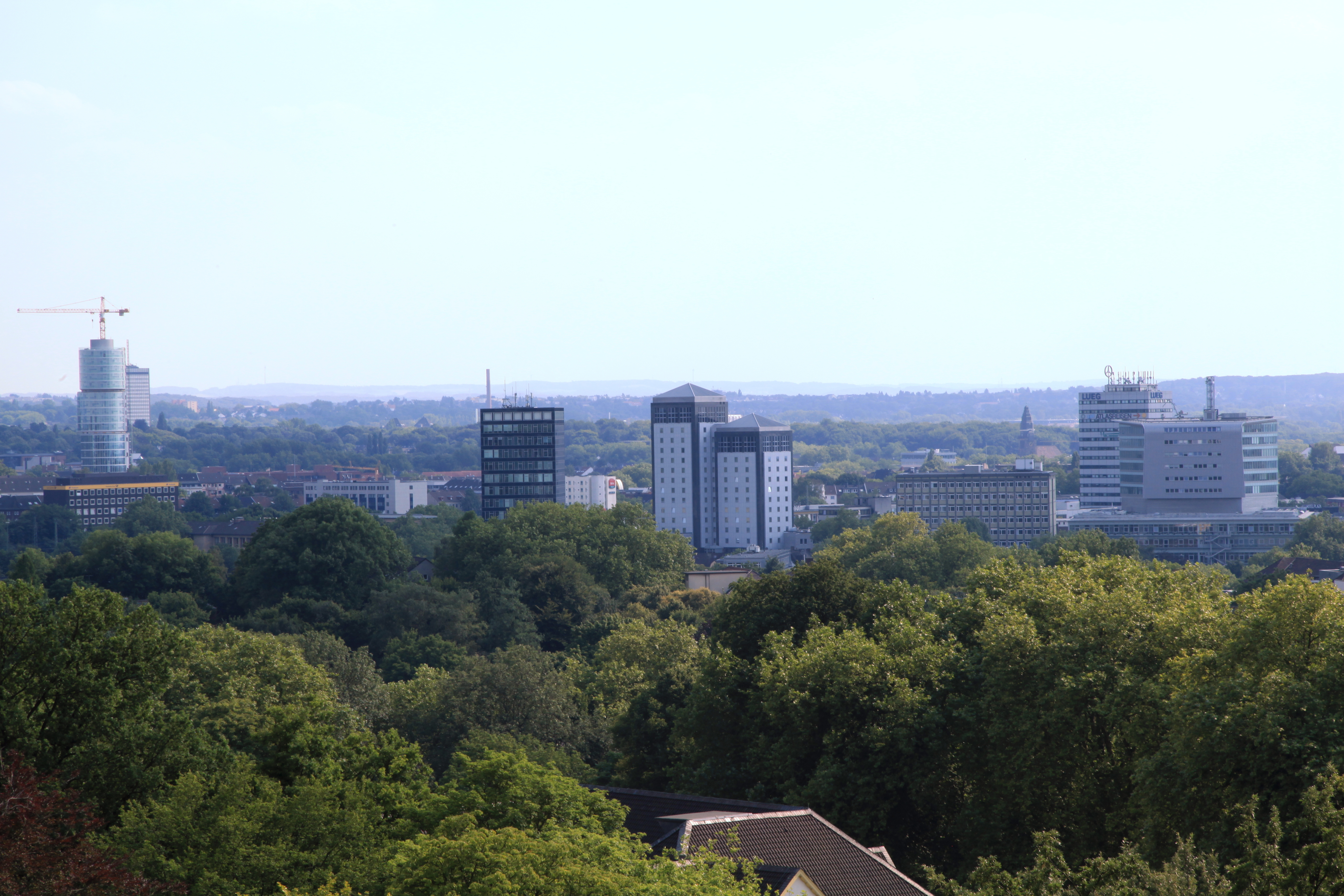
From left to right: Exzenterhaus, Stadtwerke-Hochhaus, Mercure-Hotel, Europahaus and Bochumer Fenster

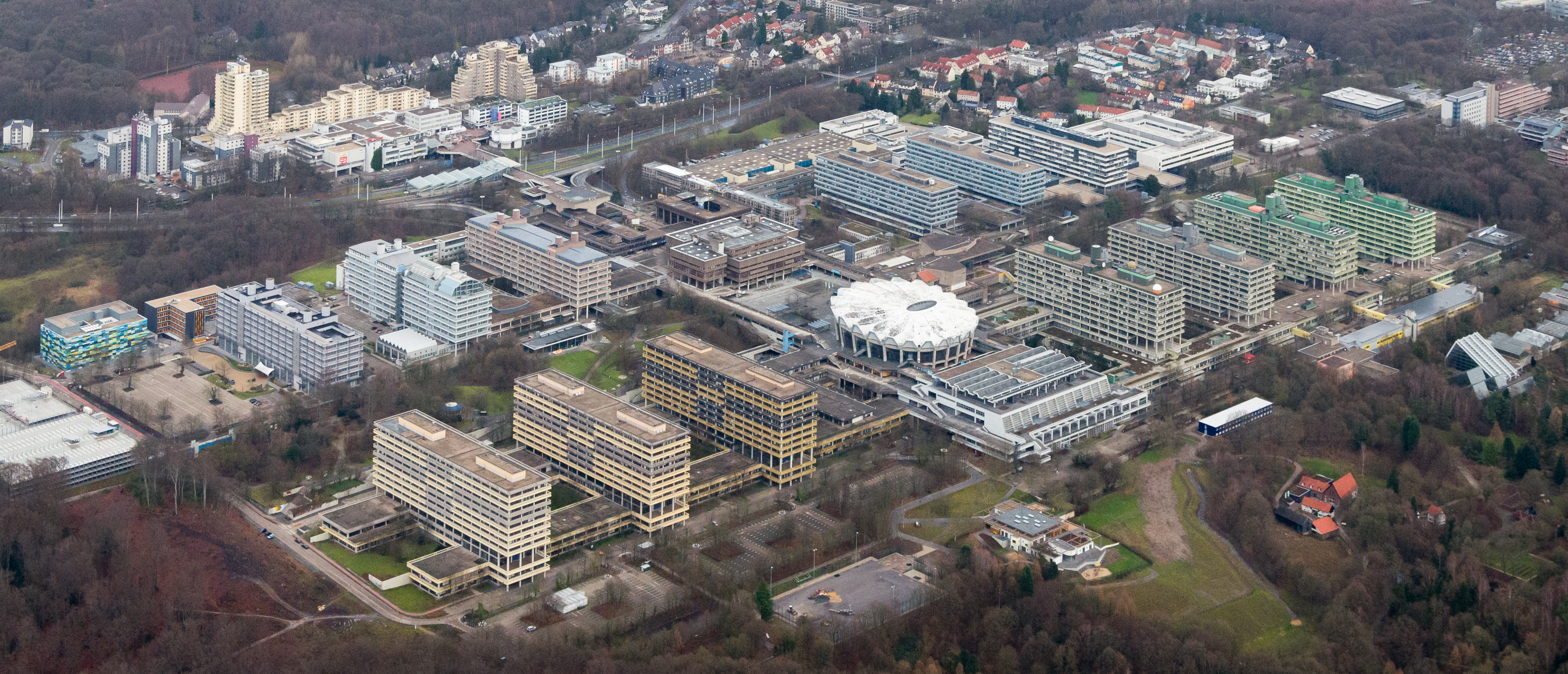
Ruhr University

This list of tallest buildings in Bochum ranks high-rise buildings and important landmarks that reach a height of 50 meters (164 feet).

The Europa-Haus opened in the southern city center in 1962 and is still a striking feature of the cityscape today. Between 1971 and 1975, four more buildings were added, including the Terrassen-Hochhaus, which is still Bochum's tallest residential building. Outside the Bochum city ring and the Querenburg district, on the development axis from the city ring to the university, the Exzenter-Haus followed in 2013. The Exzenter-Haus in Bochum is the tallest office building in the Central Ruhr region. In Bochum itself, there are currently two buildings that reach or exceed a height of 70 meters.

Rank	Name	Image	Height m (ft)	Floors	Year completed	Use / Note
1.	Exzenterhaus		88.6 m (291 ft)	23	2013	Tallest high-rise building in Bochum. Height to tip: 90.5 m (297 ft)
2.	Bomin-Haus		75.89 m (249 ft)	20	1975	Office
3.	Terrassen-Hochhaus im Uni-Center		65.8 m (216 ft)	21	1973	Residential
4.	Europahaus		60.5 m (198 ft)	16	1962	Office
4	Mercure-Hotel		60.5 m (198 ft)	16	1995	Hotel
6	Stadtwerkegebäude		60 m (197 ft)	16	2005	Headquarters of Stadtwerke Bochum
7	Schlegelturm		58 m (190 ft)	18	1927	Former brewery tower converted into an office tower
8	Knappschaftskrankenhaus		55 m (180 ft)	16	1971	University Hospital
9	Bochumer Fenster		52.9 m (174 ft)	12	2002	Residential
10	Naturwissenschaften Building A (NA)		52.5 m (172 ft)	12	1969	Part of Ruhr University Bochum
10	Naturwissenschaften Building B (NB)		52.5 m (172 ft)	12	1969	Part of Ruhr University Bochum
10	Naturwissenschaften Building C (NC)		52.5 m (172 ft)	12	1969	Part of Ruhr University Bochum
10	Naturwissenschaften Building D (ND)		52.5 m (172 ft)	12	1969	Part of Ruhr University Bochum
14	Uni-Center Ost		52 m (171 ft)	16	1971	Residential building in the Uni-Center
15	Appartementhaus Lohring		52 m (171 ft)	13	1966	Residential
16	Studentenwohnheim Erlenkamp		51.5 m (169 ft)	13	1974	Residential
16	Hustadtring 73		51.5 m (169 ft)	14	1969	Residential
18	Geisteswissenschaften Gebäude A (GA)		51.1 m (168 ft)	12	1969	Part of Ruhr University Bochum
18	Geisteswissenschaften Gebäude B (GB)		51.1 m (168 ft)	12	1969	Part of Ruhr University Bochum
18	Geisteswissenschaften Gebäude C (GC)		51.1 m (168 ft)	12	1969	Part of Ruhr University Bochum
21	Studentenwohnheim Uni-Center		50.5 m (166 ft)	15	1974	Residential
22	Hustadtring 81			13	1974	Residential
23	Seven Stones - Community Campus			12	2022	Residential

== Proposed ==
Name	Height (m)	Height (ft)	Floors	Year
City Tower	60 (originally 105 m planned)	197	21	Unknown

== See also ==
- List of tallest buildings in Germany
- List of tallest structures in Germany
