= Grand Tower (Frankfurt am Main) =

High-rise in the Europaviertel quarter in Frankfurt, Germany

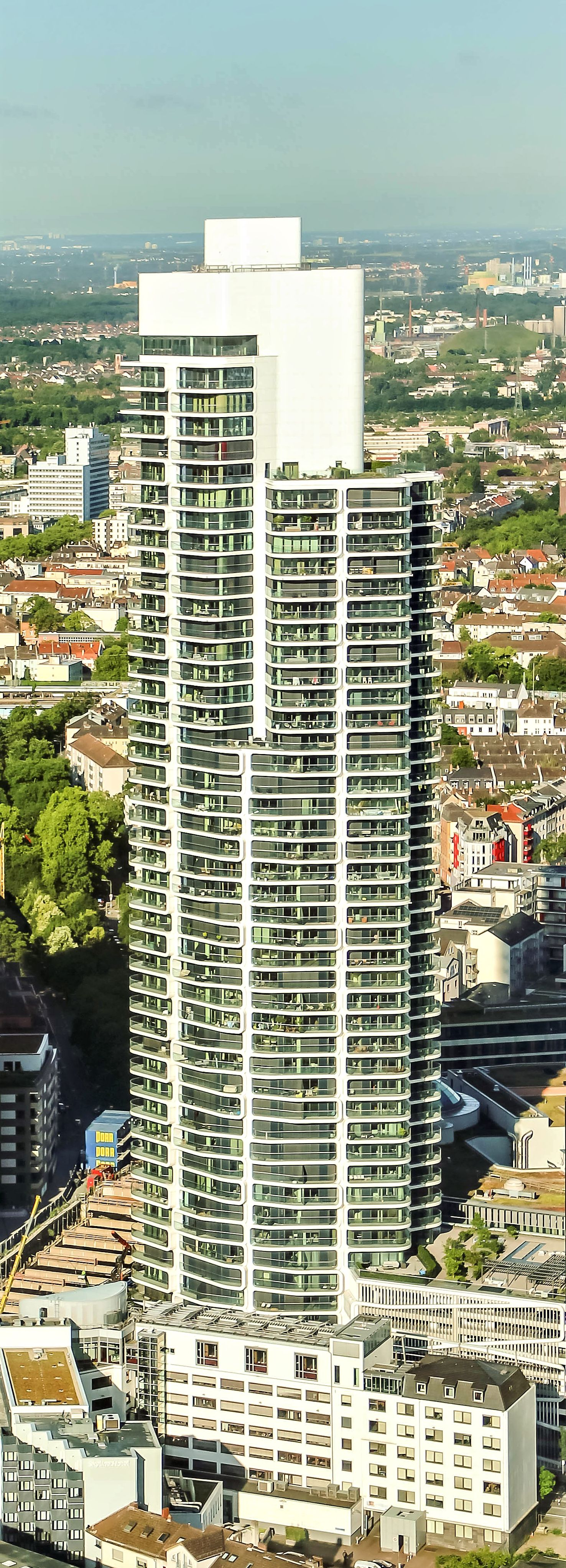
- Grand Tower in 2023
- Interactive map of the Grand Tower area

General information
- Status: Completed
- Type: Residential
- Location: Frankfurt-Gallus
- Coordinates: 50°6′30.3″N 8°39′16.3″E
- Construction started: February 2016
- Completed: 10 June 2020
- Owner: Gesellschaft für Städtebau und Projektentwicklung

Height
- Architectural: 179.9 m (590 ft)
- Roof: 187 m (614 ft)

Technical details
- Floor count: 51
- Floor area: 44,000 m^{2} (470,000 sq ft)

Design and construction
- Architects: Architekturbüro Magnus Kaminiarz & Cie

Other information
- Number of units: 401

Website
- www.grandtower-frankfurt.com

References
- CTBUH

The Grand Tower (formerly Tower 2) is a high-rise in the Europaviertel quarter in Frankfurt, Germany. The tower, completed in 2020 is Germany's tallest residential building at a height of 180 m (590 ft), exceeding the 147 m (482 ft) Colonia-Haus in Cologne built in 1973. The tower is located next to the Skyline-Plaza shopping center. The developer states the total investment at around 250 million euros.

The Grand Tower is considered to be the first high-rise residential building in Germany to be marketed globally; with the Asian, Arab and North American markets being the main focus.

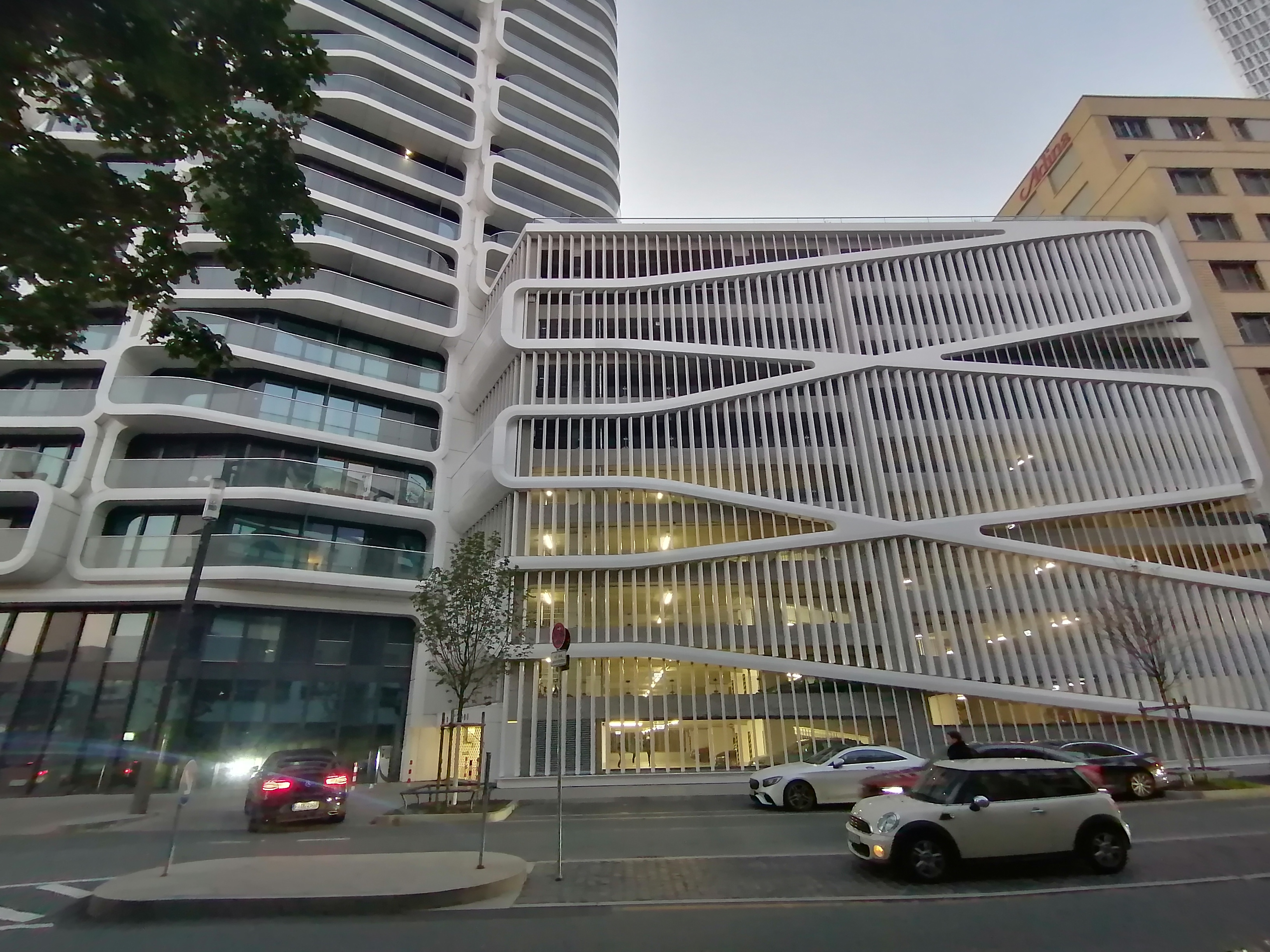
Entrance
