= Bayer-Hochhaus =

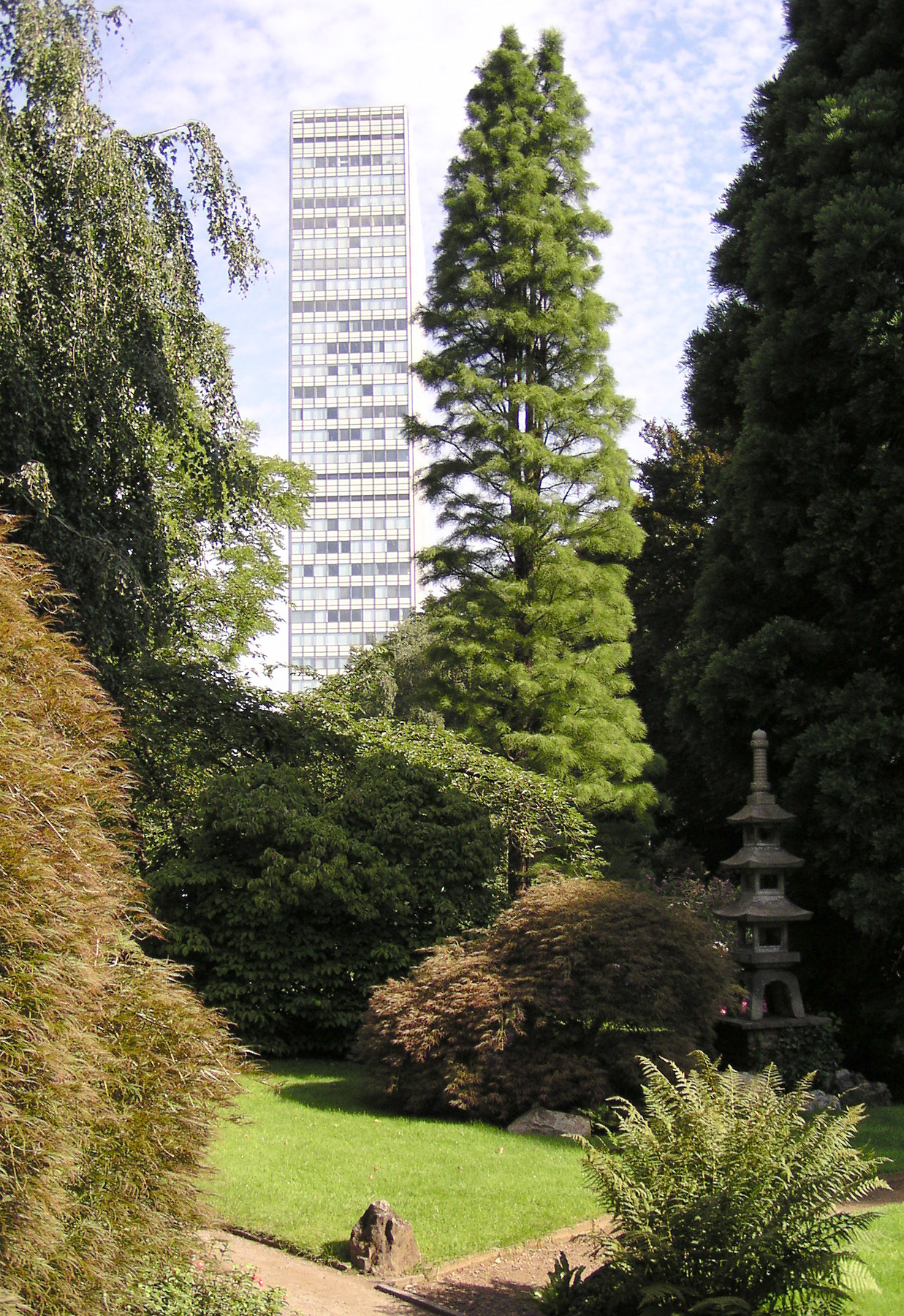

General information
- Status: Demolished
- Type: Commercial offices
- Architectural style: International style
- Location: Kaiser-Wilhelm-Allee; Leverkusen, Germany
- Coordinates: 51.0136°N 6.9816°E
- Completed: 1960–1963
- Demolished: 2012
- Owner: Bayer AG

Height
- Roof: 122 m (400 ft)

Technical details
- Floor count: 32
- Floor area: 26,000 m^{2} (280,000 sq ft)

Design and construction
- Architect: Hentrich, Petschnigg & Partner
- Engineer: Rheinstahl Wanheim GmbH

Bayer-Hochhaus was a 32-storey, 122 m (400 ft) skyscraper in Leverkusen, Germany. When completed in 1963, it was the tallest building in Germany for nine years until 1972 when City-Hochhaus Leipzig was built. It was demolished in 2012.

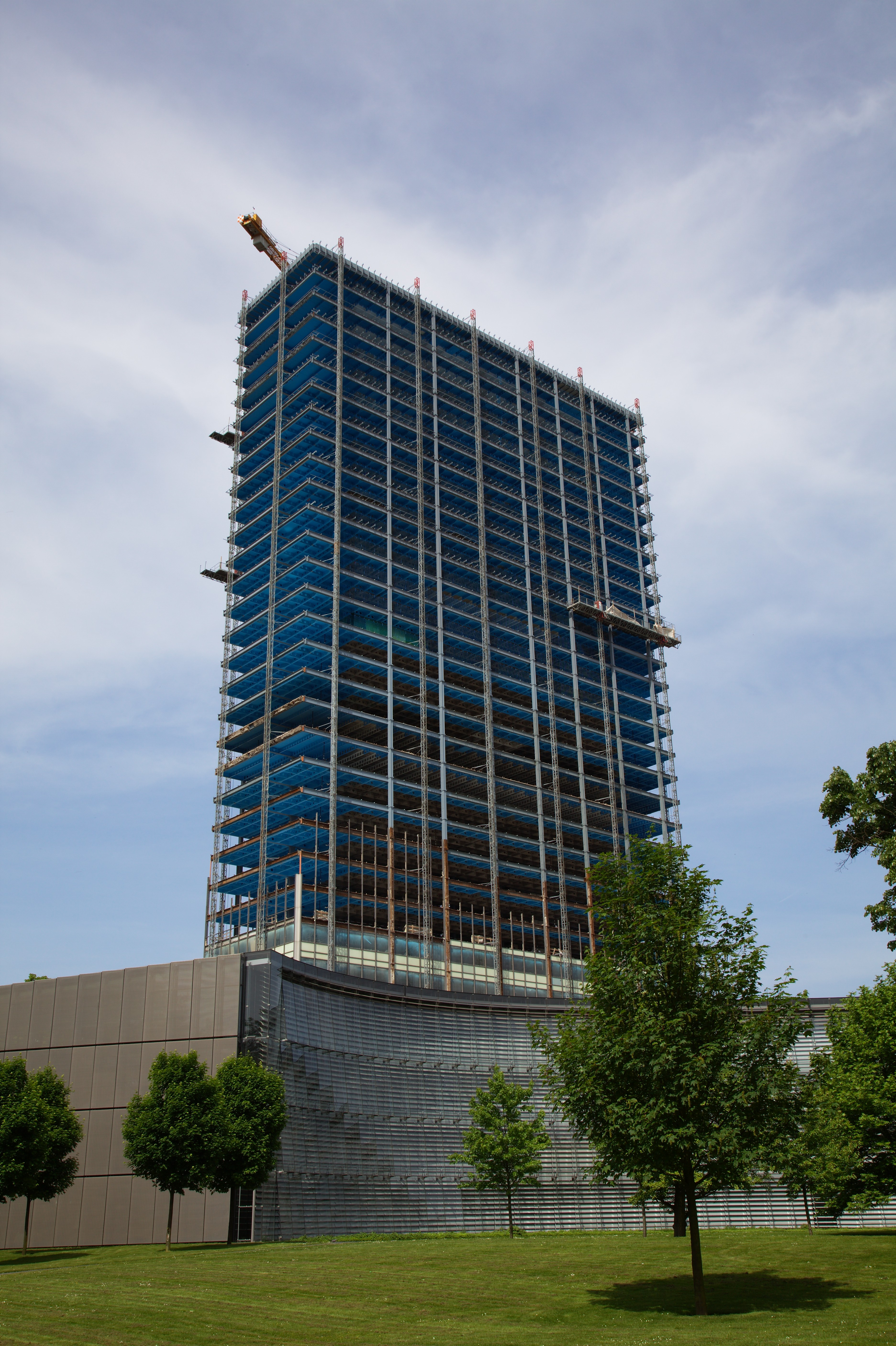

== See also ==
- List of tallest voluntarily demolished buildings
