= St. Peter's Church, Dortmund =

Church in Dortmund, Germany

Coordinates: 51°30′53″N 7°27′37″E

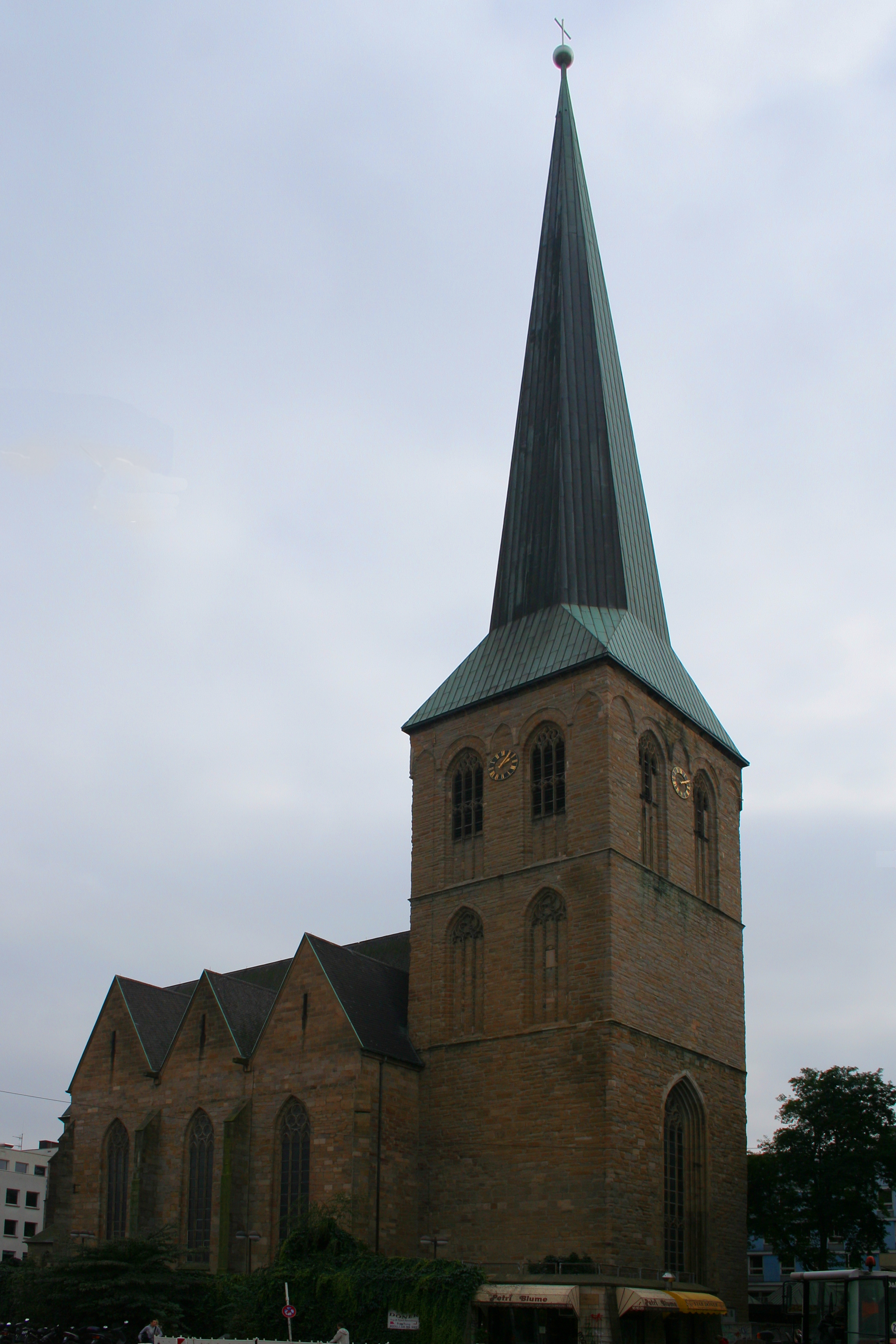

St. Peter's Church in Dortmund, Westphalia, Germany, is an urban hall church in the High Gothic style. The central nave and side aisles are of the same height, coming close to the ideal type of this church form. The building is almost square in plan with a comparatively short chancel. The sacred building is an important example of the special shape of the hall churches in Westphalia.

== History ==
St. Peter's Church is, alongside the Protestant St. Reinold's Church and the Protestant Marienkirche, another medieval church directly on Westenhellweg in downtown Dortmund. The three-bay building was begun in 1322 and is made of light sandstone. In its current form, the church again shows the original, medieval form of transverse gable roofs over the side aisles, which presents the viewer with a series of small pointed gables.

What is striking is the overly high-looking spire, which was not seen in this form for a long time after it collapsed in 1752 and was only restored to its historic height on November 17, 1981, after the destruction of the Second World War. In these dimensions it is the product of an old competition for the highest church tower in the city between the St. Reinold's Church and the St. Peter's one in the 15th and 16th centuries. The spire today has a total height of about 60 meters. It consists of a 15 meter high substructure and a 48 meter high spire with a globe and cross. The total height of the Petrikirche is 105 meters after the tower has been restored.

== Amenities ==
Inside St. Petri is the Golden Wonder of Westphalia, a magnificent carved altar. It is a late Gothic winged altar ( Antwerp retable ) from 1521. When closed, the altar shows the adoration of the Eucharist. When first opened, 36 detailed images can be seen. The holiday page, when opened, shows 30 compartments with gilded carved figures. A non-profit association called “The Golden Miracle in St. Petri eV” for the preservation of this cultural asset collects donations for repair and restoration.

Although the small post-war organ (17 registers on 2 manuals and pedal) from Walcker was never able to fill the space of the St. Peter's Church musically, the contract for a new organ was only signed at the end of 2013. Orgelbau Schulte was commissioned to convert the romantic organ, built in 1868 by the English company Radcliff & Sagar for the church of St. Mary, Woodkirk, near Leeds, for the Dortmund church, which had been relocated due to the church's closure. Since the entire technology, the wind turbine, the wind chests, the housing and the console were manufactured in the Kürten workshop, the instrument now looks more like a new building, which was ceremoniously inaugurated on September 6, 2015. The simple, 7.5 meter high cube with a cross-section of 3 × 2 meters accommodates 1,049 pipes and is polarizing. However, the cover made of gray glazed birch wood boards allows insights into the organ's technology. The free-standing, mobile console is connected to the organ via a LAN cable. After the organist, the controls are controlled by a Sinua Castellan system. Disposition of the Radcliff&Sager 1868 / Schulte 2015 organ.

The historic chime consisted of four bronze bells (c′ 1710, es′ 1639, e′ 1497, tot 1639). These did not have to be delivered during World War II, but were destroyed when the church was destroyed in 1945. Today's peal consists of five cast steel bells.

On July 1, 2007, the formerly independent St. Petri parish merged with the parishes of Nicolai and Martin to form the Evangelical parish of St. Petri-Nicolai. The background to the merger is the declining number of parishioners and the associated declining financial resources. The new evangelical congregation will have around 9,000 members.

The church with its historic fountain is listed as a monument in the city of Dortmund's list of monuments.
