= Maritim Travemünde =

Skyscraper in Lübeck, Germany

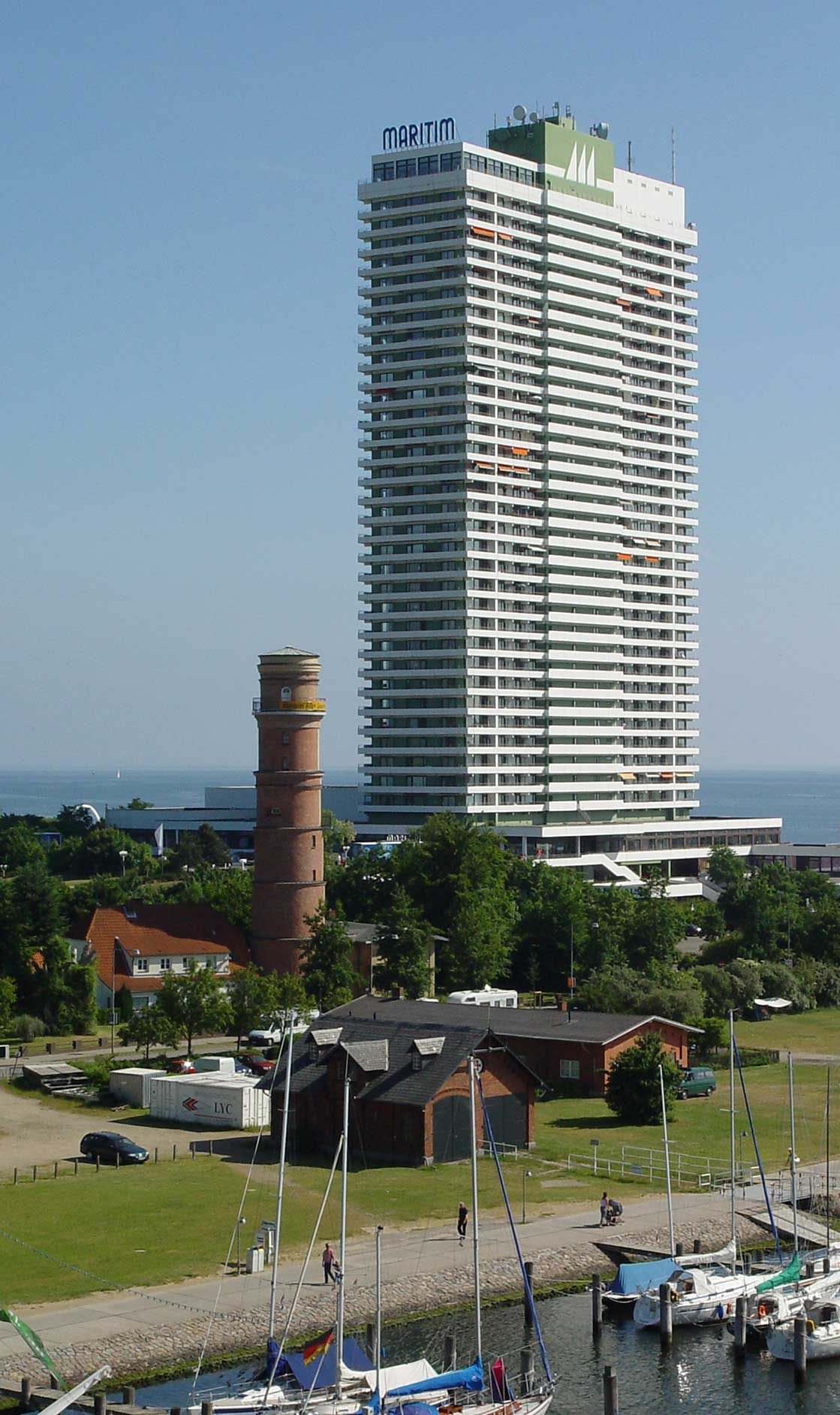
- Interactive map of the Maritim Travemünde area

General information
- Status: Completed
- Type: Hotel
- Location: Travemünde, Lübeck, Germany, 2 Trelleborgallee, Lübeck, Germany
- Coordinates: 53.96155°N 10.88095°E
- Construction started: 1972
- Completed: 1974
- Owner: Maritim Hotelgesellschaft

Height
- Roof: 119 m (390 ft)

Technical details
- Structural system: Concrete
- Floor count: 36 (+3 underground)

Design and construction
- Structural engineer: Hochtief

The Maritim Travemünde is a high-rise hotel in the Travemünde district of Lübeck, Germany. Built between 1972 and 1974, the tower stands at 119 m (390 ft) with 36 floors and is the current 48th tallest building in Germany.

== History ==
=== Architecture ===
The project is located in the district of Travemünde serving as a building complex with the larger of two high-rise buildings in the spa town being the tower itself. It was built by the German construction company Hochtief in the early 1970s and completed in 1974, with a height of 119 meters (125 m with the radio masts installed on the roof), with 36 floors and came as a revitalized concept for the tourist area at the time. In 2019 it was listed as a historical monument. The second high-rise building is on the corner of Nordlandring and Schwedenstraße.

In addition to the four-star hotel (floors 4 to 13), the Maritim Strandhotel also houses around 320 apartments (floors 14 to 34), commercial premises (shops), restaurants, an underground car park and an indoor pool. The highest restaurant (temporarily closed since 2019 → elevator broken) is on the 35th floor and offers a wide view over the Priwall with the four-masted barque Passat, Nordwestmecklenburg, the Trave with the Skandinavienkai as far as Lübeck and far over the Bay of Lübeck of the Baltic Sea with the coast of Ostholstein.

The large area of the outbuildings, including the swimming pool, which formed the part of the basement to the southeast of the high-rise, was demolished in the early 2010s and replaced by a green area, which initially became the property of the city of Lübeck. In the summer of 2018, a new hotel was built on this site, along with an apartment building and a public spa area.

=== The Lighthouse ===
The highest lighthouse in Europe, at 117 m, is located in the attic of the building. It replaces the lighthouse on the oldest lighthouse building in Germany, the old Travemünde lighthouse. The range of the white-red flashing light with a recurrence every four seconds is 15 (red) or 19 (white) nautical miles in the northeast sector, i.e. up to the height of the next lighthouse, Dahmeshöved, on the coast of Wagria behind Grömitz.

In 2019, the Hanseatic City of Lübeck listed the high-rise as a historical monument. This was justified by its special urban development value as a striking high-rise. The 1970s-style interior also played a role in the decision. The building is also a real and symbolic beacon of the free West.

== Gallery ==
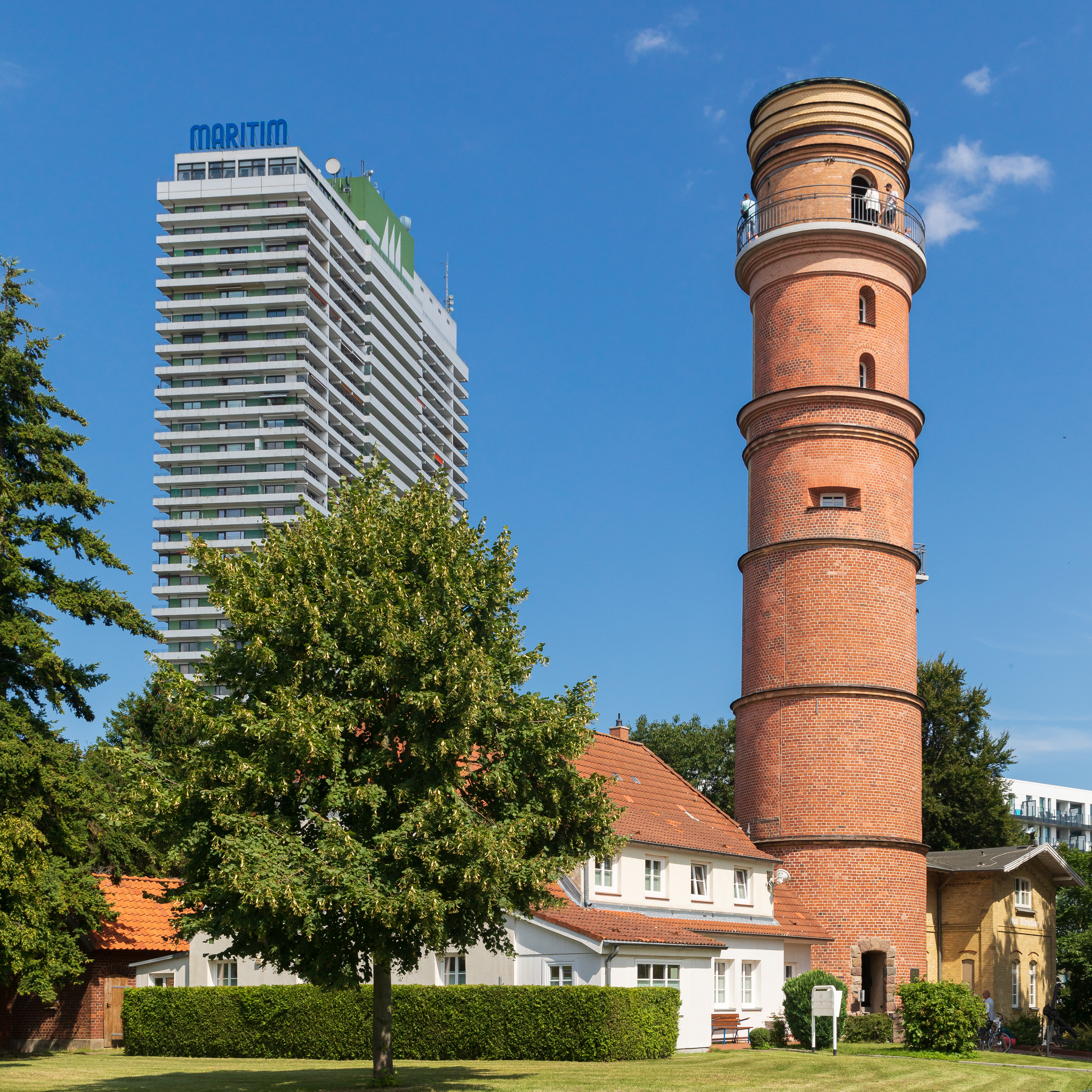
The old Travemünde lighthouse in front of the Maritim Hotel high-rise, on which the light is now mounted

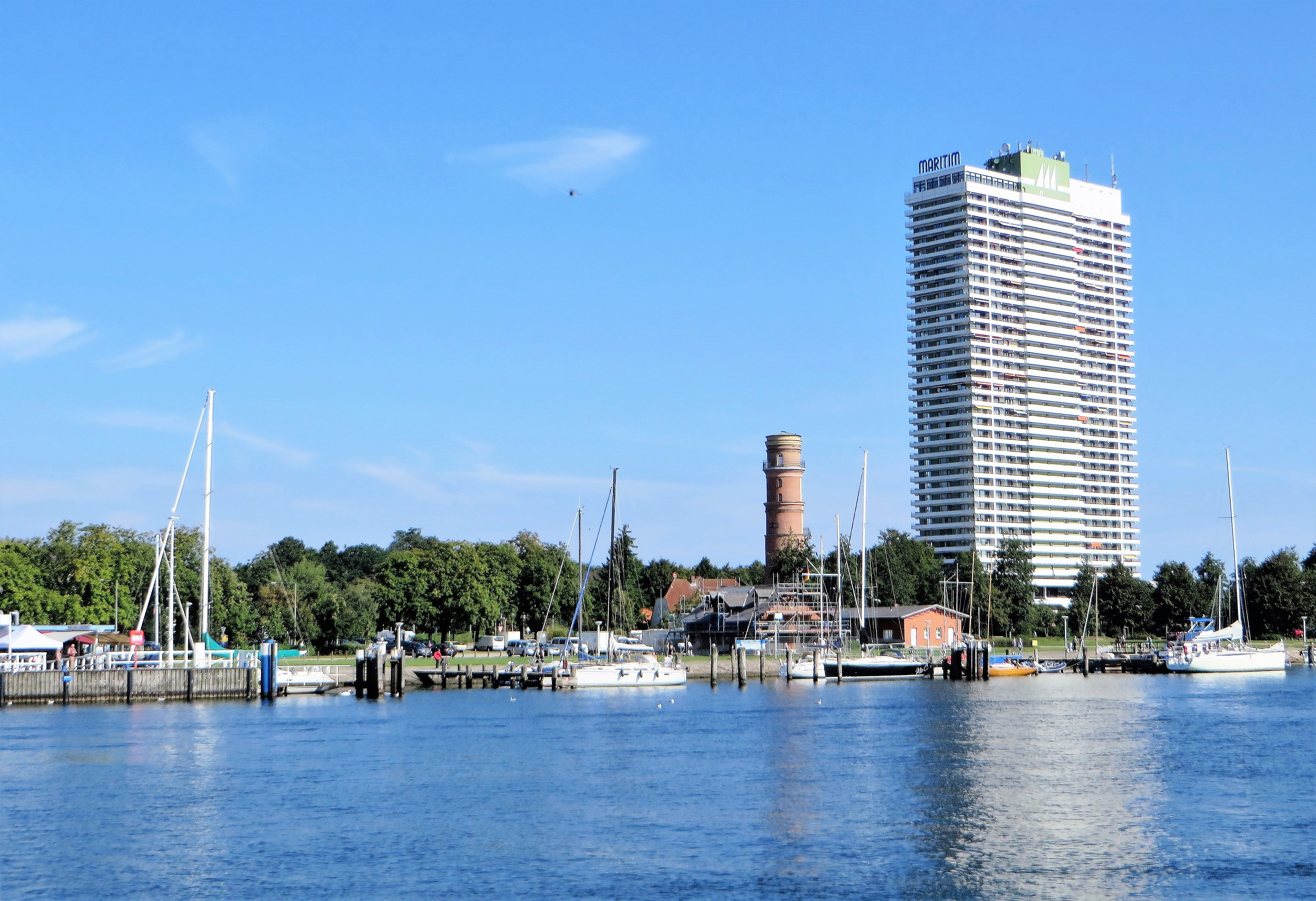
View from the Trave estuary area of the historic lighthouse and the Maritim Hotel on the promenade of Lübeck-Travemünde

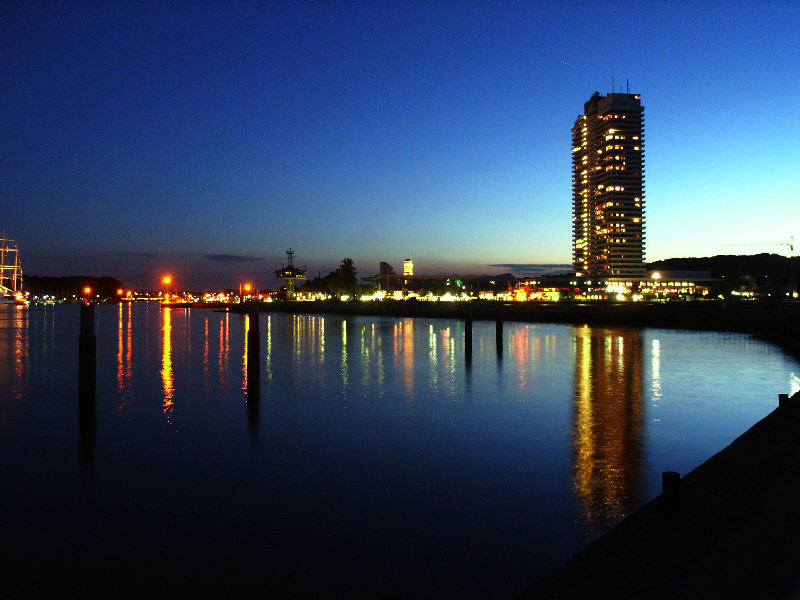
Skyline of Lübeck-Travemünde with the oldest lighthouse on the German Baltic coast and Maritim Hotel on the Travemünde promenade

== See also ==
- List of tallest buildings in Germany
