= Tower 185 =

Skyscraper in Frankfurt, Germany

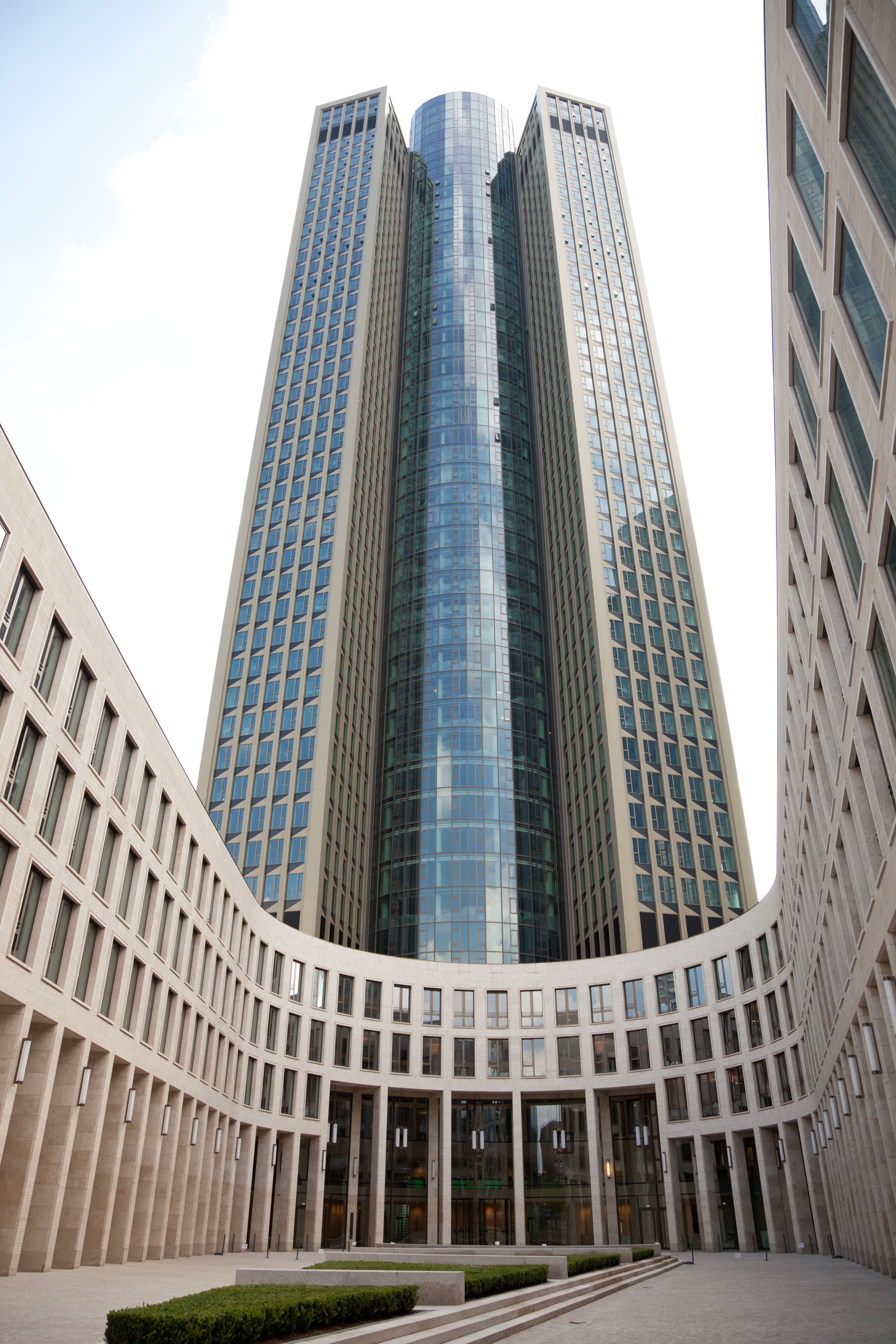
- Interactive map of the Tower 185 area

General information
- Type: Commercial offices
- Location: Friedrich-Ebert-Anlage 35-37; Frankfurt, Hesse, Germany
- Coordinates: 50.1106°N 8.65629°E
- Construction started: August 2008
- Opening: December 2011

Height
- Roof: 200 m (656 ft)

Technical details
- Floor count: 55; 2 below ground
- Floor area: 100,500 m^{2} (1,081,800 sq ft)
- Lifts/elevators: 10

Design and construction
- Architect: Christoph Mäckler

Tower 185 is a 55-storey, 200 m (660 ft) skyscraper in the Gallus district of Frankfurt, Germany. As of 2023, it is the fourth-tallest building in Frankfurt and the fourth-tallest in Germany, tied with Main Tower. The anchor tenant of the tower is the German branch office of PricewaterhouseCoopers, which has leased 60,000 m^{2} (650,000 sq ft).

The tower was initially planned to be 185 m (607 ft) with 50 storeys; however, in the final plan by Christoph Mäckler, the height was increased to 200 m (660 ft). Nevertheless, its name was not changed, hence "Tower 185".

When Germany submitted its application to have Frankfurt selected as the seat of the European Union's Anti-money-laundering authority (AMLA) in 2023, Tower 185 was one of three options – alongside Messeturm – presented as potential location for the new agency.

== See also ==
- List of tallest buildings in Frankfurt
- List of tallest buildings in Germany
- List of tallest buildings in Europe
