= Büro Center =

Büro Center may refer to:

- Büro Center Nibelungenplatz (BCN) formerly Shell Tower, now known as City Gate Frankfurt, Germany
- Frankfurter Büro Center (FBC), a skyscraper in the Westend-Süd district of Frankfurt, Germany
- Plaza Büro Center now known as Westend Gate
