= Westhafen Tower =

Skyscraper in Frankfurt, Germany

- Westhafen Tower in 2019
- Interactive map of the Westhafen Tower area

General information
- Status: Completed
- Type: Commercial Offices
- Location: Westhafenplatz 1 Frankfurt; Hesse, Germany
- Coordinates: 50°06′04″N 8°39′51″E
- Construction started: 2001
- Completed: 2004
- Cost: US$77 million
- Owner: Westhafen Tower GmbH & Co. OFB Projektentwicklung GmbH

Height
- Roof: 112.3 m (368 ft)

Technical details
- Floor count: 30; 5 below ground
- Floor area: 42,800 m^{2} (461,000 sq ft)
- Lifts/elevators: 10

Design and construction
- Architect: Schneider + Schumacher Architekten BDA
- Structural engineer: Schüßler-Plan Ingenieurgesellschaft mbH
- Main contractor: Philipp Holzmann AG

Westhafen Tower is a 112.3 m (368 ft) 30-storey skyscraper in the Gutleutviertel district of Frankfurt, Germany. The building was designed by the architects Schneider & Schumacher and was completed in 2004. The tower, whose name literally means "West Port Tower", is one of the first buildings at the former West Port.

== Construction ==
From the outside, the building is shaped like a cylinder, but the storeys are square-shaped, creating 18 conservatories between the interior and exterior. Each of the 30 floors above ground has a rentable area of approximately 820 square metres. One of the architectural features is the rhomboid facade structure, with 3556 triangular panes of glass forming the outer skin.

The structure of the building's glass facade resembles the ribbed surface of a typical Frankfurtian cider glass. Therefore, the building is popularly called Das Gerippte, literally meaning "the Ribbed". (see Geripptes)

A portion of the triangular segments of the glass can be automatically opened for ventilation purposes in the bottom corner. The floors are heated with under the windows recessed convectors as the cooling is done via a cooling ceiling.

== Tenants ==
Westhafen Tower houses the headquarters of the European Insurance and Occupational Pensions Authority.

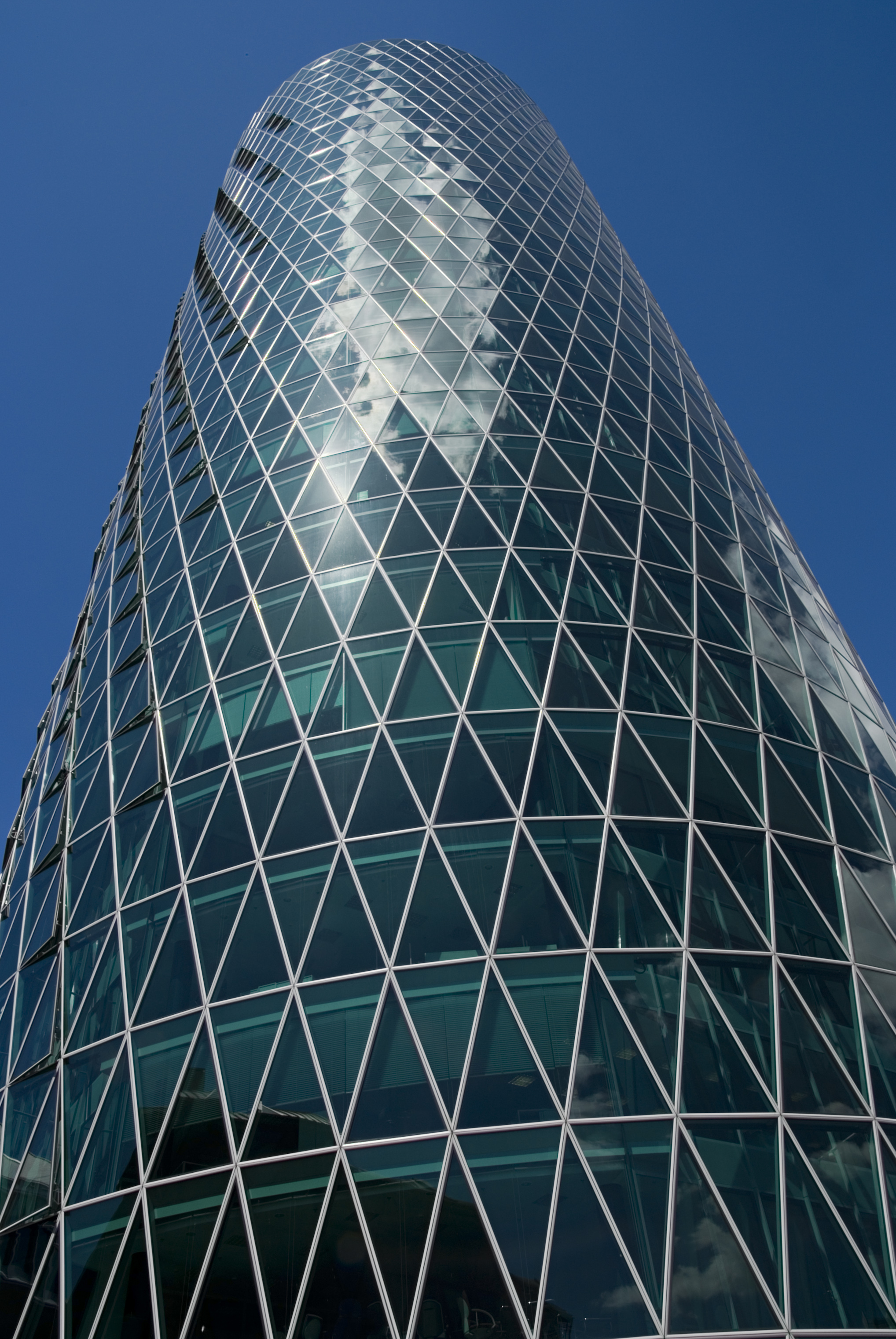
The Westhafen Tower's glass facade

== See also ==
- List of tallest buildings in Frankfurt
- List of tallest buildings in Germany
