= One Forty West =

Skyscraper in Frankfurt, Germany

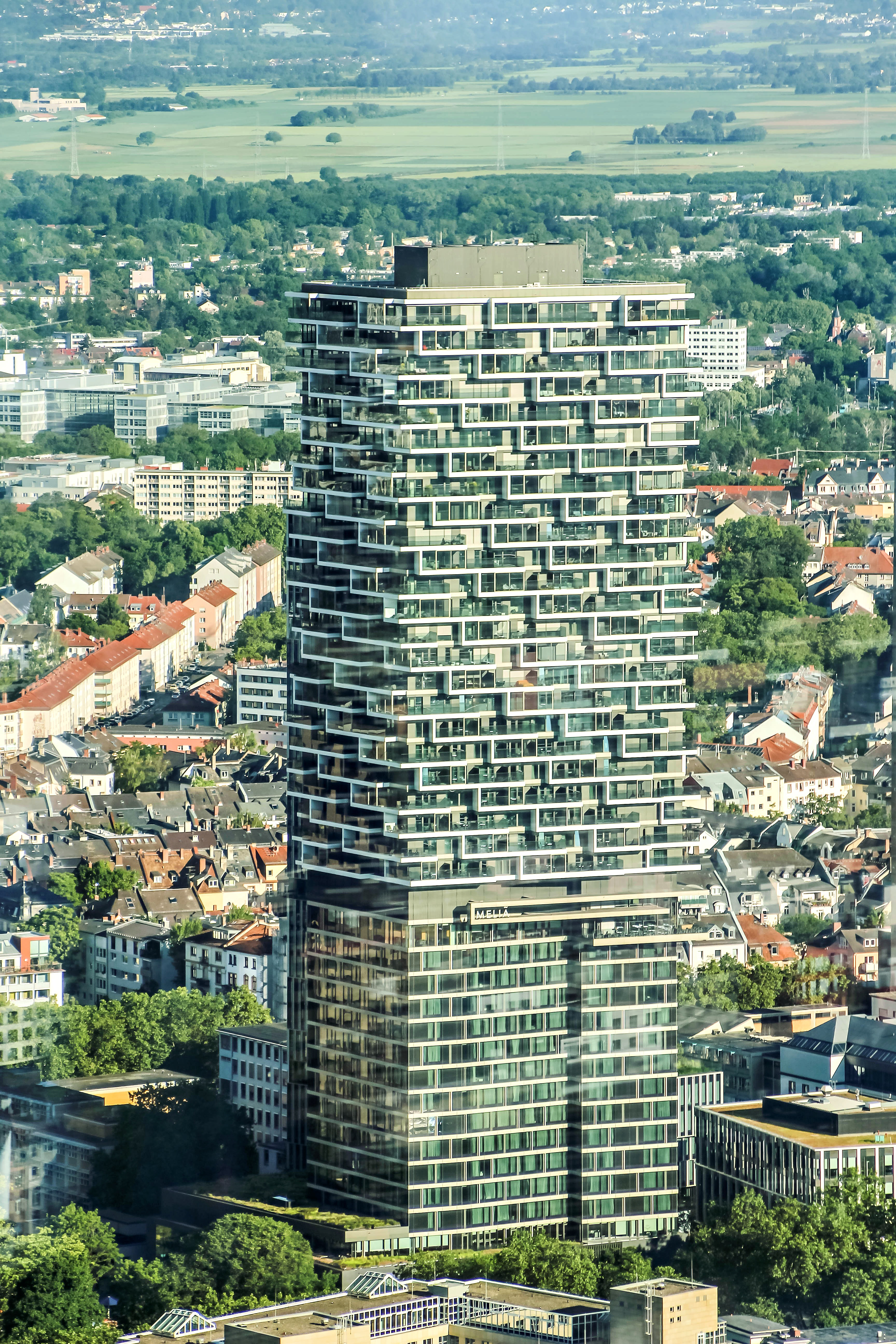
- Interactive map of the One Forty West area

General information
- Status: Completed
- Type: Mixed-use: Residential / Hotel
- Location: Frankfurt, Germany, 15 Senckenberganlage, 60325 Frankfurt am Main, Germany
- Coordinates: 50.11597°N 8.65150°E
- Construction started: 2017
- Completed: 2020
- Owner: Commerz Real Hausinvest

Height
- Roof: 145 m (476 ft)

Technical details
- Structural system: Concrete
- Floor count: 41 (+4 underground)
- Floor area: 52,000 m^{2} (560,000 sq ft)

Design and construction
- Architect: Moser Assoziierte Architekten
- Structural engineer: Werner Sobek Group
- Main contractor: Drees & Sommer Advanced Building

Website
- ONE

One Forty West is a mixed-use high-rise building in the Westend-Süd district of Frankfurt, Germany. Built between 2017 and 2020, the tower stands at 145 m (476 ft) tall and is the current 22nd tallest building in Frankfurt. It is also part of the Kulturcampus Complex alongside the Senckenberg Turm.

== History ==
=== Planning ===
The 145-meter-high tower houses a total of 187 rental and condominium apartments from the 24th floor onwards, as well as a hotel below in the immediate vicinity of the Frankfurt Trade Fair. The 4-star hotel with 430 rooms located within the tower opened in June 2021.

The high-rise project is described as a hybrid tower, combining two distinctive functions of housing apartments in addition to a hotel. Because of the expected high rental prices, critics considered it to be another "luxury residential island".

Between 1970 until its demolition on February 2, 2014, the 116-meter-high AfE-Turm owned by the Johann Wolfgang Goethe University was located on the property. This was part of the Bockenheim campus of the Goethe University and housed the offices and seminar rooms of the departments of social sciences, educational sciences and psychology until March 2013. On August 23, 2011, the state of Hesse sold the Bockenheim campus to the city-owned ABG Frankfurt Holding, as the Goethe University had decided to close the Bockenheim site and relocate the departments to the Westend campus and the Riedberg campus.

=== Architecture ===
According to the high-rise framework plan, the construction of two high-rises, originally 140 and 100 metres high, is permitted on the site of the former AfE tower. In September 2015, Commerz Real acquired part of the site for what would later become One Forty West in a joint venture with the project developer Groß & Partner. Commerz Real was involved in this for its open real estate fund hausInvest. DJH Architekten initially prepared urban planning studies and later planned the high-rise. Groß & Partner took over the planning and management of further development. After completion, the project developer sold its shares in the One Forty West project company.

A long-term 25-year lease was signed for the first 16 floors with Meliá Hotels International, which has since opened a four-star hotel here. An architectural competition was held in January 2016, but there was no clear winner, as only three equal second prizes were awarded. The three architectural firms were then commissioned to revise their designs. In March 2016, the revised design by Cyrus Moser Architects was chosen as the winner. Construction of the hotel and residential high-rise began at the end of 2016.

On the upper floors (24th to 40th) of the hybrid high-rise, 94 condominiums and 93 rental apartments will be built. The condominiums - for which the upper floors from the 32nd to the 40th floor are reserved - are offered in three apartment types and various sizes from 50 to 137 square meters at prices starting at 735,000 euros. The square meter prices start (as of spring 2020) at 13,000 euros, while the rental apartments are priced at 35 euros per square meter. All apartments have balconies, each with a view of the Frankfurt skyline or the Taunus. There will be a 24-hour concierge service in the lobby - and a refrigerated wine cellar will be installed in the basement.

The site for the neighboring second high-rise building (initially called the North Office Building) was still owned by ABG Frankfurt Holding in 2016. The Senckenberg Tower was built there and was completed in early 2022 after two and a half years of construction. It reaches a height of 106 meters.

== See also ==
- List of tallest buildings in Frankfurt
- List of tallest buildings in Germany
- List of tallest buildings in Europe
