= Senckenberg Turm =

Skyscraper in Frankfurt, Germany

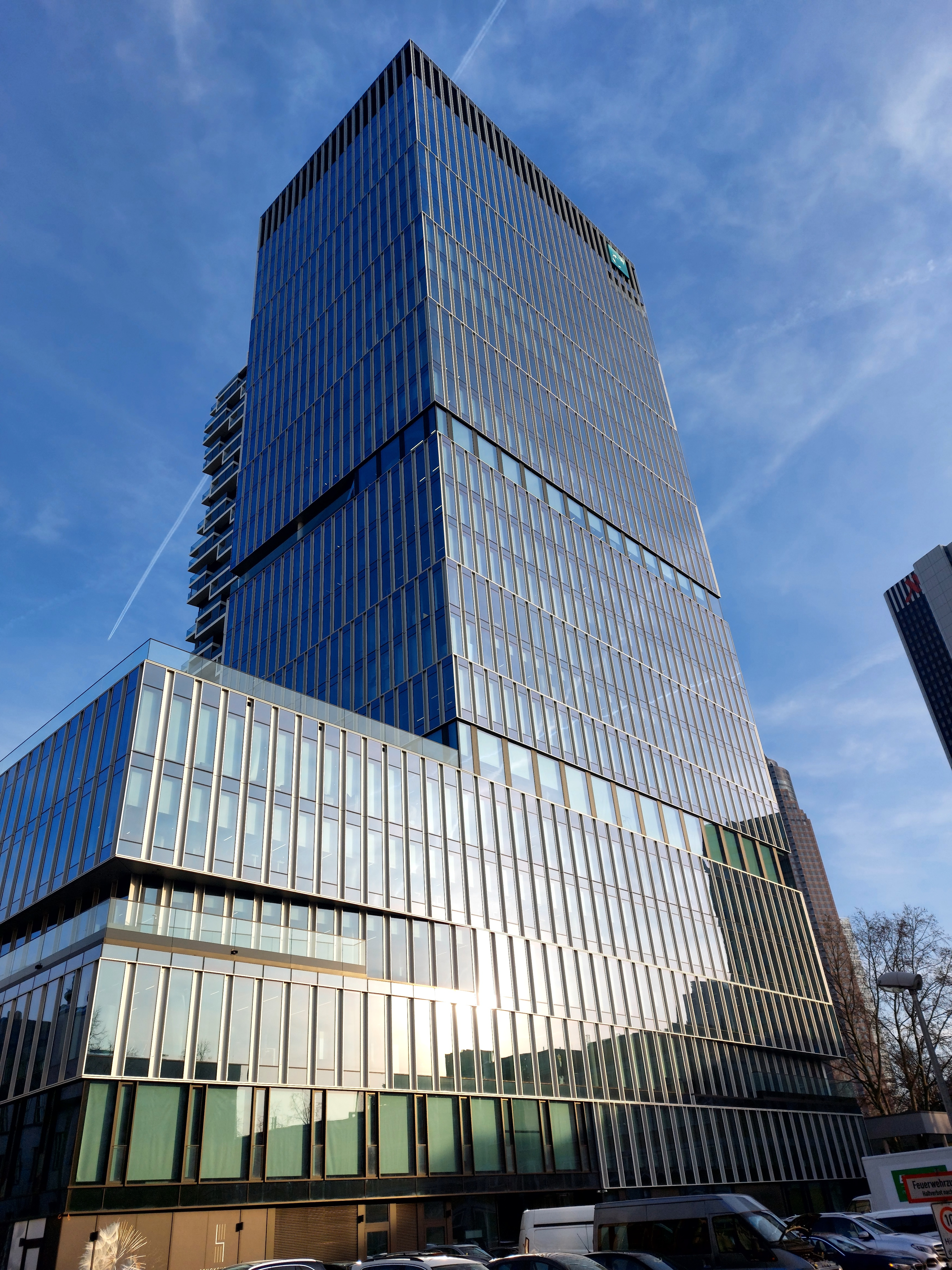
- Interactive map of the Senckenberg Turm area

General information
- Status: Completed
- Type: Office
- Location: Frankfurt, Germany, 5 Robert-Mayer-Straße, Frankfurt-Innenstadt II, Germany
- Coordinates: 50.11660°N 8.65054°E
- Construction started: 2019
- Completed: 2022
- Owner: NAS Invest

Height
- Roof: 106 m (348 ft)

Technical details
- Structural system: Reinforced concrete
- Floor count: 26
- Floor area: 27,000 m^{2} (291,000 sq ft)

Design and construction
- Architect: cyrus moser architekten
- Structural engineer: Doka GmbH (Formwork)
- Main contractor: Drees & Sommer Advanced Building

Website
- Senckenberg Turm

The Senckenberg Turm also known as the T-Rex Hybrid High-rise or the 99 West Frankfurt is a high-rise office building in the Westend-Süd district of Frankfurt, Germany. Built between 2019 and 2022, the tower stands at 106 m (348 ft) with 26 floors and is the current 41st tallest building in Frankfurt. It is also part of the Kulturcampus Complex alongside the One Forty West tower.

== History ==
=== Architecture ===
In 2014, the city council passed the development plan no. 569 Senckenberganlage/Bockenheimer Warte. It allows the construction of two high-rise buildings of 100 and 140 meters in height on the site of the former AfE-Turm. Next to the mixed-use One Forty West, the Senckenberg Tower is the smaller of these two properties.

The architectural competition for the site was won in March 2016 by the design of the Frankfurt-based firm Cyrus Moser Architekten. The design of the 265 million euro high-rise (total investment volume) is characterized by vertically arranged window bands.

In the first quarter of 2017, the Frankfurt-based project developer Groß & Partner acquired part of the site of the future Senckenberg Tower from the municipal housing company ABG Frankfurt Holding. At that time, the project was called 99 West. In April 2018, it was announced that Groß & Partner had sold the project to BNP Paribas Real Estate (BNPPRE), the real estate arm of the French bank BNP Paribas, before construction began. BNPPRE thus appeared on the German market for the first time as a project developer.

In autumn 2018, BNP Paribas announced the relocation of its German headquarters, which was already located in Frankfurt, to the lowest 14 floors of the office building and implemented this after completion. A total of 27,000 square metres of rental space are available in the tower. At the end of 2019, it was announced that the investment company NAS Invest had recently acquired 99 West from BNP. In September 2020, the new name Senckenberg Tower was officially announced.

The tower is named after the Frankfurt physician and founder Johann Christian Senckenberg.

== See also ==
- List of tallest buildings in Frankfurt
- List of tallest buildings in Germany
