= Garden Tower =

High-rise building in the Innenstadt district of Frankfurt, Germany

Coordinates: 50.1117°N 8.6725°E

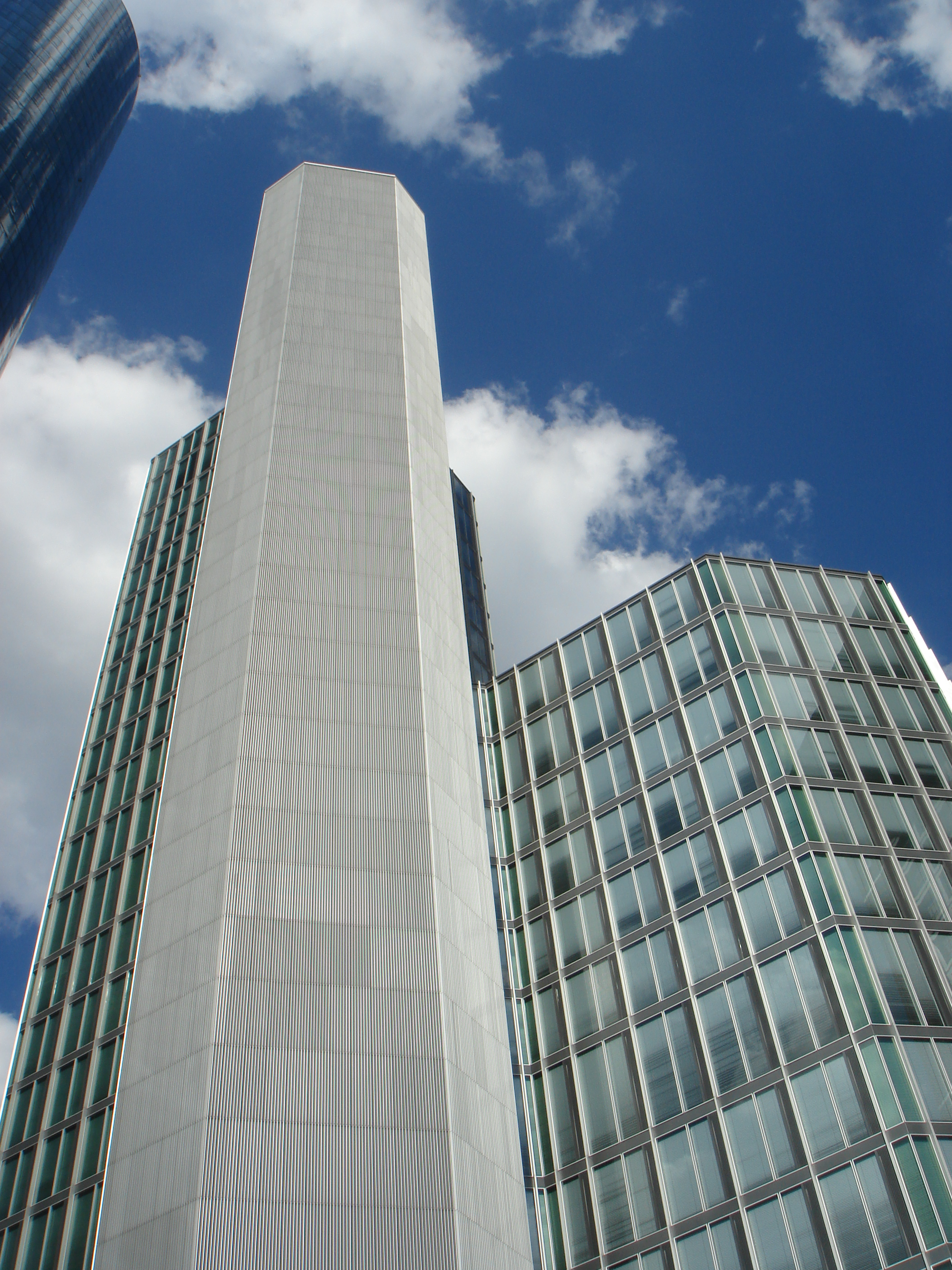
- Interactive map of the Garden Tower area

General information
- Type: Commercial offices
- Location: Neue Mainzer Straße 46-50; Frankfurt; Hesse, Germany
- Construction started: 1973
- Completed: 1976

Height
- Roof: 127 m (417 ft)

Technical details
- Floor count: 25

Design and construction
- Architect: Novotny Mähner Assoziierte

Garden Tower is a high-rise building in the Innenstadt district of Frankfurt, Germany. It was built between 1973 and 1976 as the headquarters of Landesbank Hessen-Thüringen (Helaba) and was one of the first high-rise buildings in Frankfurt's financial district, the Bankenviertel. The building, designed by architecture firm Novotny Mähner Assoziierte, was commonly referred to as Helaba-Hochhaus until Helaba moved to a new location, the 200-metres-high Main Tower, in 1999. The tower underwent a major renovation from 2003 to 2005 and was reopened under its current name.

The Garden Tower consists of two towers of which the highest reaches 127 metres. Tower A has 25 floors and Tower B has 14 floors. The towers were completely gutted, leaving only the steel and concrete skeleton. After the removal of asbestos, it was re-dressed, the polygonal shape of the structure remained unchanged. The structural feature of the Garden Tower are twelve conservatories, which were carved into the facade. Most of the office floors provide either direct access to their own garden or enjoy views of the two-storey conservatories.

Today several companies (including the Germany subsidiary of Société Générale, Cerberus Capital Management, Huxley Associates, The Bank of New York Mellon and Frankfurter Sparkasse 1822 Private Banking) are represented in the Garden Tower.

== See also ==
- List of tallest buildings in Frankfurt
- List of tallest buildings in Germany
