= The Spin (Frankfurt) =

Skyscraper in Frankfurt, Germany

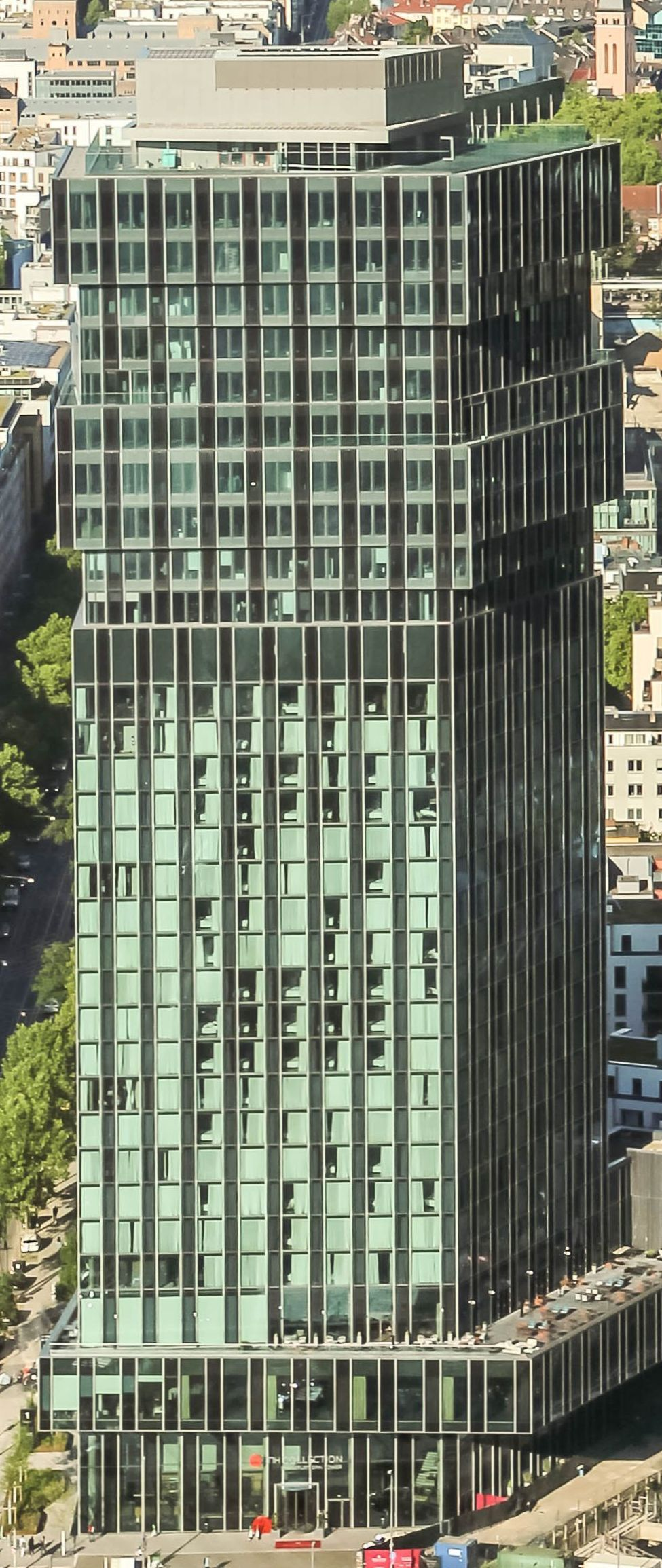
- The Spin under construction in March 2021

General information
- Status: Completed
- Type: Mixed-use: Office / Hotel
- Location: Frankfurt, Germany, 1 Güterplatz, Frankfurt am Main, Germany
- Coordinates: 50.10769°N 8.65510°E
- Construction started: 2018
- Completed: 2023
- Cost: € 200,000,000

Height
- Roof: 128 m (420 ft)

Technical details
- Structural system: Concrete
- Floor count: 31
- Floor area: 34,150 m^{2} (368,000 sq ft)

Design and construction
- Architect: Hadi Teherani
- Developer: Groß & Partner

The Spin (formerly known as Tower 120) is a mixed-use high-rise building in the Gallus district of Frankfurt, Germany. Built between 2018 and 2023, the tower stands at 128 m (420 ft) tall with 31 floors and is the current 29th tallest building in Frankfurt.

== History ==
A 160-meter-high office tower was to be built on the former Telenorma company site between the Mainzer Landstraße, Güterplatz and Europa-Allee, which had been lying fallow for 20 years, but the property owner Robert Bosch GmbH was unable to find an investor. In 2013, the owner announced that the high-rise would no longer be built and that a new development with apartments was planned instead.

In 2015, Robert Bosch GmbH sold the property to ABG Frankfurt Holding, which presented plans for the construction of a hotel tower up to 90 meters high and a residential tower about 60 meters high. Also in 2015, ABG sold the part of the later The Spin to the Frankfurt project developer Groß & Partner, who subsequently acted as the building owner. At the beginning of 2016, a realization and ideas competition was announced, which was won in March 2016 by the architectural firms Jahn and Magnus Kaminiarz & Cie. The design envisaged a 90-meter-high residential tower ("Eden") with around 130 condominiums and a block-edge development on Europa-Allee, as well as a 120-meter-high hotel high-rise ("Tower 120") on Güterplatz. In 2017, the name of "Spin Tower" was publicly presented, by which the building is still recognized as of today.

=== Architecture ===
The tower was built according to the plans created by Hamburg-based architect Hadi Teherani. While the lower 20 floors of the tower are rented by the NH Hotel Group, there are around 10,000 square meters of office space on floors 22 to 31 as well as a roof terrace on the 32nd floor for office employees. The groundbreaking ceremony for the three buildings on the site took place on May 29, 2018. Construction should be completed in 2020. Later, the developer Groß & Partner announced 2022 as the target completion date and estimated the total investment at around 200 million euros. Next to the building there should be a stop on the U5 subway line from 2022, it is now expected that the subway line to the Europaviertel will be completed in the course of 2027 (as of April 2024).

In November 2019, it was announced that Groß & Partner had sold the property to the following institutional investors: Medical Care Lower Saxony, Medical Care Saxony-Anhalt, Medical Care Mecklenburg-Vorpommern, Veterinary Care, Lower Saxony, Tax Advisors' Pension Fund Lower Saxony. The skyscraper was completed in April 2023, and on May 1, 2023, the NH Collection Frankfurt Spin Tower hotel opened on the lower 20 floors of the property.

=== Cricitism ===
Former head of the urban planning and architecture department of the Frankfurter Allgemeine Zeitung publishing Matthias Alexander described the design as "unsuccessful". He also criticizes the composition of the jury that selected the design: a few independent architects could not have rebelled against the personal preferences of the project developer Jürgen Groß and the representatives of the city and the building owner.

== See also ==
- List of tallest buildings in Frankfurt
- List of tallest buildings in Germany
