= IBC Tower =

Skyscraper in the IBC building complex in Bockenheim district of Frankfurt, Germany

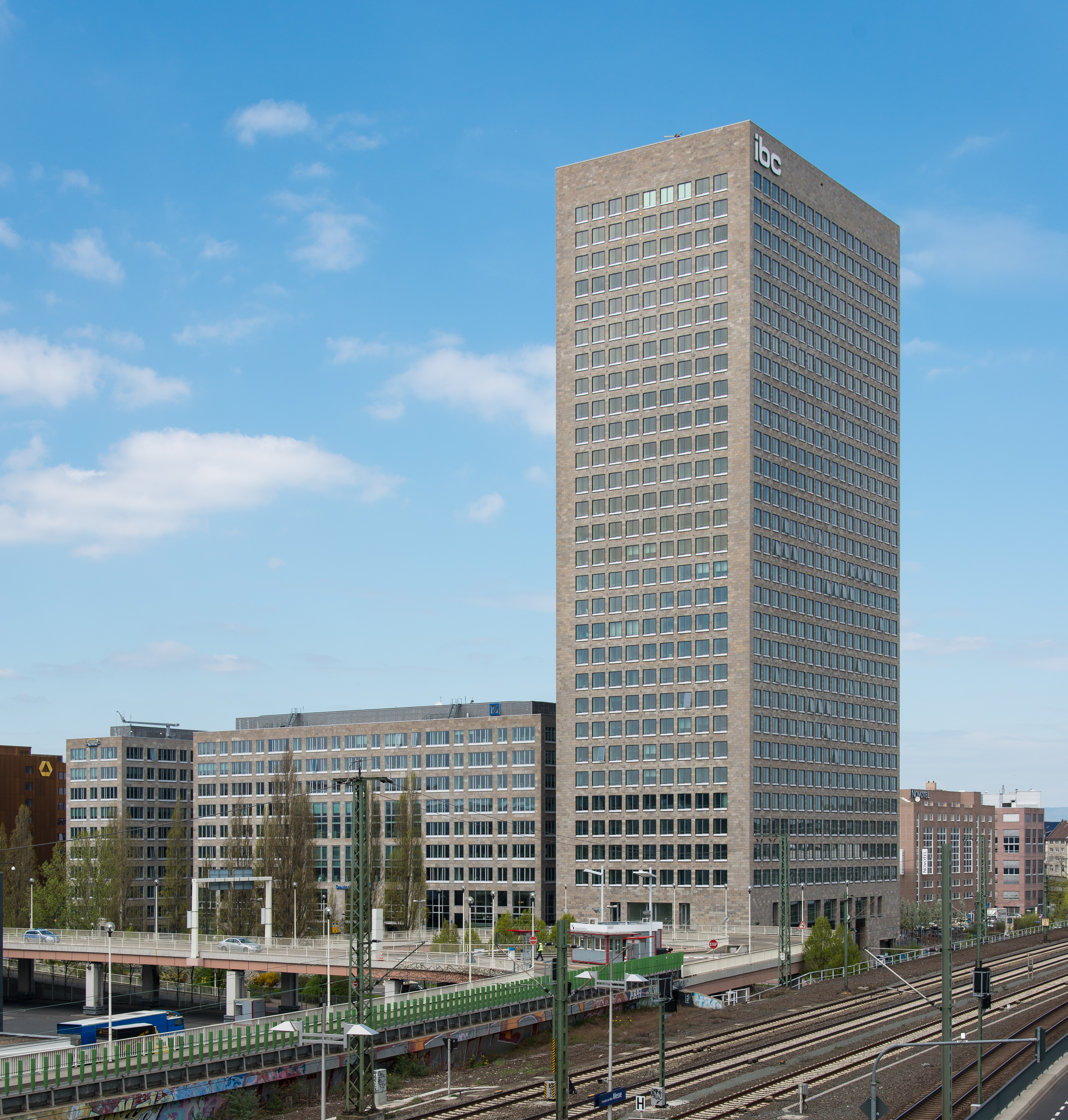
- Interactive map of the IBC Tower area
- Alternative names: Deutsche Bank Investment Banking Center; IBOC; Torhaus I IBC Tower C

General information
- Type: Commercial offices
- Architectural style: Modernism
- Location: Theodor-Heuss-Allee 70; Frankfurt; Hesse, Germany
- Coordinates: 50°06′52″N 8°38′33″E
- Construction started: 2001
- Completed: 2003

Height
- Roof: 112 m (367 ft)

Technical details
- Floor count: 30
- Floor area: 130,000 m^{2} (1,400,000 sq ft)
- Lifts/elevators: 22

Design and construction
- Architect: Kohler Architekten
- Engineer: BGS Ingenieursozietät
- Main contractor: Hochtief; Strabag Bau-AG

IBC Tower is a skyscraper in the IBC building complex in Bockenheim district of Frankfurt, Germany. At 30-storeys and 112 m (367 ft), it is considerably taller than the other two buildings named IBC Tower A, and IBC Tower B, which are both ten storeys.

The IBC was built by Deutsche Bank on a design by architect Kohler and was completed in 2003. It is situated at Theodor-Heuss-Allee close to the Frankfurt Trade Fair grounds.

Originally, Deutsche Bank planned as Investment Banking Center to concentrate such financial activity in the complex. This has never been implemented. Finally, Deutsche Bank sold the entire complex to the U.S. financial investor Blackstone Group and only rented Building B, in which the German Private and Business Bank AG and parts of the Deutsche Bank Human Resources division moved in. Building A was rented by the Degussa Bank GmbH, ING Real Estate Development and Construction and the INDUSTRIA rental company rented mbH.

In 2006, Deutsche Bank also temporarily rented Building C, the IBC Tower, because of a major renovation in their company headquarters, the Deutsche Bank Twin Towers. The renovation was completed in 2011.

== See also ==
- List of tallest buildings in Frankfurt
- List of tallest buildings in Germany
