= Central Business Tower =

Skyscraper in Frankfurt, Germany

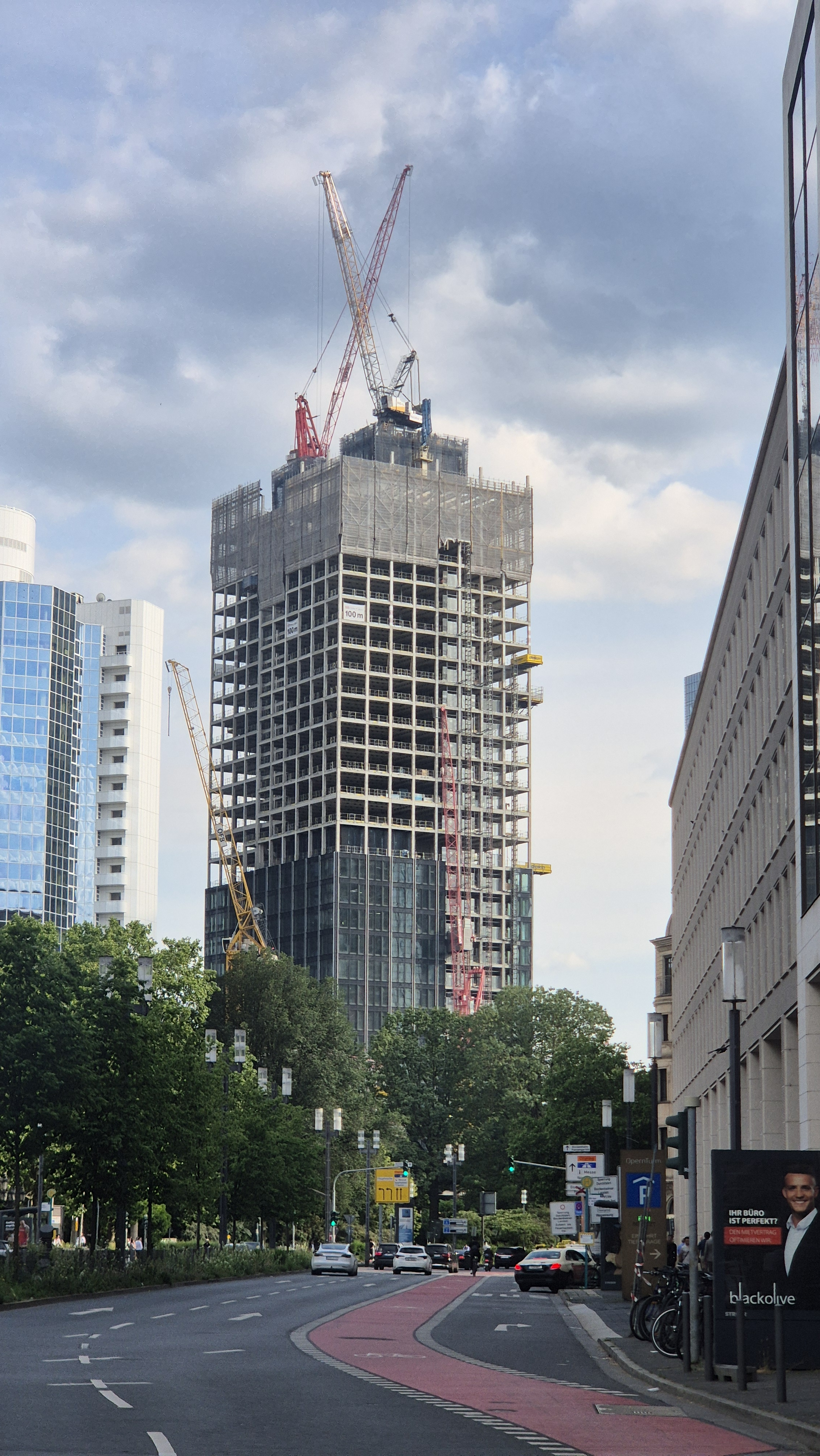
Central Business Tower under construction in June 2026

Central Business Tower is an under construction office skyscraper in Frankfurt, Germany. At a planned height of 205 metres (673 feet) and 52 storeys, the building will become the fifth-tallest building in Frankfurt upon its completion in 2027. Construction on the building began in 2024.

The high-rise was designed by architectural firm KSP Engel and features a twin-tower structure connected by a glass section. The building comprises a total of approximately 66,000 square meters of office space. It incorporates the heritage-listed building at the base—originally constructed between 1889 and 1892 by Ludwig Neher and Aage von Kauffmann—which is slated to house a branch of the Museum of World Cultures. The anchor tenant is Commerzbank, which has leased the entire office space within the tower.

== See also ==
- List of tallest buildings in Frankfurt
