= List of tallest buildings in Frankfurt =

Skyline of Frankfurt Skyline von Frankfurt am Main
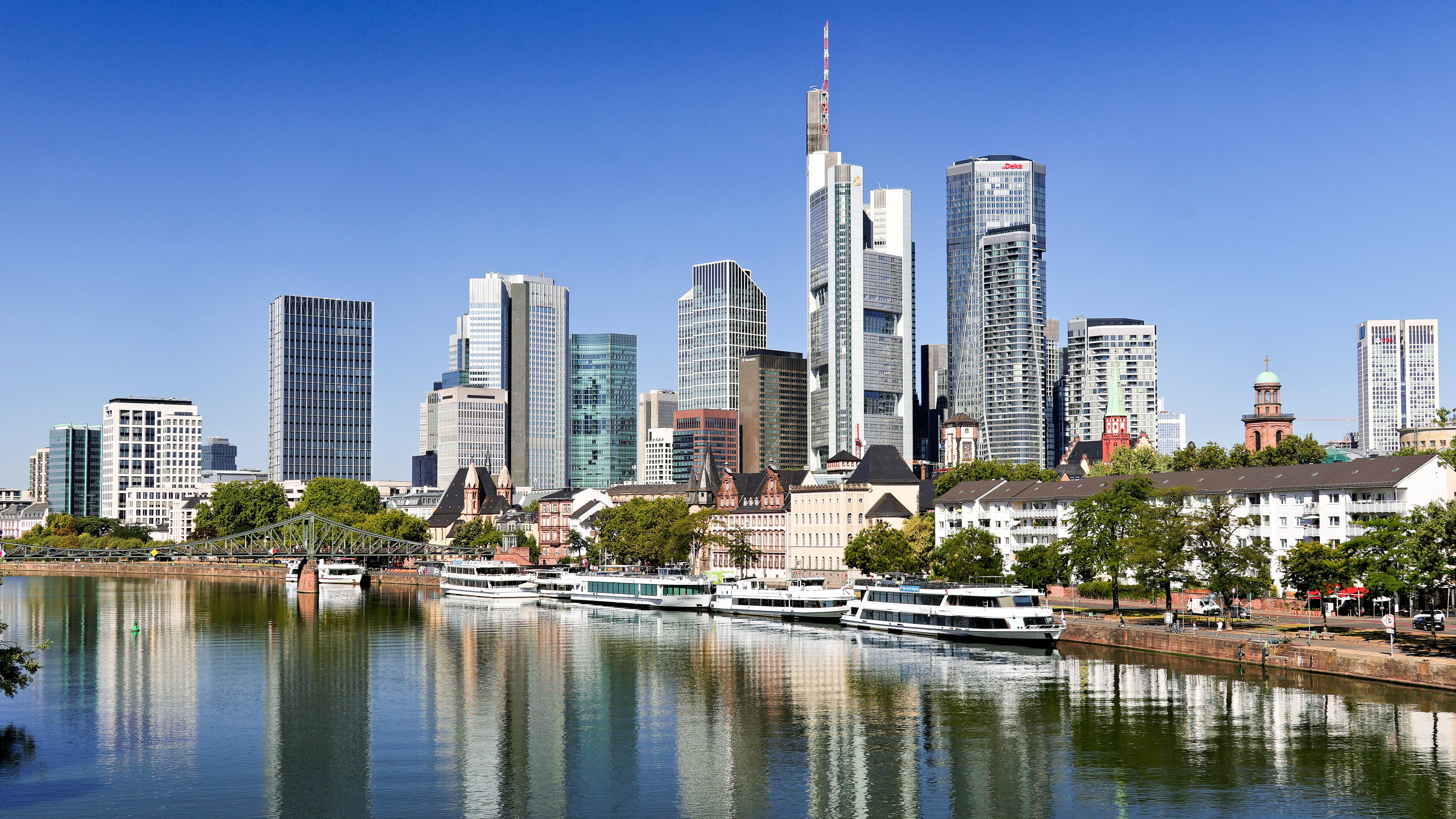
- Frankfurt's Bankenviertel in 2026
- Tallest building: Commerzbank Tower (1997)
- Tallest building height: 258.7 m (950 ft)
- Tallest structure: Europaturm (1979)
- Tallest structure height: 337.5 m (1,107 ft)
- First 150 m+ building: Westend Gate (1976)

Number of tall buildings (2026)
- Taller than 100 m (328 ft): 43 + 1 T/O (Note: Topped-out.)
- Taller than 150 m (492 ft): 20
- Taller than 200 m (656 ft): 6

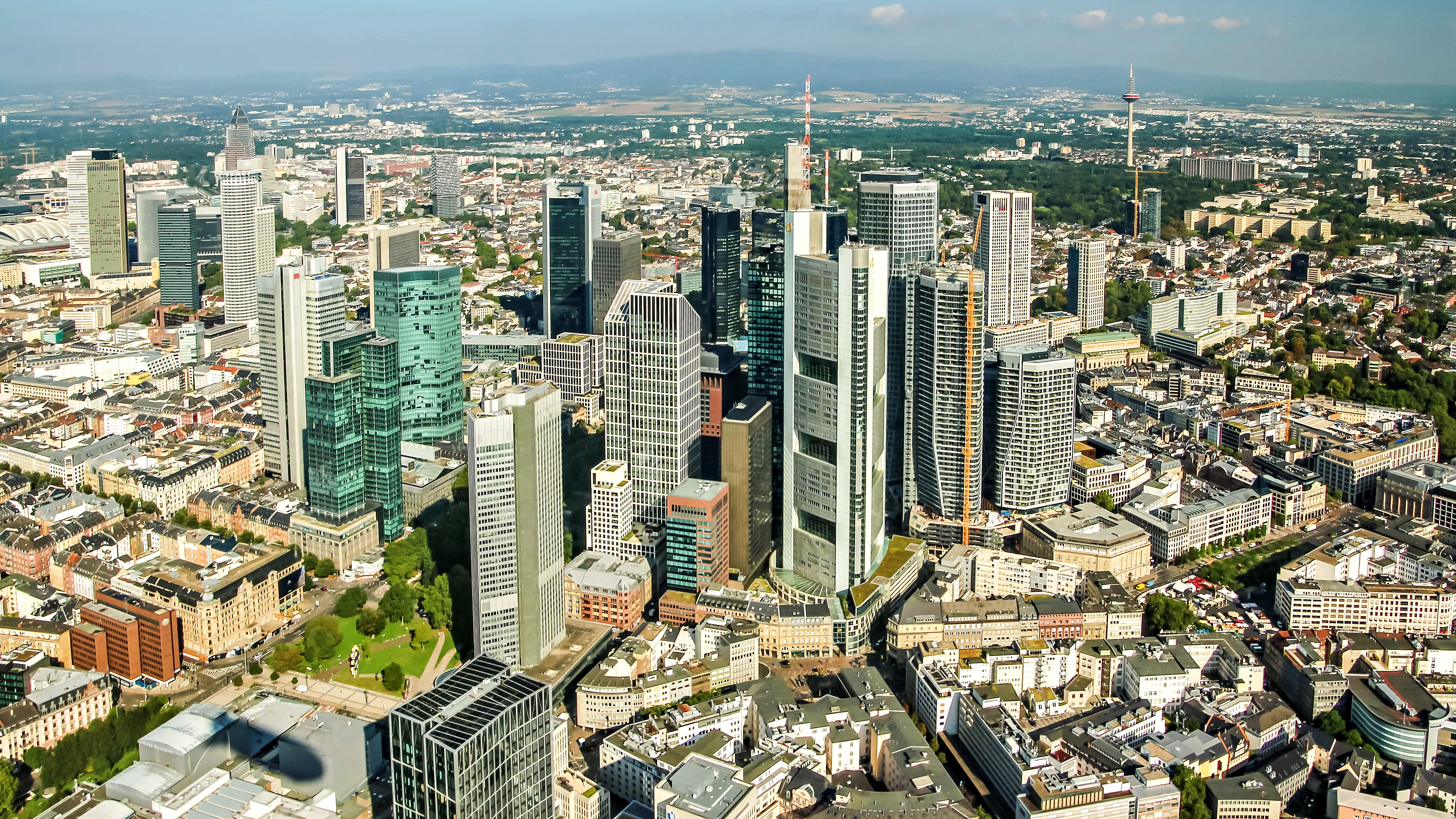
Frankfurt's skyline in 2024

Frankfurt is the most populous city in the German state of Hesse. Sitting at the heart of the Rhine-Main metropolitan region, which has a population of over 5.9 million, Frankfurt is considered the financial capital of Germany. Frankfurt is one of the few European cities with a sizeable concentration of tall buildings in its city centre. The city is often referred to as "Mainhattan", a portmanteau of Manhattan and the river of Main that runs through the city. Frankfurt is home to the majority of Germany's skyscrapers, including its 15 tallest. Its skyline is one of the largest in the European Union, and by far the largest in Germany.

As of 2026, Frankfurt has 44 completed high-rises that reach a height of 100 metres (328 ft), 20 of which are taller than 150 m (492 ft). The tallest building in Frankfurt is the 56-storey Commerzbank Tower, which rises to a height of 259 m (850 ft) and was built in 1997. It is the second tallest building in the European Union. Reflecting the city's role as a financial centre, it houses the headquarters of Commerzbank. However, the tallest free-standing structure in the city is the Europaturm, a 337 m (1,106 ft) tall telecommunication tower, located to the north of the skyline.

After undergoing extensive bombing during World War II, which destroyed Frankfurt's medieval city centre, the city mostly embraced modernist architecture during reconstruction. Frankfurt's high-rise boom began in earnest during the 1970s, and the construction of new skyscrapers has been steady since. Frankfurt has nearly doubled the size of its skyline in the 21st century, with 22 buildings taller than 100 m (328 ft) in 2000, compared to 43 today. A major addition in the 2020s is the mixed-use Four complex in 2025, consisting of four skyscrapers, the tallest of which is Frankfurt's third tallest building.

Most of Frankfurt's high-rises are located in the central districts of Innenstadt, Westend-Süd, and Bahnhofsviertel, north of the Main river, which form an area commonly known as Bankenviertel (Banking Quarter) with no exact borders. Another growing cluster of high-rises has developed in Gallus around the Europaviertel (European Quarter). There are a few buildings taller than 100 m (328 ft) dispersed outside these areas, the most notable of which is the headquarters of the European Central Bank, which sits on the Main to the east of the city centre.

== History ==
Number of buildings by height in Frankfurt by the end of each year, including demolished buildings. Click on the legend to toggle a specific height on or off. View chart definition.

=== 1940s–1960s ===
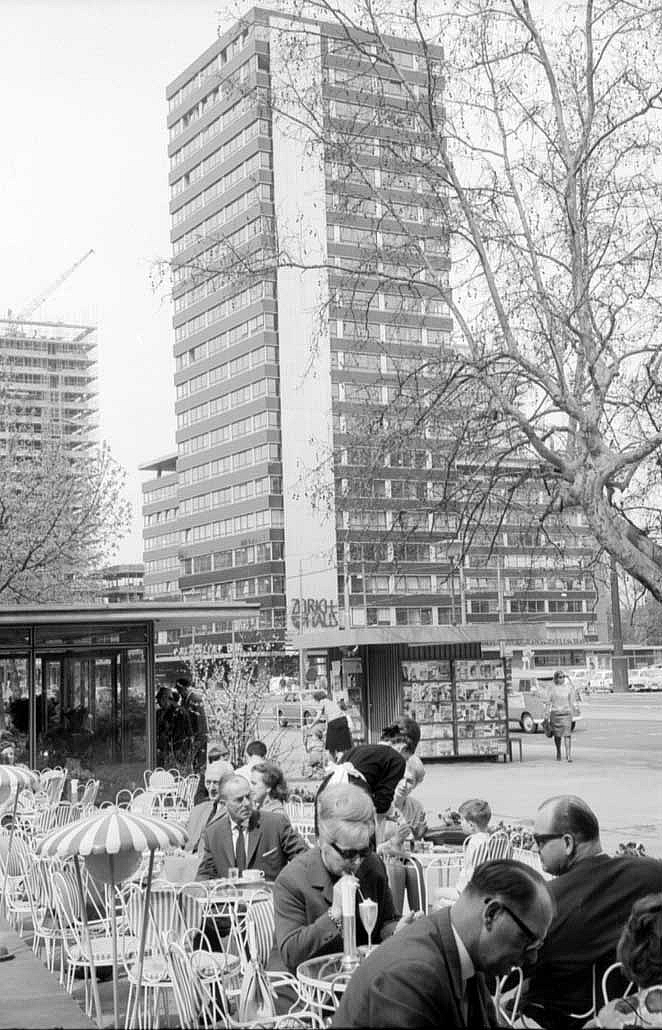
Zürich-Haus, first high-rise to surpass 50 meters in height

Frankfurt had a few buildings that could be considered high-rises before World War II, such as the IG Farben Building, Mousonturm, and the Gewerkschaftshaus, though none of them surpassed ten storeys. As one of Germany's largest cities, Frankfurt was extensively bombed by Allied forces throughout the war, mainly between 1940 and 1945, leading to the destruction of much of its city centre. Reconstruction of the city took place from 1945, during which simpler buildings designed in the modernist style were preferred, as they were quicker to build.

The first high-rises would only appear in the 1960s, however, the first building to surpass 50 m (164 ft) was the Zürich-Haus with a height of 68 meters (223 ft). It was built between 1958 and 1960 by Zürich Insurance based on designs by architects Udo von Schauroth and Werner Stücheli. Another of the city's first high-rises, the Büro Center Nibelungenplatz (now City Gate), being built outside of the city centre, in the Nordend-West district, in 1966. The tower, originally built for Shell, was part of a development plan comprising the entire northern Alleenring, the ringroad surrounding Frankfurt. However, while not an inhabitable building, the grain storage silo of Henninger Turm was completed earlier in 1961 at a height of 120 m (394 ft), with a circular observation tower.

=== 1970s–1980s ===
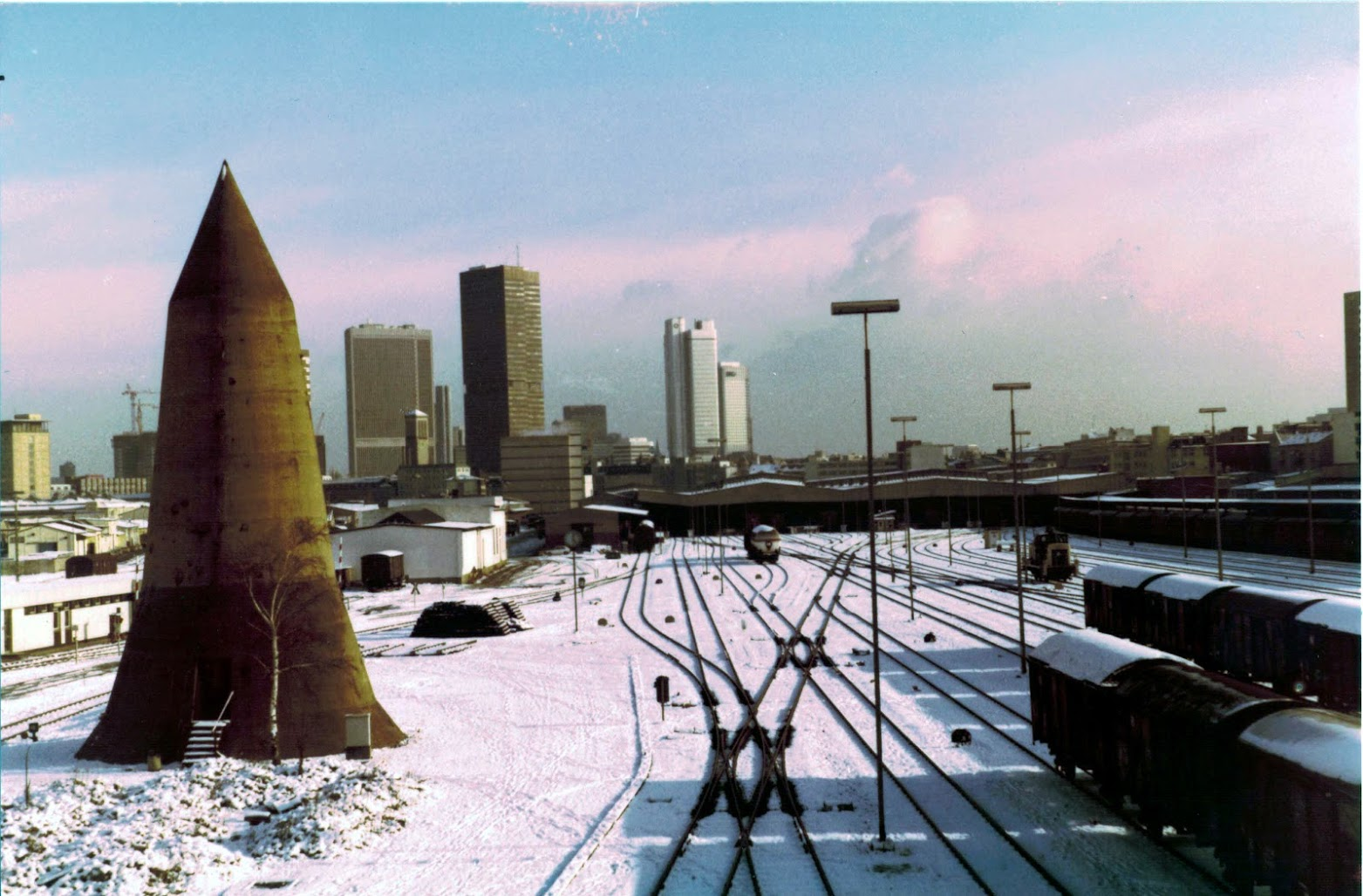
Frankfurt's skyline in the winter of 1979

From the 1970s onward, high-rise development would mostly occur in the city centre, brought about by increasing demand for office space, and initially concentrated in the district of Westend. The area around these new skyscrapers would come to be known as Bankenviertel. The first building taller than 100 m (328 ft) in the city, AfE-Turm, was located there. Built in 1972, it formed part of the Bockenheim campus of the Johann Wolfgang Goethe University, and until 2013, housed the offices and seminar rooms of the departments of Social Sciences and Education. It was Frankfurt's tallest building for two years, being surpassed by City-Haus in 1974. The 142 m (466 ft) City-Haus was also known as "Selmi-Hochhaus" after the Persian builder Ali Selmi.

The title of the tallest building in Frankfurt was broken two more times in the 1970s as building heights rose, first with Westend Gate in 1976, the first skyscraper to surpass 150 m (492 ft) in height. It, too, was only the tallest building for two years, as it was surpassed by the Silberturm (Silver Tower) in 1978. These new towers served as major financial headquarters in the 1970s, including Commerzbank, Dresdner Bank, DZ Bank. Southeast of the city centre in the Sachsenhausen district, the Leonardo Royal Hotel Frankfurt was completed in 1972.

In 1974, construction began on the Europaturm ("Europe Tower") telecommunication tower, which was completed in 1979 north of the city centre. At 338 m (1,107 ft), it was the tallest free-standing structure in West Germany; however, it was bested by the Fernsehturm Berlin, which is over 30 metres (98 ft) taller. Skyscraper construction slowed down slightly in the 1980s, as only four high-rises above 100 m (328 ft) were completed in that decade, compared to nine in the 1970s. The most significant skyscrapers built in this period were the Deutsche Bank Twin Towers, built as the headquarters for Deutsche Bank. The trapezoidal towers feature a reflective glass facade.

=== 1990s–2000s ===
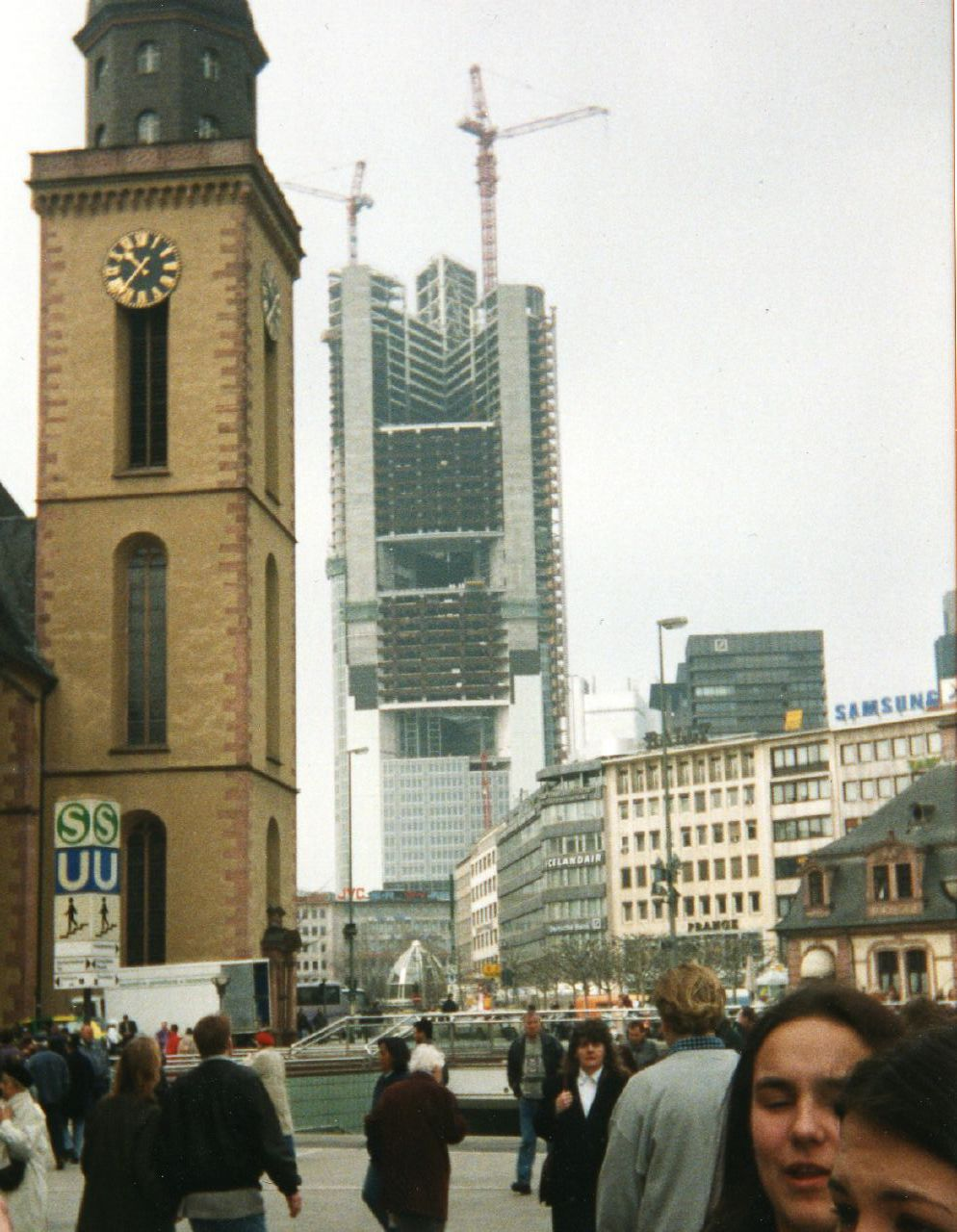
Commerzbank Tower under construction in 1996

The 1990s saw the addition of two major skyscrapers that form the two tallest icons in the skyline today. The first of these was Messeturm, completed in 1990 as the tallest building in Frankfurt, in Germany, and in all of Europe. Designed by German-American architect Helmut Jahn, the tower's postmodern form is a departure from the city's earlier skyscrapers. Its pointed design resembles the Bank of America Plaza in Atlanta and the Key Tower in Cleveland, both built around the same time. The second is Commerzbank Tower, designed by Foster & Partners as the new headquarters of Commerzbank, replacing the Global Tower built in 1973.

When Commerzbank was planned in the early 1990s, Frankfurt's Green Party, who governed the city together with the Social Democratic Party, encouraged Commerzbank to design a 'green' skyscraper. The result was the world's first so-called "ecological skyscraper": besides the use of 'sky-gardens', environmentally friendly technologies were employed to reduce energy required for heating and cooling. Other major completions included the Westendstrasse 1, then the city's second-tallest building, in 1993, and Main Tower, then Frankfurt's fourth-tallest, in 1999. Both Main Tower and Commerzbank Tower feature antenna spires that increase the building's height significantly; in the case of Commerzbank Tower, the antenna gives the building the height of a supertall skyscraper, at 300.1 m (985 ft).

Development continued into the 2000s, with the tallest new developments remaining office towers. Building heights were somewhat shorter in this decade, with the tallest building completed being Opernturm at 170 m (558 ft). Westhafen Tower was completed in 2004 in the Westhafen area, on the northern bank of the river Main. Somewhat isolated from the main Bankenviertel cluster, it forms the peak of a small group of high-rises south of the main train station.

=== 2010s–present ===
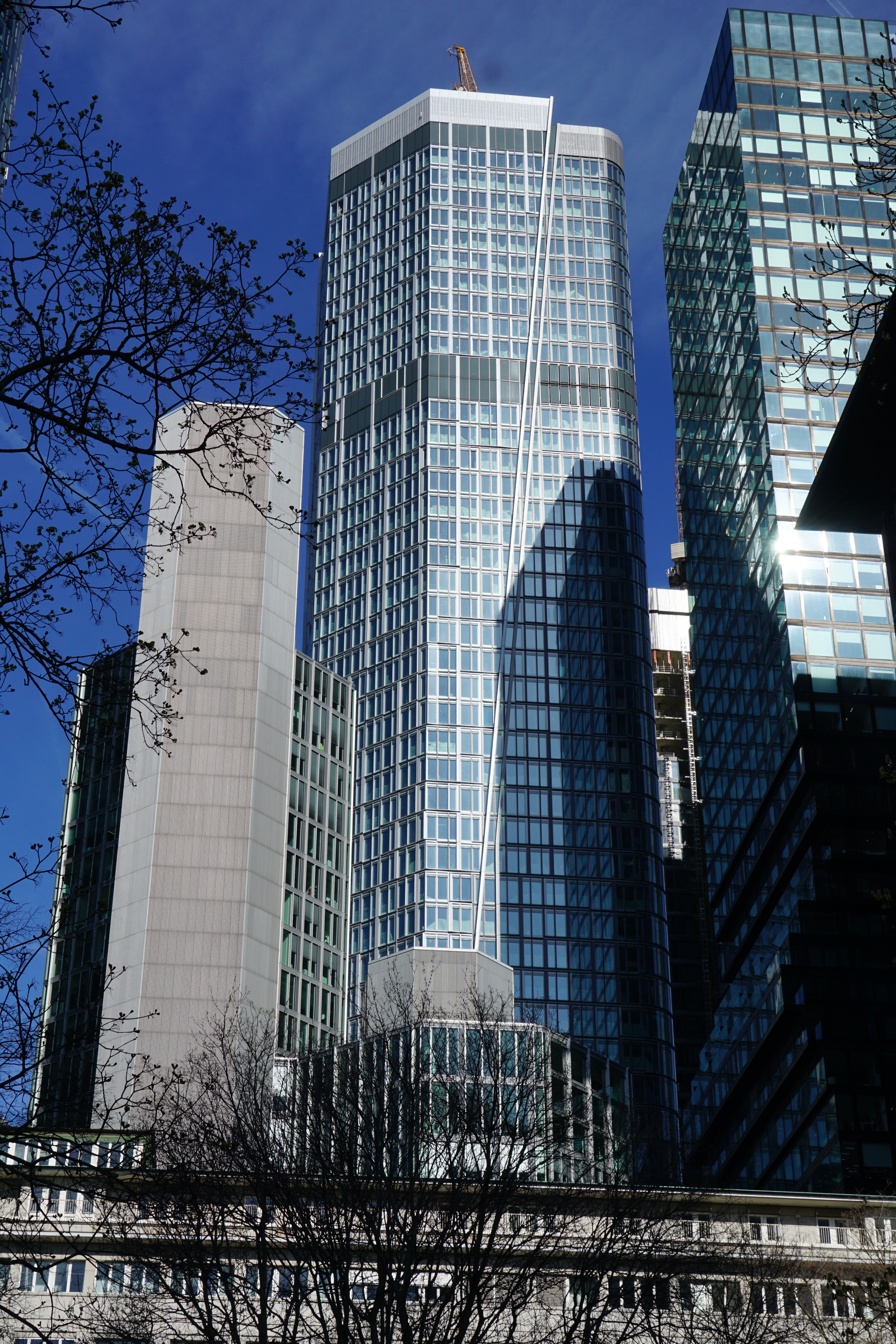
Four I, the tallest of the skyscrapers of the Four mixed-use complex

Frankfurt's building boom was mostly unaffected by the Great Recession, and an uptick in height took place in 2010s compared to the previous decade. Four skyscrapers taller than 150 m (492 ft) were completed in this decade, the tallest of which is Tower 185 in 2011. The second tallest was the new seat of the European Central Bank, completed in 2014. The central bank's previously resided in the Eurotower, which was built during the building boom of the 1970s. The building's history dates back to 2002 with the launch of a design competition. The architectural concept of the building is a "monolithic block" divided by a "hyperbolic cut", and then further twisted and filled with glass atriums. The tower stands alone from other high-rises, to the east of the skyscrapers in Bankenviertel, creating a "counterpoint" to the main skyline.

The increasing demand for real estate, the exit of the United Kingdom from the European Union, and a favorable economic development in Germany led to a boom in high-rise construction from 2015 onwards. With the 180 m (591 ft) Grand Tower, Germany's tallest residential high-rise has been located in Frankfurt am Main since its completion in 2020. After Brexit, Commerzbank Tower briefly regained the title of the tallest building in the European Union, which had been surpassed by The Shard in London in 2012. It would soon lose it again to Varso Tower in Warsaw in 2022, although Commerzbank Tower remains taller by roof height.

AfE-Turm, formerly Frankfurt's tallest building, was demolished in 2014, as the university's departments of Social Sciences and Education moved out in 2013. It was replaced with the Senckenberg-Quarter in 2023, including the One Forty West skyscraper. One Forty West has a distinctive parametric facade on its upper floors, reflecting a growth in skyscrapers with unique designs, such as the glass-clad Omniturm in 2020, with a notable "hip curve" halfway up the building. The Henninger Turm grain silo was demolished in 2013, with a new 140 m (460 ft)-tall residential skyscraper built in its place. The tower, completed in 2017, deliberately evokes the shape of the old silo, making it one of Frankfurt's most distinctive buildings.

In 2018, construction started on Four, a major mixed-use skyscraper project consisting of four towers, hence the name. The site was originally owned by Deutsche Bank, which commissioned a design competition for a new office tower, but plans were shelved in the 2000s, and the siste was sold to developer Groß & Partner. The towers sit on a shared podium, and feature vertical "kinks" that provide more sunlight on the lower floors. The tallest of the buildings, Four I, is currently Frankfurts third tallest building.

== Cityscape ==
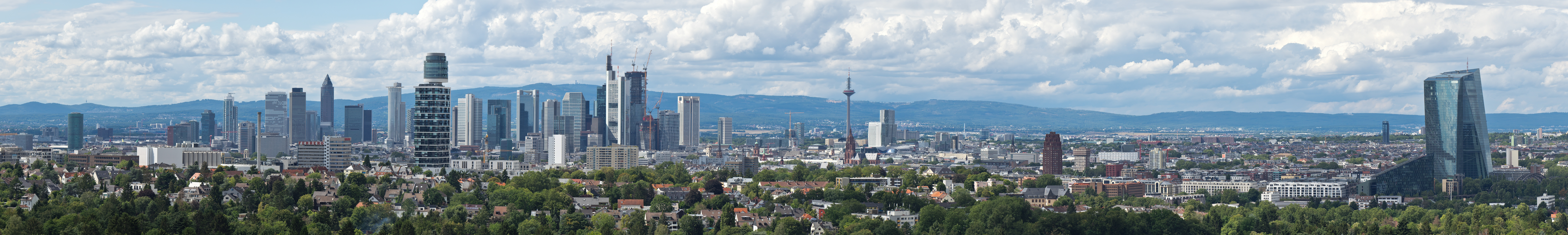
Frankfurt from the Goethe Tower, featuring the skyscrapers of Europaviertel (left), Bankenviertel and the new Henninger Turm (centre-left), Europaturm (centre) and the Seat of the European Central Bank (far right)

== Map of tallest buildings ==
This map displays the location of buildings taller than 100 m (328 ft) in Frankfurt. Each marker is coloured by the decade of the building's completion. There area a total of five high-rises taller than 100 m (328 ft) that are located outside the scope of the map: the Seat of the European Central Bank, Henninger Turm, Westhafen Tower, Büro Center Nibelungenplatz, and Leonardo Royal Hotel Frankfurt.

Buildings taller than 100 m (328 ft) in Frankfurt. An asterisk (*) next to the building's name indicates it is located outside the map.
- 1960s
- 1970s
- 1980s
- 1990s
- 2000s
- 2010s
- 2020s
1 Commerzbank Tower
2 Messeturm
3 Four I
4 Westendstrasse 1
5 Main Tower
6 Tower 185
7 ONE
8 Omniturm
9 Trianon
10 Seat of the ECB*
11 Grand Tower
12 Four II
13 Opernturm
14 Taunusturm
15 Silberturm
16 Westend Gate
17 Deutsche Bank I
18 Deutsche Bank II
19 Marienturm
20 Skyper
21 Eurotower
22 One Forty West
23 Frankfurter Büro Center
24 City-Haus
25 Henninger Turm*
26 Gallileo
27 Nextower
28 Pollux
29 The Spin
30 Four III
31 Garden Tower
32 Sparda-Bank Tower
33 Messe Torhaus
34 Park Tower
35 Japan Center
36 Westhafen Tower*
37 IBC Tower
38 Büro Center Nibelungenplatz*
39 Eurotheum
40 WinX
41 Global Tower
42 Senckenberg Turm
43 Four IV
44 Leonardo Royal Hotel Frankfurt*

== Tallest buildings ==
This lists ranks the tallest buildings in Frankfurt that stand at least 100 metres (328 ft) tall as of 2026, based on standard height measurement. This includes spires and architectural details but does not include antenna masts. Only habitable building are ranked which excludes radio masts and towers, observation towers, steeples, chimneys and other tall architectural structures. These buildings are included for comparison. The "Year" column indicates the year of completion.

* Was the tallest building in Frankfurt upon completion
Topped out but not yet completed

Rank	Name	Image	Location	Height m (ft)	Floors	Year	Purpose	Notes
N/A	Europaturm		Bockenheim; Ginnheimer Stadtweg 90 50°08′07″N 8°39′17″E	337.5 (1,107)	N/A	1979	Communication	Television tower. Second-tallest structure in Germany after the Fernsehturm Berlin. Due to its shape, it has been given the nickname Ginnheimer Spargel (Ginnheim Asparagus). Not a habitable structure; included for comparison purposes.
1	Commerzbank Tower*		Innenstadt; Große Gallusstraße 17–19 50°06′40″N 8°40′28″E	258.7 (849)	56	1997	Office	Tallest building in Europe from 1997 to 2003. Tallest building in the European Union from 1997 to 2011, and from 2020 to 2021. Tallest building in Frankfurt and in Germany since 1997. Tallest building completed in Frankfurt in the 1990s. Height including the antenna is 300 metres. Headquarters of Commerzbank.
2	Messeturm*		Westend-Süd; Friedrich-Ebert-Anlage 49 50°06′45″N 8°39′10″E	256.5 (842)	63	1990	Office	Tallest building in Frankfurt, in Germany, and in Europe from 1990 to 1997. Its main tenants are Goldman Sachs and Thomson Reuters.
3	Four I		Innenstadt; Große Gallusstraße 10-14; 50°06′44″N 8°40′25″E	233 (764)	59	2025	Mixed-use	Topped out in 2025. Has the highest habitable floor of any building in Frankfurt, ignoring mechanical floors. Tallest building completed in Frankfurt in the 2020s.
4	Westendstrasse 1		Westend-Süd; Westendstraße 1; 50°06′38″N 8°39′45″E	208 (682)	53	1993	Office	Headquarters of DZ Bank.
5	Main Tower		Innenstadt; Neue Mainzer Straße 52–58; 50°06′45″N 8°40′20″E	200 (656)	55	1999	Office	Including the antenna, the building's height is 240 metres (787 ft).
6	Tower 185		Gallus; Friedrich-Ebert-Anlage 35–37; 50°06′36″N 8°39′21″E	200 (656)	55	2011	Office	Tallest building completed in Frankfurt in the 2010s.
7	ONE		Innenstadt; Osloer Straße; 50°06′37″N 8°39′13″E	190.9 (626)	49	2022	Mixed-use	Mixed-use hotel and office skyscraper, with a hotel operated by NH Hotel Group. There is a public bar with a surrounding roof terrace near the roof.
8	Omniturm		Innenstadt; Große Gallusstraße 16–18; 50°06′42″N 8°40′23″E	189.9 (623)	45	2020	Mixed-use	Mixed-use office and residential skyscraper.
9	Trianon		Westend-Süd; Mainzer Landstraße 16–24; 50°06′46″N 8°40′00″E	186 (610)	45	1993	Office	
10	Seat of the European Central Bank		Ostend; Sonnemannstraße / Rückertstraße; 50°06′33″N 8°42′12″E	183.7 (603)	45	2014	Office	New seat of the European Central Bank. Including the antenna, the building has a height of 201 metres (659 ft).
11	Grand Tower		Gallus; Osloer Straße/Europa-Allee; 50°06′31″N 8°39′16″E	179.9 (590)	51	2020	Residential	Tallest residential building in Frankfurt and in Germany.
12	Four II		Innenstadt; Große Gallusstraße; 50°06′43″N 8°40′28″E	178 (584)	47	2025	Residential	Topped out in 2025. Second tallest residential building in Germany.
13	Opernturm		Westend-Süd; Bockenheimer Landstraße 2–4; 50°06′58″N 8°40′13″E	170 (558)	42	2009	Office	Tallest building completed in Frankfurt in the 2000s.
14	Taunusturm		Innenstadt; Taunustor 1-3; 50°06′39″N 8°40′22″E	170 (558)	40	2014	Office	The project developer is real estate building and operating company Tishman Speyer.
15	Silberturm*		Bahnhofsviertel; Jürgen-Ponto-Platz 1; 50°06′35″N 8°40′09″E	166.3 (546)	32	1978	Office	Tallest building in Frankfurt and in Germany from 1978 to 1991. Also known by its English name, Silver Tower. Former headquarters of Dresdner Bank which merged with Commerzbank in 2009. Main tenant is now Deutsche Bahn. Tallest building completed in Frankfurt in the 1970s.
16	Westend Gate*		Westend-Süd; Hamburger Allee 2–4; 50°06′52″N 8°39′02″E	159.3 (523)	47	1976	Mixed-use	Tallest building in Frankfurt and in Germany from 1976 to 1978. Mixed-use office and hotel skyscraper.
17	Deutsche Bank I		Westend-Süd; Taunusanlage 12; 50°06′50″N 8°40′05″E	155 (509)	40	1984	Office	Tallest twin towers in Frankfurt. Tallest buildings completed Frankfurt in the 1980s. Headquarters of Deutsche Bank. Their nicknames are Soll und Haben (Asset and Liability).
18	Deutsche Bank II		Westend-Süd; Taunusanlage 12; 50°06′51″N 8°40′06″E	155 (509)	38	1984	Office	Tallest twin towers in Frankfurt. Tallest buildings completed Frankfurt in the 1980s. Headquarters of Deutsche Bank. Their nicknames are Soll und Haben (Asset and Liability).
19	Marienturm		Bahnhofsviertel; Taunusanlage 9–10; 50°06′44″N 8°40′07″E	155 (509)	37	2019	Office	
20	Skyper		Bahnhofsviertel; Taunusanlage 1; 50°06′38″N 8°40′10″E	153.8 (505)	38	2004	Office	
21	Eurotower		Innenstadt; Willy-Brandt-Platz 2; 50°06′34″N 8°40′26″E	148 (486)	39	1977	Office	
22	One Forty West		Westend-Süd; Senckenberganlage 15; 50°06′58″N 8°39′05″E	145 (476)	41	2020	Mixed-use	Mixed-use hotel and residential skyscraper.
23	Frankfurter Büro Center		Westend-Süd; Mainzer Landstraße; 50°06′41″N 8°39′52″E	142.4 (467)	40	1980	Office	
24	City-Haus*		Westend-Süd; Platz der Republik 6; 50°06′37″N 8°39′35″E	142.1 (466)	42	1974	Office	Tallest building in Frankfurt from 1974 to 1976.
25	Henninger Turm		Sachsenhausen; Hainer Weg 60-64; 50°05′50″N 8°41′36″E	140 (459)	40	2017	Residential	Built on the site of a demolished grain storage silo under the same name. Also known as Neuer Henniger Turm (New Henniger Turm).
26	Gallileo		Bahnhofsviertel; Gallusanlage 7; 50°06′34″N 8°40′16″E	136 (446)	38	2003	Office	
27	Nextower		Innenstadt; Thurn-und-Taxis-Platz 6; 50°06′56″N 8°40′50″E	136 (446)	34	2010	Office	
28	Pollux		Gallus; Platz der Einheit 1; 50°06′39″N 8°39′18″E	130 (427)	33	1997	Office	
29	The Spin		Europaviertel; Güterplatz; 50°06′27″N 8°39′18″E	128 (420)	31	2023	Mixed-use	Mixed-use office and hotel skyscraper.
30	Four III		Innenstadt; Junghofstraße; 50°06′45″N 8°40′29″E	128 (420)	30	2025	Residential	Also known as FOUR Frankfurt 3.
31	Garden Tower		Innenstadt; Neue Mainzer Straße 46-50; 50°06′44″N 8°40′21″E	127 (417)	25	1976	Office	
32	Sparda-Bank Tower		Europaviertel; Europa-Allee/Emser Brücke 50°06′32″N 8°38′34″E	123.1 (404)	34	2026	Mixed-use	Mixed-use office and hotel building.
33	Messe Torhaus		Bockenheim; Ludwig-Erhard-Anlage 1; 50°06′42″N 8°38′35″E	117 (384)	30	1985	Office	
34	Park Tower		Westend-Süd; Bockenheimer Anlage 46; 50°07′01″N 8°40′14″E	115 (377)	29	1972	Office	Also known as one word, Parktower. Originally 96 m (316 ft) tall. Its height was increased to its 115 m (377 ft) during a renovation from 2005 to 2007.
35	Japan Center		Innenstadt; Taunustor 2; 50°06′40″N 8°40′21″E	115 (377)	27	1996	Office	
36	Westhafen Tower		Gutleutviertel; Westhafenplatz 1; 50°06′05″N 8°39′52″E	112.3 (368)	31	2003	Office	
37	IBC Tower		Bockenheim; Theodor-Heuss-Allee 70; 50°06′53″N 8°38′33″E	112 (367)	30	2003	Office	
38	City Gate*		Nordend-West; Nibelungenplatz 3 50°07′44″N 8°41′31″E	110 (361)	27	1993	Office	Originally built in 1966 at 85 m (279 ft) tall, its height was increased to 110 m (361 ft) during a renovation in 1993. Also known as Büro Center Nibelungenplatz. Tallest building in Frankfurt from 1966 to 1972. Tallest building completed in Frankfurt in the 1960s.
39	Eurotheum		Innenstadt; Neue Mainzer Straße 66–68; 50°06′47″N 8°40′19″E	110 (361)	31	1999	Mixed-use	Mixed-use residential and office tower.
40	WinX		Innenstadt; Neue Mainzer Straße 6–12; 50°06′31″N 8°40′35″E	110 (361)	30	2017	Mixed-use	Mixed-use residential and office skyscraper. Part of the Maintor area which includes several buildings and two smaller highrises.
41	Global Tower		Innenstadt; Neue Mainzer Straße 32-36; 50°06′39″N 8°40′25″E	108.6 (356)	28	1973	Office	Also known by its address, Neue Mainzer Straße 32-36.
42	Senckenberg Turm		Westend-Süd; Robert Mayer Straße 5; 50°07′00″N 8°39′02″E	106 (348)	26	2022	Office	Also known as the T-Rex Hybrid High-rise.
43	Four IV		Innenstadt; Junghofstraße; 50°06′46″N 8°40′26″E	100 (328)	25	2025	Office	Also known as FOUR Frankfurt 4.
44	Leonardo Royal Hotel Frankfurt		Sachsenhausen-Süd; Mailänder Straße 1; 50°05′29″N 8°41′27″E	100 (328)	25	1972	Hotel	Tallest hotel-only building in Frankfurt.

== Tallest under construction or proposed ==
=== Under construction ===
The following table ranks high-rises under construction in Frankfurt that are expected to be at least 100 m (328 ft) tall as of 2026, based on standard height measurement. The “Year” column indicates the expected year of completion. Buildings that are on hold are not included.

Name	Height m (ft)	Floors	Purpose	Year	Notes
Central Business Tower	205 (673)	52	Office	2028	

=== Proposed ===
The following table ranks approved and proposed high-rises in Frankfurt that are expected to be at least 100 m (328 ft) tall as of 2026, based on standard height measurement. The “Year” column indicates the expected year of completion. A dash “–“ indicates information about the building's height or year of completion is not available.

Name	Height m (ft)	Floors	Year	Notes
Millennium Tower 1	288 (945)	69	2030	Located on Osloer Straße. Would be Frankfurt and Germany's tallest building if built.
Kaiserkarree	195 (640)	–	2029	The skyscraper is to grow out of an existing listed building at Kaiserstrasse 30. Also called Gloria.
Das Präsidium	175 (574)	48	–	To be built on Friedrich-Ebert-Anlage 5-11 in Gallus.
Gallusanlage 8	170 (558)	–	–	
Millennium Tower 2	157 (515)	43	2030	Located on Osloer Straße.
Icoon	140 (459)	41	–	Planned as an addition to the neighbouring Commerzbank Trading Center Tower (93 metres). Located on Hafenstraße/Adam-Riese-Straße in Gallus.
Matthäuskirche Tower	130 (427)	–	–	Planned on a property behind the Matthäuskirche church, because the owning church wants to sell the whole site. The church can be partly integrated into the new building. Plans were approved in 2008. Located on Friedrich-Ebert Anlage 33 Gallus.
NION	106 (348)	–	–	Designed by architectural firm UNStudio. Located on Europa-Allee in Gallus.

== Tallest demolished ==
This table lists buildings in Frankfurt that were demolished or destroyed and at one time stood at least 90 metres (295 ft) in height.

Name	Image	Height ft (m)	Floors	Year completed	Year demolished	Notes
AfE-Turm		116.4 (382)	32	1972	2014	Tallest building in Germany from 1972 and 1974, when it was surpassed by City-Haus. Part of the Bockenheim campus of the Johann Wolfgang Goethe University, housing the offices and seminar rooms of the departments of Social Sciences and Education.
Deutsche Bank IBCF		93 (305)	21	1971	2018	Replaced by the Four (Frankfurt) project.

== Timeline of tallest buildings ==
This lists buildings that once held the title of tallest building in Frankfurt.

Name	Image	Years as tallest	Height m (ft)	Floors	Notes
Mousonturm		1926–1930	33 (108)	8	Tallest high-rise building in Frankfurt from 1926 to 1930.
IG Farben Building		1930–1960	35 (115)	7	Tallest high-rise building in Frankfurt from 1930 to 1960. Serves currently as the main building of the Westend Campus of the University of Frankfurt.
Zürich-Haus		1960–1966	68 (223)	20	Tallest building in Frankfurt from 1960 to 1966. First high-rise to surpass 50 meters in height.
City Gate		1966–1972	85 (279)	32	Tallest building in Frankfurt from 1966 to 1972. Its height was later increased to 110 m (361 ft) in 1993.
AfE-Turm		1972–1974	116 (381)	32	Demolished in 2014. First high-rise to surpass 100 meters in height.
City-Haus		1974–1976	142.1 (466)	42	
Westend Gate		1976–1978	159.3 (523)	47	Tallest building in Germany from 1976 to 1978.
Silberturm		1978–1990	166.3 (546)	32	Tallest building in Germany from 1978 to 1990. Former headquarters of Dresdner Bank which merged with Commerzbank in 2009.
Messeturm		1990–1997	256.5 (842)	63	Tallest building in Europe from 1990 to 1997.
Commerzbank Tower		1997–present	259 (850)	56	Tallest building in Europe from 1997 to 2003. Tallest building in the European Union from 1997 to 2011 and again since 2020. Tallest building in Germany since 1997. Tallest building completed in the 1990s. Height including the antenna is 300 metres. Headquarters of Commerzbank.

== See also ==
- List of tallest buildings by German federal state
- List of tallest buildings in Germany
- List of tallest buildings in Europe
