= Park Tower (Frankfurt) =

High-rise building in the Westend-Süd district of Frankfurt, Germany

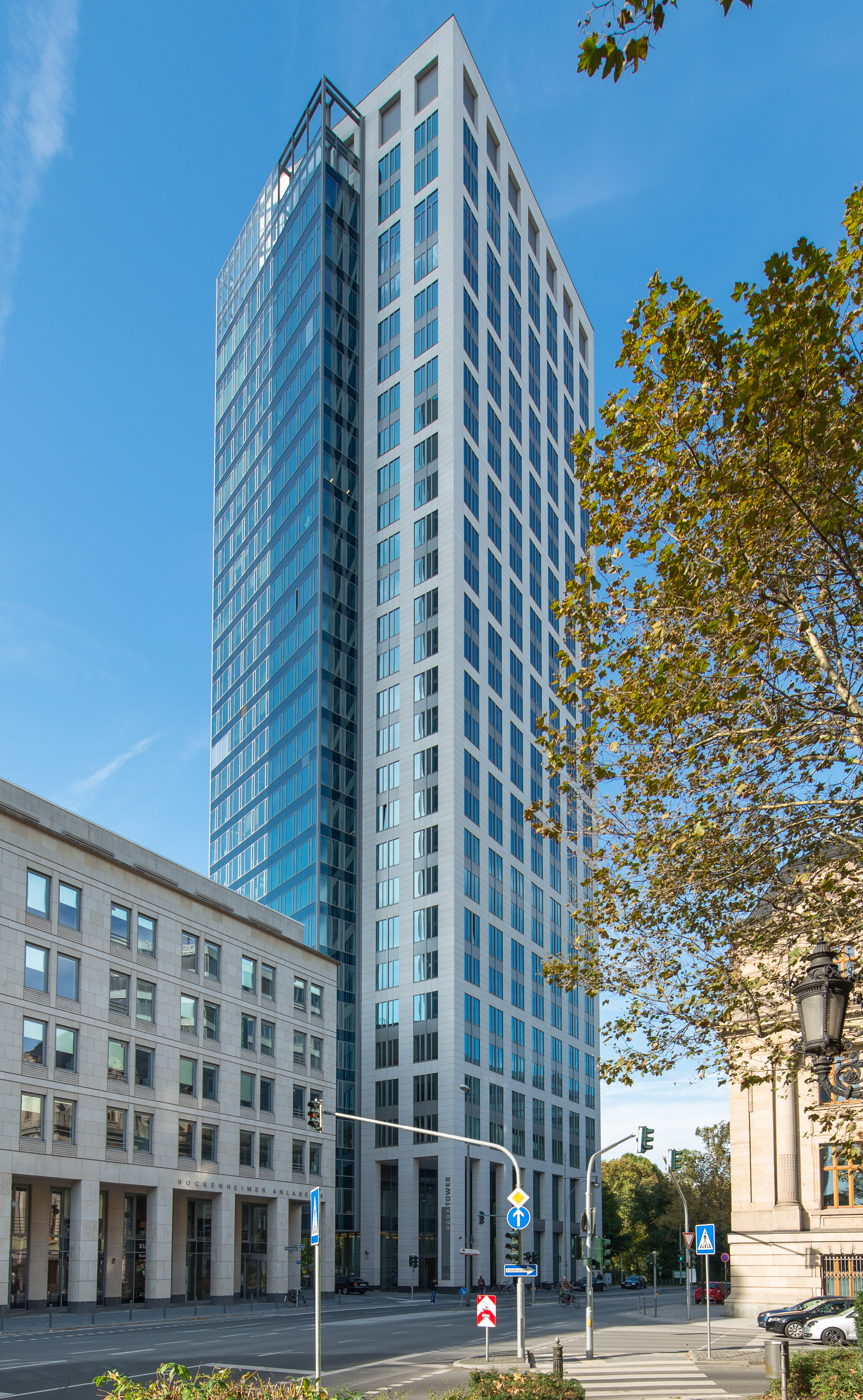
- Interactive map of the Park Tower area

General information
- Type: Commercial offices
- Location: Bockenheimer Anlage 46; Frankfurt; Hesse, Germany
- Coordinates: 50°07′01″N 8°40′14″E
- Opening: 1972

Height
- Roof: 115 m (377 ft)

Technical details
- Floor count: 28
- Floor area: 25,230 m^{2} (271,600 sq ft)

Design and construction
- Architects: Albert Speer & Partner

Other information
- Public transit access: Alte Oper; Taunusanlage; 64 Alte Oper

Park Tower, formerly known as SGZ-Hochhaus, is a high-rise building in the Westend-Süd district of Frankfurt, Germany. It was built in 1972 as the administrative headquarters of the Südwestdeutschen Genossenschafts-Zentralbank (since 2001 DZ Bank). The then 96-metre-high (315 ft) building with a black-and-silver facade was briefly the tallest skyscraper in Frankfurt. It is located in Reuterweg near the Opernplatz and stands slightly oblique to the old opera house.

Between July 2005 and autumn 2007, the building was gutted completely and radically restructured. Following plans by the architects Albert Speer & Partner, it was increased by three levels and supplemented with a second block which lies down like a stone belt around the shaft of the tower. The new building is bright and dressed with natural stone, while the old building is completely glazed. The now 115-metre-high (377 ft) building offers approximately 24,000 square metres of gross floor area.

The main tenant of the building is the internationally active law firm Freshfields Bruckhaus Deringer, which has leased almost the entire building. The owner of the property is a property company of Dietz AG, Bensheim.

== See also ==
- List of tallest buildings in Frankfurt
- List of tallest buildings in Germany
