= Global Tower =

Skyscraper in Frankfurt, Germany

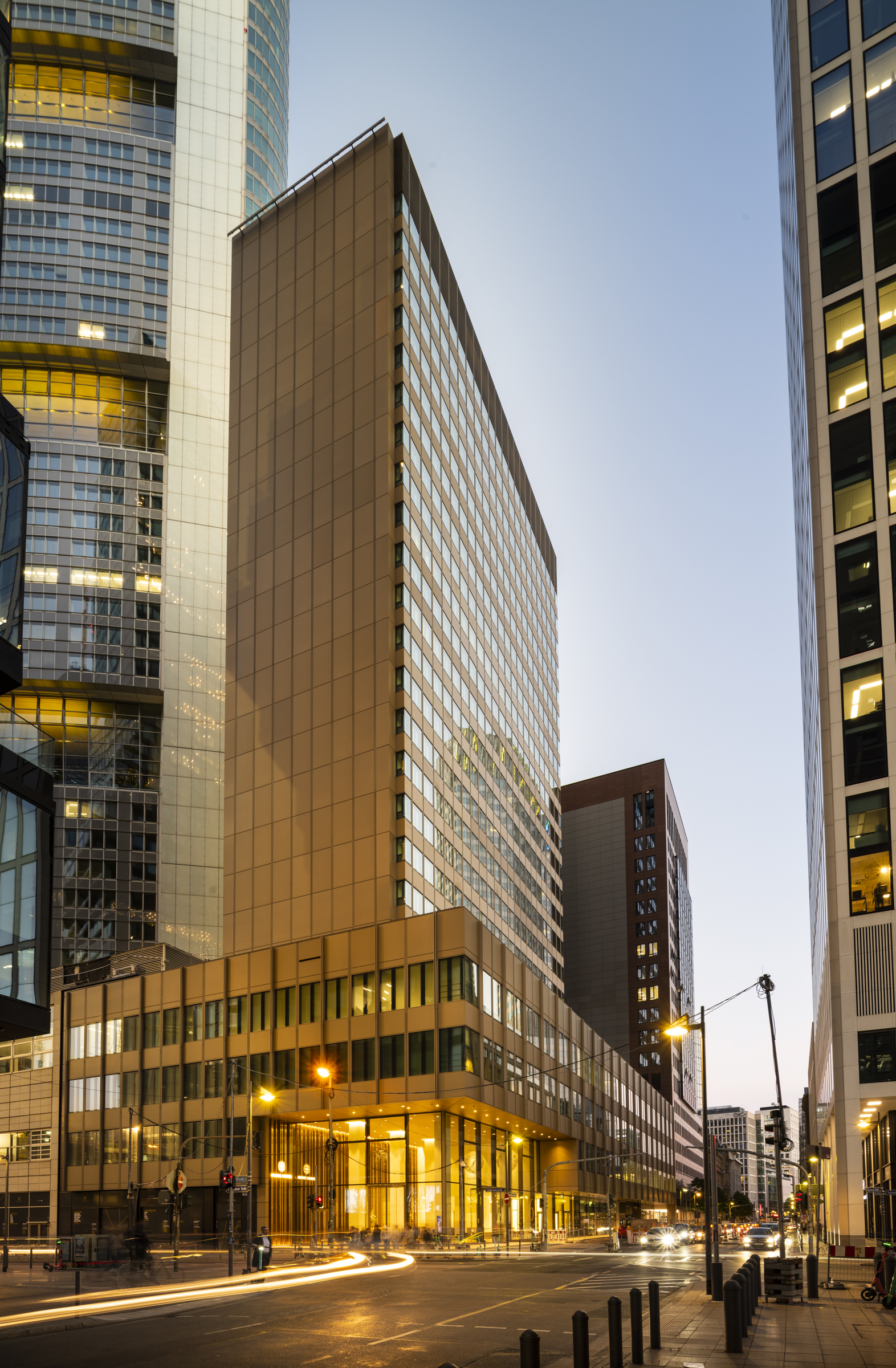
- Interactive map of the Global Tower area

General information
- Status: Completed
- Type: Office
- Location: Frankfurt, Germany, 32-36 Neue Mainzer Str., Frankfurt am Main, Germany
- Coordinates: 50.11089°N 8.67340°E
- Construction started: 1970
- Completed: 1973; 2017–2022 (renovated)
- Owner: GEG German Estate Group AG

Height
- Roof: 108.6 m (356 ft)

Technical details
- Structural system: Concrete
- Floor count: 29
- Floor area: 33,000 m^{2} (355,000 sq ft)
- Lifts/elevators: Kone

Design and construction
- Architect: Richard Heil
- Main contractor: Drees & Sommer Advanced Building

Website
- Global Tower

The Global Tower also known as the Commerzbank AG is a high-rise office building in the Innenstadt district of Frankfurt, Germany. Built between 1970 and 1973, the tower stands at 108.6 m (356 ft) tall with 29 floors and is the current 40th tallest building in Frankfurt.

== History ==
=== Architecture ===
In 1966, Commerzbank announced a competition for the building. Seven architectural firms were invited: the Frankfurt offices of Walter Maria Schultz, ABB Architekten, Max Meid & Helmut Romeick and Richard Heil, the Düsseldorf offices of HPP and Heinrich Rosskotten & Edgar Tritthart, and the international architect Ludwig Mies van der Rohe. The jury chose the design by Richard Heil because he had good contacts with the city administration and made optimal use of the site area.

The listed skyscraper is reminiscent in form, colour and materiality of famous buildings such as the Seagram Building in New York or the Toronto-Dominion Centre and is considered a prime example of the elegance and reduced style of modern architecture.

The design for the associated multifunctional auditorium – the Global Forum – was created by the British architect Norman Foster. It was added in 1994 and now has space for up to 500 people.

From 1974 to 1997, the building served as the headquarters of Commerzbank, then the administration moved to the new Commerzbank Tower, which is located on the neighboring property. A large part of it was then rented to the European Central Bank (ECB) until November 2014.

Since the completion of the revitalization, the Global Tower has been leased to various companies, including Google.

=== Renovation ===
In 2016, German Estate Group GmbH (GEG), a subsidiary of DIC Asset AG (DIC), bought the building from Commerzbank.

According to plans by Meyer Schmitz-Morkramer Architects, the high-rise was extensively revitalized from the end of 2017 to spring 2022. It was upgraded with modern office spaces up to 2.80 m high, the latest building technology with heating and cooling ceilings and mechanical ventilation, roof terraces on the 4th and 25th floors and a two-story lobby and geared to flexible, modern and sustainable requirements. As part of the revitalization, the building received a new, bronze-anodized facade with large window areas. The building's renovation and refurbishment process was officially completed on July 31, 2024 as announced by Branicks. The main developer of the project was GEG and the main manufacturer was Kone which was also responsible for the elevator equipment.

The investment volume is over 270 million euros. After completion, the Frankfurt skyscraper icon was given the name Global Tower.

== See also ==
- List of tallest buildings in Frankfurt
- List of tallest buildings in Germany
