= Omniturm =

Skyscraper in Frankfurt, Germany

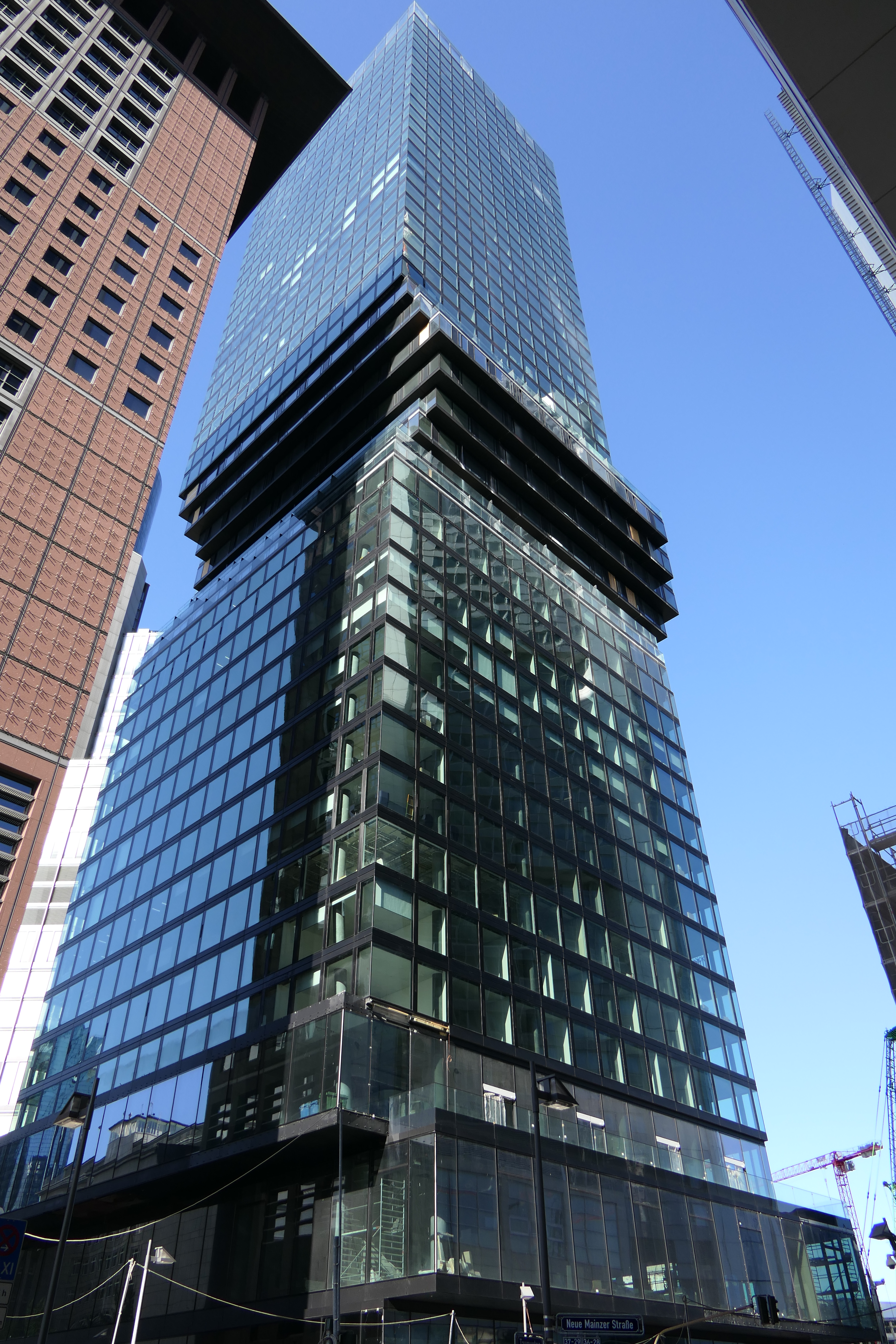
- Omniturm under construction in September 2019
- Interactive map of the Omniturm area

General information
- Status: Completed
- Location: Große Gallusstraße 16-18, Frankfurt am Main, Germany
- Coordinates: 50.1116°N 8.6732°E
- Construction started: 2017
- Completed: 2019
- Inaugurated: 2019
- Owner: Commerz Real

Height
- Height: 189.9 m

Design and construction
- Architecture firm: Bjarke Ingels Group
- Structural engineer: PfeiferINTERPLAN

Omniturm is a skyscraper in Frankfurt, Germany. It was built by the U.S. real estate company Tishman Speyer Properties from early 2016, and was completed in 2019. The building reaches a height of 190 metres (620 ft), making it the sixth-tallest building in Frankfurt and in Germany upon completion. The name (from Latin omnis 'everyone') is an allusion to the usage of the building, including both residential and office space.

== Design ==
The tower was designed by Bjarke Ingels Group.

The Omni Tower is notably characterized by a "swing" halfway up the building. The spiral axis shift from the center enables terraces for the living area between the 14th and 23rd floors. In the largest shift, the so-called "residential" area is offset by a total of more than 5 m (16 ft) from the baseline. The 49 storey tower contains 43,850 m^{2} (472,000 sq ft) of rentable office space, 8,175 m^{2} (87,990 sq ft) of living space and 1,579 m^{2} (17,000 sq ft) of publicly accessible area.

According to Designbloom, "the lower part of the building is organized as a slender and rational stack, before the floorplates start to slide outwards in a spiraling motion where the tower contains residential programming. In its uppermost portion, the structure returns to a simple tower block, rejoining the orientation of the floors below".

== Usage ==
Omniturm is a mixed-used tower. The building has a leasable area of more than 54,100 m^{2} (582,000 sq ft), with around 44,200 m^{2} (476,000 sq ft) as flexible office space. 147 premium-apartments account for a further 8,200 m^{2} (88,000 sq ft).

== Owner ==
The building was purchased by Commerz Real, an investment asset manager for Commerzbank in 2018.
