= Marienturm =

Skyscraper in Frankfurt, Germany

Coordinates: 50.1124°N 8.6687°E

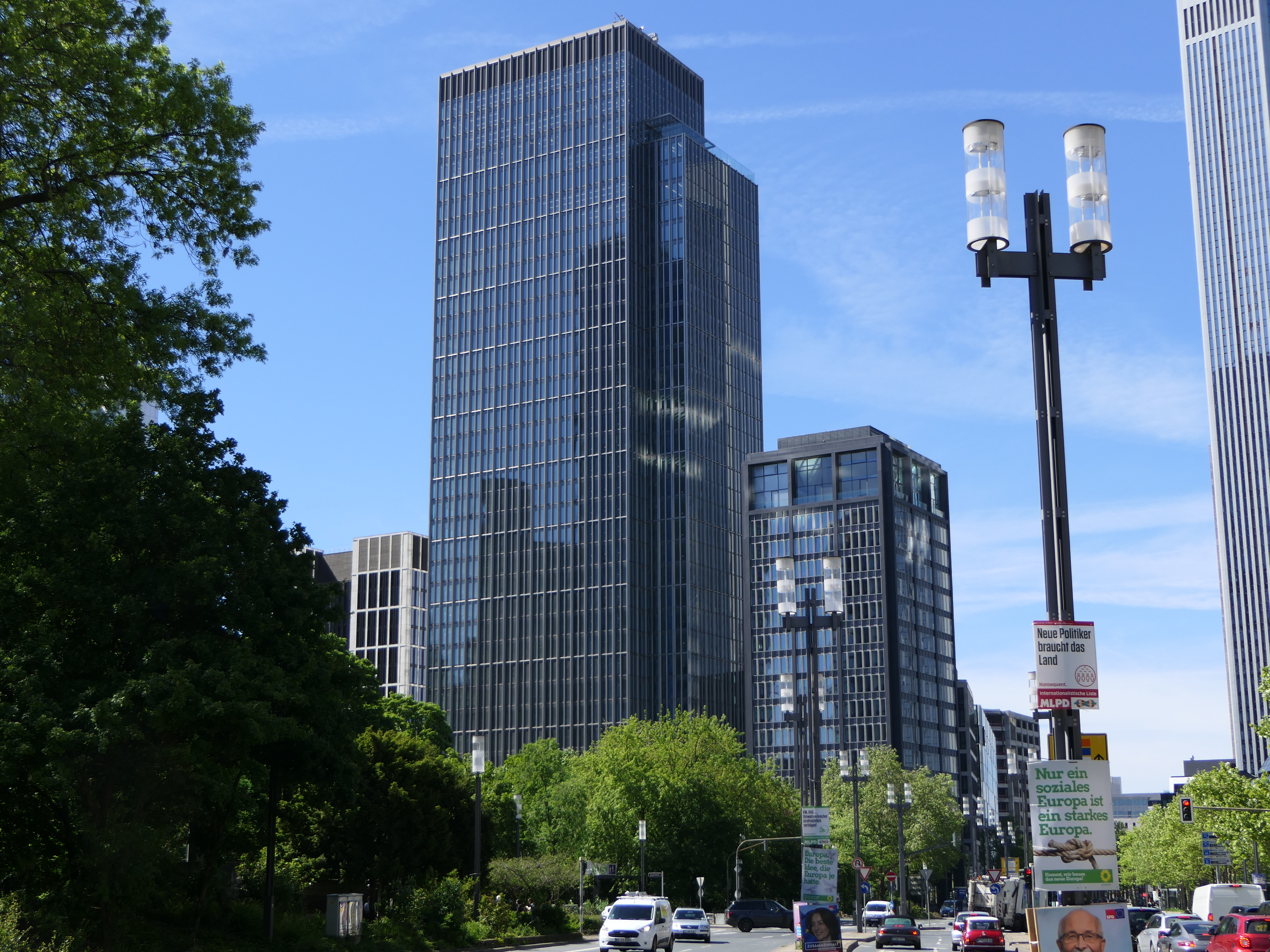
- Marienturm in May 2019
- Interactive map of the Marienturm area

General information
- Status: Completed
- Architectural style: Modernism
- Location: Taunusanlage 9/10, Frankfurt

Height
- Height: 155 m (509 ft)

Technical details
- Floor count: 38
- Floor area: 45,450 m^{2} (489,200 sq ft)

Design and construction
- Architecture firm: Thomas Müller Ivan Reimann Architekten
- Structural engineer: RSP Remmel + Sattler Ingenieurgesellschaft mbH
- Main contractor: Hochtief

Other information
- Public transit: Taunusanlage

Marienturm is a skyscraper in Frankfurt, Germany. Completed in 2019, it has a height of 155 meters, making it the 15th tallest building in Frankfurt beside Deutsche Bank Twin Towers (As of 2022). Located in the Bankenviertel, the building was built between 2015 and 2019 by real estate developer Pecan Development GmbH for a fund affiliated with Aermont Capital, and is primarily used for office space.

The building's contractor was Hochtief.

== Location ==
The tower is part of the Marieninsel project, which also contains a ten-story office building called the Marienforum.

== Design ==
The supporting structure of the building is a reinforced concrete skeleton, consisting of a flat reinforced concrete slab on each floor, and reinforced concrete columns that are arranged on the outside in the floor plan, and four reinforced concrete core areas. These serve for horizontal stiffening and are coupled to one another via the corridor ceilings and beams.

The interior design is inspired by the nearby Taunusanlage Park. The building contains a 17-metre-high lobby that acts as a transit zone between working environments and nature. This is assisted by contrasting materials, such as wood, stone, marble, and metal, and unique patterns and textures. The Marienforum has a similarly inspired design, albeit with different materials.

== Usage ==
In addition to commercial office space, a restaurant, a fitness studio, a children's day-care center and 267 underground car parks, including 77 parking spaces with electrical charging stations.

== Awards ==
The building has won several architectural awards, including the German Design Award in 2018.

== See also ==
- List of tallest buildings in Frankfurt
