= City-Haus =

Skyscraper in Frankfurt, Germany

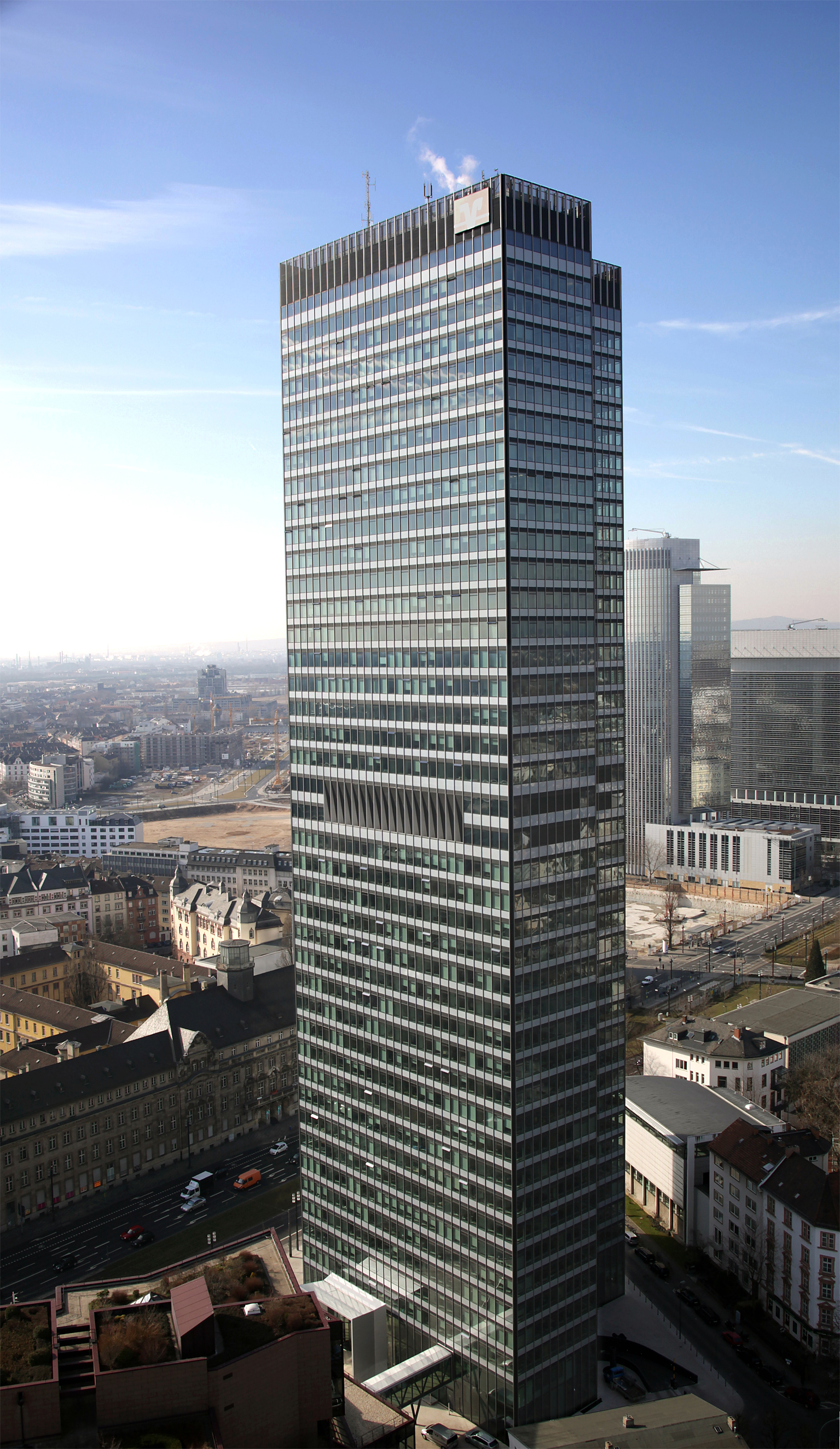
- Interactive map of the City-Haus area
- Alternative names: Selmi-Hochhaus

General information
- Type: Commercial offices
- Location: Platz der Republik 6 Frankfurt; Hesse, Germany
- Coordinates: 50°6′37″N 8°39′36″E
- Construction started: 1971
- Completed: 1974
- Owner: DZ Bank

Height
- Roof: 142 m (466 ft)

Technical details
- Floor count: 42
- Floor area: 52,000 m^{2} (560,000 sq ft)
- Lifts/elevators: 10

Design and construction
- Architects: Johannes Krahn; Richard Heill

City-Haus is a 42-storey 142.1 m (466 ft) skyscraper in the Westend-Süd district of Frankfurt, Germany. It was constructed from 1971 to 1974 and designed by architects Johannes Krahn and Richard Heil. It was the tallest building in Frankfurt from 1974–1976 until Westend Gate was constructed. Today, it is part of the headquarters of DZ Bank.

== History ==
City-Haus is also known under the name Selmi-Hochhaus after the Persian owner Ali Selmi. The project was very controversial. On the night of 23 August 1973, a fire broke out in the upper floors of the building's shell, which was widely visible throughout the city and attracted many onlookers. The fire was put out eight hours later, as at that time the Frankfurt Fire Department was not yet equipped for fire fighting on that scale. Arson was initially blamed, however, it was deemed unlikely as the cause of the fire, as defective welding tools apparently set the woodwork on the 40th and 41st floors ablaze. This fire was the starting point of modern fire protection for buildings in Germany and the start of the career of the chief fire fighter Ernst Achilles.

In 1976, the DG Bank (today: DZ Bank) purchased the tower and set up their headquarters there. In 1985, a seven-storey building called City-Haus II was built on the adjoining property and in 1993 the DZ Bank also moved into the newly built Westendstrasse 1.

== Construction ==
The building has a reinforced concrete structural frame. It consists of a centrally arranged core group with external dimensions of 17.4 m × 14.2 m and two mutually offset storey wings, each 40 m long and 14.1 m wide. Apart from the core to bear in each tract four columns arranged inside the vertical loads. Rule projectiles have a height of 3.2 m. The floor slabs are T-beam construction. The plate thickness varies between 10 cm and 20 cm, the total construction height of 40 cm and 60 cm. The tower stands on a thick bottom plate up to 4.15 m, with 2000 m^{2} of floor space.

== Renovation ==
From October 2007 to December 2008, City-Haus was redesigned by Christoph Mäckler fully refurbished with a new façade and an overall brighter appearance. During the conversion time could damage the renter will be minimized because the new façade was suspended during the week from outside the Altfassade which was just on the weekends. The new façade of the building reduced energy consumption by around 35 percent. The cost of the renovation was US$53 million.

== See also ==
- List of tallest buildings in Frankfurt
- List of tallest buildings in Germany
