= One (Frankfurt) =

Skyscraper in Frankfurt, Germany

ONE
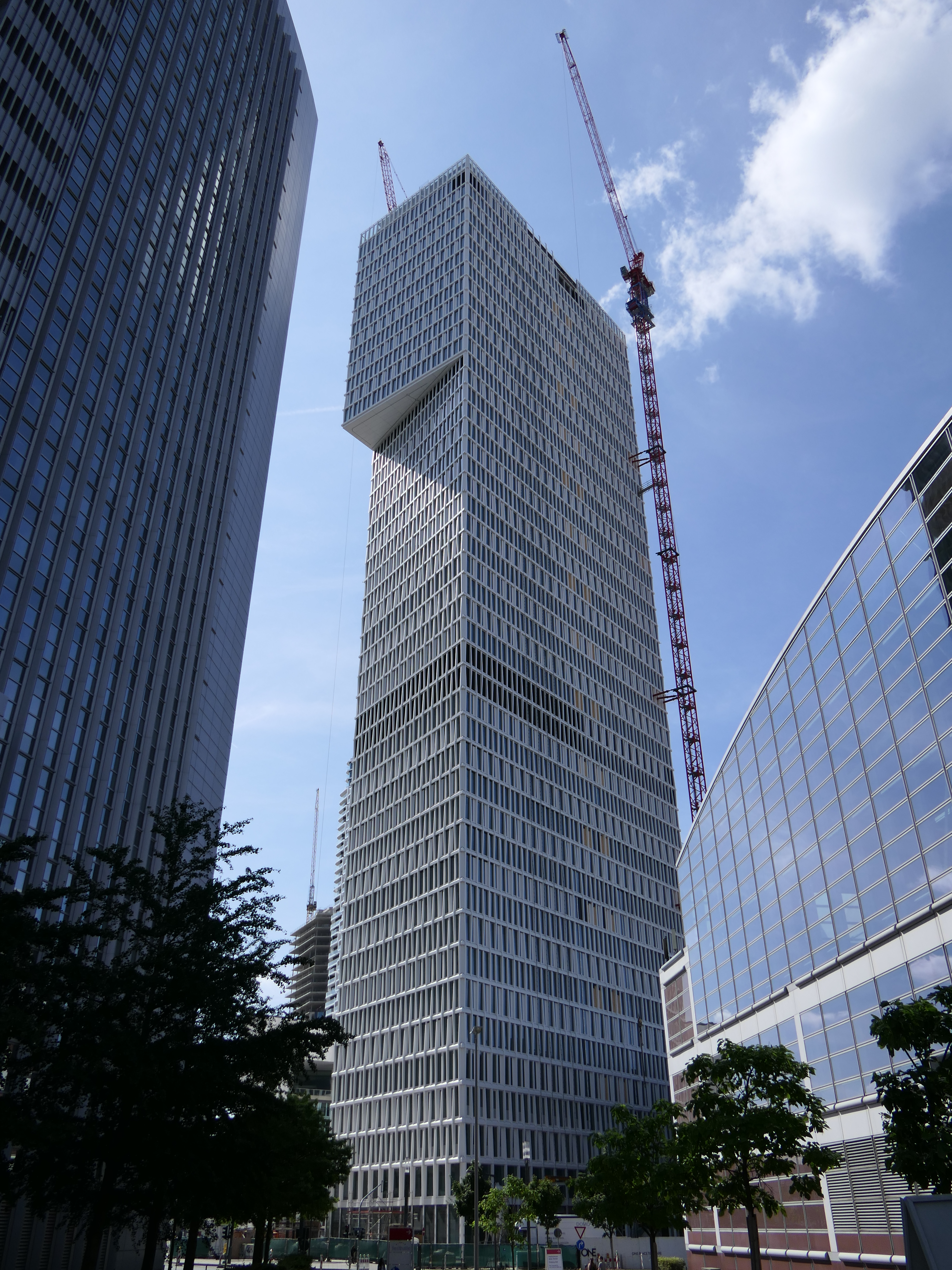
- Interactive map of the ONE area

General information
- Status: Completed
- Type: Mixed-use: Office / Hotel
- Location: Frankfurt, Germany, 1-3 Brüsseler Street, Frankfurt am Main, Germany
- Coordinates: 50.11026°N 8.65361°E
- Construction started: 2017
- Completed: 2022

Height
- Roof: 190.9 m (626 ft)

Technical details
- Structural system: Concrete
- Floor count: 49 (+3 underground)
- Floor area: 88,000 m^{2} (947,000 sq ft)
- Lifts/elevators: Kone

Design and construction
- Architect: Meurer-Architekten
- Developer: CA Immo

Website
- ONE

ONE also known as Skyline Plaza 1 is a mixed-use skyscraper in the Gallus district of Frankfurt, Germany. Built between 2017 and 2022, the tower stands at 190.9 m (626 ft) tall with 49 floors and is the current 7th tallest building in Frankfurt and Germany. It is also part of the Skyline Plaza project.

== History ==
=== Architecture ===
In 2014, the Frankfurt-based firm Meurer Architektur und Stadtplanung won the competition for a new high-rise building on the site of a former railway station with its design. The cost of the building is estimated at over 330 million euros. The site preparations for the construction work began in the summer of 2017. The foundation stone was laid in October 2018. The completion of the building was initially planned for 2021, but was delayed to June 2022.

The skyscraper houses a 4-star hotel, a conference center, office spaces, and a sky bar called "NFT". The hotel houses a total of 375 rentable rooms and is operated by the NH Hotel Group. The conference center displays an area of around 1,000 m^{2}. The public sky bar has a wraparound roof terrace at the 47th floor, at height of 185 meters, making it the highest bar in a skyscraper in Germany.

While the hotel and conference area occupies the first 14 floors, the 15th and 16th floors are used as co-working areas. In the areas above, 42,000 square meters of office space are available.

== Gallery ==
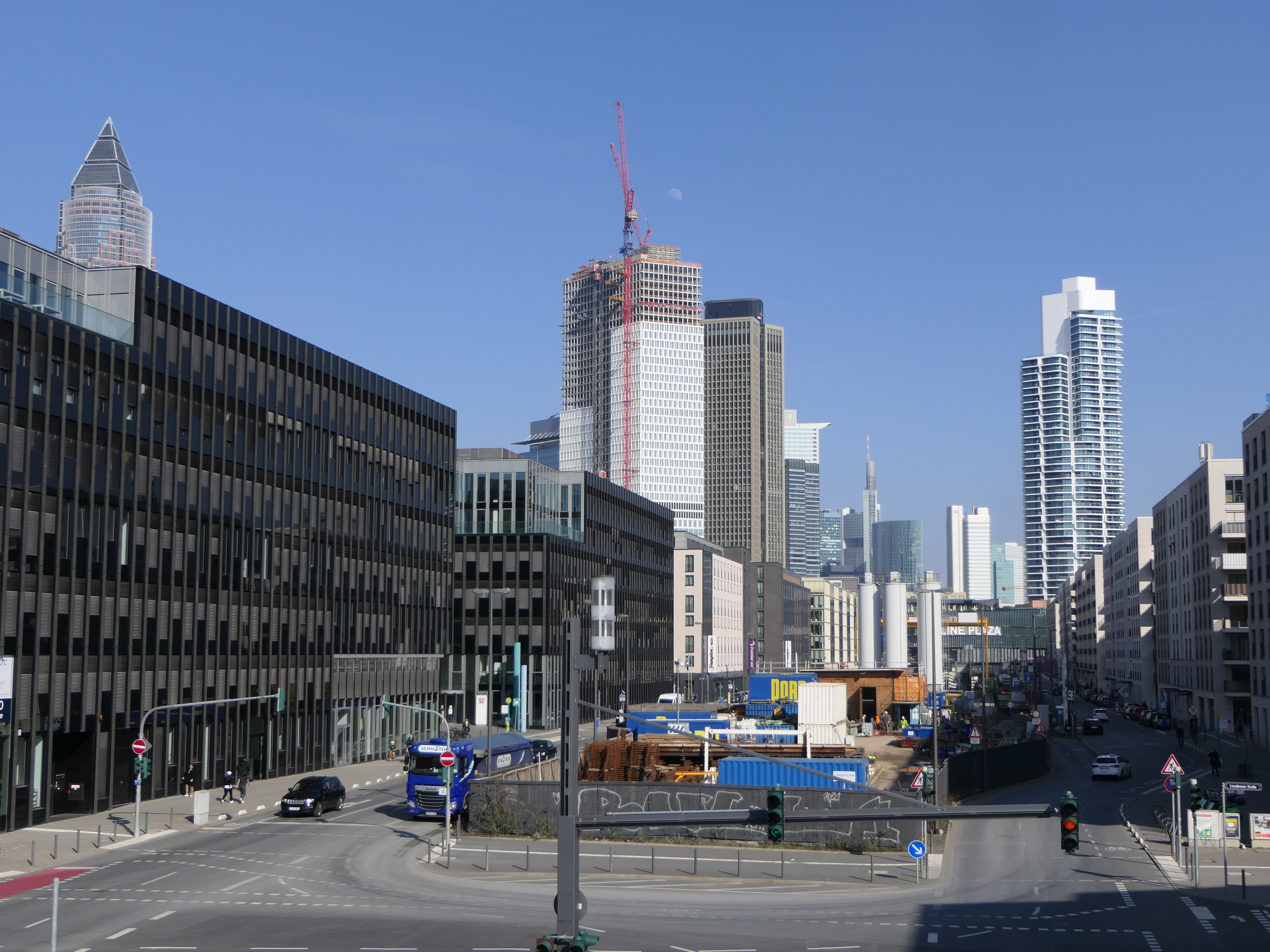
The tower under construction in March 2021...

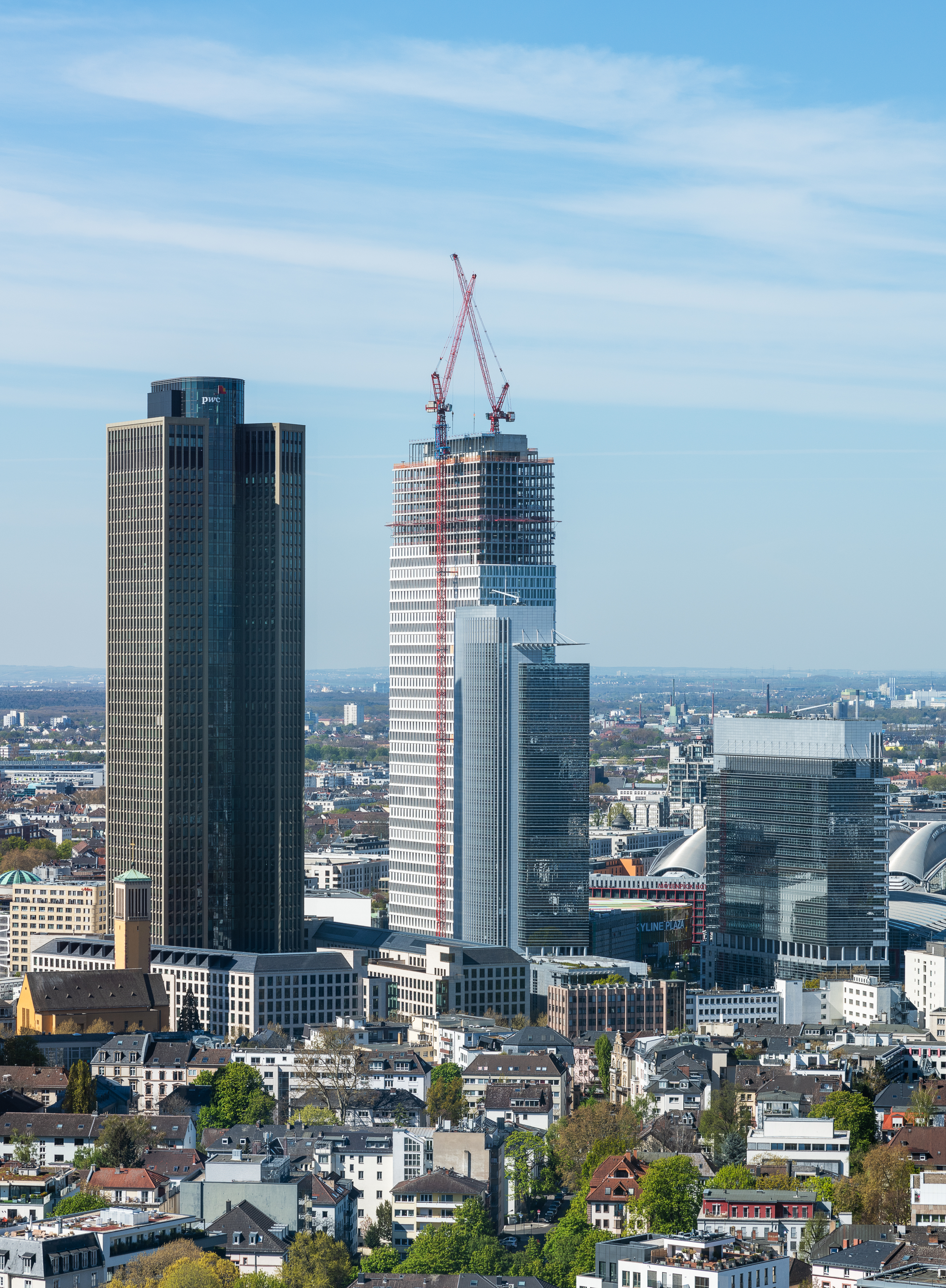
and in April 2021

== See also ==
- List of tallest buildings in Frankfurt
- List of tallest buildings in Germany
- List of tallest buildings in Europe
