= Leonardo Royal Hotel Frankfurt =

Skyscraper in Frankfurt, Germany

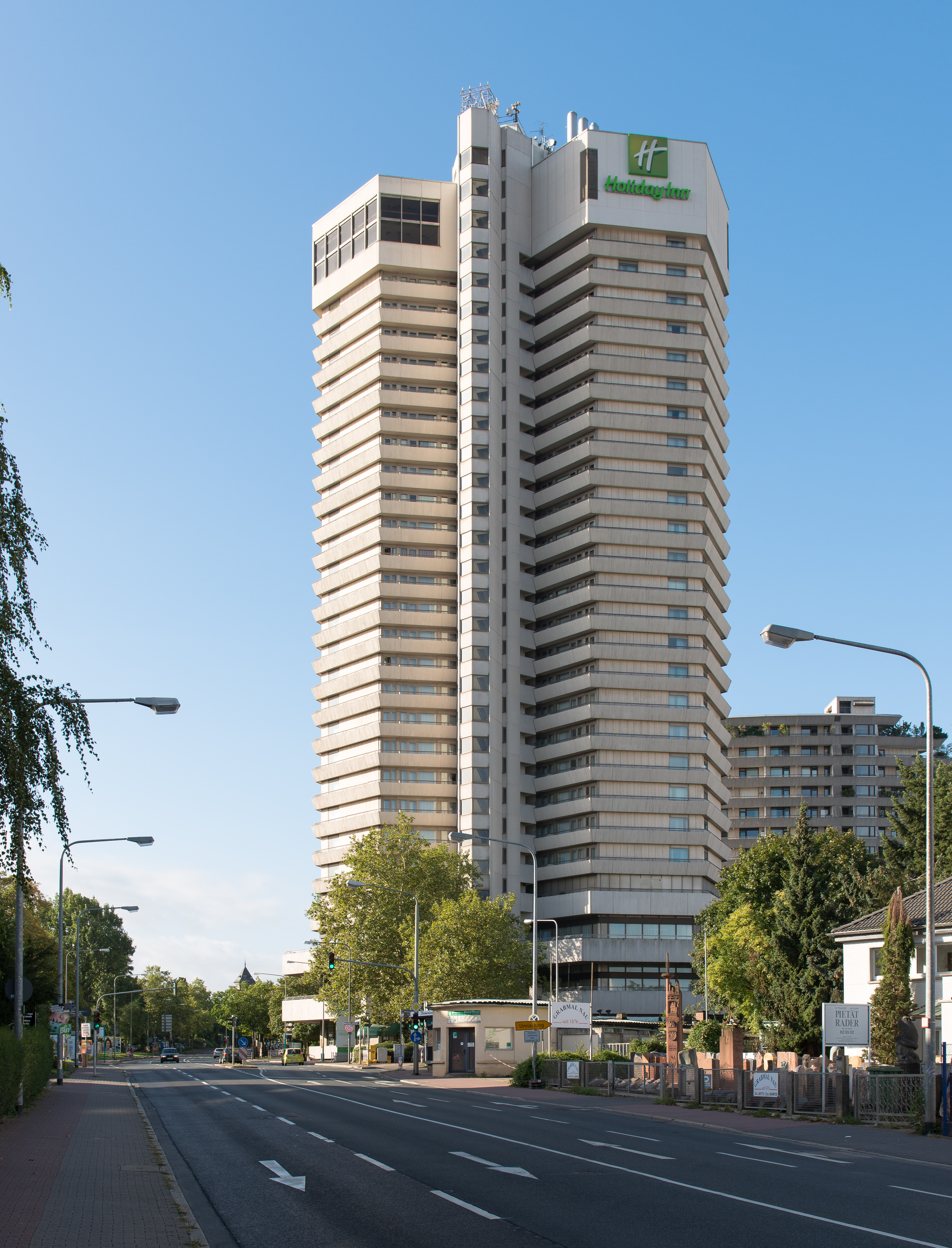
- Interactive map of the Leonardo Royal Hotel Frankfurt area

General information
- Status: Completed
- Type: Hotel
- Location: Frankfurt, Germany, 1 Mailänder Str., Frankfurt am Main, Germany
- Coordinates: 50.09151°N 8.69053°E
- Construction started: 1970
- Completed: 1972
- Owner: Leonardo Hotels

Height
- Roof: 100 m (330 ft)

Technical details
- Structural system: Concrete
- Floor count: 28

The Leonardo Royal Hotel Frankfurt also known as the Holiday Inn Frankfurt is a high-rise hotel in the Sachsenhausen district of Frankfurt, Germany. Built between 1970 and 1972, the building stands at 100 m (330 ft) with 28 floors and is the current 42nd tallest building in Frankfurt.

== History ==
The hotel is located in the Sachsenhausen district and is currently operated by the German company Sunflower Management GmbH & Co. KG, which is a subsidiary of the Fattal Hotel Group and owns the German trademark word of "Leonardo". With a height of 100 metres, the building, which opened in 1972, is the second tallest structure in Sachsenhausen after the Henninger Tower, which was newly built in 2014. The former "Holiday Inn Frankfurt City-South Conference Centre" was sold to Leonardo Hotels in 2014 and renamed Leonardo Royal Hotel Frankfurt. The building houses a total of 449 rentable rooms, 20 meeting rooms, a fitness center and a pool.

== See also ==
- List of tallest buildings in Frankfurt
- List of tallest buildings in Germany
