= Frankfurter Büro Center =

Skyscraper in Frankfurt, Germany

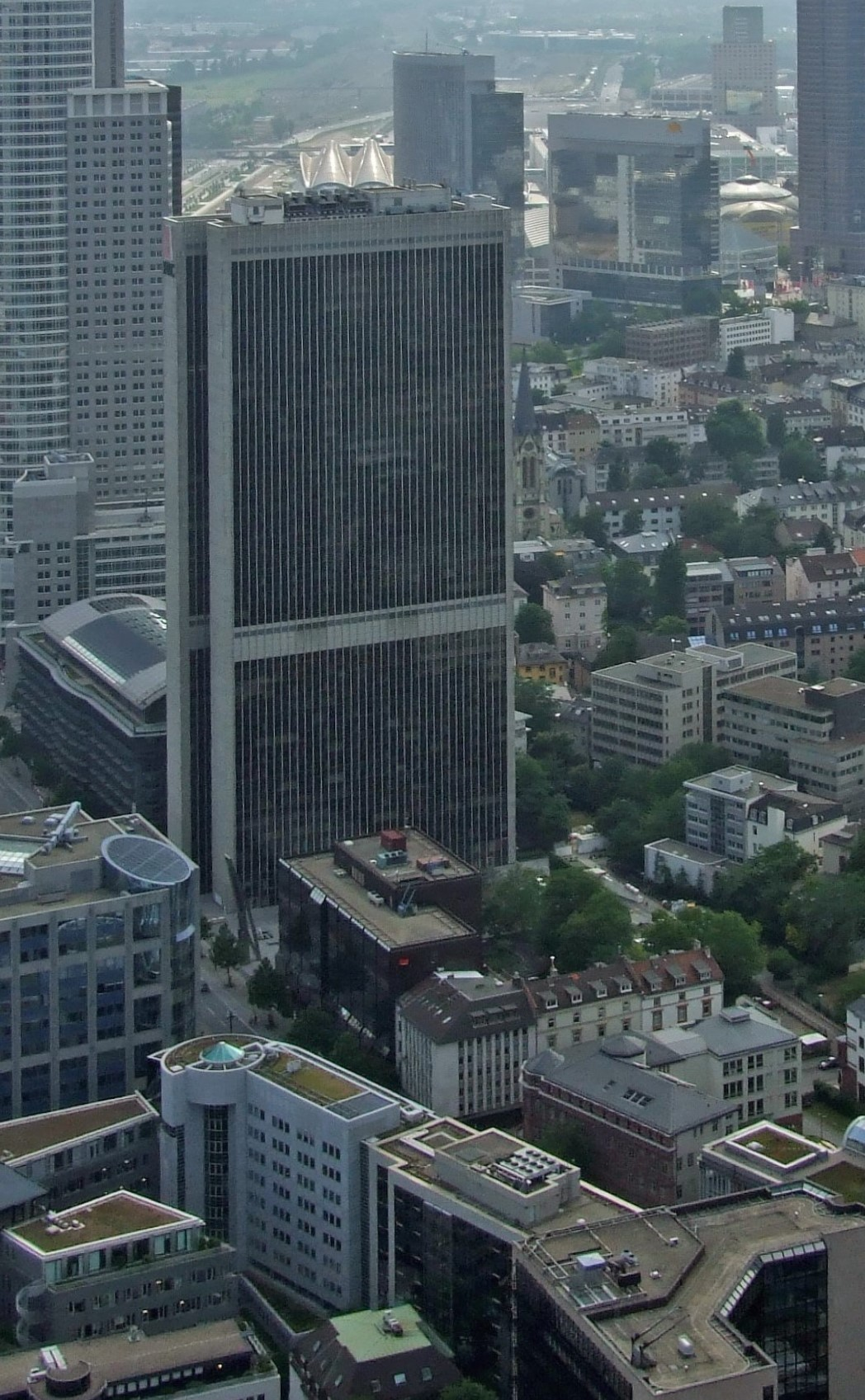

General information
- Type: Commercial offices
- Architectural style: Modernism
- Location: Mainzer Landstraße 40–46; Frankfurt; Hesse, Germany
- Coordinates: 50°06′41″N 8°39′52″E
- Completed: 1974–1980

Height
- Roof: 142 m (466 ft)

Technical details
- Floor count: 40; 2 below ground
- Floor area: 52,000 m^{2} (560,000 sq ft)

Design and construction
- Architect: Richard Heil
- Engineer: BGS Ingenieursozietät
- Main contractor: Philipp Holzmann AG

Frankfurter Büro Center (German for Frankfurt Office Centre), also known as FBC, is a 40-storey, 142 m (466 ft) skyscraper in the Westend-Süd district of Frankfurt, Germany. It was designed by architect Richard Heil from Frankfurt. The building's anchor tenant is the international law firm Clifford Chance.

== Background ==
Due to the oil crisis the construction of the skyscraper got stuck in 1975. Until 1979 no investor had been found to finish the building because of high construction costs and a lack of prospective tenants for the office space. Later the ECE project development company stepped in and reached an agreement with owners and artisans, and developed a construction program for completion and technical improvement as well as a rental concept. In 1981 the tower was finally finished and comprised approximately 52,000 m^{2} (560,000 sq ft) of gross floor area. As of end of April 2007 approximately 17,000 m^{2} (180,000 sq ft) of office space on the lower 20 floors were not let. Thus, the occupancy rate was approximately 65 percent.

The building was owned by DEGI, an open property fund of Dresdner Bank from 1985 to 2007 and then sold to the Goldman Sachs Whitehall Fund. In 2016 it was acquired by PBM Germany, a construction company from Berlin.

Frankfurter Büro Center

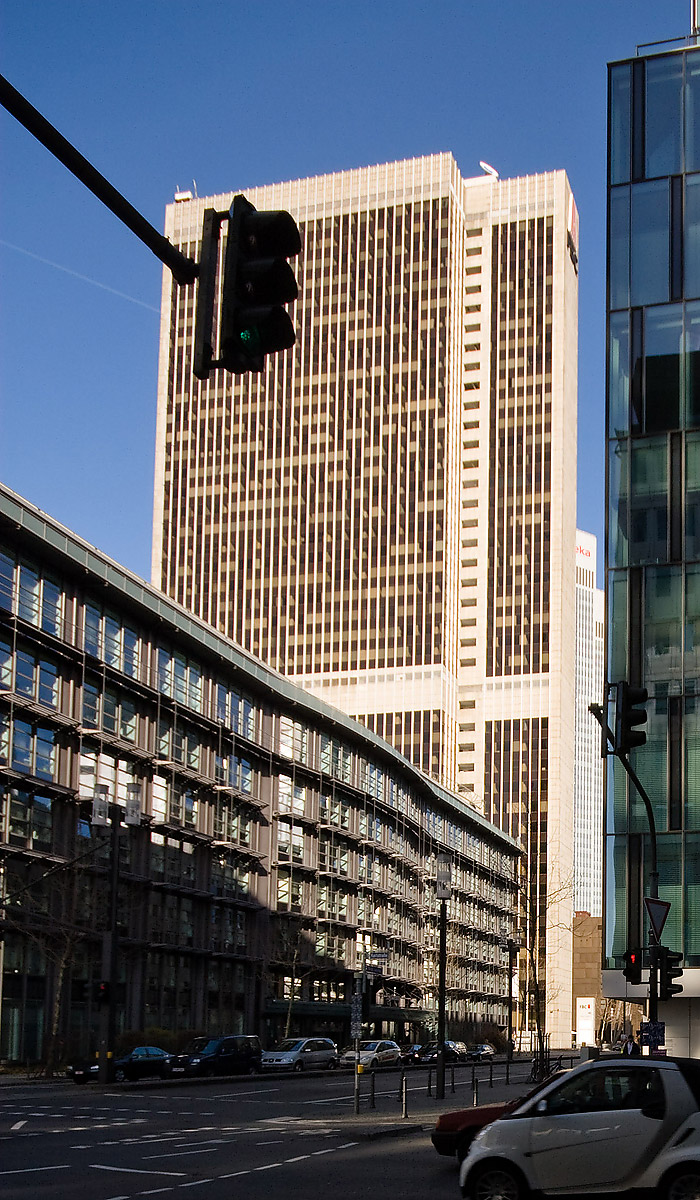

== See also ==
- List of tallest buildings in Frankfurt
- List of tallest buildings in Germany
