= City Gate (Frankfurt) =

Skyscraper in Frankfurt, Germany

Büro Center Nibelungenplatz
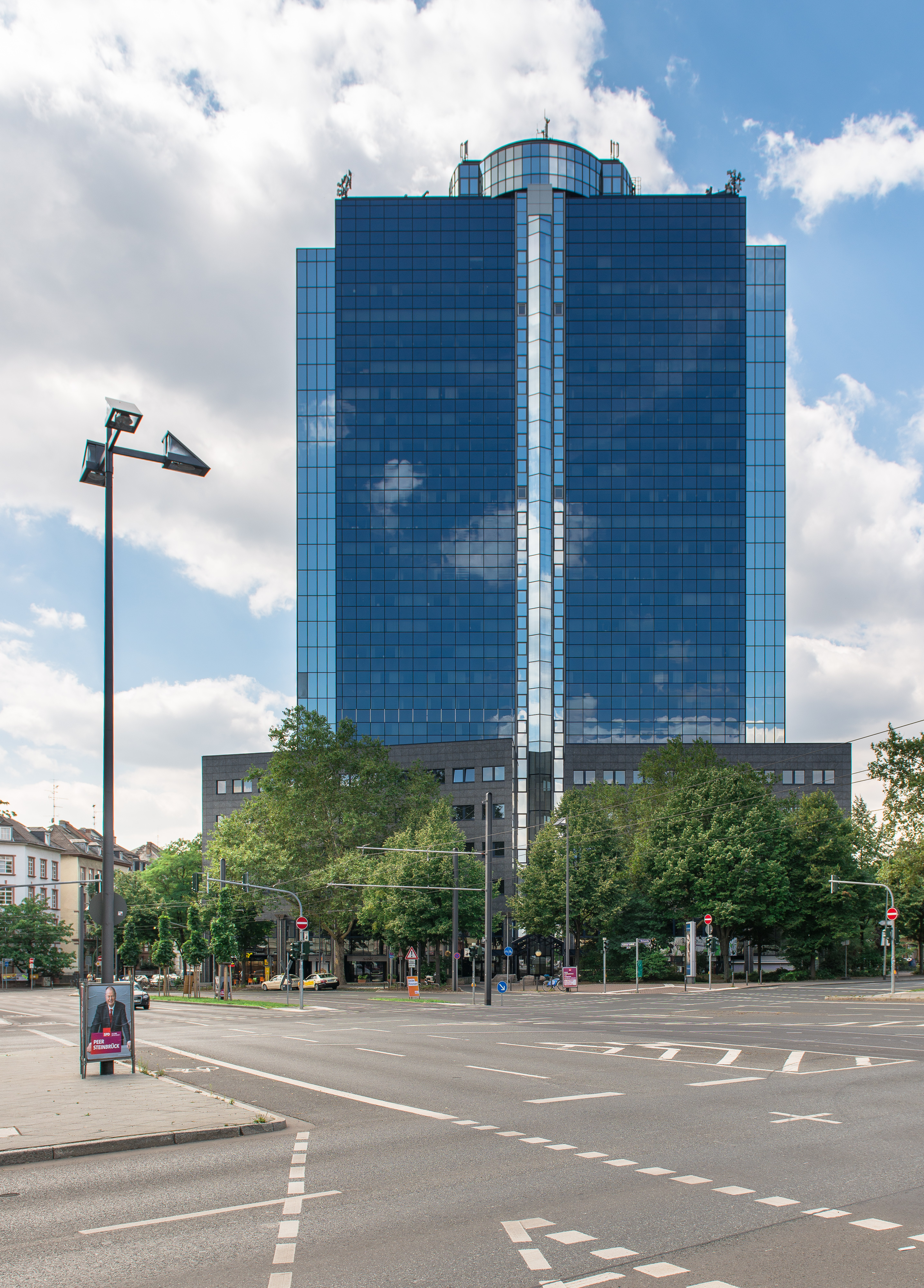
- Interactive map of the Büro Center Nibelungenplatz area
- Former names: Shell Tower

General information
- Type: Commercial offices
- Architectural style: Modernism
- Location: Nibelungenplatz 3 Frankfurt; Hesse, Germany
- Coordinates: 50.1286°N 8.69167°E
- Construction started: 1964
- Completed: 1966

Height
- Roof: 110 m (360 ft)

Technical details
- Floor count: 27
- Floor area: 32,000 m^{2} (340,000 sq ft)

Design and construction
- Architects: Fritz Meinel; Günther Rheingaus; Novotny Mähner Assoziierte

City Gate, formerly Büro Center Nibelungenplatz (known as BCN) and Shell Tower, is a 27-storey, 110 m (360 ft) skyscraper in the Nordend-West district of Frankfurt, Germany. The building was constructed in 1966. It was one of Frankfurt's first buildings to reach over 50 m (160 ft), and it remains the tallest building in the Nordend district. It is located at Nibelungenplatz, a busy junction in the Nordend.

== History ==
=== Construction ===
Büro Center Nibelungenplatz was designed by Novotny Mähner Assoziierte and part of the entire northern Alleenring comprehensive development plan, which provided for conversion to freeway and spot high-rises at all major intersections. The plan was however not followed up at another building at the intersection with the highway Eschersheimer further. The skyscraper at Nibelungenplatz was built from 1964 to 1966 for the oil companies Shell and was then the first skyscraper in Frankfurt to reach 100 m (330 ft). In the cellar a fallout shelter was included, later used as a garage.

=== Reconstruction ===
The original facade followed the international style, made up of suspended aluminum plates, no longer exists. In 1993 the tower was renovated by Novotny Mähner Assoziierte, by cladding it in glass and equipping it with a panoramic lift.

== Tenants ==
The tower is headquarters of the General Consulate of the Kingdom of Spain. Other tenants include the Frankfurt University of Applied Sciences, Merz Pharma, M. Page, Financial Times Europe, SCF, mediomind, REWE and a Subway restaurant.

City Gate was until 2013 a permanent shooting location for the ZDF television series Ein Fall für zwei (A Case for Two), because the lawyer's fictional law firm was sited in that building.

== See also ==
- List of tallest buildings in Frankfurt
- List of tallest buildings in Germany
