= List of tallest buildings by German federal state =

The following is a list of the tallest high-rise buildings by German federal state, based on standard height measurement. This includes spires and architectural details but does not include antenna masts. Not included are town halls like New Town Hall (Leipzig), Hamburg City Hall, Kiel Town Hall, New Town Hall (Dresden) or New Town Hall (Hanover) as well as non-habitable buildings like radio masts and towers, observation towers, steeples, chimneys, and other tall architectural structures.

By far the most high-rise buildings with a height of at least 100 meters are located in Hesse (45), followed by North Rhine-Westphalia (18), Berlin (14), Bavaria (8) and thirteen in other federal states.

Hesse is also the federal state whose largest city, Frankfurt, is the only real skyscraper city in Germany. Out of a total of 22 skyscrapers in Germany, meaning buildings at least 150 metres (492 ft) tall, 20 are located in Frankfurt. Six of them are 200 m (660 ft) or higher.

== Current tallest building in each federal state ==
State	City	Name of Building	Image	Height		Floors	Year (Note: Year completed)	Primary purpose	Previous tallest
State	City	Name of Building	Image	(m)	(ft)	Floors	Year	Primary purpose	Previous tallest
Hesse	Frankfurt (Main)	Commerzbank Tower		259	850	56	1997	Office	Messeturm (1990), 257 metres (843 ft)
Berlin	Berlin	Estrel Tower		176	577	45	2025	Hotel	Edge East Side Tower (2023), 142 metres (466 ft)
North Rhine-Westphalia	Bonn	Post Tower		162.5	533	41	2002	Office	KölnTurm (2001), 148.5 metres (487 ft)
Bremen	Bremerhaven	Atlantic Hotel Sail City		147	482	23	2008	Hotel	Columbus-Center I (1978), 88 metres (289 ft)
Bavaria	Munich	Hochhaus Uptown München		146	479	38	2004	Office	Business Tower Nürnberg (2000), 135 metres (443 ft)
Thuringia	Jena	JenTower (Intershop Tower)		144.5	474	32	1972	Office	Bau 59 (1965), 67 metres (220 ft)
Saxony	Leipzig	City-Hochhaus Leipzig		142.5	468	36	1972	Office	Europahaus (1929), 56 metres (184 ft)
Schleswig-Holstein	Travemünde (Lübeck)	Maritim Travemünde		119	391	35	1974	Hotel	Wikingturm (1973), ~90 metres (295 ft)
Hamburg	Hamburg	Elbphilharmonie		110	361	26	2017	Concert hall, Hotel	Radisson Blu Hotel Hamburg (1973), 108 metres (354 ft)
Baden-Württemberg	Mannheim	Collini Center		102	335	32	1975	Residential	
Rhineland-Palatinate	Mainz	Bonifazius-Türme		95	312	24	1977	Office	Friedrich-Engelhorn-Hochhaus (1957), 101.6 metres (333 ft) (demolished)
Lower Saxony	Hanover	Stadtwerke Hochhaus		92	302	23	1975	Office	Lister Tor (1975), 91 metres (299 ft)
Brandenburg	Frankfurt (Oder)	Oderturm		89	292	25	1976	Office	Mercure Potsdam (1969), 60 metres (197 ft)
Mecklenburg-Vorpommern	Rostock	August-Bebel-Straße 36		77	253	24	1970s	Residential	
Saxony-Anhalt	Halle (Saale)	Am Bruchsee 10		73	240	24	1970s	Residential	
Saarland	Saarlouis	Ford-Hochhaus		65	213	23	1968	Residential	

== Tallest buildings proposed or under construction ==
These future buildings, if completed, would overtake the title of the tallest building in their respective states.

State	City	Name of building	Image	Height		Floors	Year (Note: Estimated year of completion)	Primary purpose	Status
State	City	Name of building	Image	(m)	(ft)	Floors	Year	Primary purpose	Status
Hesse	Frankfurt (Main)	Millennium Tower (Frankfurt)		288	945	70	2030	Mixed-use	Approved
Hamburg	Hamburg	Elbtower		199	653	52	Unknown	Mixed-use	On hold
Berlin	Berlin	Estrel Tower		176	577	45	2025	Hotel	Topped Out
Bavaria	Munich	Paketposthalle Towers		155	509	39	Unknown	Mixed-use	Proposed
Baden-Württemberg	Fellbach	Schwabenlandtower		107	351	34	Unknown	Residential	On hold
Saxony-Anhalt	Halle (Saale)	Hochhaus am Riebeckplatz		85	279	23	2028	Hotel, Office	Approved
Mecklenburg-Vorpommern	Rostock	City-Tower		80	263	18	2029	Residential	Approved
Saarland	Saarbrücken	Am Schanzenberg		70	230	16	Unknown	Office	Proposed

== Lists of the tallest buildings by state ==
=== Baden-Württemberg (≥70 m) ===
- Collini Center, Mannheim, 102 metres (335 ft)
- Neckaruferbebauung Nord, Mannheim, 3 x 101 metres (331 ft)
- Victoria Turm, Mannheim, 97 metres (318 ft)
- Porsche Design Tower, Stuttgart, 90 metres (295 ft)
- Geraer Ring 10, Mannheim, 86 metres (282 ft)
- Freiberger Ring 3, Mannheim, 83 metres (272 ft)
- Geraer Ring 2, Mannheim, 83 metres (272 ft)
- Universum Center, Ulm, 82 metres (269 ft)
- LBBW-Hochhaus, Stuttgart, 79 metres (259 ft)
- Landesversicherungsanstalt Baden-Württemberg, Karlsruhe, 77 metres (253 ft)
- Skyline Living, Stuttgart, 75 metres (246 ft)
- Millennium Hotel & Resort, Stuttgart, 75 metres (246 ft)
- Sparkasse Pforzheim, Pforzheim, 75 metres (246 ft)
- Colorado, Stuttgart, 73 metres (240 ft)
- Wüstenrot Tower, Ludwigsburg, 72 metres (236 ft)
- Lörracher Rathaus, 71.8 metres (236 ft)
- Landratsamt, Karlsruhe, 70 metres (230 ft)
- TDS Office Tower, Neckarsulm, 70 metres (230 ft)
- Sky-Hochhaus, Bietigheim-Bissingen, 70 metres (230 ft)
- STEP Debitel-City, Stuttgart, 70 metres (230 ft)

=== Bavaria (≥70 m) ===
- Hochhaus Uptown München, Munich, 146 metres (479 ft)
- Business Tower Nürnberg, Nuremberg, 135 metres (443 ft)
- Highlight I, Munich, 126 metres (413 ft)
- Dorint Hotel Tower, Augsburg, 115 metres (377 ft)
- Hypo-Haus, Munich, 114 metres (374 ft)
- Highlight II, Munich, 113 metres (371 ft)
- SV-Hochhaus, Munich, 103 metres (338 ft)
- BMW Headquarters, Munich, 101 metres (331 ft)
- ADAC Headquarters, Munich, 93 metres (305 ft)
- Olympia Tower, Munich, 88 metres (289 ft)
- Seniorenwohnen Westpark, Munich, 87 metres (285 ft)
- Werk4, Munich, 86 metres (282 ft)
- Münchner Tor, Munich, 85 metres (279 ft)
- Central Tower München, Munich, 85 metres (279 ft)
- Skyline Tower, Munich, 84 metres (276 ft)
- Sky Tower, Munich, 83 metres (272 ft)
- Riesstraße 82, Munich, 83 metres (272 ft)
- Langer Johann, Erlangen, 80 metres (262 ft)
- Norikus, Nuremberg, 80 metres (262 ft)
- Helene-Mayer-Ring 10, Munich, 76 metres (249 ft)
- BayWa-Hochhaus, Munich, 76 metres (249 ft)
- Schwabencenter, Augsburg, 3 x 76 metres (249 ft)
- Siemens-Hochhaus, Munich, 75 metres (246 ft)
- Arabella Hochhaus, Munich, 75 metres (246 ft)
- Blaues Hochhaus, Schweinfurt, 73 metres (240 ft)
- Blue Tower, Munich, 72 metres (236 ft)
- MO82, Munich, 70 metres (230 ft)
- Behringstraße 23, Mainaschaff, 70 metres (230 ft)

=== Berlin (≥80 m) ===
- Estrel Tower, 176 metres (577 ft)
- The Berlinian, 146 metres (479 ft)
- Edge East Side Tower, 142 metres (466 ft)
- Park Inn Hotel, 125 metres (410 ft)
- Treptowers, 125 metres (410 ft)
- Steglitzer Kreisel, 120 metres (394 ft)
- Upper West, 119 metres (390 ft)
- Zoofenster, 119 metres (390 ft)
- Atrium Tower, 106 metres (348 ft)
- Bahntower, 103 metres (338 ft)
- Kollhoff-Tower, 103 metres (338 ft)
- Kudamm Karree, 102 metres (335 ft)
- Die Pyramide, 100 metres (328 ft)
- BfA-Hochhaus, 100 metres (328 ft)
- Stream Tower, 97.5 metres (320 ft)
- Upside Berlin (Max), 95 metres (312 ft)
- Internationales Handelszentrum, 93.5 metres (307 ft)
- Wohnhochhaus Ideal, 90 metres (295 ft)
- Postbank-Hochhaus, 89 metres (292 ft)
- Europa-Center, 86 metres (282 ft) (Total height: 103 metres (338 ft))
- Upside Berlin (Moritz), 86 metres (282 ft)
- Hochhaus am Europaplatz, 84 metres (276 ft)
- Zwickauer Damm 12, 84 metres (276 ft)
- Waldsassener Straße 29, 84 metres (276 ft)
- GSW-Hochhaus, 82 metres (269 ft)
- Upbeat Berlin, 82 metres (269 ft)
- Bettenhaus der Charité, 82 metres (269 ft)
- Telefunken-Hochhaus, 80 metres (262 ft)

=== Brandenburg (≥60 m) ===
- Oderturm, Frankfurt (Oder), 89 metres (292 ft)
- Residenz Heilig-Geist-Park, Potsdam, 84 metres (276 ft)
- Stern-Plaza, Potsdam, 73 metres (240 ft)
- Mercure Potsdam, Potsdam, 60 metres (197 ft)

=== Bremen (≥60 m) ===
- Atlantic Hotel Sail City, Bremerhaven, 147 metres (482 ft)
- Columbus-Center I, Bremerhaven, 88 metres (289 ft)
- Weser Tower, Bremen, 82 metres (269 ft)
- Zech Haus, Bremen, 82 metres (269 ft)
- Columbus-Center II, Bremerhaven, 78 metres (256 ft)
- Almatastraße 29, Bremen, 69 metres (226 ft)
- Landmark-Tower, Bremen, 67 metres (220 ft)
- Aalto-Hochhaus, Bremen, 65 metres (213 ft)
- Neuwieder Straße 23, Bremen, 62 metres (203 ft)
- Siemens-Hochhaus, Bremen, 61 metres (200 ft)
- Bundeswehrhochhaus, Bremen, 60 metres (197 ft)
- Columbus-Center III, Bremerhaven, 58 metres (190 ft)

=== Hamburg (≥70 m) ===
- Elbphilharmonie, 110 metres (361 ft)
- Radisson Blu Hotel Hamburg, 108 metres (354 ft)
- Hanseatic Trade Center, 105 metres (344 ft)
- Mundsburg Tower I, 101 metres (331 ft)
- Emporio, 98 metres (322 ft)
- Mundsburg Tower III, 97 metres (318 ft)
- Mundsburg Turm II, 90 metres (295 ft)
- Berliner Tor Center I, 90 metres (295 ft)
- Berliner Tor Center II, 90 metres (295 ft)
- Atlantic-Haus, 88 metres (289 ft)
- Geomatikum, 85 metres (279 ft)
- Dancing Towers, 85 metres (279 ft)
- Berliner Tor Center III, 83 metres (272 ft)
- Kaiserhof, 78 metres (256 ft)
- Jessenstraße 4, 75 metres (246 ft)
- Palmaille 35, 75 metres (246 ft)
- Holiday Inn Hotel, 75 metres (246 ft)
- Channel Tower, 75 metres (246 ft)
- Motel One (Alster), 74 metres (243 ft)
- Empire Riverside Hotel, 73 metres (240 ft)
- Gorch-Fock-Haus, 72 metres (236 ft)
- Kristall Tower, 72 metres (236 ft)
- Astra-Turm (DWI-Turm), 70 metres (230 ft)
- Watermark, 70 metres (230 ft)

=== Hesse (≥80 m) ===
- Commerzbank Tower, Frankfurt, 259 metres (850 ft)
- Messeturm, Frankfurt, 257 metres (843 ft)
- Four I, Frankfurt, 233 metres (764 ft)
- Westend Tower, Frankfurt, 208 metres (682 ft)
- Main Tower, Frankfurt, 200 metres (656 ft)
- Tower 185, Frankfurt, 200 metres (656 ft)
- One Frankfurt, Frankfurt, 191 metres (627 ft)
- Omniturm, Frankfurt, 190 metres (623 ft)
- Trianon, Frankfurt, 186 metres (610 ft)
- European Central Bank, Frankfurt, 185 metres (607 ft)
- Grand Tower, Frankfurt, 180 metres (591 ft)
- Four II, Frankfurt, 179 metres (587 ft)
- Opernturm, Frankfurt, 170 metres (558 ft)
- Taunusturm, Frankfurt, 170 metres (558 ft)
- Silberturm, Frankfurt, 166 metres (545 ft)
- Westend Gate, Frankfurt, 159 metres (522 ft)
- Deutsche Bank Twin Towers, Frankfurt, 2 x 155 metres (509 ft)
- Marienturm, Frankfurt, 155 metres (509 ft)
- Skyper, Frankfurt, 154 metres (505 ft)
- Eurotower, Frankfurt, 148 metres (486 ft)
- One Forty West, Frankfurt, 145 metres (476 ft)
- Frankfurter Büro Center, Frankfurt, 142 metres (466 ft)
- City-Haus, Frankfurt, 142 metres (466 ft)
- Neuer Henninger-Turm, Frankfurt, 140 metres (459 ft)
- Gallileo, Frankfurt, 136 metres (446 ft)
- Nextower, Frankfurt, 136 metres (446 ft)
- Pollux, Frankfurt, 130 metres (427 ft)
- The Spin, Frankfurt, 128 metres (420 ft)
- Four III, Frankfurt, 128 metres (420 ft)
- Garden Tower, Frankfurt, 127 metres (417 ft)
- Sparda-Bank Tower, Frankfurt, 123.1 metres (404 ft)
- City-Tower, Offenbach, 120 metres (394 ft)
- Messe Torhaus, Frankfurt, 117 metres (384 ft)
- Japan Center, Frankfurt, 115 metres (377 ft)
- Park Tower, Frankfurt, 115 metres (377 ft)
- Westhafen Tower, Frankfurt, 112 metres (367 ft)
- IBC Tower, Frankfurt, 112 metres (367 ft)
- City Gate (Frankfurt), Frankfurt, 110 metres (361 ft)
- Eurotheum, Frankfurt, 110 metres (361 ft)
- WinX Tower, Frankfurt, 110 metres (361 ft)
- Global Tower, Frankfurt, 109 metres (358 ft)
- Senckenberg Turm, Frankfurt, 106 metres (348 ft)
- Four IV, Frankfurt, 105 metres (344 ft)
- Leonardo Royal Hotel Frankfurt, Frankfurt, 100 metres (328 ft)
- JW Marriott Frankfurt, Frankfurt, 99 metres (325 ft)
- Eden, Frankfurt, 98 metres (322 ft)
- Arabella Center, Frankfurt, 96 metres (315 ft)
- 160 Park View, Frankfurt, 96 metres (315 ft)
- WestendDuo, Frankfurt, 96 metres (315 ft)
- Radisson Blu Hotel, Frankfurt, 96 metres (315 ft)
- Kastor, Frankfurt, 95 metres (312 ft)
- Hafenstraße 51, Frankfurt, 93 metres (305 ft)
- Union Investment-Hochhaus, Frankfurt, 93 metres (305 ft)
- Bürohaus an der Alten Oper, Frankfurt, 89 metres (292 ft)
- Technisches Zentrum Eschborn, Eschborn 89 metres (292 ft)
- Main Plaza, Frankfurt, 88 metres (289 ft)
- Horizon Tower, Eschborn, 88 metres (289 ft)
- Deutsche Börse Cube, Eschborn, 87.4 metres (287 ft)
- Ventura, Eschborn, 87 metres (285 ft)
- Alpha-Hochhaus, Langen, 87 metres (285 ft)
- Rhein-Main-Center, Frankfurt, 84 metres (276 ft)
- BHF-Bank-Hochhaus, Frankfurt, 82 metres (269 ft)
- Main Forum, Frankfurt, 80 metres (262 ft)
- Campus Tower, Frankfurt, 80 metres (262 ft)

=== Lower Saxony (≥60 m) ===
- Hochhaus der Stadtwerke, Hanover, 92 metres (302 ft)
- Hochhaus Lister Tor, Hanover, 91 metres (299 ft)
- Business Center I (Posthochhaus), Braunschweig, 90 metres (295 ft)
- Verwaltungsgebäude der Nord/LB, Hanover, 83.5 metres (274 ft)
- Verwaltungsgebäude Nord Deutsche Messe, Hanover, 82 metres (269 ft)
- Business Center II (BraWo-Hochhaus), Braunschweig, 80 metres (262 ft)
- Osterfelddamm 44, Hanover, 75 metres (246 ft)
- Ihmepassage 2, Hanover, 73 metres (240 ft)
- Sparkasse Hannover, Hanover, 69.5 metres (228 ft)
- Hochhaus Appelstraße, Hanover, 69 metres (226 ft)
- Ihmeplatz 1, Hanover, 68 metres (223 ft)
- Business Center III, Braunschweig, 68 metres (223 ft)
- Braunschweigischen Landessparkasse, Braunschweig, 68 metres (223 ft)
- Allianz-Hochhaus, Hanover, 67.5 metres (221 ft)
- Elmstraße 17, Hanover, 67 metres (220 ft)
- Hochhaus am Schwarzen Berge, Braunschweig, 66 metres (217 ft)
- Continental-Hochhaus Hanover, 65 metres (213 ft)
- Iduna-Hochhaus, Osnabrück, 65 metres (213 ft)
- Helstorfer Straße 25, Hanover, 64 metres (210 ft)
- R+V Versicherung, Hanover, 64 metres (210 ft)
- Vahrenheider Markt 8, Hanover, 64 metres (210 ft)
- Markenhochhaus, 63 metres (207 ft), Wolfsburg
- Ring-Center, Braunschweig, 62 metres (203 ft)

=== Mecklenburg-Vorpommern (≥50 m) ===
- August-Bebel-Straße 36, Rostock, 77 metres (253 ft)
- Hotel Neptun, Warnemünde (Rostock), 64 metres (210 ft)
- Hochhaus Ahlbecker Straße 8, Rostock, 60 metres (197 ft)
- Haus der Kultur und Bildung, Neubrandenburg, 56 metres (184 ft)

=== North Rhine-Westphalia (≥80 m) ===
- Post Tower, Bonn, 162.5 metres (533 ft)
- Kölnturm, Cologne, 148.5 metres (487 ft)
- Colonia-Haus, Cologne, 147 metres (482 ft)
- Uni Center Köln, Cologne, 133 metres (436 ft)
- Westenergie-Turm, Essen, 127 metres (417 ft)
- ARAG Tower, Düsseldorf, 125 metres (410 ft)
- LVA Hauptgebäude, Düsseldorf, 123 metres (404 ft)
- UN-Hochhaus, Bonn, 115 metres (377 ft)
- TÜV-Rheinland Tower, Cologne, 112 metres (367 ft)
- Ringturm Cologne, Cologne, 109 metres (358 ft)
- Victoria Haus, Düsseldorf, 108 metres (354 ft)
- Essen City Hall, Essen, 106 metres (348 ft)
- Land- und Amtsgericht Köln, Cologne, 105 metres (344 ft)
- Kölntriangle, Cologne, 103 metres (338 ft)
- Herkules Hochhaus, Cologne, 102 metres (335 ft)
- Deutschlandradio-Turm, Cologne, 102 metres (335 ft)
- Neuer Kanzlerplatz, Bonn, 101.5 metres (333 ft)
- RellingHaus II, Essen, 100 metres (328 ft)
- Telekom Hochhaus, Cologne, 99 metres (325 ft)
- Rheinsternhaus, Cologne, 96 metres (315 ft)
- Lanxess Tower, Cologne, 95 metres (312 ft)
- Dreischeibenhaus, Düsseldorf, 94 metres (308 ft)
- An der Fuhr 4, Cologne, 93 metres (305 ft)
- Postbank-Hochhaus, Essen, 92 metres (302 ft)
- RWE Tower, Dortmund, 91 metres (299 ft)
- GAP 15, Düsseldorf, 90 metres (295 ft)
- H1-Hochhaus, Bielefeld, 90 metres (295 ft)
- Bettenhaus Universitätsklinikum, Cologne, 89 metres (292 ft)
- Exzenterhaus, Bochum, 89 metres (292 ft)
- Sky Office, Düsseldorf, 89 metres (292 ft)
- Mannesmann-Hochhaus, Düsseldorf, 88.5 metres (290 ft)
- Telekom-Hochhaus Dortmund, Dortmund, 88 metres (289 ft)
- Westfalentower, Dortmund, 86 metres (282 ft)
- Hochhaus Kruppstraße 5, Essen, 85 metres (279 ft)
- DKV-Versicherungen, Cologne, 84 metres (276 ft)

=== Rhineland-Palatinate (≥60 m) ===
- Bonifazius Türme, Mainz, 2 x 95 metres (312 ft)
- Hemshof-Center, Ludwigshafen, 88 metres (289 ft)
- Kaiserslautern Town Hall, Kaiserslautern, 84 metres (276 ft)
- Debeka Hochhaus, Koblenz, 80 metres (262 ft)
- Yorckstr. 16, Ludwigshafen, 77 metres (253 ft)
- Opal Hotel, Idar-Oberstein, 75 metres (246 ft)
- Rathaus-Center, Ludwigshafen, 72 metres (236 ft)
- Zollhof-Hochhaus, Ludwigshafen, 70 metres (230 ft)
- Seniorenresidenz Humboldthöhe, Vallendar, 70 metres (230 ft)
- Mosch-Hochhaus, Ludwigshafen, 67 metres (220 ft)
- Excelsior-Hotel, Ludwigshafen, 65 metres (213 ft)
- Debeka-Erweiterungsbau, Koblenz, 60 metres (197 ft)
- Hochhäuser Froschlache, Ludwigshafen, 4 x 21 storeys
- Hochhäuser Mörikestraße, Ludwigshafen, 20 & 18 storeys

=== Saarland (≥50 m) ===
- Ford-Hochhaus, Saarlouis, 65 metres (213 ft)
- Königsbruch 9, Saarbrücken, 52 metres (171 ft)
- Hochhaus am Ring, Saarlouis, 17 fl

=== Saxony (≥50 m) ===
- City Hochhaus, Leipzig, 142.5 metres (468 ft)
- Congress Hotel Chemnitz, Chemnitz, 97 metres (318 ft)
- The Westin Leipzig, Leipzig, 96.8 metres (318 ft)
- Wintergartenhochhaus, Leipzig, 95.5 metres (313 ft) (Total height: 106.8 metres (350 ft))
- Hochhaus Löhrs Carré, Leipzig, 65 metres (213 ft)
- MDR-Hochhaus, Leipzig, 65 metres (213 ft)
- Center Torgauer Platz, Leipzig, 63 metres (207 ft)
- World Trade Center, Dresden, 58 metres (190 ft)
- Europahaus, Leipzig, 56 metres (184 ft)
- Magazinturm der Deutschen Bücherei, Leipzig, 55 metres (180 ft)
- Wohnhochhäuser Gret-Palucca-Straße 9 und 11, Dresden, 2 x 17 storeys
- SachsenEnergie-Hochhaus, Dresden, 51 metres (167 ft)
- WHH 17, Dresden, 16 x 17 storeys
- PH 16, Leipzig, 27 x 50.5 metres (166 ft)
- Hotel Pullman Dresden Newa, Dresden, 15 storeys

=== Saxony-Anhalt (≥50 m) ===
- Am Bruchsee 10, Halle (Saale), 73 metres (240 ft)
- Hochhaus Jakobstraße, Magdeburg, 65 metres (213 ft)
- Luisenturm, Magdeburg, 63 metres (207 ft)
- Punkthochhäuser PH20, Halle (Saale), 63 metres (207 ft)
- PH 16, Magdeburg, 14 x 50.5 metres (166 ft)

=== Schleswig-Holstein (≥60 m) ===
- Maritim Travemünde, Travemünde (Lübeck), 119 metres (390 ft)
- Maritim Clubhotel, Timmendorfer Strand, 101 metres (331 ft)
- Wikingturm, Schleswig, ~90 metres (295 ft)
- Weißer Riese, Kiel, 85 metres (279 ft)
- Hochhaus Büsum, Büsum, 85 metres (279 ft)
- Sachsenwald-Hochhaus, Reinbek, 65 metres (213 ft)

=== Thuringia (≥50 m) ===
- JenTower, Jena, 144.5 metres (474 ft)
- Bau 59, Jena, 67 metres (220 ft)
- Bau 36, Jena, 66 metres (217 ft)
- Universitätscampus Inselplatz, Jena, 65 metres (213 ft)
- Radisson Blu Hotel, Erfurt, 65 metres (213 ft)
- Hotel Panorama, Oberhof, 56 metres (184 ft)
- City Hotel, Suhl, 55 metres (180 ft) (Formerly 88 meters)
- Köstritzer Hochhaus, Gera, 17 storeys
- Wir Quartier, Erfurt, 53 metres (174 ft)
- PH 16, Erfurt & Gera, 13 & 1 x 50.5 metres (166 ft)

== See also ==
- List of tallest buildings in Germany
- List of tallest buildings in Berlin
- List of tallest buildings in Bochum
- List of tallest buildings in Bonn
- List of tallest buildings in Braunschweig
- List of tallest buildings in Bremen
- List of tallest buildings in Cologne
- List of tallest buildings in Dortmund
- List of tallest buildings in Düsseldorf
- List of tallest buildings in Essen
- List of tallest buildings in Frankfurt
- List of tallest buildings in Hamburg
- List of tallest buildings in Hanover
- List of tallest buildings in Jena
- List of tallest buildings in Leipzig
- List of tallest buildings in Mannheim
- List of tallest buildings in Munich
- List of tallest buildings in Nuremberg
- List of tallest buildings in Offenbach
- List of tallest buildings in Stuttgart
