= Barkow =

Barkow may refer to:

== People ==
- Al Barkow (born 1932), American journalist.
- Ben Barkow (born 1956), British librarian.
- Frank Barkow (born 1957), American architect.
- Jerome H. Barkow (1944–2024), Canadian anthropologist.
- Rachel Barkow (born 1971), American law professor.
- Sally Barkow (born 1980), American Olympic sailor.

== Places ==
- Mount Barkow, a mountain on the Antarctic.
- Barkow (Mecklenburg-Vorpommern), a sub-division of Barkhagen, Mecklenburg-Vorpommern, Germany
