= MainTor =

Skyscraper complex in Frankfurt, Germany

MainTor Complex
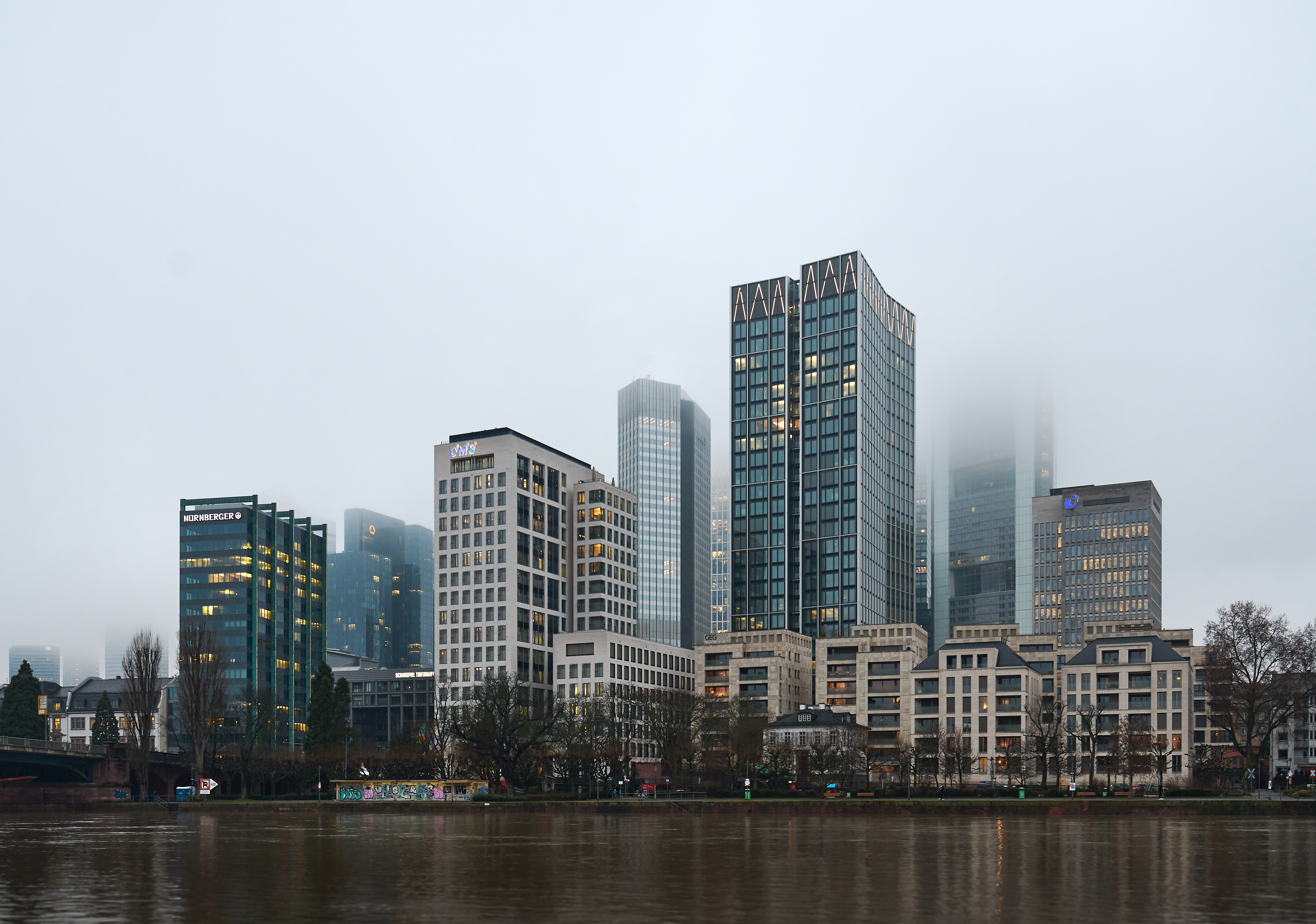
- Interactive map of the MainTor Complex area

General information
- Status: Completed
- Type: Mixed-use: Office / Retail
- Location: Frankfurt, Germany, 20 Neue Mainzer St., Frankfurt am Main, Germany
- Coordinates: 50.10910°N 8.67535°E
- Construction started: 2011
- Completed: 2017

Height
- Roof: 110 m (360 ft) (tallest (WinX)

Design and construction
- Architect: KSP Jürgen Engel Architekten

Website
- MainTor

MainTor Complex is a mixed-use high-rise building development in the Innenstadt district of Frankfurt, Germany. The complex consists of three main high-rise towers (WinX Tower, MainTor Porta and MainTor Panorama) combining a mix of offices, apartments, restaurants and commercial properties, with the tallest standing at 110 m (360 ft).

== History ==
=== Urban planning ===
Since 2012, several buildings have been constructed on the approximately 21,000 square meter former headquarters of Degussa, including three high-rise buildings, with a mix of offices, apartments, restaurants and commercial properties. The last new building in the building ensemble, the WINX office high-rise, has also been occupied. The project was awarded the MIPIM AR Future Projects Award in the category "Best German Project" on February 8, 2012, in Cannes. The area layes on the western edge of the old town in the transition to the Frankfurt's banking district. To the south lies the Untermainkai, to the west it borders on the Neue Mainzer Straße and the Untermainbrücke, and to the north on the Weißfrauenstraße. To the east of the area lies the Carmelite monastery.

The site served as the headquarters of the chemical company Degussa after the Second World War. In 1950, the first administrative building was moved into on Weißfrauenstrasse, and by the mid-1980s, further buildings had been erected on the exclusively commercially used site, including a 48-metre-high building (Degussa high-rise) on the corner of Neue Mainzer Strasse and Weißfrauenstrasse. The site was not accessible to the public.

After several mergers, Degussa's headquarters were moved to Düsseldorf in 2001 and the Frankfurt location lost importance. In 2005, the property known as the Degussa site in a central inner-city location was acquired by DIC Asset together with Morgan Stanley Real Estate Fund from Degussa AG. The architectural firm KSP Engel & Zimmermann was commissioned to develop an overall concept for the conversion of the property. Initially, it was planned that Degussa would continue to use individual buildings until 2015, but the lease was ultimately terminated on December 31, 2010.

The DIC presented the first concrete plans for the new development in March 2007. The basic idea behind the plans was to open the site to the public, create new routes between the old town and the banking district, and enable high-quality living on the Main. An 150-meter-high office tower was to be built in the middle of the site, and a 60-meter-high high-rise building on the south-west corner, together with the neighboring high-rise building of the Swiss National Insurance Company, would form a kind of gateway to the city center. Three residential buildings were planned to face the Main. Of the existing buildings, only the listed Hermann Schlosser House from 1823 on the Untermainkai and the Degussa high-rise were to be preserved. The building at Neue Mainzer Strasse 18, which is located on the site but has a different owner, was not included in the plans. The building, which was only completed in 2000, is home to the boulevard theater Die Komödie.

=== Concept ===
The plans met with mixed reactions from Frankfurt politicians. The height of the office tower was viewed particularly critically, as the site is in the old town. The Frankfurt SPD even demanded that the high-rise be abandoned, as it would reduce the chances of the 95-meter-high Frankfurt Cathedral to the east being recognized as a UNESCO World Heritage Site. In close consultation with the city, a compromise was reached in November 2007: the central high-rise can only be 100 meters high and will be moved from the middle of the site a little closer to the west to Neue Mainzer Strasse, while a third high-rise 60 meters high is planned on Weißfrauenstrasse. There will be around 250 high-quality residential units and space for around 3,000 jobs. The use of the available space will increase from 70,000 to around 100,000 m^{2} of gross floor space. It was welcomed that the area will once again have a public passage from Weißfrauenstraße to the banks of the Main, as it existed before Degussa used it. The planned investment sum is around 580 million euros.

In May 2010, the development plan (No. 867) for the property came into force. This makes it possible to apply for building permits for the individual buildings. At the beginning of 2011, the last Degussa employees moved out of the existing buildings. Demolition of the buildings began in August 2011, but work dragged on until late summer 2012 due to the sensitive environment. The first construction phase, which includes the demolition work and the revitalization of the old Degussa high-rise, is expected to cost 50 million euros.

== Architecture ==
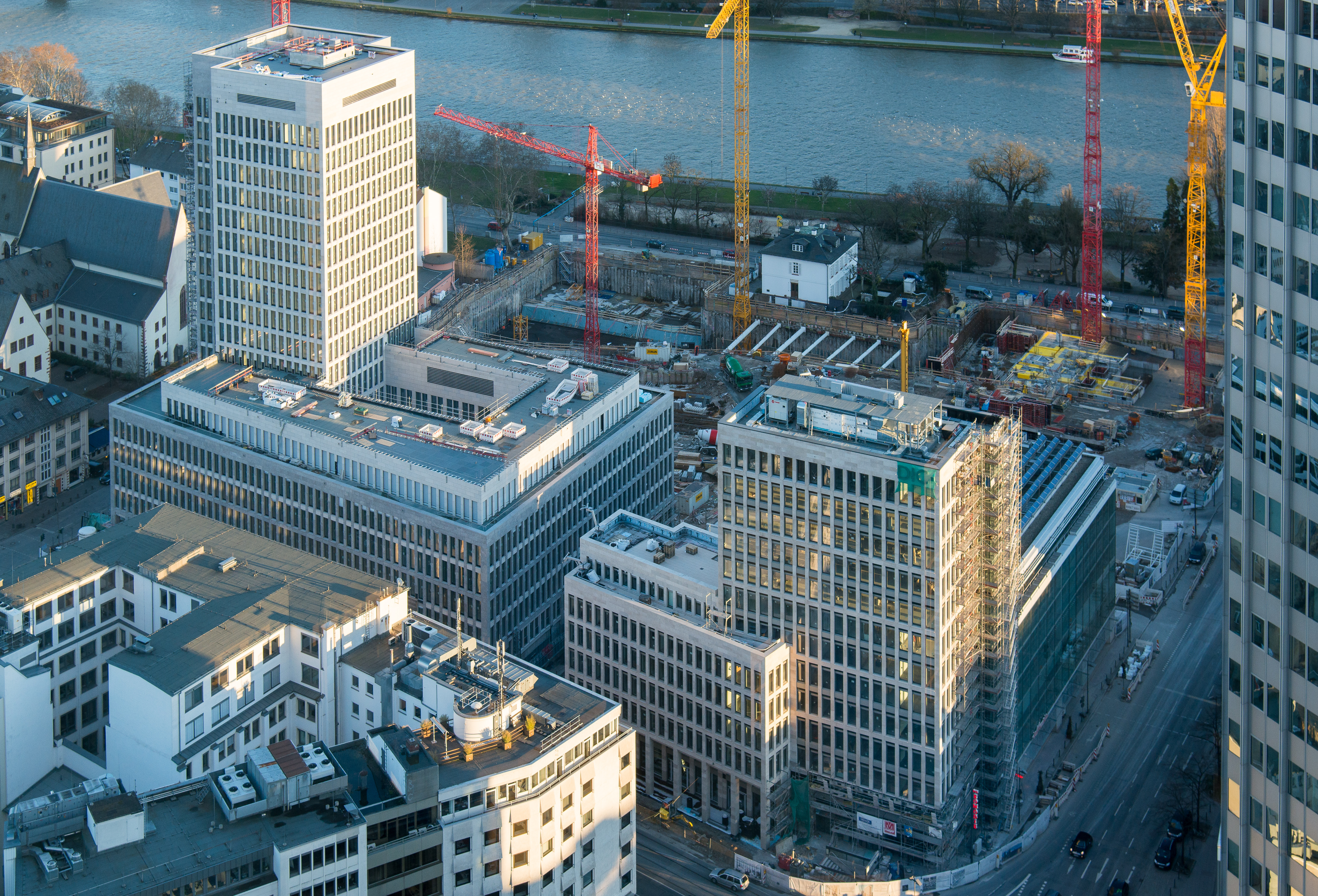
MainTor area with Porta and Primus ("DIC") in the foreground. The WINX tower is being built in the middle. (February 2014)

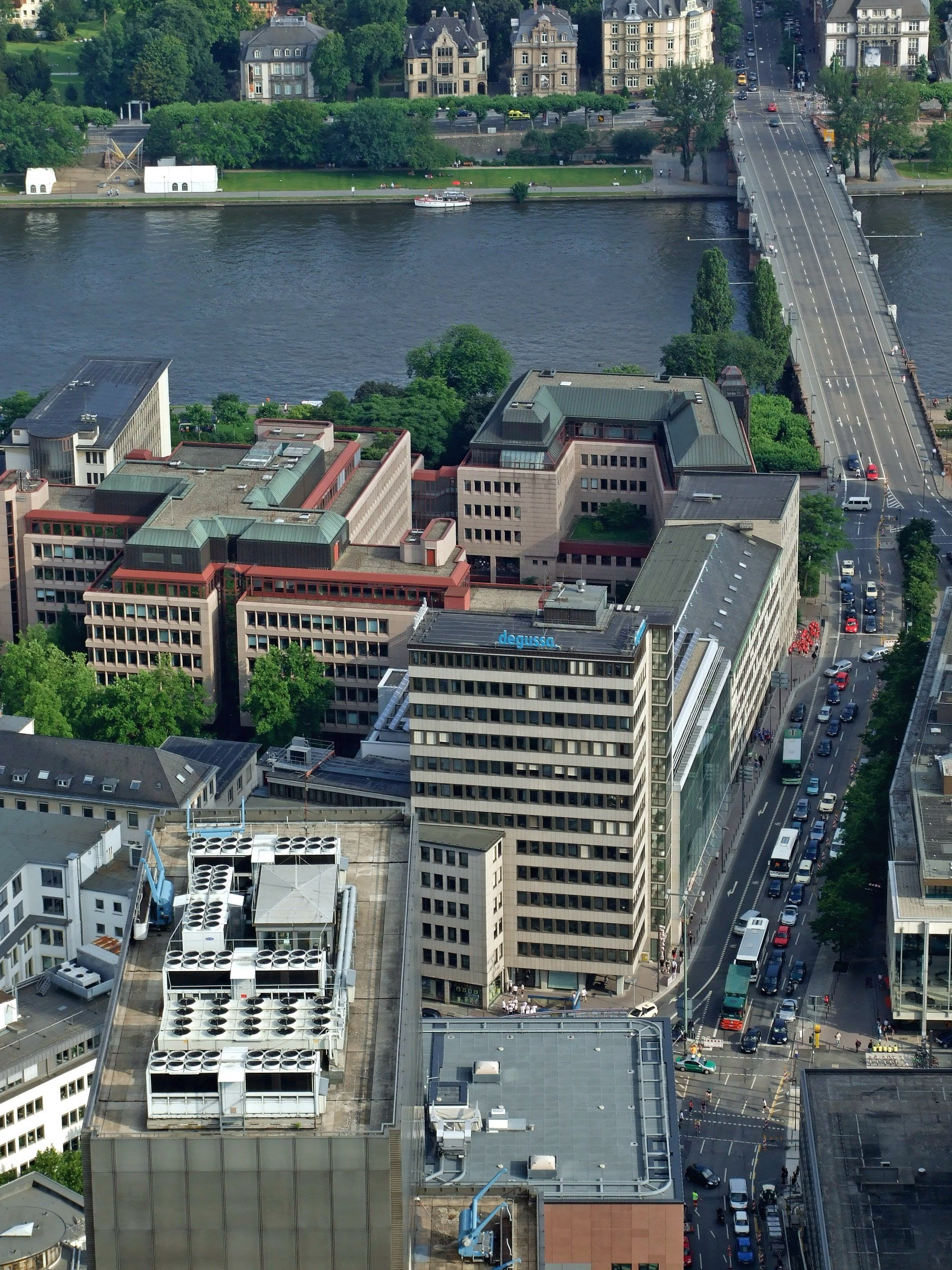
View from the Main Tower of the Degussa site with Untermain Bridge (June 2007)

=== MainTor Porta ===
The 70-meter-high Maintor-Porta high-rise on Weißfrauenstraße, designed by KSP Engel & Zimmermann, was completed at the end of 2014. In 2012 and 2013, Union Investment rented the building's 22,500 m^{2} office space for its new headquarters in two steps. At the end of 2013, it was announced that the fund company's real estate fund subsidiary had bought the building for 155 million euros.

=== MainTor Panorama ===
The 64-meter-high Maintor Panorama high-rise on the corner of Neue Mainzer Straße and Untermainkai is based on the height and shape of the neighboring Swiss National High-rise. The building was designed by Christoph Mäckler . At the beginning of 2013, the commercial law firm CMS Hasche Sigle rented over 9,000 m^{2} of office space (around 70 percent of the total office space). When the building was completed at the end of 2015, 77% of the space was rented.

=== MainTor Primus ===
The old 48-meter-high Degussa high-rise was revitalized in autumn 2011, marking the beginning of the first construction phase of the MainTor project. The redesign was carried out by KSP Engel & Zimmermann, who made the building, now called Maintor Primus, look more like the Porta high-rise. The high-rise was sold to a private investor before the renovation work began. The first office tenant, DIC (Deutsche Immobilien Chancen), moved its Frankfurt headquarters to the Primus after the building was completed in April 2014, renting 3,700 m^{2} on seven floors.

=== MainTor Palais, Patio & Palazzi ===
The classicist and listed Hermann Schlosser House on the Untermainkai, built in 1823, served Degussa for representative and celebratory occasions from 1955 onwards.

The MainTor project is rounded off with exclusive residential buildings in the first and second row on the banks of the Main. The 97 condominiums in the six to eight-storey palazzi facing the Untermainkai were already sold before the opening in February 2016. In the seven-storey Maintor Patio, the first of the 92 high-quality rental apartments were ready for occupancy in spring 2015.

== Buildings ==
Name	Image	Height m (ft)	Floors	Function	Construction period	Ref
WinX		110 m (360 ft)	29	Office / Retail	2015–2017	
Porta		70 m (230 ft)	18	Office	2011–2014	
Panorama		64 m (210 ft)	17	Office	2013–2015	

== See also ==
- List of tallest buildings in Frankfurt
- List of tallest buildings in Germany
