= Edge East Side Tower =

Tallest building in Berlin

EDGE East Side Tower
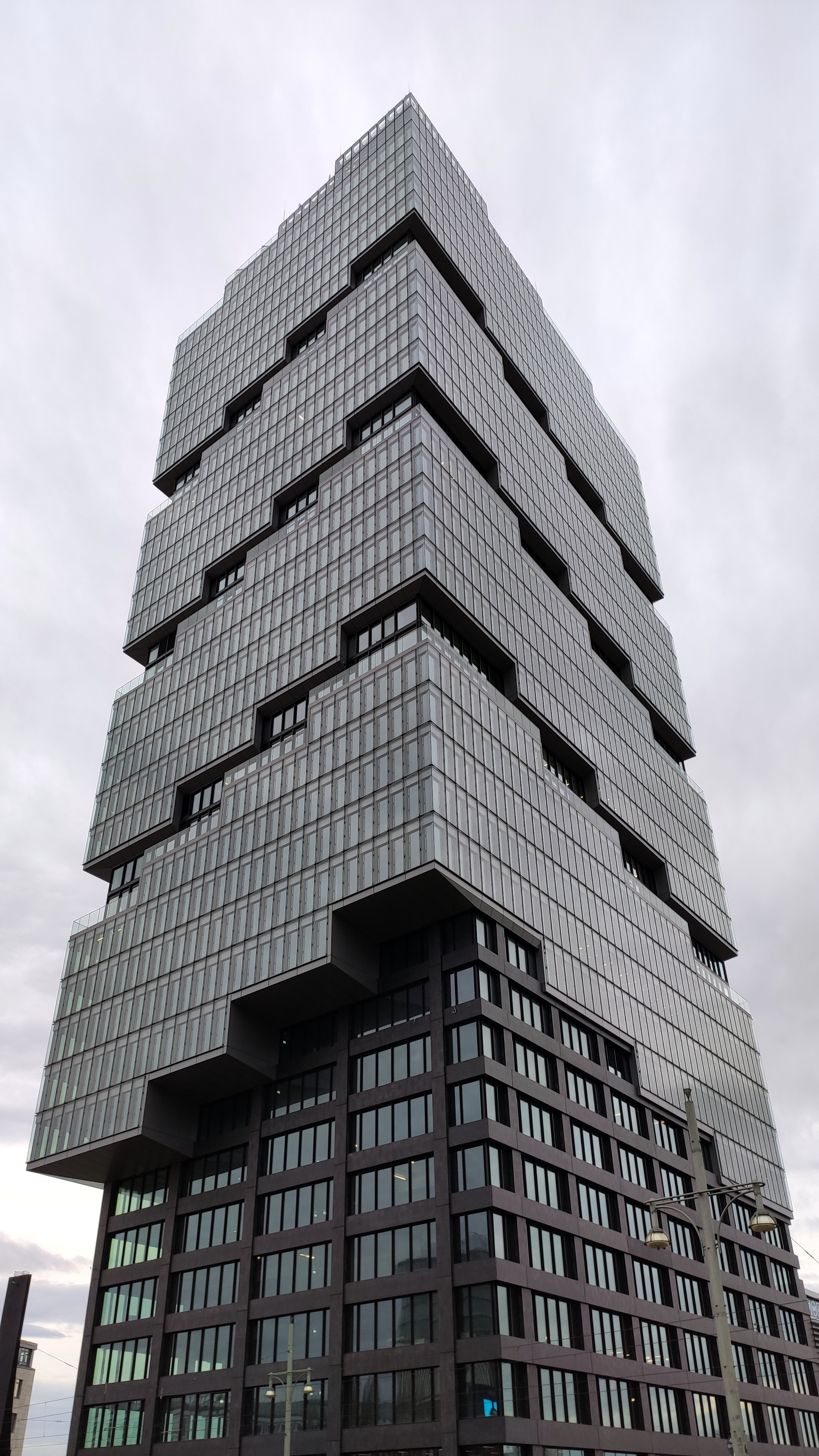
- EDGE East Side Tower
- Interactive map of the EDGE East Side Tower area

General information
- Location: Friedrichshain, Berlin, Germany
- Coordinates: 52.50603°N 13.448507°E
- Construction started: 2019
- Completed: 2023
- Owner: Allianz Real Estate and Universal-Investment

Height
- Roof: 142 m (466 ft)

Technical details
- Floor count: 36
- Floor area: 65,000 m^{2} (700,000 ft^{2}) ^{2}

Design and construction
- Architect: Bjarke Ingels Group

References
- Website

EDGE East Side Tower is a 36-storey, 142 metres (466 ft) skyscraper in the Friedrichshain district of Berlin, Germany. It is currently the tallest multistory building in the city, until the completion of the Estrel Tower. It was completed at the end of 2023, and was designed by Bjarke Ingels Group. The main tenant is Amazon.

== Planning and Execution ==
The designs were preceded by an invitation competition for three teams of architects, which was won by the Danish architectural firm Bjarke Ingels Group. The Senate's specifications were based on the valid Berlin development plan from 2004, which was entitled Rough & Wild and aimed to fit the single tower well into the existing buildings in the area. This refers not only to the East Side Gallery, but also to the Allianz-occupied Treptowers (development plan V-3, Mark 1). The development plan thus appears in connection with the development of the Mediaspree, for which the Senate had a new land use plan for the area since 2002.

Based on the development plan, there was planning permission, on which discussions with the district and the building committee took place in the course of 2018. On 19 March 2019, a building application was submitted by Della S.à.rl (Luxembourg). The building permit was granted on 2 September 2019 by the Friedrichshain-Kreuzberg district office. The building committee of the Senate administration had requested further adjustments to the first draft, which led to a change in the base area and the rhythm of the columns and beams. In a consultation of the building committee of the Senate Building Director Regula Lüscher in September 2019, however, it was expressed that most experts viewed the proposed changes as more of a "cosmetic". However, because the approval had already been granted, further replanning was hardly possible. Discussions on the withdrawal of building rights in October 2019 turned out to be legally hopeless – the “particularly high urban planning and architectural quality” required in the Berlin high-rise guidelines therefore does not have to be applied.

The cost of the new building is estimated at around 400 million euros. The first builder of the project was the project developer Edge, a subsidiary of the Dutch OVG Real Estate.

In July 2019, the construction site was prepared and the first containers were set up. In the summer of 2019, the project was sold to a joint venture between Allianz Real Estate and Universal-Investment. In February 2020, the first crane was set up and the foundation prepared. In October 2020, the excavation pit was dug. The foundation stone was laid in January 2021. The topping-out ceremony was celebrated on 12 October 2022. The glazing was completed in March 2023.

Completion and opening for this tower was planned for 2023. The handover from project developer Edge to Pimco Prime Real Estate (formerly Allianz Real Estate) took place in January 2024. This marks the start of interior work. Amazon plans to move in at the end of 2024.(outdated) The planned restaurants on the ground floor and the top floor, as well as a floor with offices for non-profit organizations, will be open to the public.

The public pension insurance company Bayerische Versorgungskammer (BVK) is the final investor behind the EDGE East Side Towers.

== Design ==
The EDGE East Side Tower was built on the area west of Warschauer Street on Warschauer Brücke, right next to the railroad tracks. With its height, it is an eye-catcher at this location and is part of the Mediaspree, one of the largest urban development projects in Berlin.

The office space amounts to around 65,000 m^{2}. Nine floors were built on a rectangular base with a grid pattern all around. A staircase-like curtain wall begins above, which is evenly distributed over the remaining floors. In addition to the office space, the first two floors are open to the public and have restaurants, cafés and event rooms. The client also planned a bar on the roof of the tower.

Double-decker elevators from Kone are installed in the building.

== See also ==
- List of tallest buildings in Berlin
