= Frank Barkow =

American architect (born 1957)

Frank Barkow (born 1957) is an American architect. His practice Barkow Leibinger, founded with his partner Regine Leibinger, is known for industrial architecture (e.g.Trumpf Campus in Farmington, CT and in Stuttgart), domestic and cultural projects (e.g. the Biosphere in Potsdam and Fellows Pavilion for the American Academy in Berlin), as well as for the two landmark office towers, the TRUTEC Building in Seoul (2006) and the Tour Total in Berlin (2012).

Both Barkow and Leibinger favor a material architecture, a conviction that architectural ideas and materials are inherently related and interconnected. This allows their work to respond to advancing knowledge and technology as well as to the handcrafted, and thus explore new materials and their applications.

== Education and career ==
Frank Barkow studied architecture at Montana State University and at Harvard Graduate School of Design under the chairmanship of Rafael Moneo. While at Harvard, he met Regine Leibinger, a German architect. In 1993, Frank and Regine founded Barkow Leibinger in Berlin, Germany.

== Academic ==
Frank Barkow teaches at Harvard Graduate School of Design. Previously he was visiting professor at the Royal College of Art in London, the EPFL, the Architectural Association in London and Cornell University Ithaca, NY, among others. In 2007 he taught at the University of Wisconsin, Milwaukee as part of the Marcus Prize, an international prize for emerging talent in architecture. He held lectures at the Monterey Design Conference, the Walter Gropius Symposium at Bauhaus Dessau, the Alvar Aalto Symposium at the University of Jyväskylä in Helsinki. Further lectures include the UDK Berlin, MoMA New York, Washington University in St. Louis, Rice University in Houston, American Academy Berlin, Nottingham Contemporary UK, USC School of Architecture in Los Angeles, Macintosh School of Architecture in Glasgow, Pratt Institute School of Architecture in New York, AA School of Architecture in London, Städelschule in Frankfurt am Main, The Architectural League in New York, Yale University School of Architecture in New Haven, University of Pennsylvania in Philadelphia, ETH Zürich and Cornell University in Ithaca, among others.

== Research and publications ==
With the AA London, Barkow Leibinger published "An Atlas of Fabrication" - a compilation of architectural research, as well as "Bricoleur/Bricolage" - which led Hal Foster, Princeton, to following statement in the most recent publication "Spielraum":

"In the end Barkow Leibinger are bricoleurs as much as they are engineers. ... There is always an element of inspired performance in bricolage. And as the greatest philosophers in German aesthetics tell us, such play (Spiel) is also essential to art; it opens up a realm for an imaginative response to any question. In the end, this is what Barkow Leibinger offer us all: Spielraum, room for play, space for invention."

== Exhibitions, collections and prizes ==
Barkow Leibinger's work has been widely exhibited, national and internationally, including the Architecture Biennale in Venice 2008 and 2014, the 4th Marrakech Biennial "Higher Atlas", the Pinakothek der Moderne Munich, Oslo Architecture Triennale, DAM Frankfurt, MoMA New York, 032c Berlin, AA London, among others. Frank Barkow co-curated the exhibition of twelve Berlin based architecture practices "How Soon is Now" at Judin Gallery Berlin in 2014. Barkow Leibinger's work is included in the permanent collections of MoMA, New York, and the Deutsches Architektur Museum, Frankfurt. They have won three National AIA Honor Awards for Architecture [1] and the Marcus Prize for Architecture, Milwaukee, among others.

== Selected projects ==
- Day-care Center, Berlin Buchholz, 1997/1998
- Customer and Training Center, Farmington, Connecticut, USA, 1999
- Biosphere, Potsdam, 2001
- Customer and Administration Building, Ditzingen, 2003
- Grüsch Pavillon I and II, Grüsch, Switzerland, 2001/2004
- Training Center with Cafeteria, Neukirch, 2005
- Trutec Building, Seoul, Korea, 2006
- Gate House, Ditzingen, 2007
- Campus Restaurant, Ditzingen, 2008
- Laser Factory, Farmington, Connecticut, USA, 2008
- Office Building with Training Workshop, Hettingen, 2009
- Development Center, Ditzingen, 2009
- Site Master Plan Bayer Schering Pharma, Berlin, 2010
- Stadthaus M1 Vauban, Freiburg im Breisgau, 2012
- Tour Total Berlin, 2012
- Estrel Tower Berlin, competition 2014, 1. prize
- Fraunhofer Research Campus, Waischenfeld, 2014
- Fellows Pavilion, American Academy in Berlin, 2015
- Aufbau Haus 84, 2015

== Publications (selection) ==
- Cultivating the Landscape, Editor Galerie Aedes, Berlin, exhibition catalogue, 1999
- Werkbericht 1993–2001 / Workreport Barkow Leibinger, Editor George Wagner, Basel, Birkhäuser, 2001
- Barkow Leibinger Architects Works | Opere BY 7, Editor Marcella Gallotta, Melfi: Casa Editrice Librìa, 2004
- Barkow Leibinger Architects C3, Editor Uje Lee, Seoul, Korea, 2007
- Reflect - Building in the Digital Media City, Seoul, Korea, Hrsg. Andres Lepik, Hatje Cantz, Ostfildern, 2007
- An Atlas of Fabrication, Editor Pamela Johnson, AA Publication, London, 2009
- Bricoleur/Bricolage, AA Publications, London 2013
- Spielraum, Hatje Cantz, Berlin, 2014
