= WinX =

Skyscraper in Frankfurt, Germany

WinX Tower
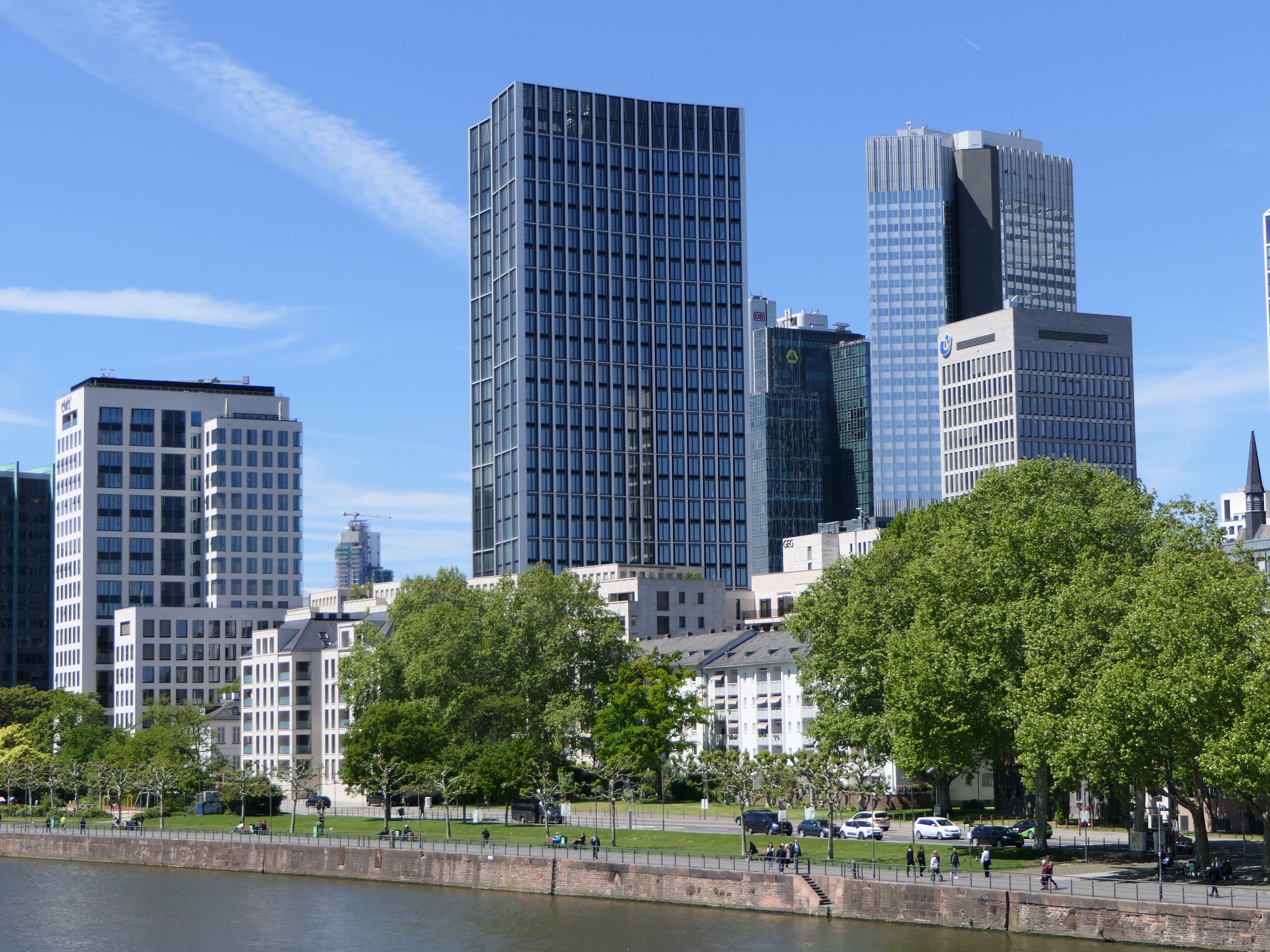
- WinX Tower (center)

General information
- Status: Completed
- Type: Mixed-use: Office / Retail
- Location: Frankfurt, Germany, 6 Neue Mainzer St., Frankfurt am Main, Germany
- Coordinates: 50.10817°N 8.67549°E
- Construction started: 2015
- Completed: 2017

Height
- Roof: 110 m (360 ft)

Technical details
- Structural system: Concrete
- Floor count: 29
- Floor area: 62,393 m^{2} (672,000 sq ft)

Design and construction
- Architects: KSP Jürgen Engel Architekten
- Main contractor: BAM Deutschland AG; Aukett + Heese

The WinX Tower is a mixed-use high-rise building in the Innenstadt district of Frankfurt, Germany. Built between 2015 and 2017, the tower stands at 110 m (360 ft) tall with 29 floors and is the current 37th tallest building in Frankfurt.

== History ==
Located in the Innenstadt district of Frankfurt, the WinX Tower is part of the MainTor building complex alongside the Maintor Porta and Maintor Pamnorama high-rise buildings which were built on the former land plot of the German chemical company of Degussa. Alongside the main complex, the tower was awarded the MIPIM AR Future Projects Award in the category "Best German Project" on February 8, 2012, in Cannes.

=== Architecture ===
The WinX Tower (pronounced Wings), designed by KSP Engel & Zimmermann, is 110 meters high. 28 floors will provide a total area of around 34,850 m^{2} for offices, restaurants and commercial spaces. A sweeping transparent roof finish is intended to take some of the weight off the building. Access to the high-rise will be via a 26-meter-high portal building on Neue Mainzer Straße. The building, construction of which began in early 2015, was sold to German entrepreneur Susanne Klatten in November 2014. The tower is scheduled to be occupied in summer 2019 and is already fully rented. The law firm DLA Piper announced in May 2020 that it would move into floors 22 to 27 and the roof terrace on the 28th floor of the building.

Aukett + Heese received a contract from BAM Deutschland AG to complete the detailed design for the portal building and the WinX high-rise, which is the last phase of the MainTor site development in Frankfurt am Main. The tower stands at a height of 110 m, displaying office spaces, global cuisine, an 11 meter high glass entrance, and a skylounge overlooking the Main River. The tower blends modernist design with contemporary space and energy management, along with high-tech fixtures. Additionally, there is a large underground parking lot with approximately 180 spots for parking available.

DIC MainTor WINX GmbH is the customer. KSP Jürgen Engel Architekten GmbH created the design. The DGNB Platinum certification was awarded to the building.

The tower, situated in the Maintor quarter, is the tallest among those directly facing the Main River, connecting the river, Old Town Frankfurt, and the CBD. It distinguishes itself from the rest of the Maintor buildings with its unique materials and design, featuring a shiny metallic exterior and an unconventional x-shaped base. The entryway is the seven-level gateway structure on Neue Mainzer Strasse, signaling the start of the WinX Tower, blending traditional architectural elements with a sense of energy.

The tower received its DGNB Platinum Certificate of sustainability credentials.

== See also ==
- List of tallest buildings in Frankfurt
- List of tallest buildings in Germany
