= List of tallest buildings in Offenbach =

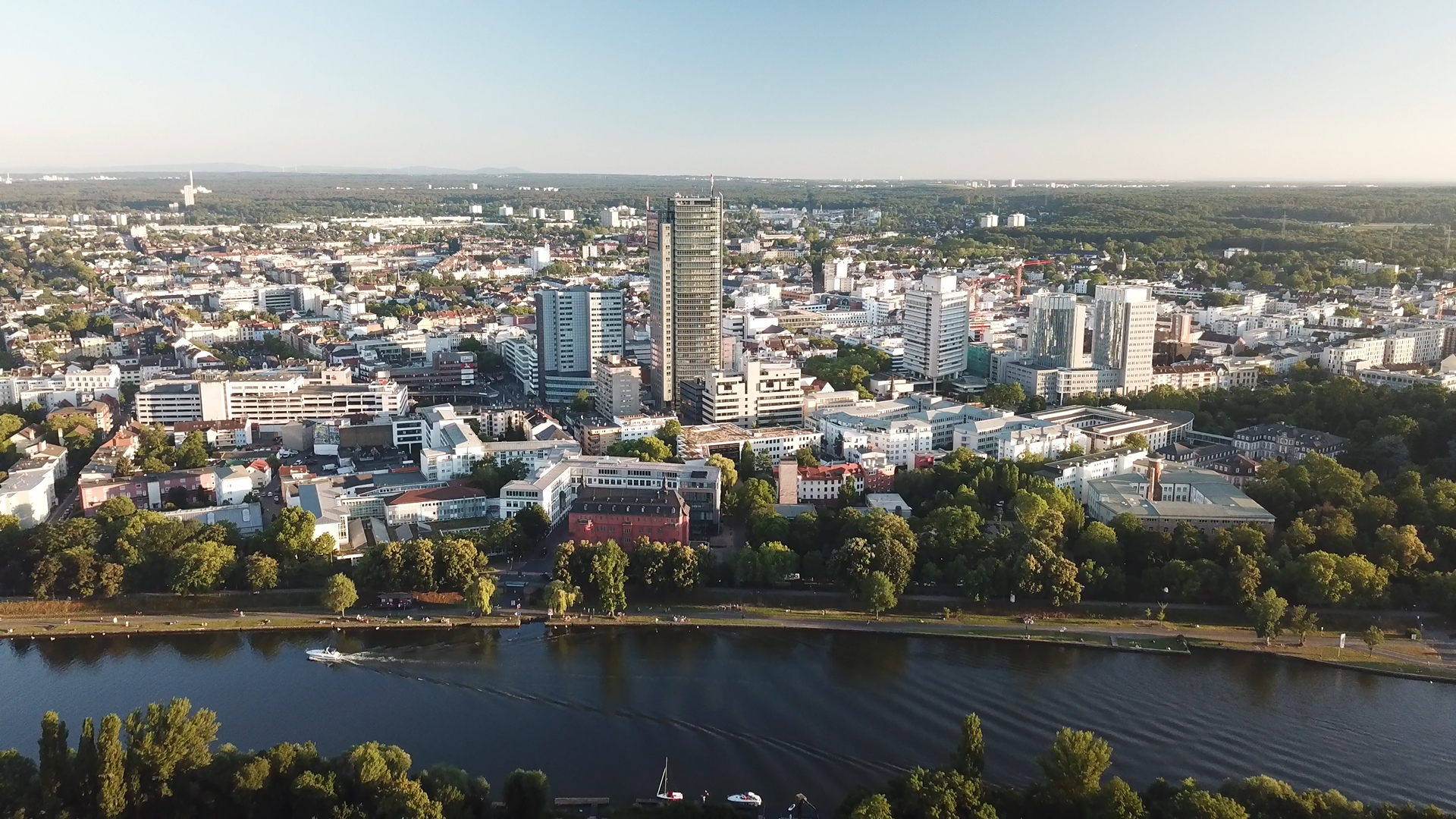
Offenbach skyline: from left to right — Stadthaus, City Tower, City Hall and Haus der Wirtschaft 1 & 2

This list of tallest buildings in Offenbach ranks high-rise buildings and important landmarks that reach a height of 50 meters (164 feet). The tallest skyscraper in the city is the 32-storey, 120-meter-high City Tower Offenbach, built in 2003.

Offenbach am Main is a city in Hesse, Germany, on the left bank of the river Main. It borders directly on the neighboring city of Frankfurt am Main and is part of the Frankfurt Rhine-Main area.

Rank	Name	Image	Height m (ft)	Floors	Year completed	Use / Note
1	City Tower Offenbach		120 m (394 ft)	32	2003	Height to tip 140 m (459 ft)
2	Berliner Straße 295 (Siemens-Towers)		75 m (246 ft)	22	1973	Part of new Vitopia Campus Kaiserlei
3	City Hall		72 m (236 ft)	20	1971	Seat of the City administration and the city council.
3	Neusalzer Straße 77		72 m (236 ft)	24	1970s	Residential
5	Stadthaus		70 m (230 ft)	19	1977	
6	Haus der Wirtschaft 1		68 m (223 ft)	16	1998	Office
7	New Century Hotel (Golden Tulip Hotel)		66 m (217 ft)	17	1970s	Hotel
8	Haus der Wirtschaft 2		61 m (200 ft)	14	1998	Office
9	Berliner Straße 303 (Siemens-Towers)		60 m (197 ft)	19	1973	Part of new Vitopia Campus Kaiserlei
10	Hochhaus Deutscher Wetterdienst		55 m (180 ft)	15		Office
11	former Pacific Bank-Haus		~50 m (164 ft)	13		Office
12	Kaiserstraße 101			16		Residential
13	Sana Klinikum - Bettenhaus			15		Hospital building
13	Berliner Straße 11			15		Residential
13	Odenwaldring 102			15		Residential
13	Hochhaus Nordring			15		Residential
13	Buchrainweg 61/63			15		Residential
13	Buchrainweg 65/67			15		Residential

== Proposed ==
Name	Height (m)	Height (ft)	Floors	Year
NAMU Tower	120	394	32	2027
Die Macherei (Hotel)	75	246	20	Unknown
Vitopia Campus Kaiserlei (1)	75	246	17	On hold
WAYV Riverside Office Tower	70	230	18	Unknown
Die Macherei (Office)	62	203	17	Unknown
Berliner Höfe	61	200	19	Unknown
Vitopia Campus Kaiserlei (2)	60	196	19	On hold
Vitopia Campus Kaiserlei (3)	60	196	19	On hold

== See also ==
- List of tallest buildings in Germany
- List of tallest structures in Germany
