= City Tower (Offenbach am Main) =

Skyscraper in Offenbach am Main, Germany

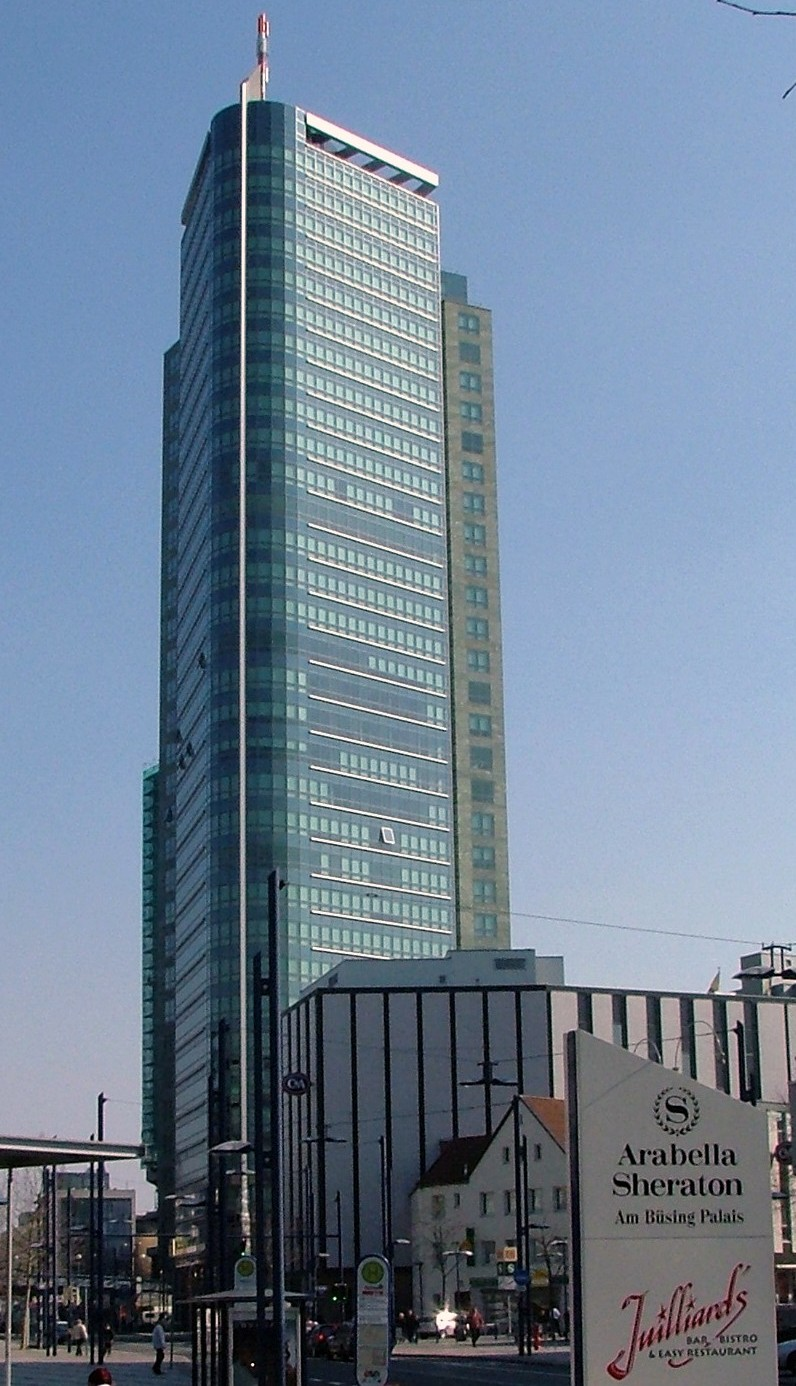
- Interactive map of the City Tower area

General information
- Status: Completed
- Type: Office
- Location: Offenbach am Main, Germany, 76 Berliner Str., Offenbach am Main, Germany
- Coordinates: 50°06′21″N 8°45′48″E
- Construction started: 2001
- Completed: 2003

Height
- Roof: 120 m (390 ft)

Technical details
- Structural system: Concrete
- Floor count: 32
- Floor area: 23,000 m^{2} (248,000 sq ft)

Design and construction
- Architect: Novotny Mähner Assoziierte
- Structural engineer: Hochtief

The City Tower is a high-rise office building in the Mathildenviertel district of Offenbach am Main, Germany. Built between 2001 and 2003, the tower stands at 120 m (390 ft) tall with 32 floors and is the current 48th tallest building in Germany and the tallest in Offenbach.

== History ==
=== Architecture ===
The building is located on the Berliner Strasse in Offenbach am Main, completed in 2003. The tower has two basement floors including the underground car park, a ground floor with a gallery and 32 upper floors and has a gross floor area of 23,000 square meters on 700 square meters of floor space. The technical systems are located in the first and second basement floors as well as in parts of the 25th floor and the entire 33rd floor.

By installing a steel mast almost 18 meters high, the building's official height is 120 m (390 ft) by roof and 140 m (460 ft) by antenna spire, making it the tallest building in the city of Offenbach. The City Tower is located in the city center directly on the market square with a connection to the Rhine-Main S-Bahn network. As part of the new construction plans, the 8,000 square meter Hugenottenplatz was redesigned and renovated, as was the five-story office building "Kubus" opposite.

The design for the City Tower was created by the Offenbach-based architectural firm Novotny Mähner Assoziierte. The building's main tennant is the Commerz Grundbesitz Investmentgesellschaft mbH (CGI). The facility management was carried out by Hochtief Facility Management GmbH. Since October 2014, the property has been managed commercially and technically by the Hausmaxx Group. Construction took place from December 2000 to January 2003. The main tenant in the City Tower was the management consultancy Capgemini until 2017, and since then it has been the tire manufacturer Falken Tyre Europe. The vacancy currently amounts to around 20,000 square meters, meaning that the majority of the office space is unoccupied.

The structure consists of 33 floors and offers approximately 25,000 square meters of rental area. Within two underground levels, there are 197 parking spots, alongside two basement levels that feature a garage, a ground level with a gallery, and 32 additional floors totaling approximately 750 square meters. The quantity of windows to be opened in the main facade is increased to allow for optimal ventilation and to diminish artificial lighting. In conjunction with the facade, cutting-edge energy and building technology promote low-energy and eco-friendly resource-efficient functioning.

== See also ==
- List of tallest buildings in Offenbach
- List of tallest buildings in Germany
