= List of tallest buildings in Bonn =

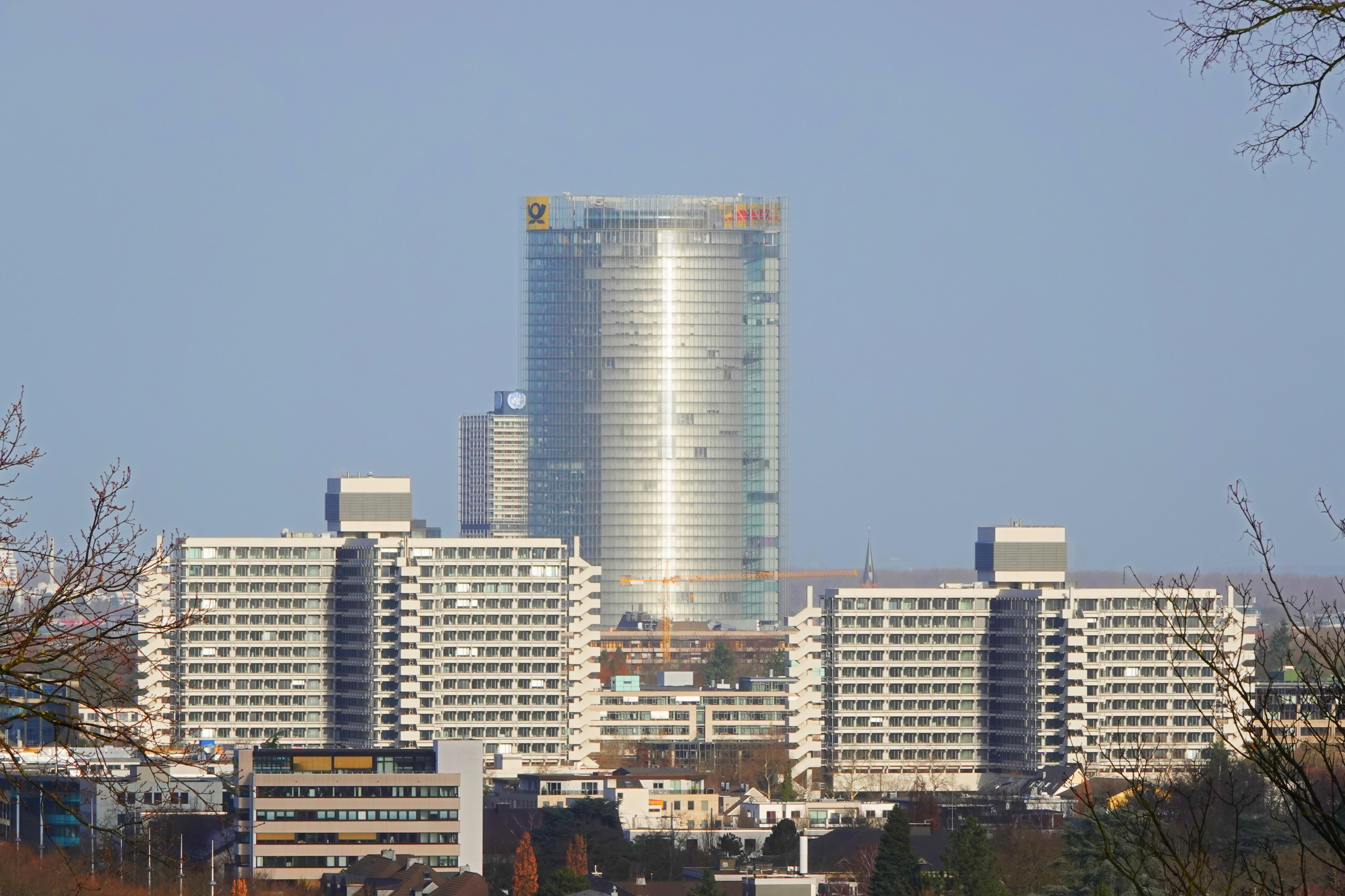
Posttower with Kreuzbauten Bonn

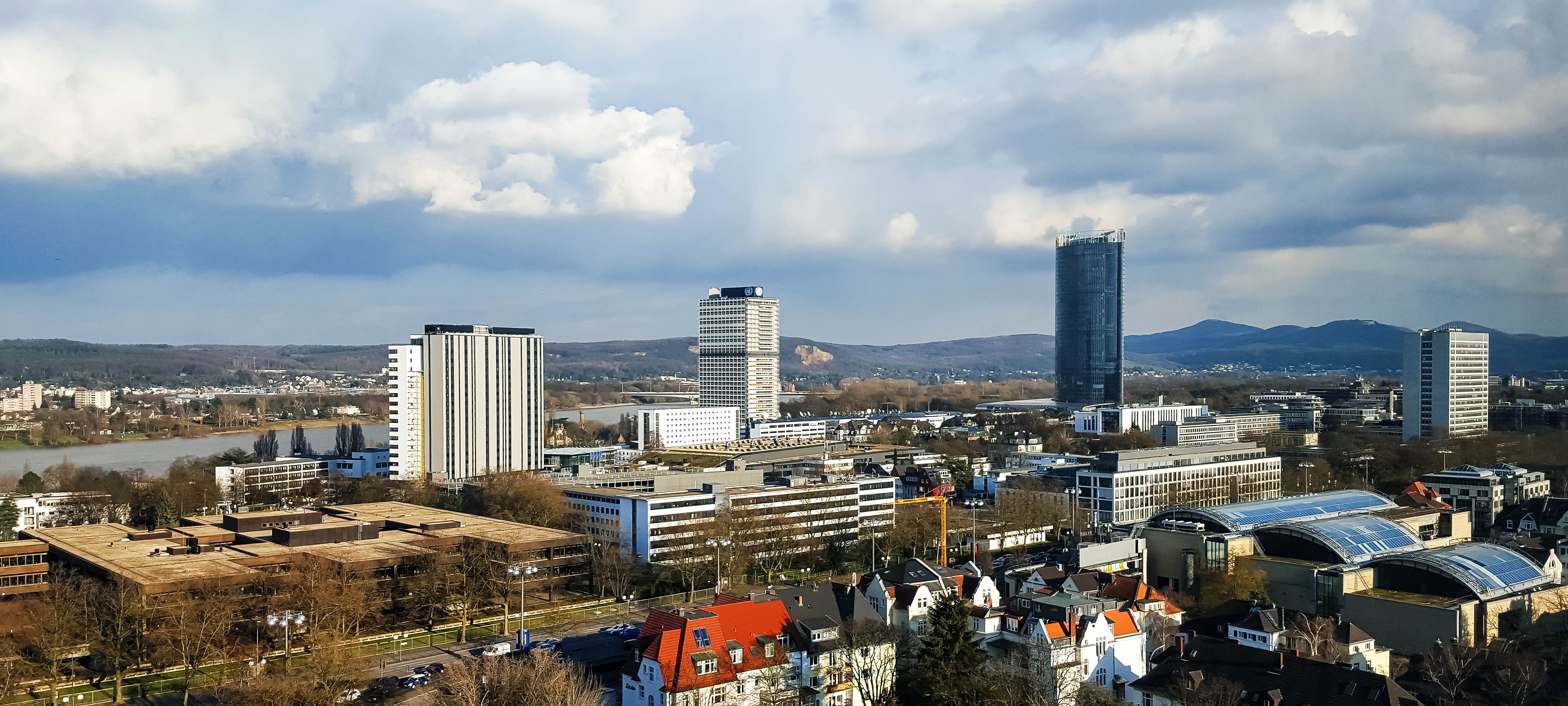
From left to right: Marriot Hotel (World Conference Center), Langer Eugen, Post Tower and Tulpenfeld-Hochhaus

This list of tallest buildings in Bonn ranks high-rise buildings and important landmarks that reach a height of 50 meters (164 feet).

== Current ==
Bonn's skyline is dominated by the 162.5-metre-high Post Tower, which is the sixteenth tallest building in Germany and the only skyscraper outside Frankfurt am Main to date.

The first high-rise building in Bonn to exceed the 100-meter mark was the former "Abgeordnetenhochhaus" (today UN-Hochhaus) popularly known as Langer Eugen, which was completed in 1969.

Several new buildings have been constructed in recent years, such as the "Marriott Hotel of the World Conference Center", the expansion of the UN Campus and, in 2022, the “Neuer Kanzlerplatz”, which replaces the former Bonn Center.

Furthermore, a large number of new high-rise buildings are to be built along the B9 around the Bundesviertel, which are currently being planned in a high-rise master plan.

Rank	Name	Image	Height m (ft)	Floors	Year completed	Use / Note
1	Post Tower		162.5 m (533 ft)	41	2002	Tallest skyscraper in Bonn, tallest in the state of North Rhine-Westphalia and tallest outside of Frankfurt.
2	Langer Eugen		115 m (377 ft)	31	1969	UN Campus, Home of several United Nations organizations.
3	Neuer Kanzlerplatz		101.5 m (333 ft)	28	2023	Office
	Bonn Minster		81.4 m (267 ft)		13th century	Catholic church
	St. Marien		77 m (253 ft)		1892	Catholic church
	Kreuzkirche		72 m (236 ft)		1871	Protestant church
4	Stadthaus		72 m (236 ft)	17	1978	Seat of the city administration
5	Am Römerlager 4		70.4 m (231 ft)	19		Residential
6	Marriott Hotel of the World Conference Center		68 m (223 ft)	17	2009	Hotel
7	Studentenheim "Castell"		67 m (220 ft)	17	1976	Residential
8	Tulpenfeld-Hochhaus		67 m (220 ft)	18	1967	Administrative headquarters of the Bundesnetzagentur
9	Neues UN-Hochhaus		65 m (213 ft)	18	2020	Expansion of the UN Campus
	St. Johann Baptist und Petrus (Stiftskirche)		61 m (200 ft)		1886	Roman Catholic parish church
10	Hochhaus Platanenweg 29		59 m (194 ft)	18	1973	former Medical Office of the German Armed Forces, today Residential
11	Bundeswirtschaftsministerium		56.1 m (184 ft)	14	1972	Federal Ministry of Economics
12	Kreuzbauten I		55.6 m (182 ft)	15	1975	Seat of the Federal Ministry of Education and Research
	Church of the Name of Jesus		53 m (174 ft)		1717	Catholic church
13	Kreuzbauten II			12	1975	Seat of the Federal Ministry of Education and Research
14	Augustinum Hochhaus I		51.9 m (170 ft)	14		Residential
15	Augustinum Hochhaus II		51.9 m (170 ft)	14		Residential

== Proposed ==
Name	Height (m)	Height (ft)	Floors	Year
Aire-Turm	220	722		Unknown
Sunnyside Tower	100	328	25	Unknown
Süd-Tor	80	262	20	Unknown
EZMW-Hochhaus	65	213	18	2026
Hochhaus im Innovationsdreieck	50	164	12	Unknown

== Demolished ==
Name	Image	Height m (ft)	Floors	Opened	Demolished
Bonn-Center		60 m (197 ft)	18	1969	2017 replaced by Neuer Kanzlerplatz

== See also ==
- List of tallest buildings in Germany
- List of tallest structures in Germany
