= PH 16 =

Industrial housing in East Germany

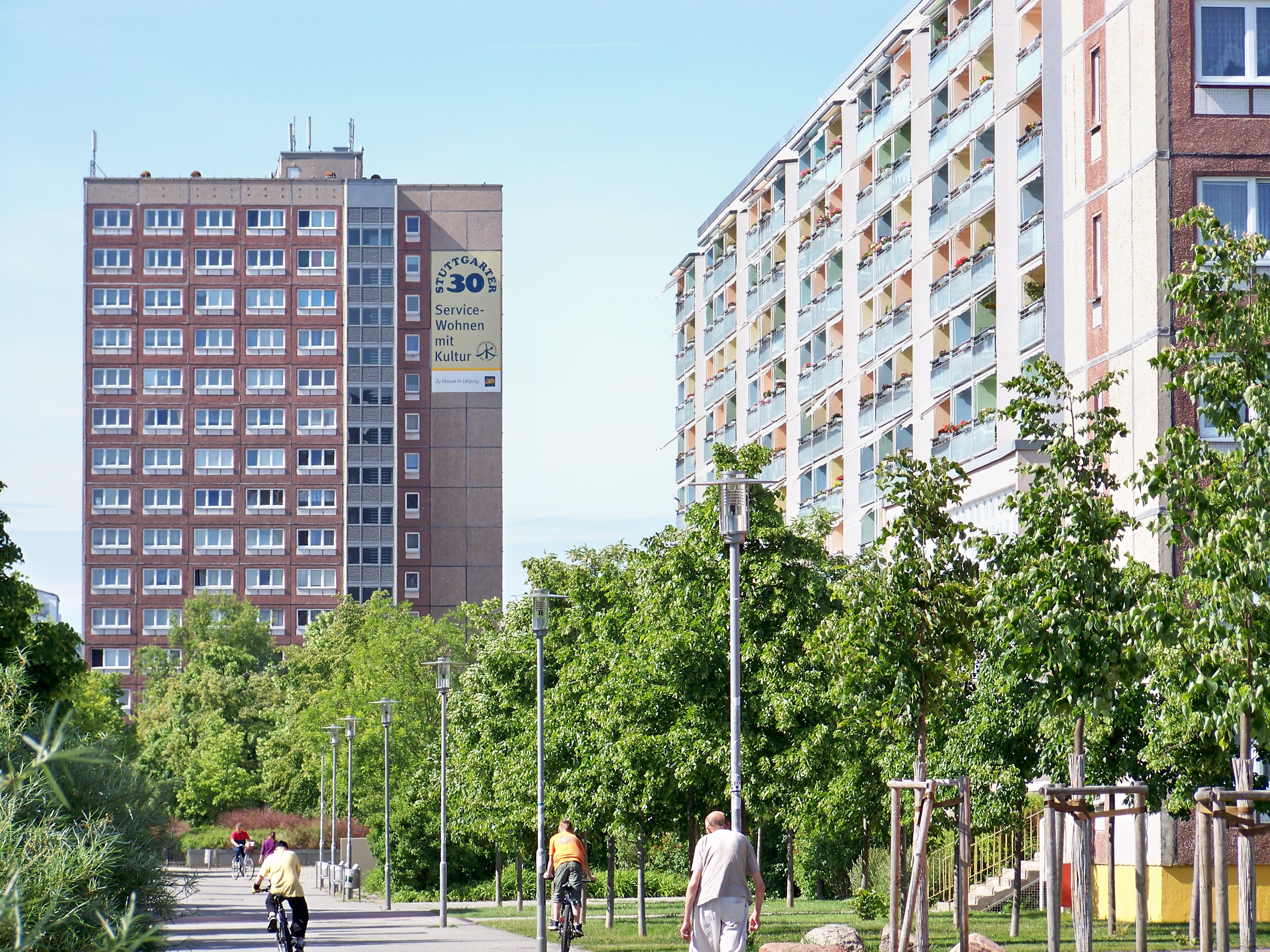
Stuttgarter Allee Grünau with a distinctive point of high-rise buildings (with subsequently attached staircase)

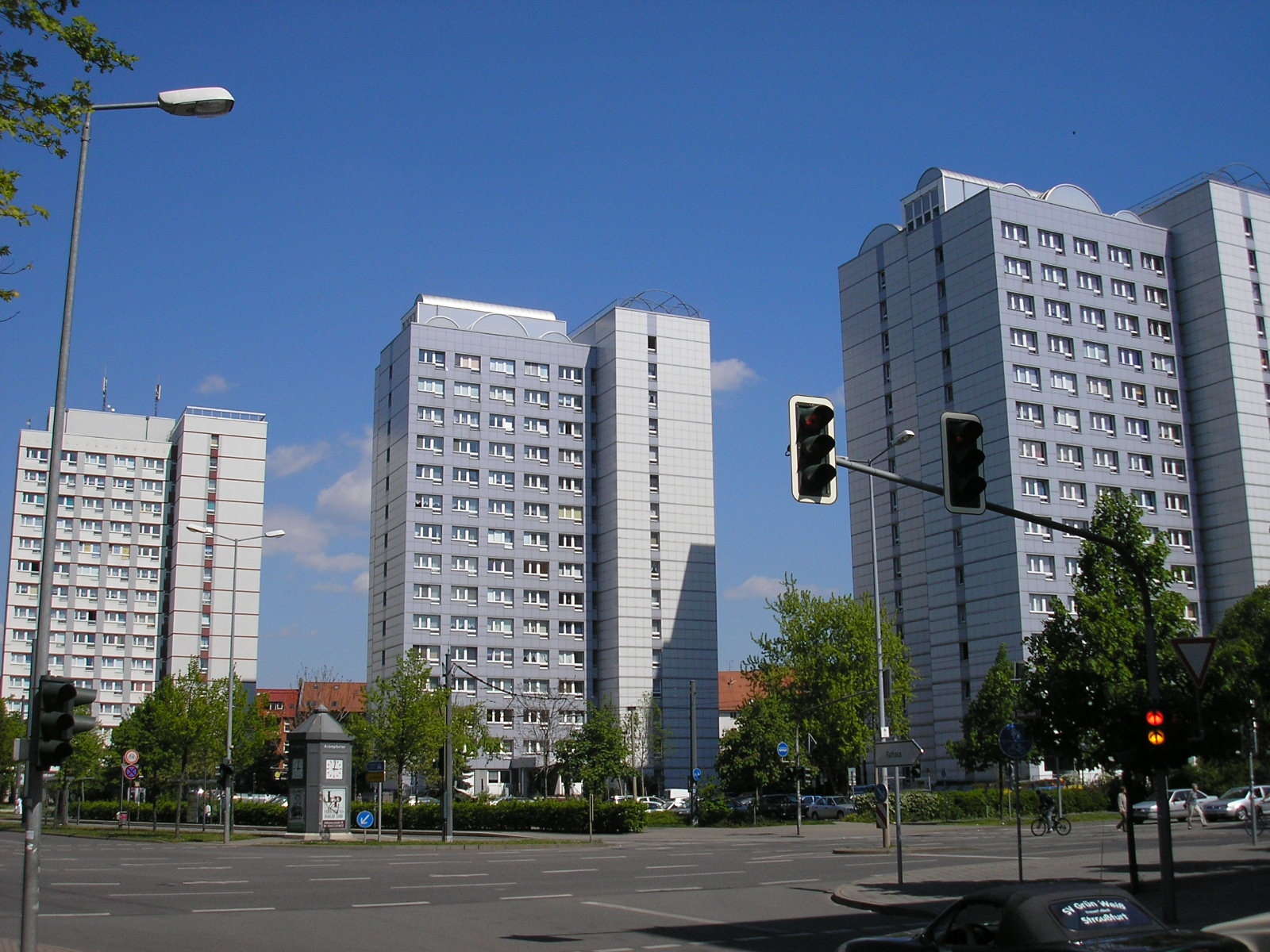
The first three high-rise buildings of this type at Juri-Gagarin-Ring in Erfurt

The PH 16 (German: Punkthochhaus mit 16 Geschossen) is a skyscraper with 16 floors; a type of industrial housing in East Germany.

== Construction ==
The PH 16 has 132 apartments, one or two small commercial units on the ground floor, as well as parking and trash rooms within the building. The development was primarily via two internal lifts and an H-shaped canal system on each floor, which served both 9 apartments. An achievable via a staircase Notbalkon served primarily as an escape route. Originally created next to the stairwell garbage disposals were operated infrequently.

About 400 people lived in a fully leased building. The apartments were designed as one-, two-and three-bedroom apartments, the latter were about 60 m^{2} in extent, and the building corners. They were placed in groups of three apartments on one floor together and mostly to the west, south and east aligned. In the north there was the emergency stairwell. Each group of three shared a special room as a storage area. At the outer ends of the development programs, there were instructors at the window and Notbalkone fire. Due to the design of the building, most apartments oriented towards only one direction, and therefore had only window in that direction.

Urban planning was the PH 16 - always built in groups of at least two buildings - a gateway or high point in the housing estates. With more than 50 meters high, it is one of the highest in the series-built prefabricated types of DDR.

== Heritage ==
The PH 16 has disappeared from almost all cities. Its basic structure does not seem economically viable. If they were not preserved as an urban landmark, they would have been dismantled in recent years by their owners.

== Locations ==
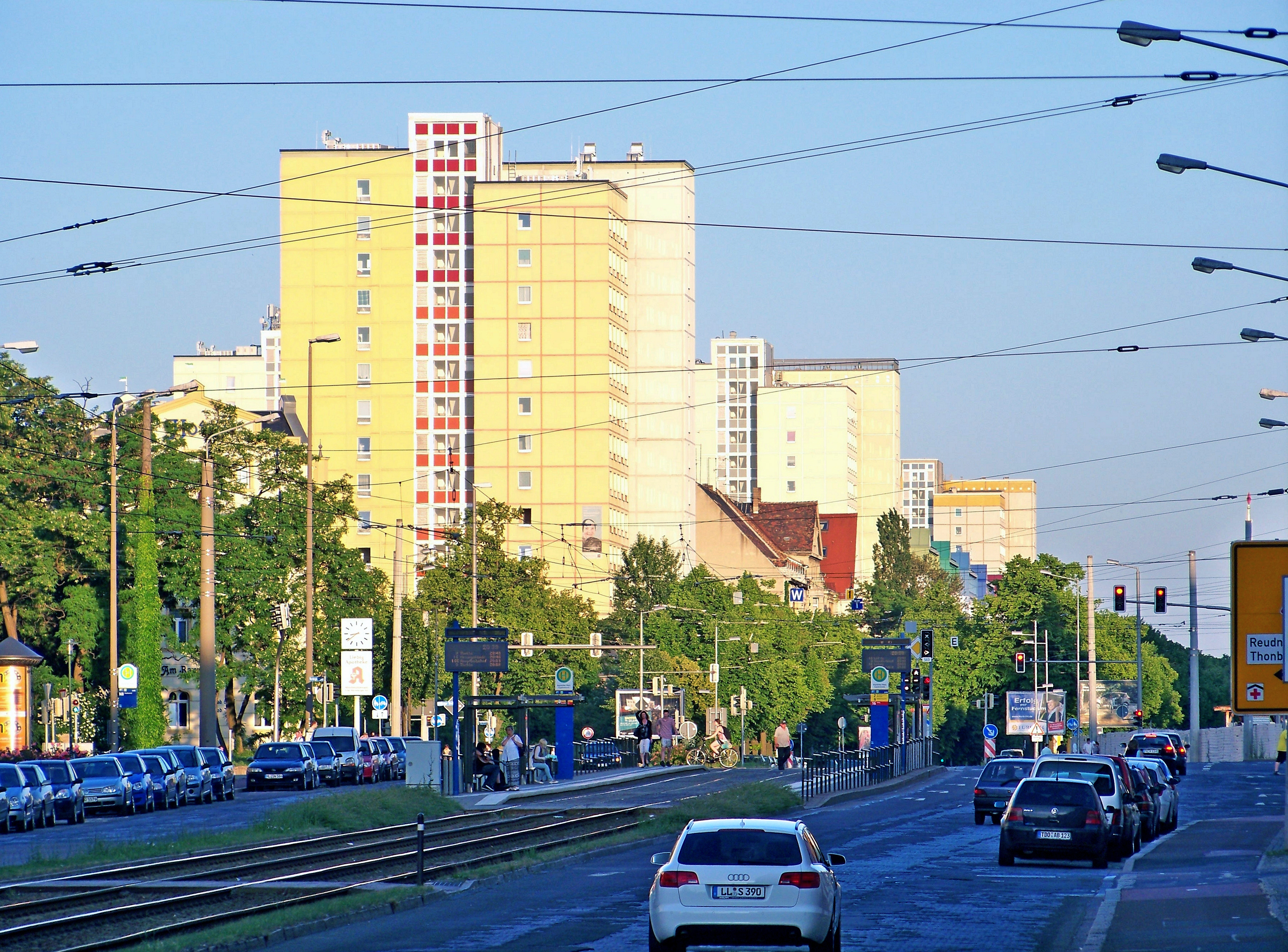
PH 16 along 18th Street October in Leipzig

=== Erfurt ===
- Erfurt, Johannesplatz (alle 5 erhalten)
- Rieth (4 von 6 erhalten)
- Juri-Gagarin-Ring (4 von 5 erhalten)

=== Magdeburg ===
Out of 25 buildings of the type PH 16, 13 were renovated and ten were demolished. The other two buildings remain empty as of 2023.

- Magdeburg Neustädter See (get 8 of 9, which restored 6, 2 renovated)
- Magdeburg Neustädter Feld (all 5 torn down)
- Magdeburg Milchweg (2, 1 renovated und 1 torn down)
- Magdeburg Stadtmitte (3, 1 renovated, 2 demolished)
- Magdeburg Universitäts-Campus (1 renovated ("Campus Tower", formerly called the Uni-Hochhaus)
- Magdeburg Werder (2 renovated)
- Magdeburg Leipziger Straße (3, 2 renovated, 1 torn down)

=== Leipzig ===
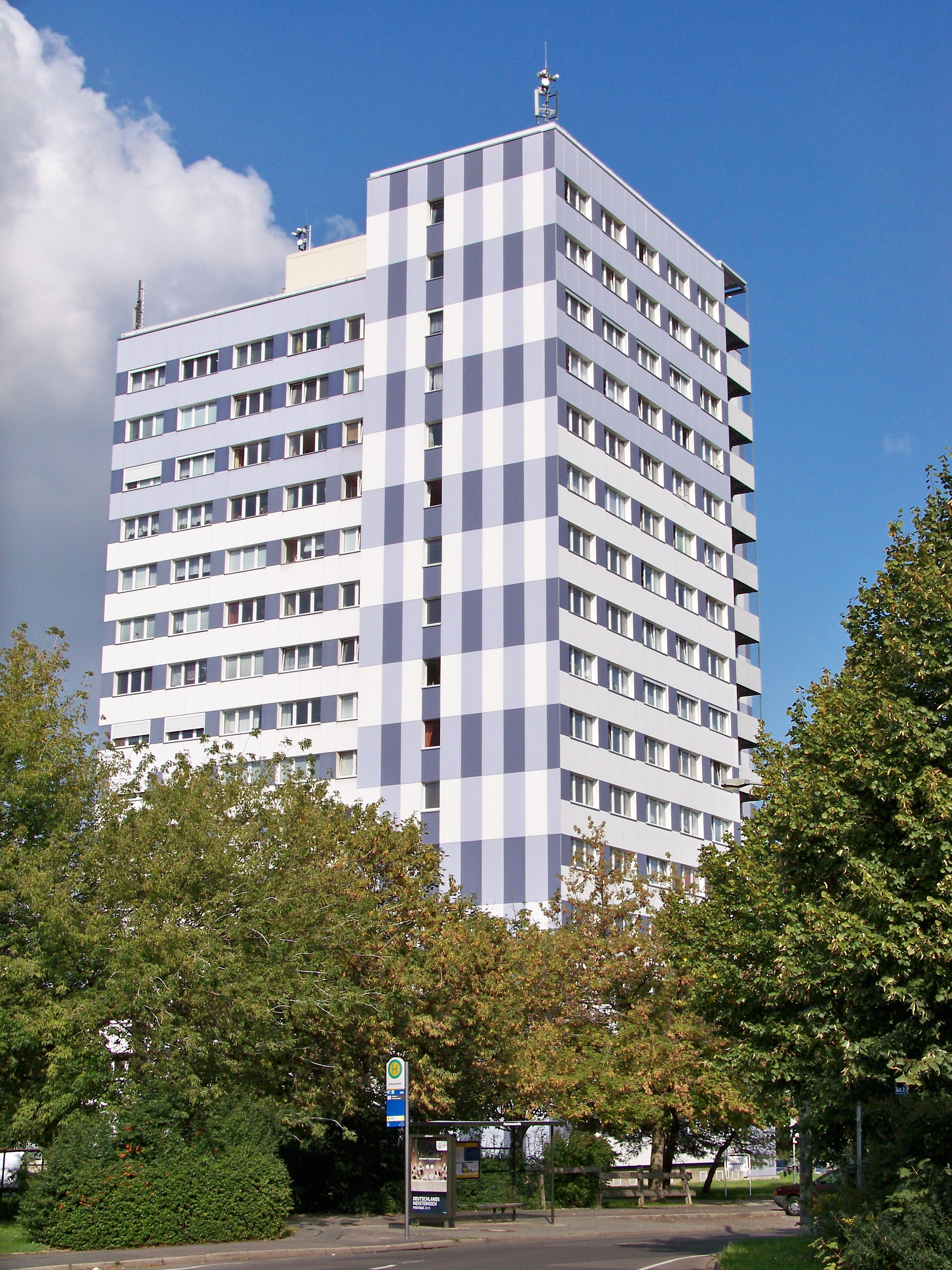
Renovated PH 16 in Leipzig-Mockau

- Leipzig Grünau (5)
- Leipzig Schönefeld (5)
- Leipzig Mockau (4)
- Leipzig, Straße des 18. Oktober (8)
- Leipzig, Musikviertel (3)
- Leipzig-Marienbrunn (both torn down)

=== Gera ===
- De-Smit-Straße 8 (all with new balconies)

=== Cherkasy, Ukraine ===
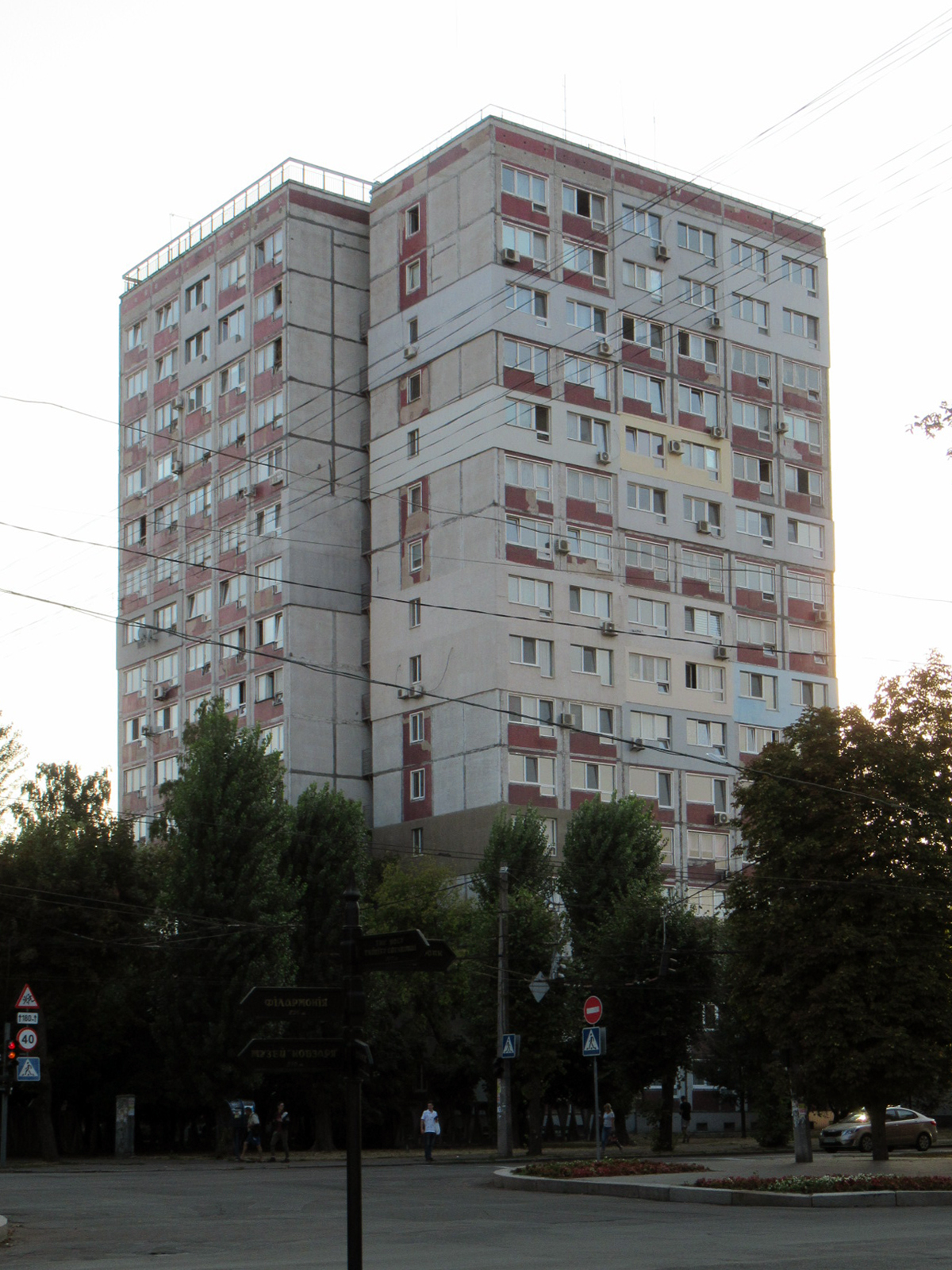
Ukraine, Cherkasy, 200 Shevchenko Blvd.

- 200 Shevchenko Blvd. (1).

== See also ==
- List of tallest buildings in Leipzig
