= Neuer Kanzlerplatz =

High-rise building complex in Bonn, Germany

Neuer Kanzlerplatz Complex
- Stadtquartier Neuer Kanzlerplatz (German)
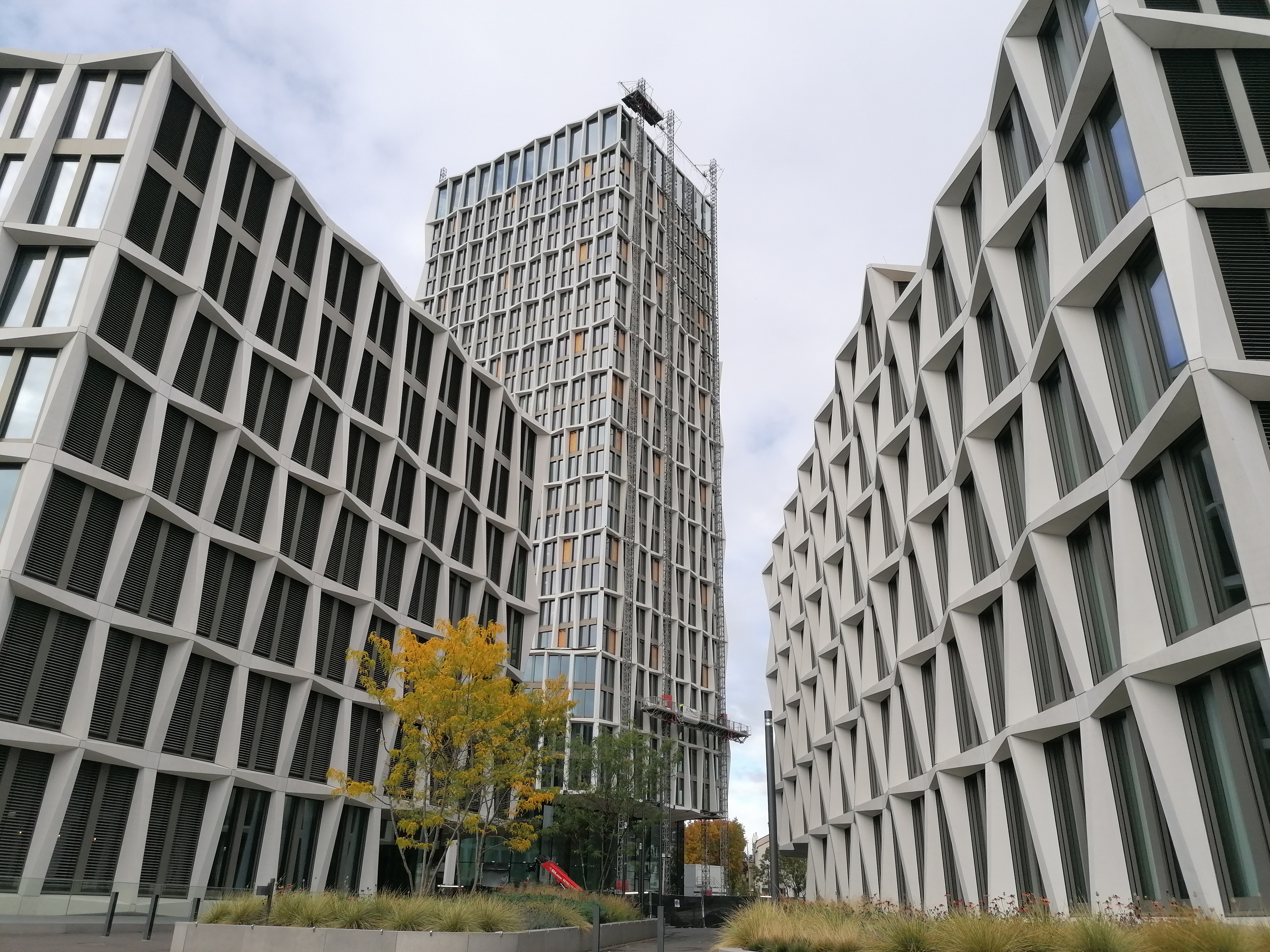
- Interactive map of the Neuer Kanzlerplatz Complex area

General information
- Status: Completed
- Type: Office
- Location: Bonn, Germany, 6 Bundeskanzlerplatz, Bonn, Germany
- Coordinates: 50.71885°N 7.11642°E
- Construction started: 2019
- Completed: 2023
- Cost: €67,800,000

Height
- Roof: 101.5 m (333 ft) (tallest (Hochhaus am Kanzlerplatz))

Technical details
- Floor count: 28 (+3 underground (Hochhaus am Kanzlerplatz))
- Floor area: 66,000 m^{2} (710,000 sq ft)

Design and construction
- Architect: JSWD Architekten
- Developer: Art-Invest Real Estate

Website
- Neuer Kanzlerplatz

The Neuer Kanzlerplatz Complex (German: Stadtquartier Neuer Kanzlerplatz) also known as the Neues Europaquartier is a high-rise office building complex in the Gronau district of Bonn, Germany. Built between 2019 and 2023, the complex consists of three main buildings with the tallest (Hochhaus am Kanzlerplatz) standing at 101.5 m (333 ft) with 28 floors which is the current third tallest building in Bonn.

== History ==
=== Architecture ===
The ensemble was built on the Reuterbrücke on Bundeskanzlerplatz on the edge of the federal quarter in Bonn-Gronau, on the site of the former Bonn Center building which was demolished in March 2017. Unlike its predecessor, it consists of three structurally unconnected buildings, one of which contains the high-rise. Before that, it took a year to clear the rubble from the explosion. The excavation pit was prepared by the end of 2018, and construction began in 2019. The foundation stone was laid on June 14, 2019. On May 5, 2021, the shell of the 18th floor of the high-rise was completed, reaching the height of the former Bonn Center in terms of floors. The ensemble was completed at the end of 2022 and has since had 66,000 m^{2} (710,000 sq ft) of office space spread over 28 floors. 40,000 m^{2} (431,000 sq ft) of it was planned to be rented by Postbank.

Original plans called for a lower building. However, the high-rise structure, which had already been standing for almost 50 years, meant that the permitted total height could be increased to over 100 metres. According to the latest plans, the high-rise in the New City Quarter measures 101.5 metres. This makes it the third highest in the city since its completion. The planned construction costs for the entire complex were given as 67.8 million euros.

== Gallery ==
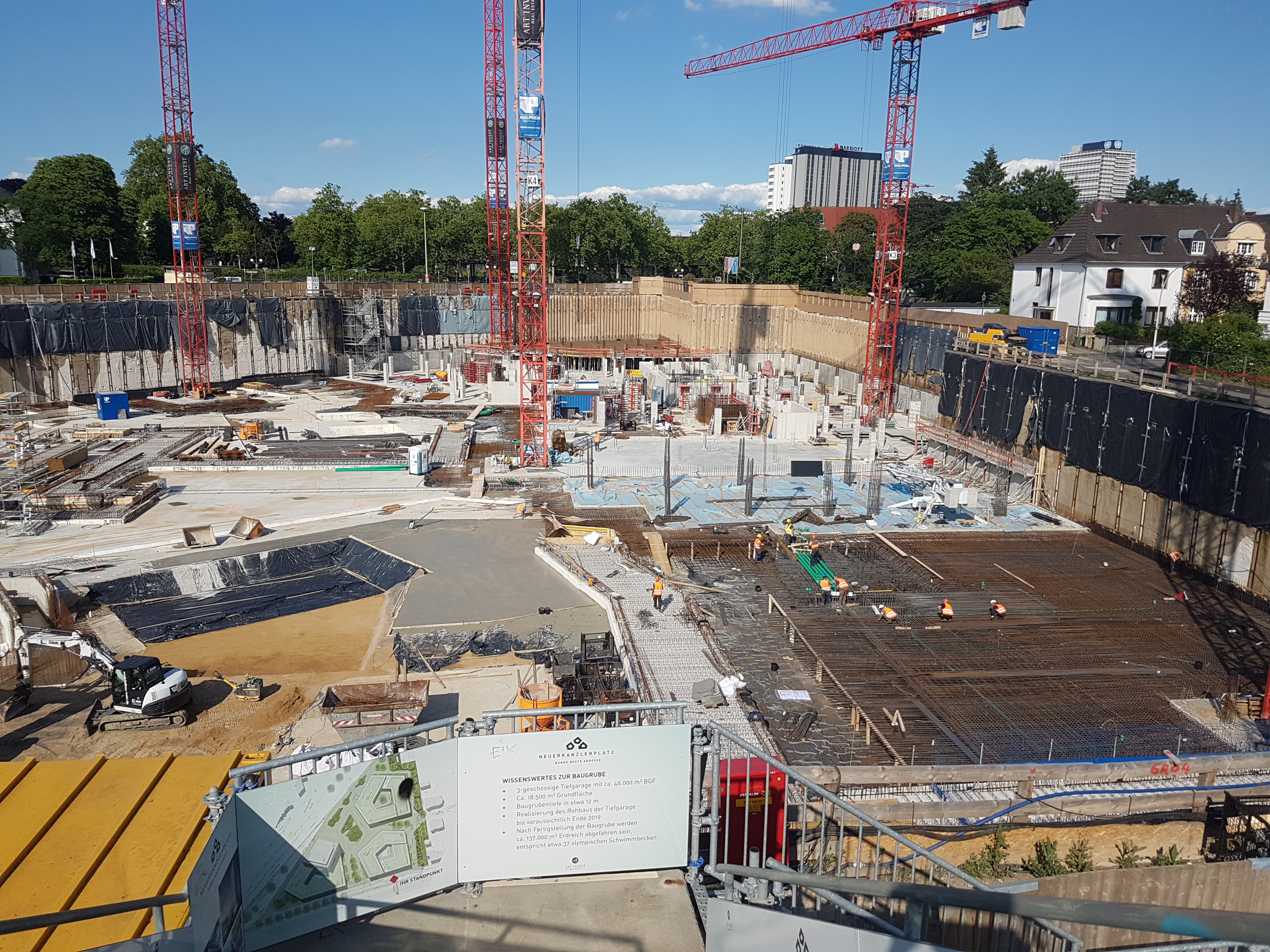
Construction progress on May 29, 2019,

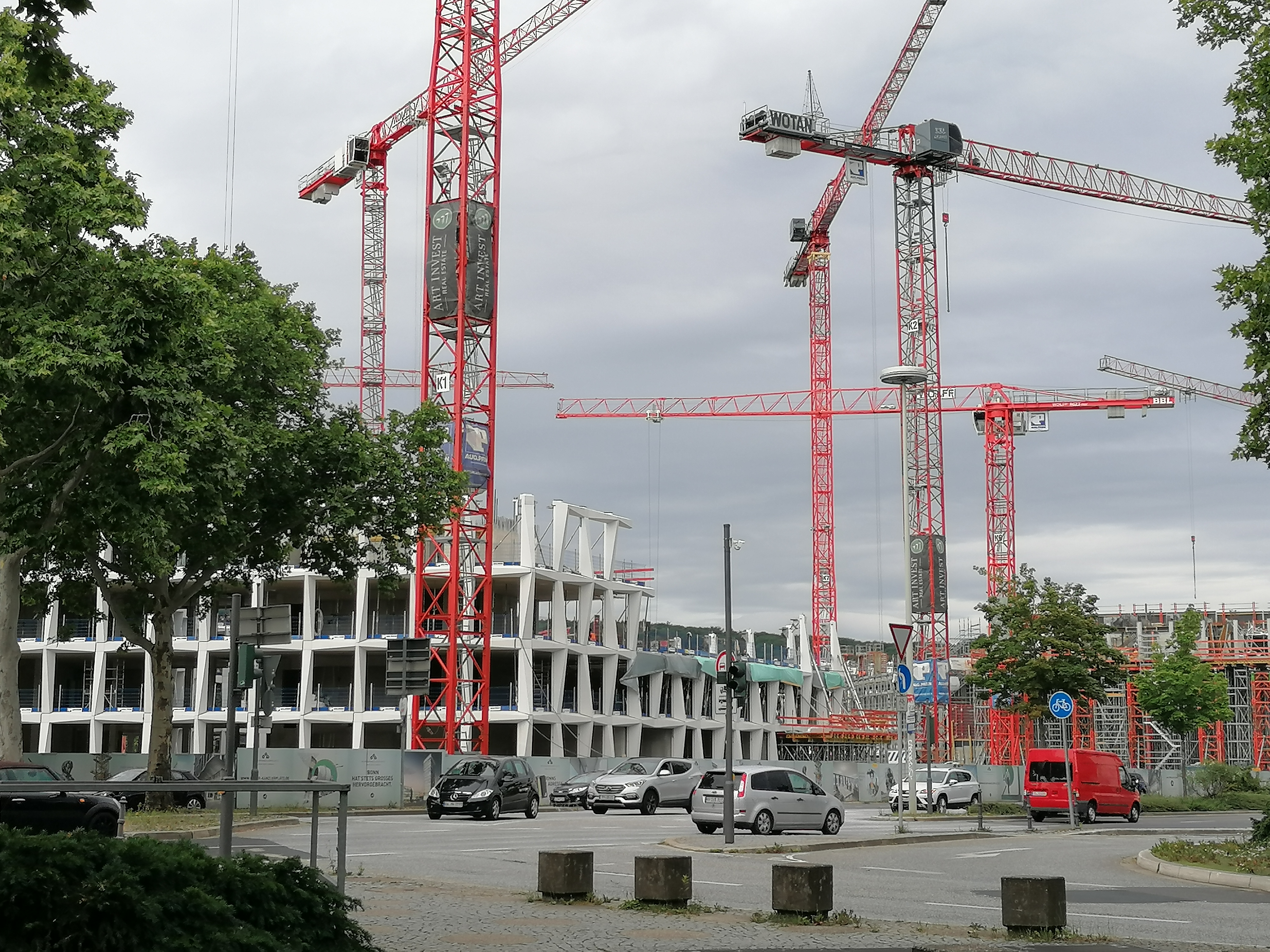
and on July 4, 2020.

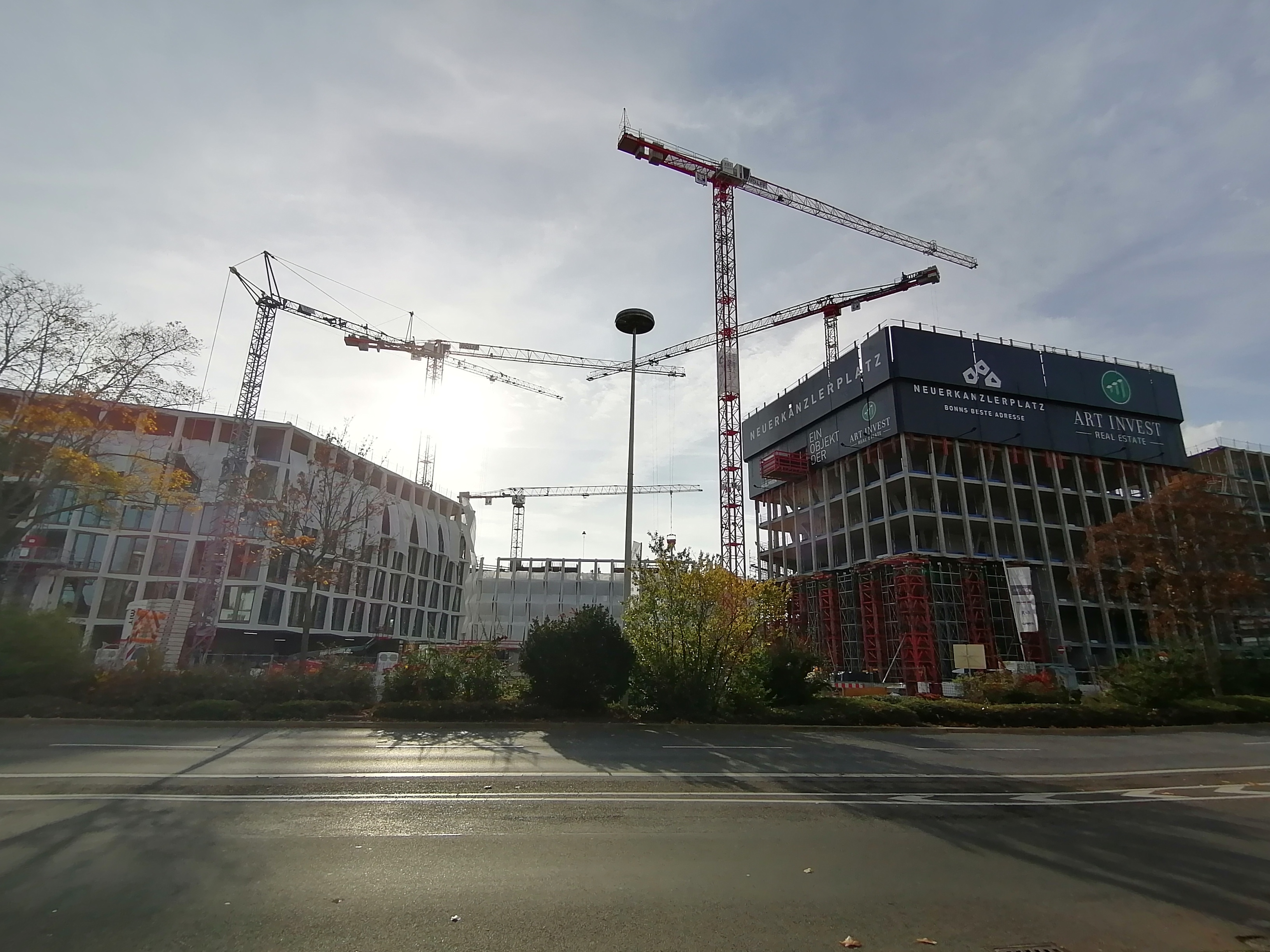
Window elements are already being installed in the outbuildings, November 14, 2020

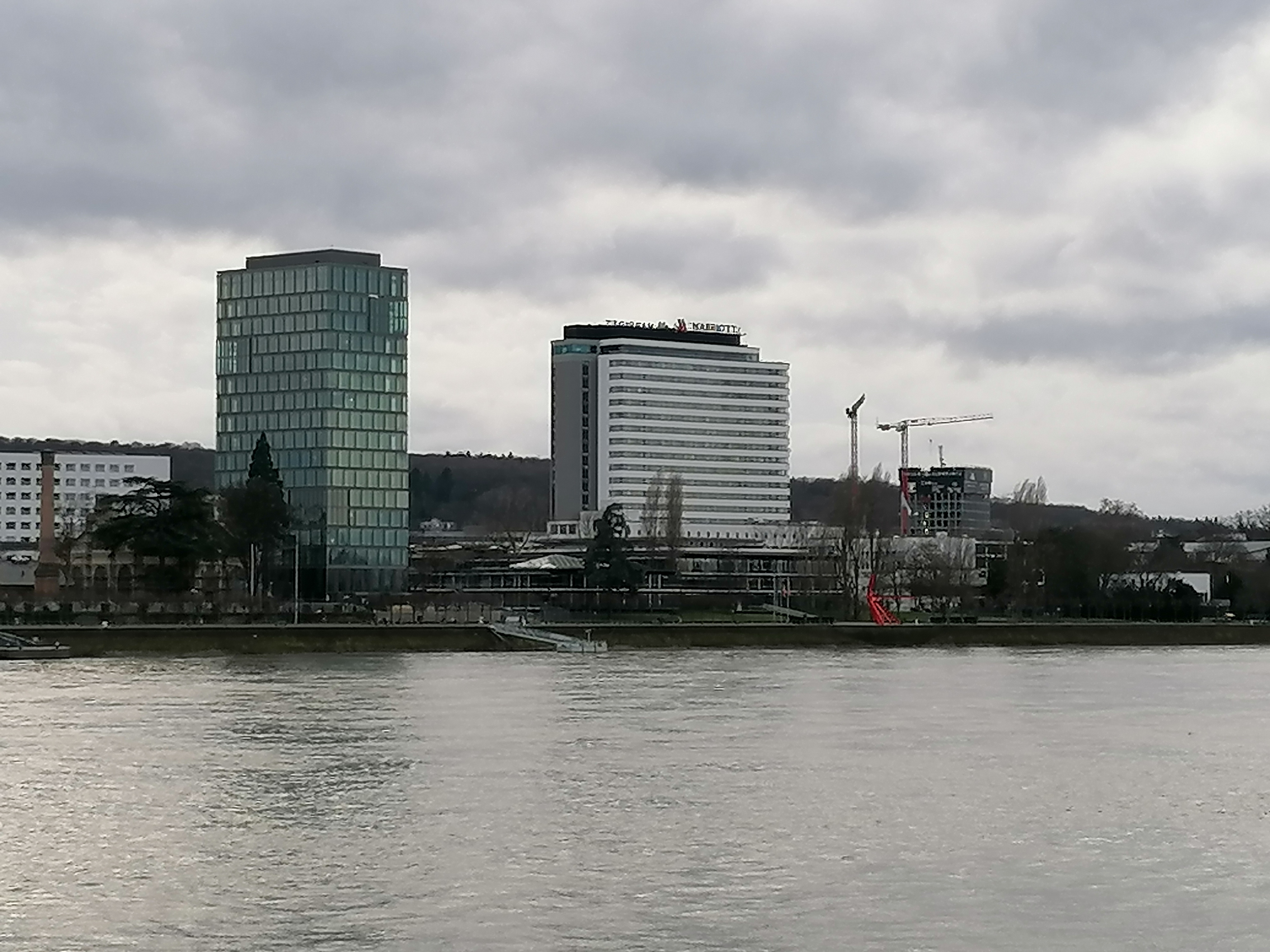
View of the construction site from Beuel, January 21, 2021

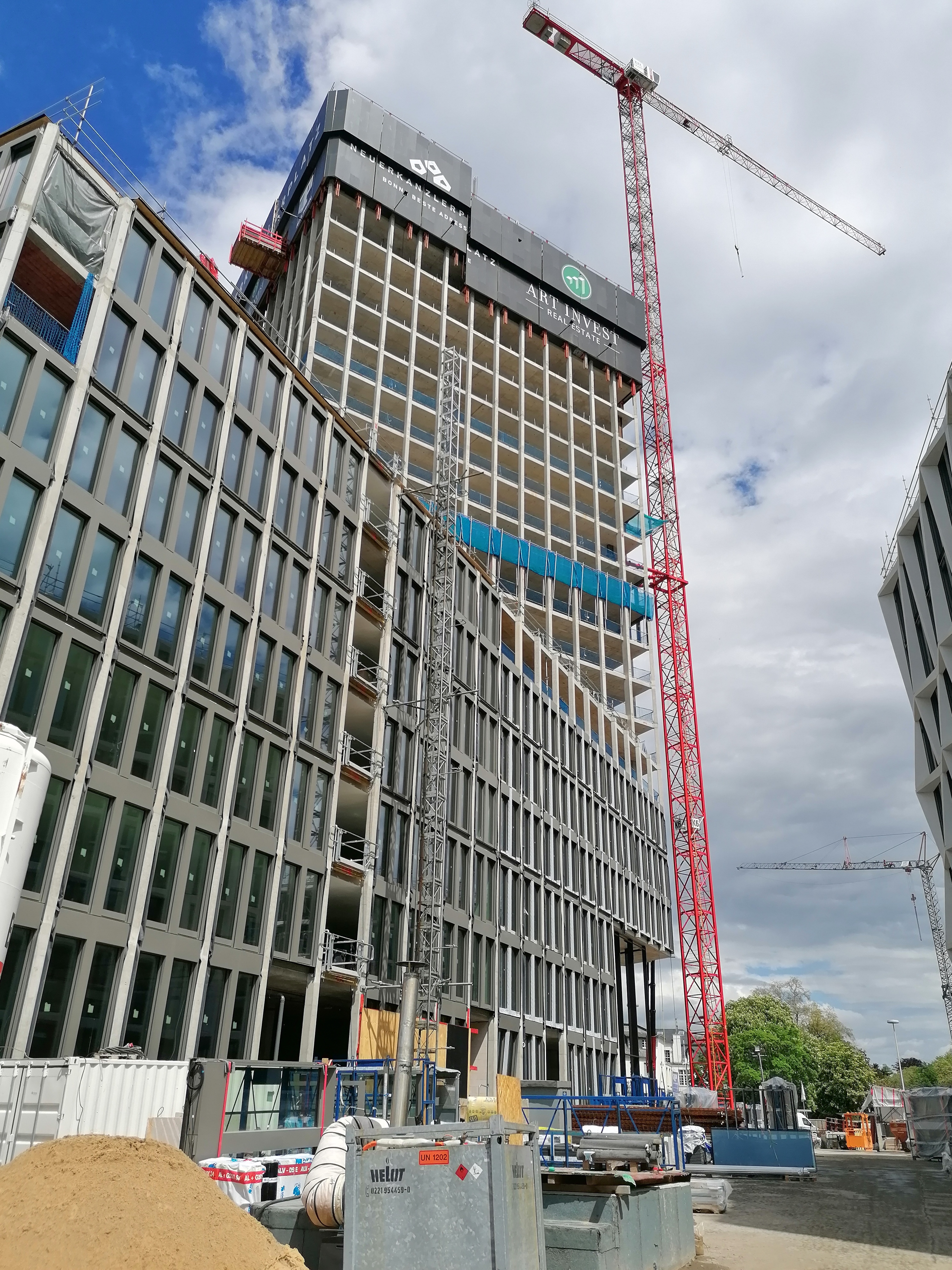
The main tower (Hochhaus am Kanzlerplatz) on May 14, 2021

== See also ==
- List of tallest buildings in Bonn
- List of tallest buildings in Germany
