= Estrel Tower =

Skyscraper under construction in Berlin, Germany

- Construction site in June 2026

General information
- Status: Topped-out
- Location: Sonnenallee 225, Berlin, Germany
- Coordinates: 52.471894°N 13.458407°E
- Construction started: 2021
- Estimated completion: 2026

Height
- Architectural: 176 m (577 ft)

Technical details
- Floor count: 45
- Floor area: 77,500 m^{2} (834,000 sq ft)

Design and construction
- Architecture firm: Barkow Leibinger

The Estrel Tower is a 176 m tall skyscraper topped-out in the Neukölln district of Berlin, Germany. After its completion in 2026 the building will become Berlin's tallest building and Germany's tallest hotel.

== History ==
In 2013 the Estrel Hotel started a competition for the realization of a high-rise next to the existing hotel building located on the Sonnenallee. The competition was won by Barkow Leibinger (founded by Frank Barkow and Regine Leibinger) who proposed a series of triangulated volumes resembling the game of Tangram in response to the existing hotel building and the low-rise surrounding neighbourhoods. The proposal included a skyscraper with a sloped silhouette and a roof terrace oriented to the city.

In December 2017 the borough assembly of Neukölln gave its permission for the project. Ekkehard Streletzki, the owner of the Estrel Hotel, adjusted the plans for the exclusive usage as a hotel building during the COVID-19 pandemic to a mixed usage with 522 hotel rooms and 9,000 m^{2} (97,000 sq ft) of office space.

The construction started in November 2021. The project aims to earn a LEED Platinum certification.

== See also ==
- List of tallest buildings in Berlin
