= List of tallest buildings in Düsseldorf =

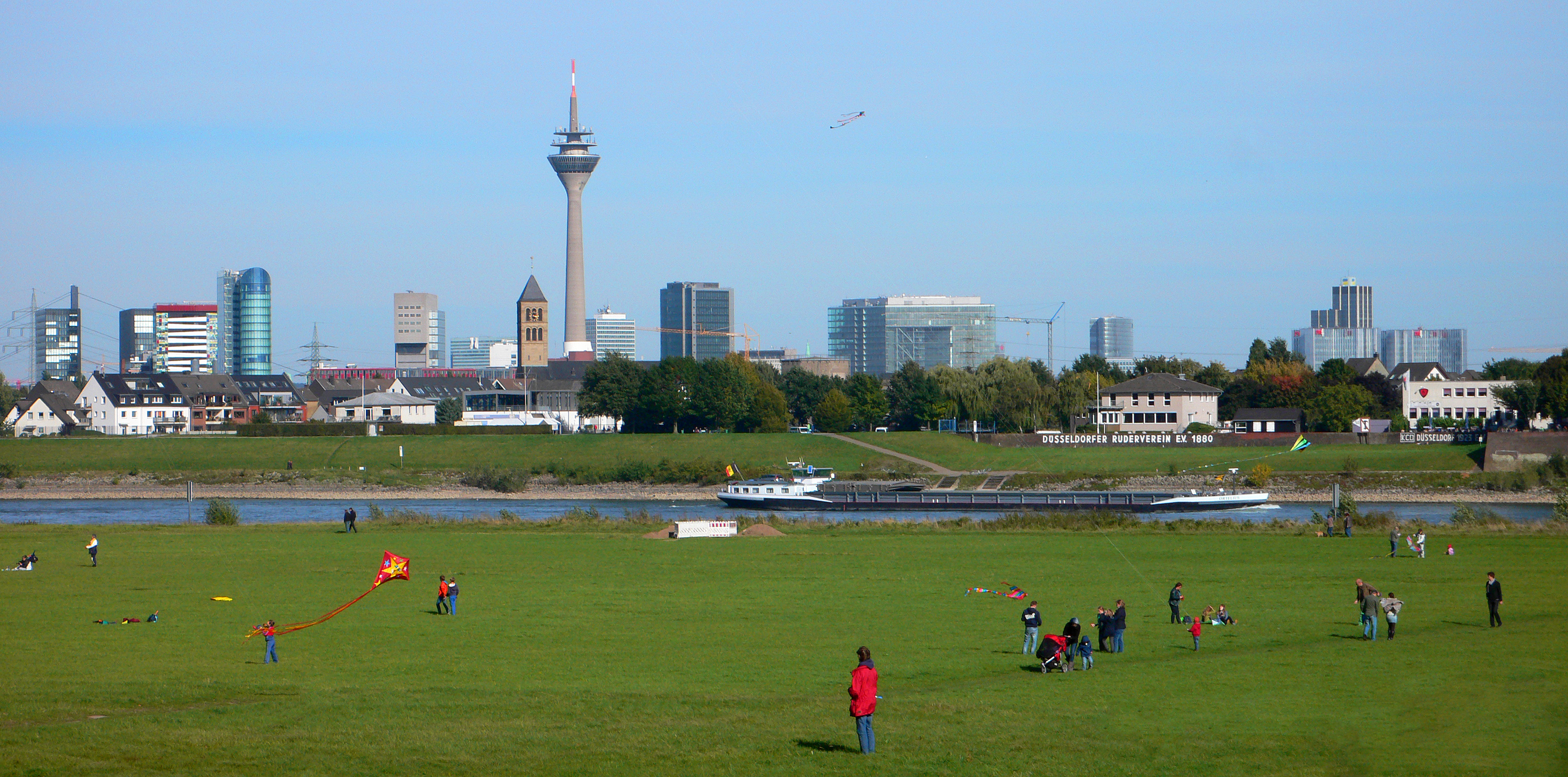
Düsseldorf Panorama

This list of tallest buildings in Düsseldorf ranks high-rise buildings and important landmarks that reach a height of 50 meters (160 feet).

Düsseldorf's history of skyscrapers began 1924 with the completion of the 13-storey, 57-meter-high (187-foot) Wilhelm Marx House. The first building to exceed the 100-meter mark was the LVA-Tower in the Carlstadt district of Düsseldorf, built in 1976. Since then, Düsseldorf has completed 3 high-rise buildings of this height. In recent years, the city has been planning an increasing number of high-rise buildings over 100 metres (330 feet), of which only one has reached the active construction phase so far.

A special landmark on the Düsseldorf skyline is the 240.5-meter-high Rheinturm, a television tower and tallest structure in the city.

Rank	Name	Image	Height m (ft)	Floors	Year completed	Use / Note
	Rheinturm		240.5 m (789 ft)		1981	Telecommunications tower, Tallest structure in Düsseldorf.
	Flehe Bridge		146.47 m (481 ft)		1979	Single tower cable stayed bridge, Tallest pylon of a bridge in Germany.
1	ARAG-Tower		124.9 m (410 ft)	32	2001	Tallest skyscraper in Düsseldorf.
	Rheinkniebrücke		114.1 m (374 ft)		1969	Cable stayed bridge.
2	LVA Hauptgebäude		123 m (404 ft)	29	1976	Headquarters of Deutschen Rentenversicherung Rheinland
3	Victoria Haus		108 m (354 ft)	29	1998	Headquarters of ERGO Group AG
	Oberkasseler Brücke		104 m (341 ft)		1976	Single tower cable stayed bridge.
4	Dreischeibenhaus		94 m (308 ft)	26	1960	Office
5	GAP 15		90 m (295 ft)	24	2005	Office
6	Mannesmann-Hochhaus		89 m (292 ft)	25	1955	Office
7	Sky Office		89 m (292 ft)	23	2009	Tenants are McKinsey & Company and Hogan Lovells International LLP
	Johanneskirche		87.5 m (287 ft)		1881	
	St. Suitbertus (Düsseldorf-Bilk)		80.23 m (263 ft)		1927	
	St. Peter		80 m (262 ft)		1898	
8	SIGN!		76 m (249 ft)	20	2010	Residential
9	Vodafone-Campus		75 m (246 ft)	19	2012	Headquarters of Vodafone
10	Stadttor		75 m (246 ft)	20	1998	Office
11	Landeszentralbank		74 m (243 ft)	26	1987	State central bank
12	Stadtsparkasse Düsseldorf		72 m (236 ft)	19	1964 (refurbished 2000)	
12	IT.NRW		72 m (236 ft)	16	1976	Office
14	Portobello-Haus		70 m (230 ft)	20	2003	Residential
15	White Max		70 m (230 ft)	19	1975 (refurbished 2014)	Residential
16	RKM 740		70 m (230 ft)	19	2021	Residential
	St. Lambertus		70 m (230 ft)		14th century, 1855	The oldest church in Düsseldorf
17	Apollo-Hochhaus		69 m (226 ft)	18	1967	Office
18	Pressehaus Rheinische Post		68 m (223 ft)	14	1991	Headquarters of the Rheinische Post editorial office
19	Media Tower		67 m (220 ft)	19	2005	Office
20	Hafenspitze 1		65 m (213 ft)	19	2010	Hyatt-Hotel
20	Hafenspitze 2		65 m (213 ft)	19	2010	Office
20	25 Hours Hotel		65 m (213 ft)	19	2018	Hotel
23	DOCK		63 m (207 ft)	16	2002	Office
24	Colorium		62 m (203 ft)	18	2001	Office
25	Sternhaus		61 m (200 ft)	18	1972	Residential
25	Lindner Congress Hotel		61 m (200 ft)	19	1974	Hotel
25	Pandion d’Or		61 m (200 ft)	18	2015	Residential
28	Seestern Tower		60 m (197 ft)	15	2002	Office
28	Le Grand		60 m (197 ft)	19	2017	Residential
28	Eclipse		60 m (197 ft)	19	2020	Office
28	Ciel et Terre		60 m (197 ft)	18	2017	Residential
28	L’Oréal Deutschland (Horizon)		60 m (197 ft)	16	2017	Headquarters of L’Oréal Germany
28	Quantum (Duo Tower)		60 m (197 ft)	18	1995 (refurbished 2013)	Office
28	Dreicubenhaus		60 m (197 ft)	18	1970	Office
28	RWI4 I		60 m (197 ft)	14	1974	Office, commercial
28	RWI4 II		60 m (197 ft)	14	1974	Office, commercial
28	MyHive Alto		60 m (197 ft)	16	2024	Office
28	WinWin 1 (South Tower)		60 m (197 ft)	20	2021	Residential
28	WinWin 2 (North Tower)		60 m (197 ft)	20	2021	Residential
40	Stadtverwaltung Düsseldorf		59 m (194 ft)	16	1956	Office, Düsseldorf city administration
41	Ministerium für Kinder, Familie, Flüchtlinge und Integration NRW		58 m (190 ft)	17	1967	Office
41	The Crown		58 m (190 ft)	12	1965 (refurbished 2018)	Hotel, retail
41	Immermann-Tower		58 m (190 ft)	16	1956 (refurbished 2010)	Office
44	Wilhelm Marx House		57 m (187 ft)	13	1924	Offices, theaters, retail, first skyscraper in Düsseldorf
45	Sparda-Bank West		55 m (180 ft)	18	1987	Office
46	Ministerium des Innern des Landes Nordrhein-Westfalen			15		Ministry of the Interior of the State of North Rhine-Westphalia
47	PANDION FRANCIS		53.8 m (177 ft)	14	2020	Office
48	LYGHT Düsseldorf		51 m (167 ft)	14	1979 (refurbished 2024)	Office

== Under construction ==
Name	Height (m)	Height (ft)	Floors	Year
Phönix Tower	120	394	36	On Hold

== Proposed ==
Name	Height (m)	Height (ft)	Floors	Year
New Heart on the Block	120 & 83	394 & 272	29 & 23	2028
Twist	117	384	26	Unknown
Hochhaus am Hauptbahnhof	115	377	31	Unknown
Technisches Rathaus	110	361	30	Unknown
Finanzministerium I	107	351		Unknown
NRW Bank	100	328		Unknown
Finanzministerium II	100	328		Unknown
Hochhaus im Belsenpark	90	295		Unknown

== See also ==
- List of tallest buildings in Germany
- List of tallest structures in Germany
