= Cordone =

Cordone is an Italian surname. Notable people with the surname include:

- Daniel Cordone (born 1974), Argentine footballer
- Davide Cordone (born 1971), Italian footballer
- Roberto Cordone (born 1941), Italian artist and sculptor
