= LVA Hauptgebäude =

Skyscraper in Düsseldorf, Germany

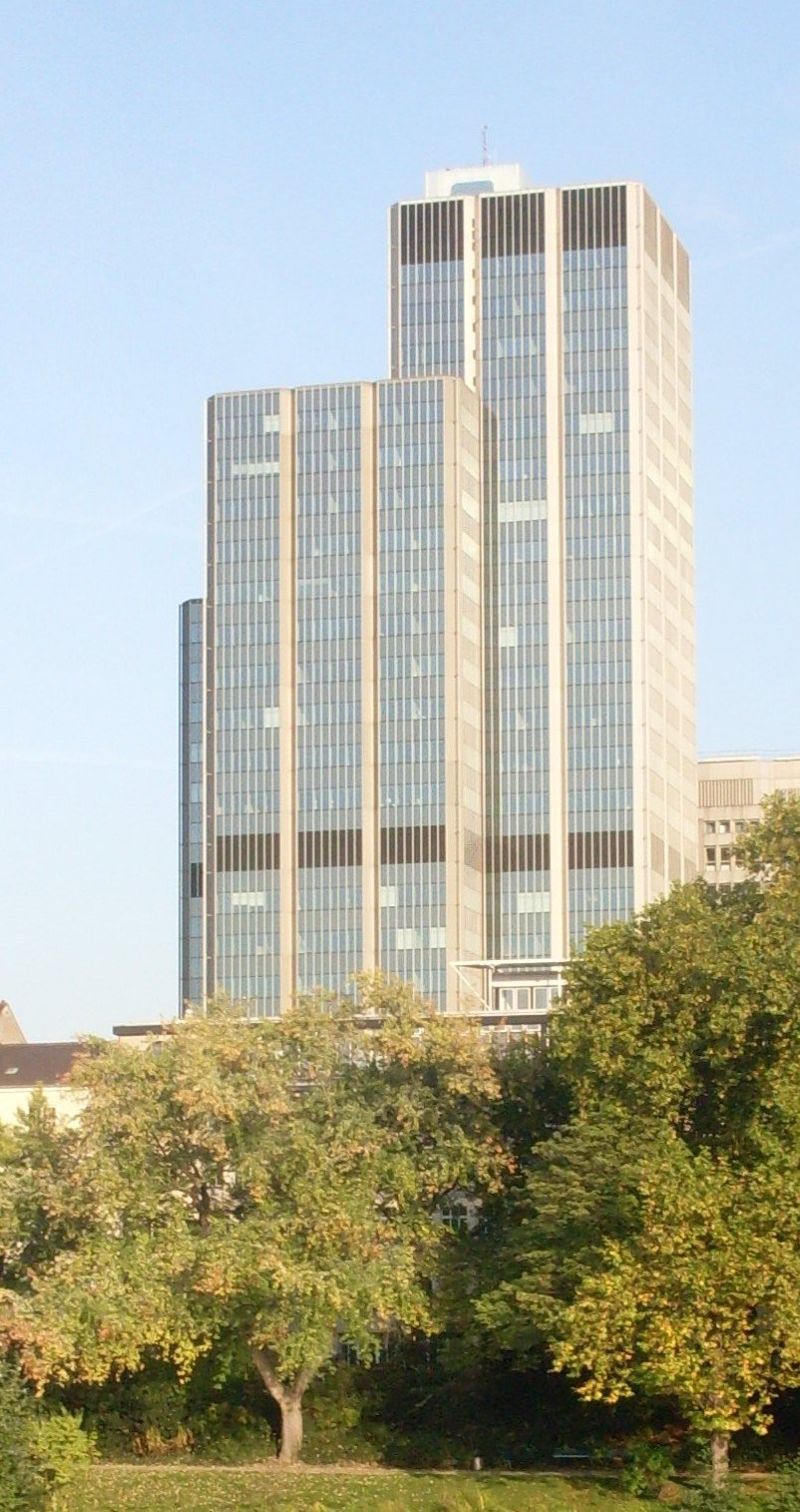
- Interactive map of the LVA Hauptgebäude area

General information
- Status: Completed
- Type: Office
- Location: Düsseldorf, Germany, 8-10 Graf-Adolf-Platz, Düsseldorf, Germany
- Coordinates: 51.21874°N 6.77769°E
- Construction started: 1972
- Completed: 1976

Height
- Roof: 123 m (404 ft)

Technical details
- Structural system: Concrete
- Floor count: 29

Design and construction
- Architect: Harald Deilmann

The LVA Hauptgebäude is a high-rise office building in the Friedrichstadt urban quarter of Düsseldorf, Germany. Built between 1972 and 1976, the tower stands at 123 m (404 ft) tall with 29 floors and is the current second tallest building in Düsseldorf. It was also the tallest in the city between its completion and 2001 when it was surpassed by the Arag-Tower.

== History ==
=== Architecture ===
The building is located between Friedrichstraße, Adersstraße, Königsallee and Luisenstraße in the Düsseldorf district of Friedrichstadt. It is the headquarters of the German Pension Insurance Rhineland, which was formerly called the State Insurance Institute Rhine Province (LVA), which gave rise to the name.

The LVA main building was built between 1972 and 1976. The architect was the Münster based architect Harald Deilmann (1920–2008).

The building was opened in the summer of 1978. At an official height of 123 meters, the building was the tallest building in the city until the completion of the ARAG Tower. The 29 -story building consists of four towers. Tower 1 has a height of 78.43 m and houses 18 floors, Tower 2 is 94.66 m high and has 22 floors. The third tower has 28 floors and a height of 113.56 m. Tower 4 has the dimensions mentioned above because it is the tallest of all four towers.

== See also ==
- List of tallest buildings in Düsseldorf
- List of tallest buildings in Germany

Records
Preceded by Dreischeibenhaus	Tallest building in Düsseldorf; 1976–2001	Succeeded by Arag-Tower
