= Rheinkomet =

Light show on the Rheinturm in Düsseldorf

Coordinates: 51°13′04″N 6°45′42″E

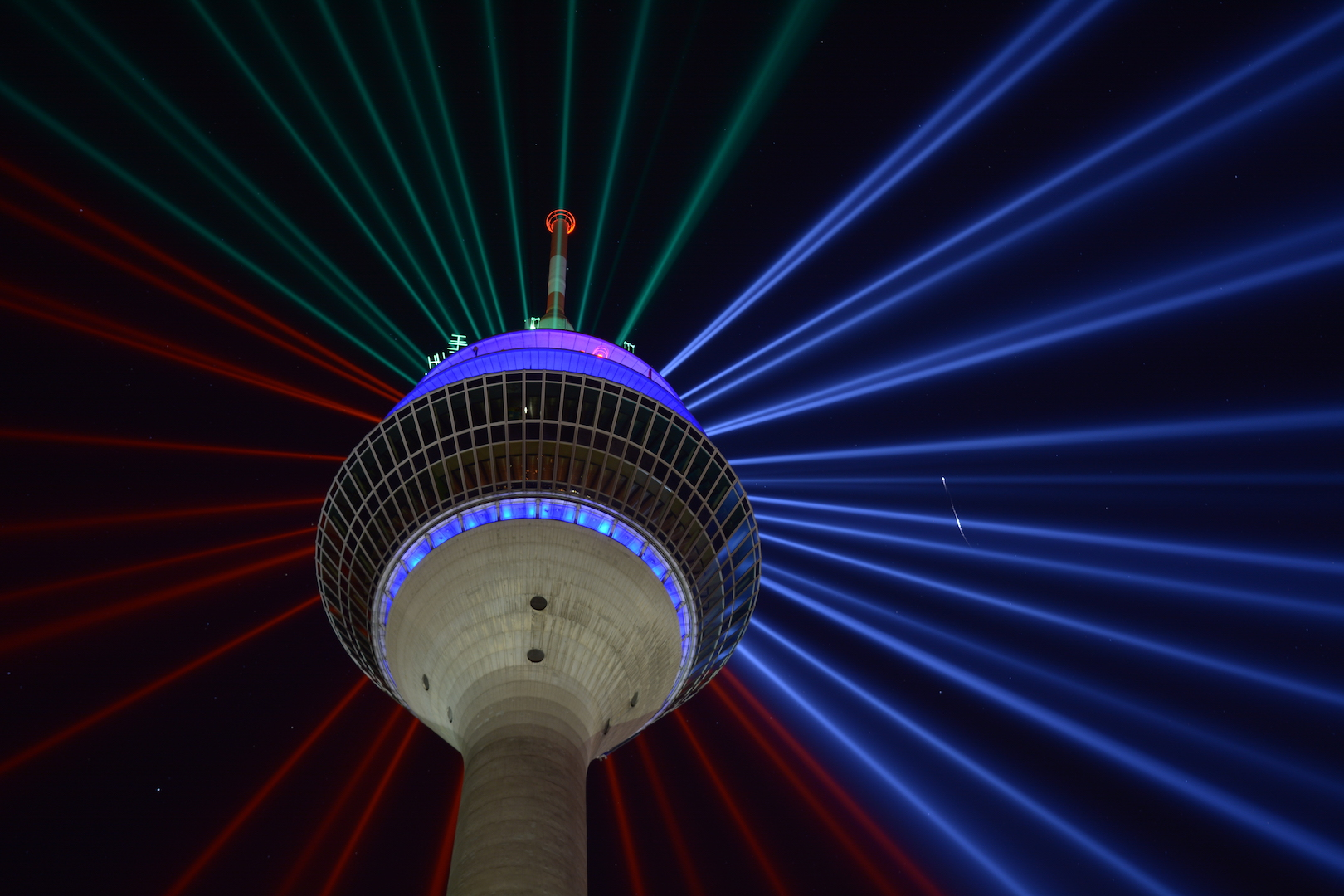
Rheinturm Düsseldorf: Illumination 70-year-anniversary NRW

Rheinkomet (lit. 'Rhine comet') is a light art installation on top of the Rheinturm (Rhine Tower) in Düsseldorf. It was first introduced on the 70th anniversary of the federal state North Rhine-Westphalia in August 2016. It has 56 Xenon arc lamps. It was first intended only for the anniversary. Due to high public popularity, they try to set it up permanently and to use it on special occasions.
