= ARAG SE =

European insurance group

- Type: Societas Europaea(SE)
- Founded: 1935
- Headquarters: Düsseldorf, Germany
- Key people: Renko Dirksen; Matthias Maslaton; Wolfgang Mathmann; Hanno Petersen; Joerg Schwarze; Werenfried Wendler
- Products: Insurance
- Revenue: €2.02 bn (2021)
- Number of employees: 4,700 (2021)

ARAG SE is a European insurance group. ARAG stands for Allgemeine Rechtsschutzversicherungs Aktiengesellschaft. "SE" stands for "Societas Europaea". Its headquarters are located in the ARAG-Tower in Düsseldorf. The ARAG Group employs almost 4,700 people worldwide. The Group reported total gross premium income of €2.02 billion in 2021. ARAG is the largest family-owned German insurance group, with a legal insurance portfolio of 4.7 million policies in the 2021 business year. The Group's international legal insurance business accounts for 2.9 million policies alone, making it the largest legal insurer in the world. The Group's total insurance business was 12.2 million policies in 2021, 8.4 million of which were outside Germany.

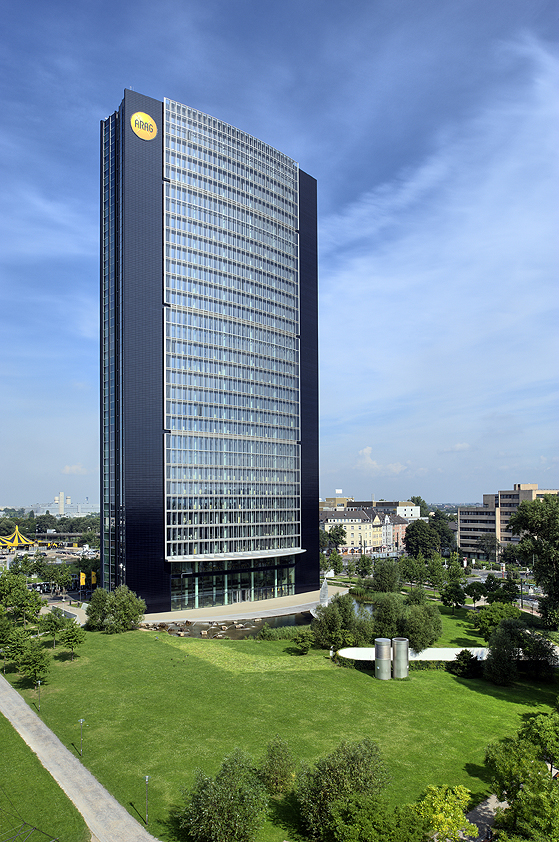
ARAG Group Headquarters in Düsseldorf

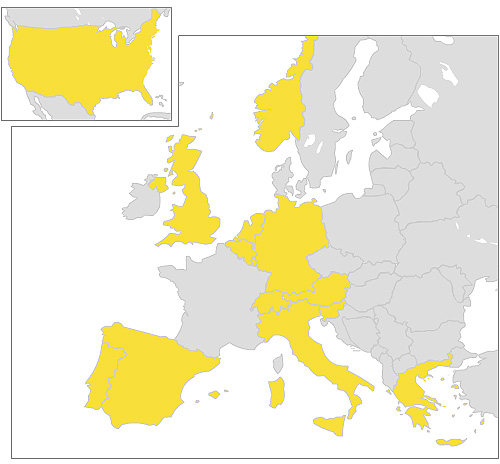
The ARAG Group operates in 15 European countries (Austria, Belgium, Denmark, Germany, Great Britain, Greece, Italy, Luxembourg, the Netherlands, Norway, Portugal, Republic of Ireland, Slovenia, Spain, Sweden, and Switzerland), in Australia, Canada and the United States.

== History ==
The ARAG Group was founded in 1935 as legal insurance company under the name of Deutsche Auto-Rechtsschutz-AG (DARAG) by the Düsseldorf entrepreneur and attorney Heinrich Fassbender. With that venture, Faßbender opened the door to a lucrative field of business. His stated founding principle was as follows: "All citizens should be able to assert their rights, not only those who can afford to do so". Following the expansion of legal insurance beyond the boundaries of straight automotive legal insurance (1949), the company branched out into other segments of the insurance industry in 1962 and began marketing the business concept of legal insurance. The ARAG Group entered the life assurance business in 1965 and issued its first health insurance policies in 1985, having acquired other insurance companies in that segment. These firms are based in Munich, the second German location of the ARAG Group. Other international legal insurance companies have been acquired over the years. The ARAG Group now is active in a total of 19 countries - including the US, Canada and Australia.

In 2001, the Group occupied new corporate headquarters in the ARAG Tower in Düsseldorf, a building designed by Lord Norman Foster and the Düsseldorf firm of RKW Rhode Kellermann Wawrowsky Architektur + Städtebau. The Group has been an active sponsor of numerous clubs and associations, primarily in Düsseldorf, for many years.

== Structure of the ARAG Group ==
ARAG Allgemeine Rechtsschutz-Versicherungs-AG is the operational management company for the Group and manages the legal insurance business in Germany and abroad. The composite and health insurance lines are managed by separate insurance companies. Paul-Otto Faßbender is the majority shareholder in the ARAG Group. Between 2000 and July 2020, he was Chairman of the Management Board and responsible for central Group functions. Renko Dirksen replaced him in that position in July 2020. He is supported by Management Board members Matthias Maslaton, Wolfgang Mathmann, Hanno Petersen, Joerg Schwarze, and Werenfried Wendler. Paul-Otto Faßbender was elected by the Supervisory Board of ARAG SE as its Chairman in July 2020.

== North American history ==
In the United States, ARAG USA was originally founded in 1973 as a division of Midwest Mutual Insurance Company and began creating, marketing and administering a new group legal product. In 1989, ARAG purchased the organization and created ARAG Insurance Company.

In 2016 ARAG entered the Canadian market as an insurance intermediary. Since then, ARAG Canada has grown, not least through the purchase of DAS's Canadian operations in 2021 with premiums under management of €18.9 million.

== ARAG Legal Services UK ==
ARAG UK was founded in 2006 as an intermediary covering the entire value chain - from product development and sales to marketing and underwriting. 3 of its founding managers still work in the business; Tony Buss as Managing Director, David Haynes as Underwriting and Product Director and Andy Talbot as Head of Sales & Marketing. It has grown since into a company of over 150 employees and premiums under management of £50m. On the day of its launch, ARAG announced that it had secured the business portfolio of ULR Knebworth. In early 2009, ARAG acquired the legal expenses portfolio of Capita shortly after acquiring ATE Ltd, a specialist after-the-event provider. ARAG UK provides a range of before-the-event and after-the-event legal insurance products and services.

== ARAG in Australia ==
End 2019, ARAG launched business operations in Australia. ARAG Services Australia Pty Ltd operates as Underwriting Agency and offers legal expense insurance products targeting insurance brokers and other intermediaries. The product range comprises both commercial and private legal expense insurance products as well as landlord and Web legal expense insurance.
