= Roberto Cordone =

Italian artist and sculptor

Roberto Cordone (born 11 April 1941 in Vallecrosia, Liguria) is an Italian artist and sculptor. He has spent most of his career in Cologne, Germany. His signature work, the monumental sculpture, Movimento Ellissoidale (2001), made of aluminium alloy, stands in front of the ARAG-Tower in Düsseldorf, designed by Sir Norman Foster.

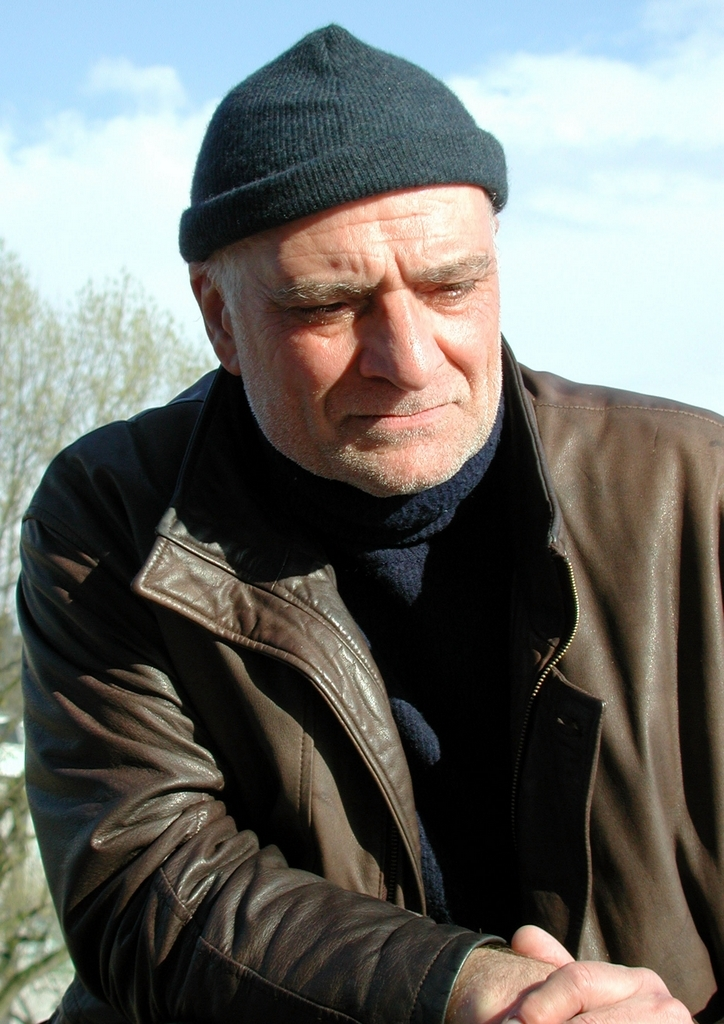
Roberto Cordone (2001)

== Life ==
Cordone received his artistic training from the painter Enzo Maiolino in Bordighera, Italy. In 1960, he emigrated to Cologne, Germany and increasingly shifted his focus to sculpture. Since 1966, he has participated in solo and group exhibitions in German and Italian museums and galleries. His commissions for large-scale works are found in many public places in Germany. In 1969, he received the German award ars viva. Cordone has a large number of sculptures in museums, including the Museum Ludwig in Cologne and Museum Kunstpalast in Düsseldorf, and the Galleria Nazionale d'Arte Moderna, Rome. Cordone is an elected member of the Accademia Tiberina in Rome. Today, he lives with his wife in Cologne, Germany.

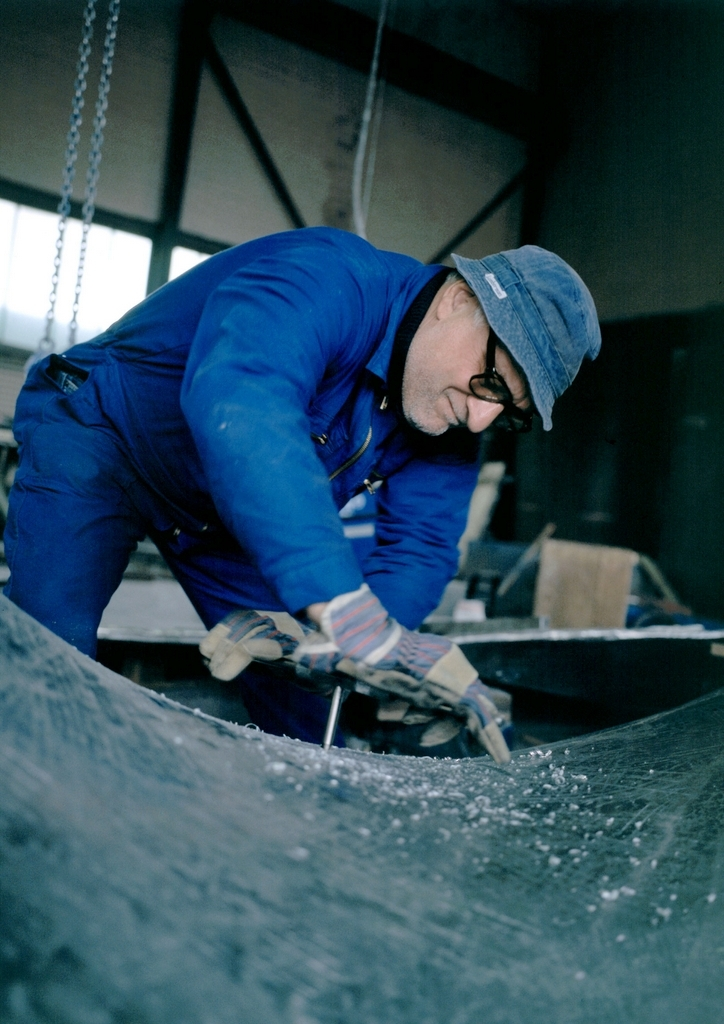
Roberto Cordone at work on Movimento Ellissoidale (2001)

== Work ==
Cordone's work consists mostly of abstract sculptures of bronze, stainless steel, and alloys of titanium and aluminum. His early works are linked to the tradition of the classical modernism of the 20th century, which deemphasizes representation in favor of the abstract. Cordone seeks new content in abstract sculptures. The art historian Uta Gerlach-Laxner stated that his work evolved to often suggest associations with the sensory-organic world, forming a "symbiosis of the organically grown and the technically constructed." According to the art historian Hans Ost, Cordone succeeds in creating “a higher nature,” introducing the viewer to a “new world of visual and spiritual experience.”

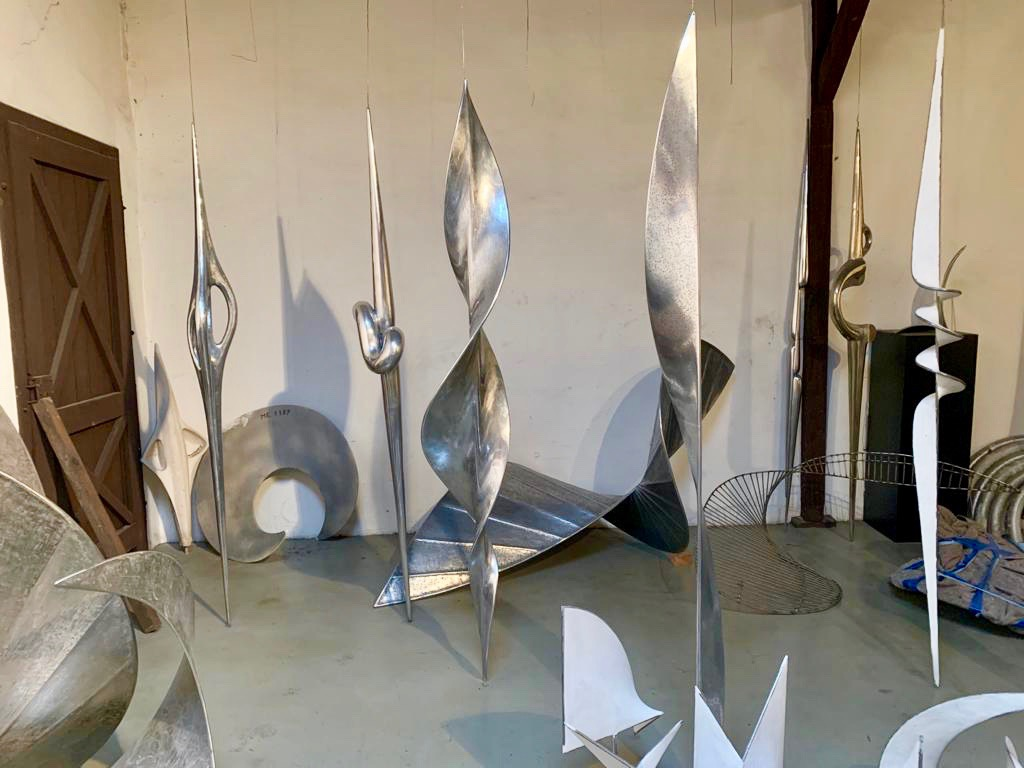
Roberto Cordone Perpendicolari in his studio in Cologne

A distinctive characteristic of many of his sculptures flows from his specific use of hard-to-cast alloys and intense workmanship with these materials to reflect light. His technique, which required him to expand his expertise in metalworking, grew from the realization that “light-reflections could be used to substitute for many of the lines and contours” in a sculpture.

== Perpendicolari ==
His Perpendicolari sculptures, first developed in the middle of the 1960s, were a "step from the figurative to the abstract, and at the same time, a breakthrough to artistic autonomy." The life-size Perpendicolari works are slender metal sculptures of vertical axiality, free of a pedestal and imperceptibly attached to the ceiling by thin wires. They only lightly touch the ground and can be subtly twisted by the slightest impact so that they seem to float. Movement and apparent weightlessness become the characteristic of Cordone's artistic expression. “In spite of what are enormous weights,” according to the German art critic Walter Vitt, Cordone achieves a property that might be described as “making light of the heavy.” With their form related to "human dimensions and proportions," according to Ost, "the Perpendiculari seem to float in space, weightless like a dancer, propelling himself into the air.”

== Vertikali ==
The Vertikali sculptures were conceived for the outdoors, anchored to the earth, often in correspondence with the surrounding architecture. They are stainless steel sculptures, larger than life, built by using segments of cylinders and spheres welded together in symmetrical or asymmetrical relationships.

Because of their highly polished, reflective metal surfaces, these sculptures reflect the surrounding environment and architecture and are in a constant process of change.

== Componibili ==
The original sculptures Componibili of 1972 and 1973 were made from a special industrial polyurethane and based on the tetrahedral model of the carbon atom. They could be set up in a variety of ways, becoming ever new forms. A further development, which originated from the middle element of the Componibili, is the sculpture Cyclopentan (1973). It is now in the Bayer collection and was exhibited in 2013 in the Martin-Gropius-Bau in Berlin.

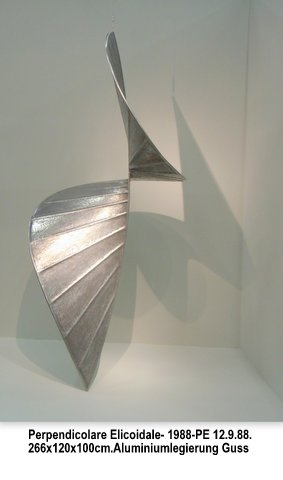
Perpendicolare Elicoidale (1988) at Art Cologne, 2014

These sculptures recently celebrated their 50th anniversary with an exhibition in Cologne..

== Velari ==
The Velari group of sculptures evolved from the Perpendicolari sculptures. The Velari are also designed axially with no pedestal but with less volume and leaned against a wall, moved in space, or positioned as desired. Their shape is reminiscent of the wave-like movement of sails in the wind.

== Elicoidali ==
The Elicoidali sculptures are the "logical result of long artistic work” from the single vertical axial Perpendiculari to sculptures able to freely move in a room, changing their axis as they move. No longer suspended or standing in a fixed place, the Elicoidali represent a "new design principle and a remarkable breadth of variation" in the inventory of forms. They appear to constantly change shape as they move. By reducing their plastic volume, they receive an optical lightness despite the heaviness and hardness of the material, which seem to make them independent of the laws of gravity. According to Vitt, Cordone “succeeds in dematerializing the mass of these sculptures to a high degree.” As the Elicoidali are rolled, their edges form a continuous helicoid, or spiral, on the surface, whereby the three-dimensional sculptures appear projected on a plane.

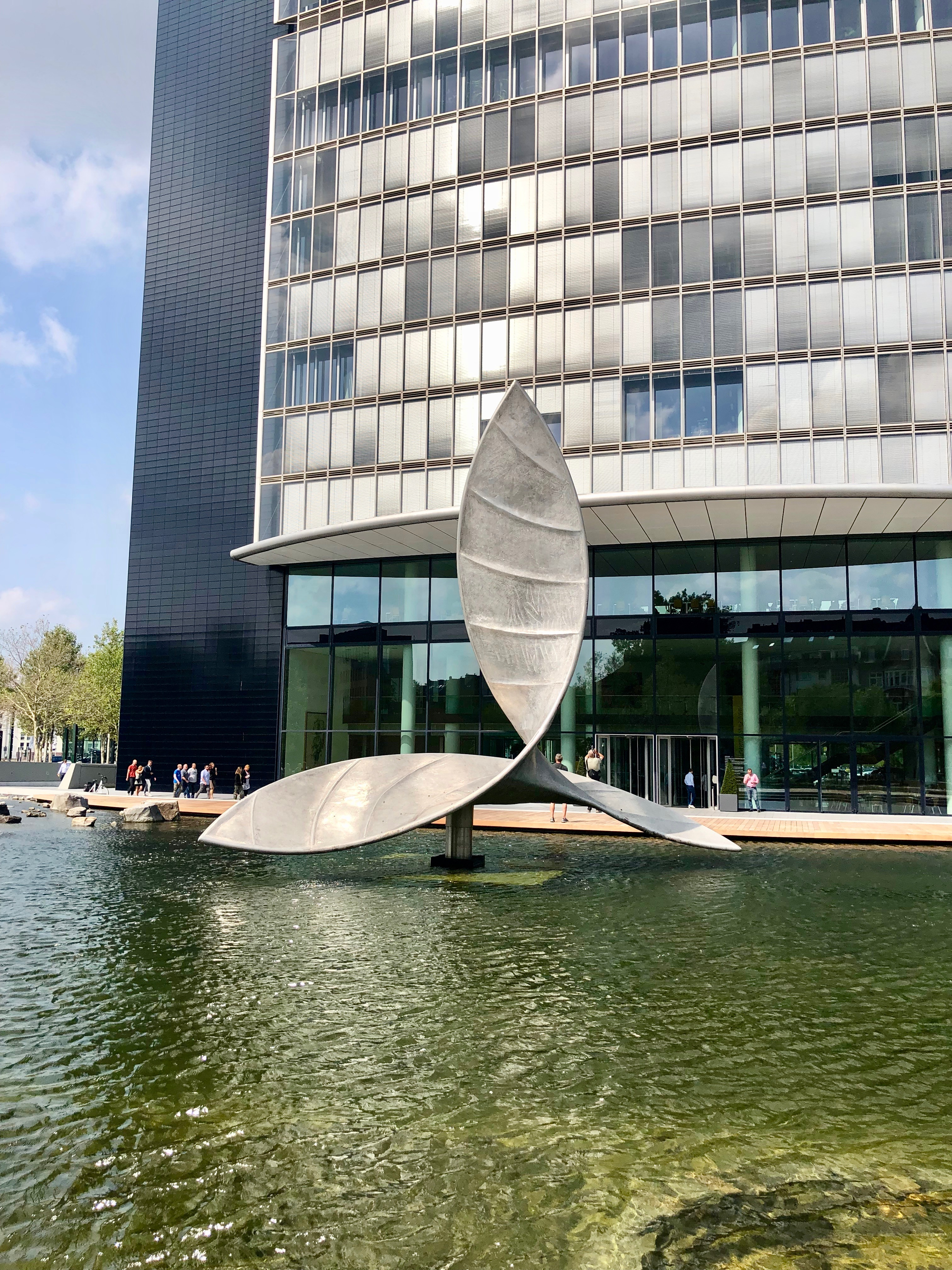
Movimento Ellissoidale (2001) in front of the ARAG-Tower in Düsseldorf

== Sculpture and Dance ==
In the 1993 German television production Sculpture and Dance: Heavy Metal and Light Steps, the Elicoidali and the Perpendicolari were brought together on the stage with a professional ballet company. The dancers moved and intertwined themselves with these sculptures. The art historian Eduard Trier characterized Cordone's work as “sculptural beings.” The Elicoidali and the Perpendicolari acted as equal ballet figures on stage and merged with the artistic movement of ballet dancers to form a total work of art. In the course of the development of the sculptural ballets, Cordone also created photographic canvases of the interaction of the dancers and the sculptures.

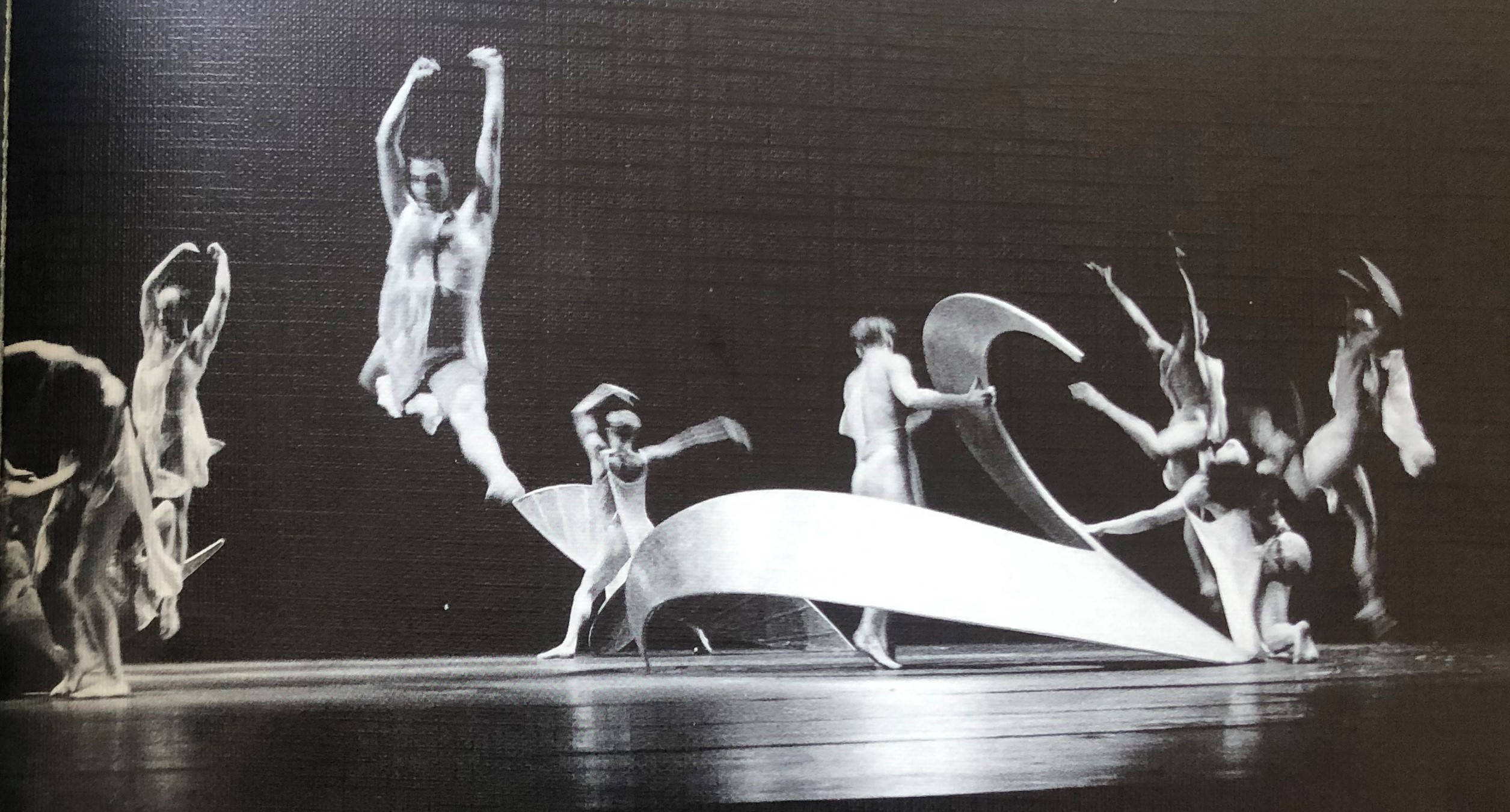
Cordone Sculpture and Dance

== Ellissoidale ==
In 2001, Cordone designed a large-scale, outdoor monumental sculpture Movimento Ellissoidale, which stands in shallow water in front of the ARAG Tower in Düsseldorf. Made from an alloy of aluminum and titanium, its high sail-like vertical form creates a five-ton wind-kinetic sculpture. An offset center of gravity, with an "inner pivot and self-aligning bearings, as used in shafts driven by a ship’s propeller, allows the large sculpture to maneuver freely like a sailing ship.” Whether large gusts or gentle winds, the sculpture nautically corrects “in the wind."
