= Victoria Haus =

Skyscraper in Düsseldorf, Germany

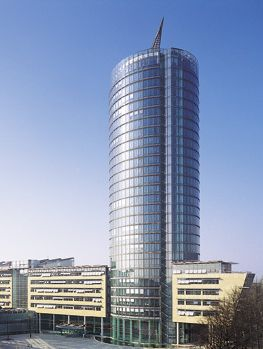
- Interactive map of the Victoria Haus area

General information
- Status: Completed
- Type: Office
- Location: Düsseldorf, Germany, 1 Ergo-Platz, Düsseldorf, Germany
- Coordinates: 51.23693°N 6.77493°E
- Construction started: 1994
- Completed: 1998
- Owner: Victoria-Versicherung

Height
- Roof: 108 m (354 ft)

Technical details
- Structural system: Concrete
- Floor count: 29
- Floor area: 106,600 m^{2} (1,150,000 sq ft)
- Lifts/elevators: Schindler

Design and construction
- Architects: Hentrich-Petschnigg & Partner
- Structural engineer: Prinz & Pott Ingenieurbüro

The Victoria Haus also known as the Victoria Versicherung AG is a high-rise office building in the Pempelfort district of Düsseldorf, Germany. Built between 1994 and 1998, the tower stands at 108 m (354 ft) tall with 29 floors and is the current third tallest building in Düsseldorf.

== History ==
=== Architecture ===
The building is located at the ERGO-Platz in the Düsseldorf district of Pempelfort. It currently serves as the headquarters of the German insurance company Ergo Group, which has its headquarters there and in the adjacent annex buildings.

The building was designed by the German architectural firm of HPP Hentrich-Petschnigg & Partner KG and built between 1994 and 1998. At 108 metres, the Victoria House is the third tallest building in the city after the ARAG Tower and the LVA Tower. Around 1,915 employees work on the 29 floors with a gross usable commercial area of 106,600 m^{2} (1,150,000 sq ft). The building also has an underground car park with around 450 parking spaces.

After the Victoria brand was absorbed into Ergo in 2010, the new name Ergo-Turm became established in everyday language and has since been used in many journalistic sources. In 2001, a new extension was funded by main tennant Victoria Insurance and completed by the Ropertz & Partner firm, serving as an architectural landmark that defines the urban landscape.

== See also ==
- List of tallest buildings in Düsseldorf
- List of tallest buildings in Germany
