= Horst H. Baumann =

German architect (1934–2019)

- Born: 19 June 1934; Aachen, Nazi Germany
- Died: 24 May 2019 (aged 84)
- Occupation: Architect

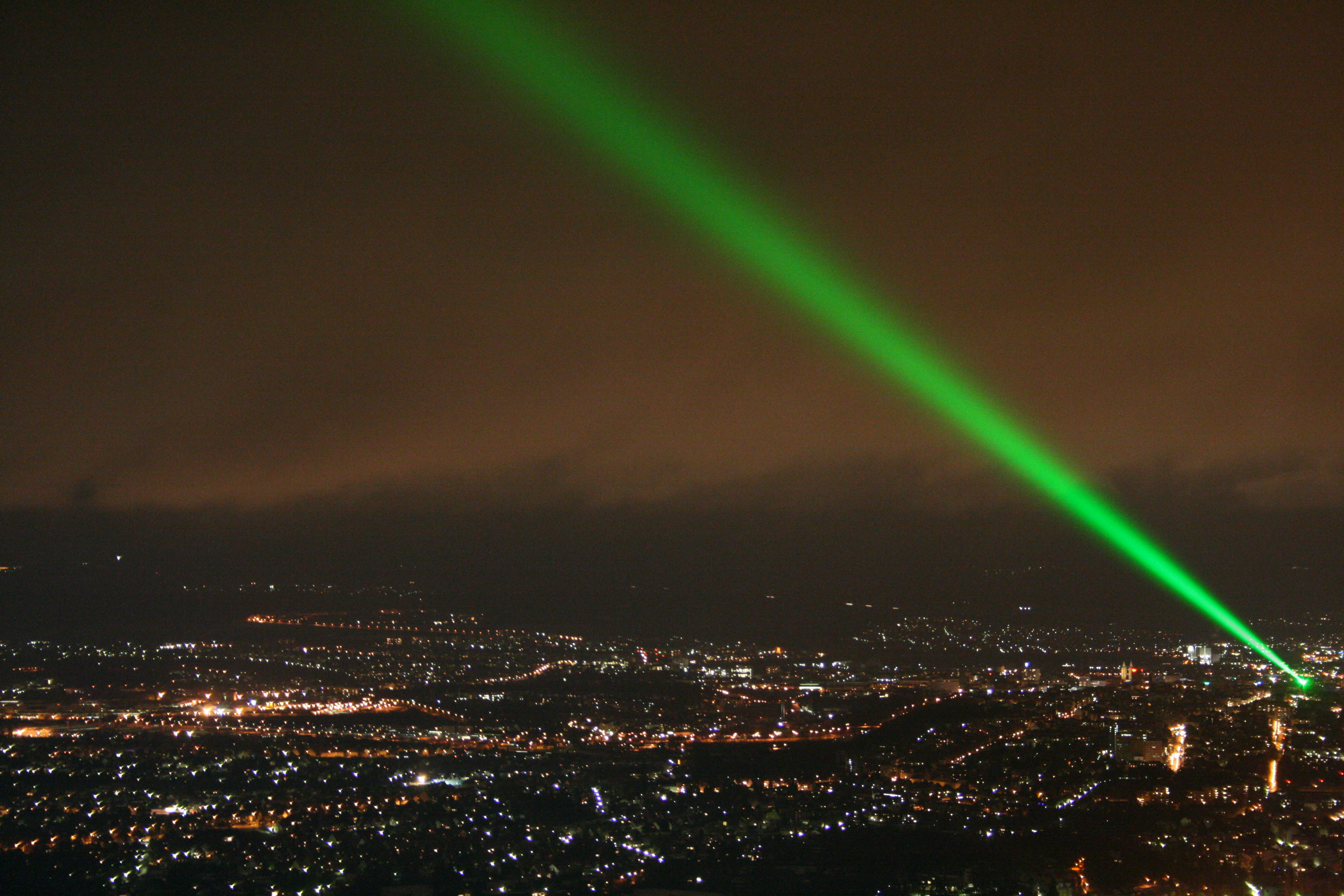
Laserscape Kassel

Horst H. Baumann (19 June 1934 Aachen – 24 May 2019) was a German architect, designer, light artist, and photographer. He was best known for designing Rheinturm Düsseldorf, in Düsseldorf, Germany.

== Life ==
He studied metallurgical engineering from 1954 to 1957 and from 1972 to 1974 at the RWTH Aachen, and from 1994 to 2004 at the Heinrich-Heine University in Düsseldorf. He worked as a photographer and designer from 1957 to 2019, and from 1966 to 2019 as a lighting artist. In 1963–1964, he was a visiting lecturer at the Hochschule für Gestaltung in Ulm. In 1977, he took part in documenta 6 in Kassel, where he installed, with Peter Hertha, the first permanent laser sculpture in the world.

Other installations include the Rheinturm in Düsseldorf (1982), the Neonskulptur "Pass the Cross" in Bielefeld-Sennestadt (1988), and the light remodeled at the Rheinturm Düsseldorf 2003.

His work has been shown internationally, including in the Museum of Modern Art, in New York City in 1965, and in 1967 and 1969 in the Biennale des Jeunes in Paris.

== Death ==
He died on 24 May 2019, aged 84.
