= Dreischeibenhaus =

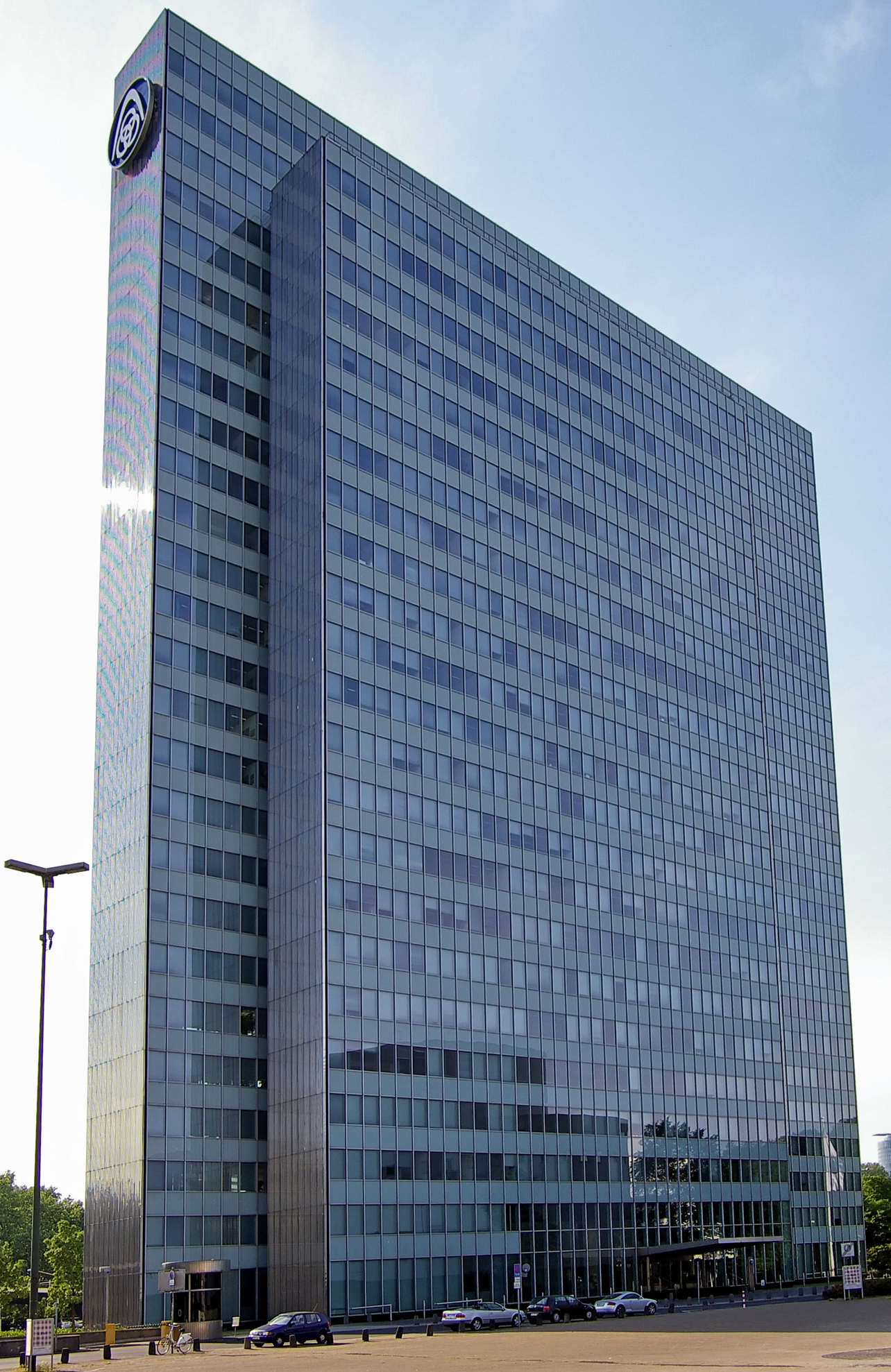

- Location within Germany

General information
- Type: Commercial offices
- Architectural style: International
- Location: Düsseldorf, Germany
- Coordinates: 51°13′40″N 6°46′56″E
- Construction started: 1957
- Completed: 1960
- Owner: Momeni Projektentwicklung GmbH

Height
- Roof: 95 m (312 ft)

Technical details
- Floor count: 25
- Floor area: 33,700 m^{2} (362,700 sq ft)

Design and construction
- Architects: Hentrich, Petschnigg & Partner (Helmut Hentrich, Hubert Petschnigg)

The Dreischeibenhaus (English: "Three plates building", also known as the Dreischeibenhochhaus) is a 95-metre office building in August-Thyssen-Straße in the Hofgarten district of the Düsseldorf city centre. It was also known as the Thyssenhaus or Thyssen-Hochhaus owing to its former use as the headquarters of the Thyssen and ThyssenKrupp groups. It is among the most significant examples of post-war modernist International style and a symbol of the so-called Wirtschaftswunder, or 'economic miracle' of post-war Germany, and contrasts with the neighbouring Düsseldorfer Schauspielhaus on Gustaf-Gründgens-Platz. Dreischeibenhaus, The "Three Plates Building" (a rough translation of its name in German), was one of the first skyscrapers to be completed in Germany after WW2.

In the early 1990s the building was completely refurbished including a new curtain wall matching the appearance of the original, but with improved thermal performance and moisture control.

After another complete renovation under the direction of Düsseldorf HPP Architects in 2013, the skyscraper now offers 35,000 m^{2} of gross floor area.

== Notes ==
Records
Preceded by Mannesmann-Hochhaus	Tallest building in Düsseldorf; 1960–1976	Succeeded by LVA Hauptgebäude
