= Wilhelm Marx House =

Building in Dusseldorf

Coordinates: 51°13′30″N 6°46′36″E

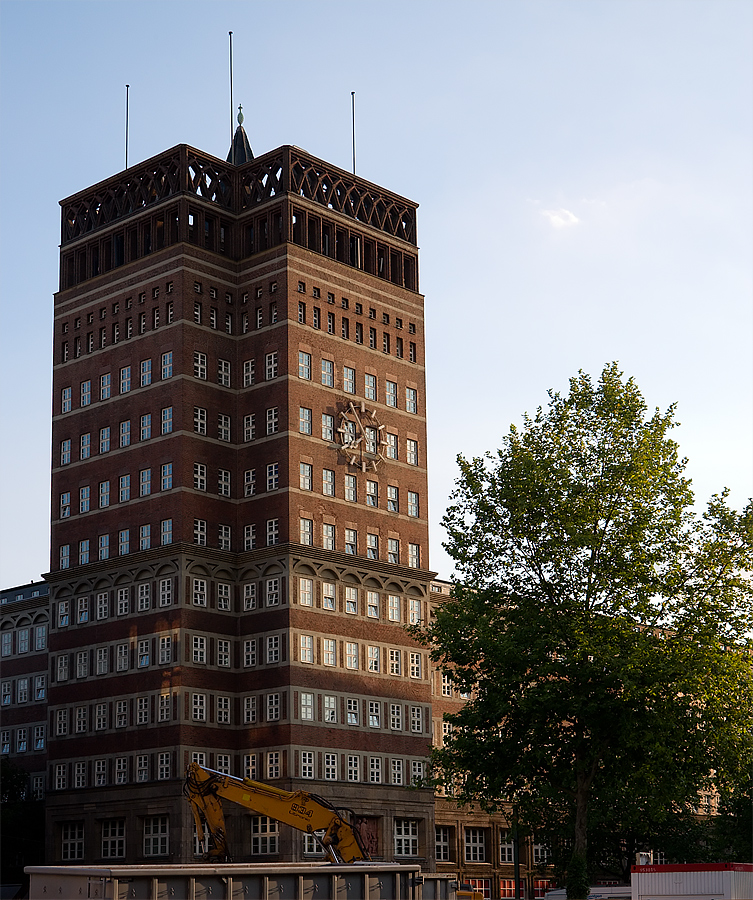
Wilhelm Marx House

Wilhelm Marx House (Wilhelm-Marx-Haus) is a historical high-rise building in the central district of Düsseldorf in Germany. It was one of the first highrise buildings in Germany.

Wilhelm Marx House was finished in 1924 (beginning of the construction was in 1922) and was one of the first high-rise buildings in Europe. It is 57 meters high and has 13 floors above ground level. The architect was Wilhelm Kreis.

It was named after Wilhelm Marx, who was mayor of Düsseldorf in the early 20th century and started a programme for the modernisation of the city in that time. He is not to be confused with the German Chancellor with the same name.

The building was renovated in the 1990s.

Wilhelm Marx House was previously home of the Düsseldorf Stock Exchange and presently includes a theatre, called "JuTA" ("Junges Theater in der Altstadt", or "Young Theatre in the Old Town").
