= Rheinturm =

Telecommunications tower in Germany

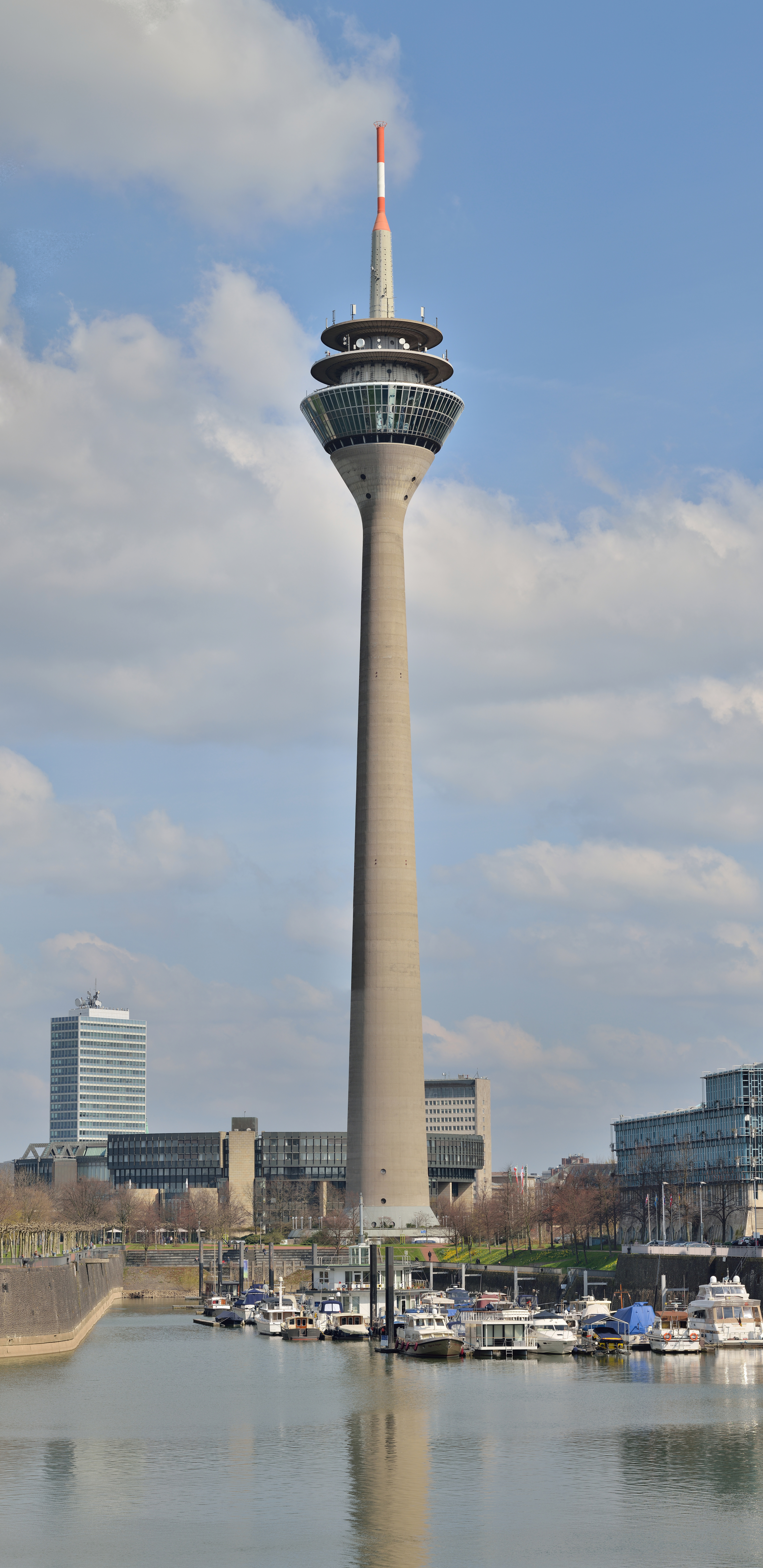
- Rheinturm and Media Harbour
- Interactive map of the Rheinturm area

General information
- Type: Telecommunications tower with restaurant and observation deck
- Location: Düsseldorf, Germany
- Coordinates: 51°13′04″N 6°45′42″E
- Elevation: 36.6 metres NHN
- Construction started: 20 January 1979
- Completed: 1 December 1981
- Inaugurated: 1 March 1982

Height
- Height: 240.5 metres (789 ft)

Technical details
- Structural system: Reinforced concrete

Design and construction
- Architect: Harald Deilmann

The Rheinturm (pronounced [ˈʁaɪntʊʁm]; 'Rhine Tower') is a 240.5-metre-high (789 ft) concrete telecommunications tower in Düsseldorf, capital of the federal state (Bundesland) of North Rhine-Westphalia, Germany. Construction commenced in 1979 and finished in 1981. The Rheinturm carries aerials for directional radio, FM and TV transmitters. It stands 172.5 metres (564ft) tall and houses a revolving restaurant and an observation deck at a height of 168 metres (551ft). It is the tallest building in Düsseldorf.

The Rheinturm was inaugurated on 1 December 1981. It contains 7,500 cubic metres of concrete and weighs 22,500 tons. Before October 15, 2004, when an aerial antenna for DVB-T was mounted, it was 234.2 metres (768ft) tall. The observation deck is open to the public daily from 10:00 to 23:30.

As a special attraction, a light sculpture on its shaft works as a clock. This sculpture was designed by Horst H. Baumann and is called Lichtzeitpegel (light time level). The light sculpture on the Rheinturm is the largest digital clock in the world. The clock is a 24-hour clock with six sets of lights, two each for the Hour (00 to 24), Minutes (00 to 60), and Seconds (00 to 60), to be read from top to bottom.

== Gallery ==
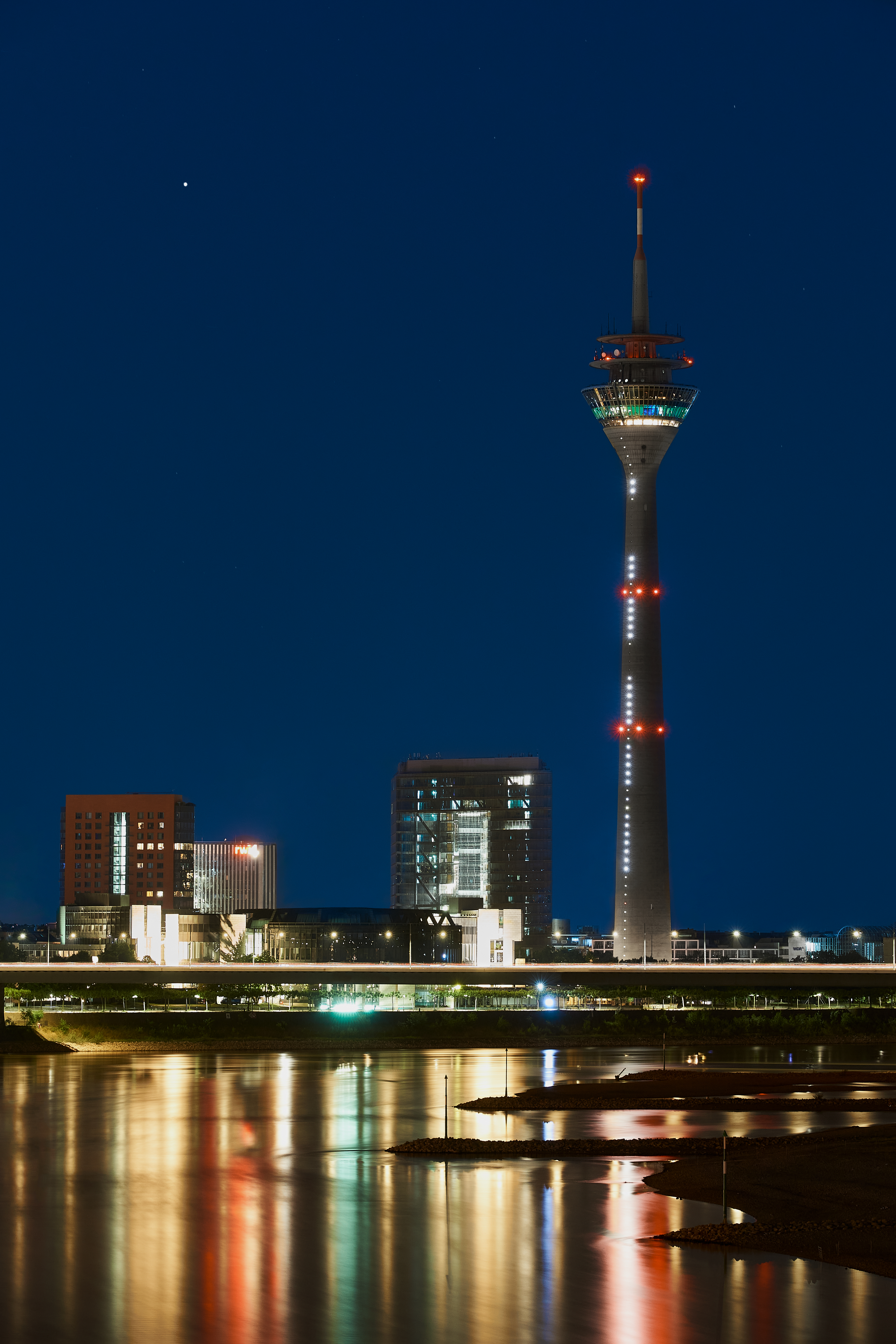
Rheinturm at blue hour

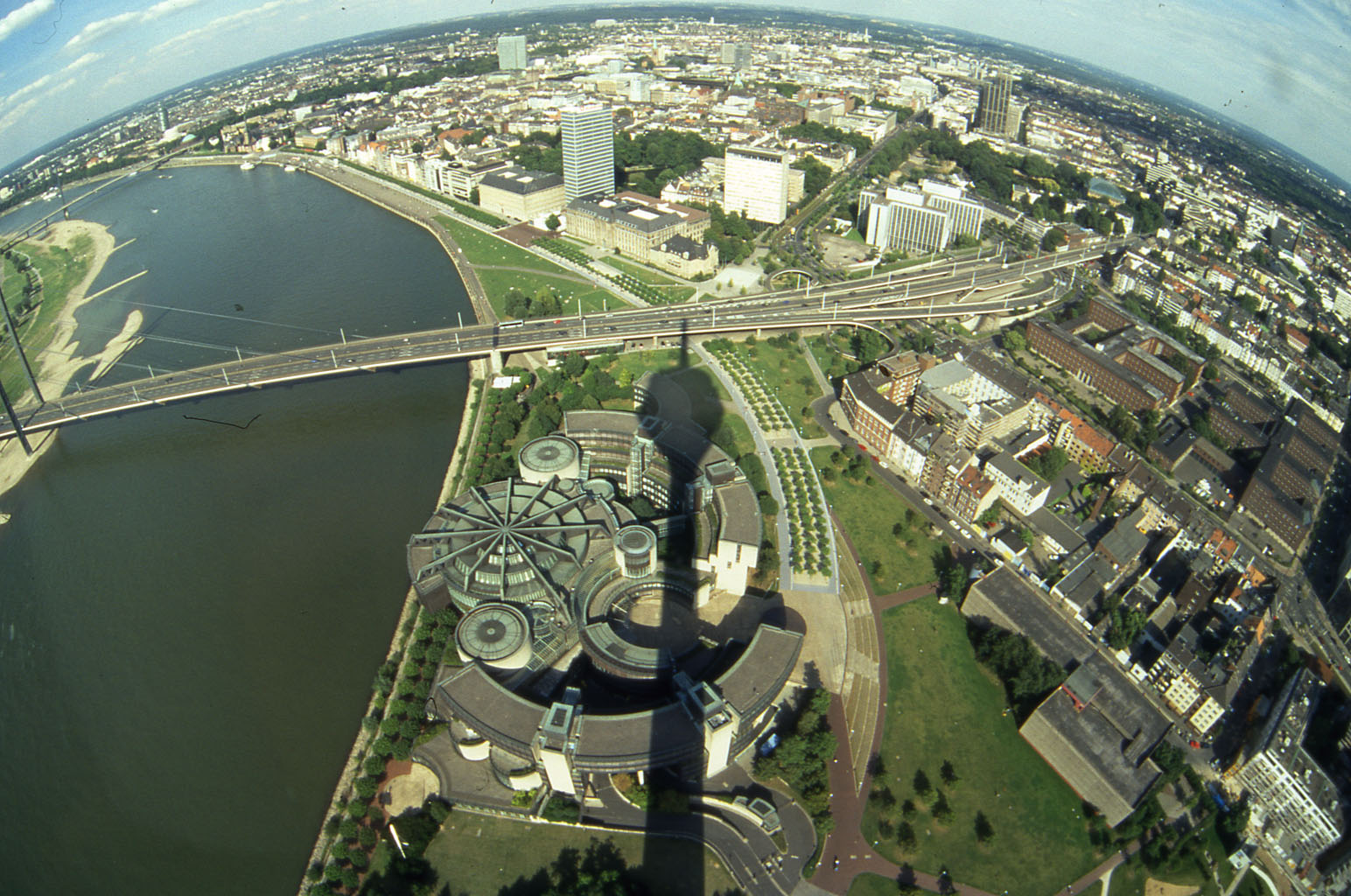
View from the Rheinturm looking down onto Stadtmitte

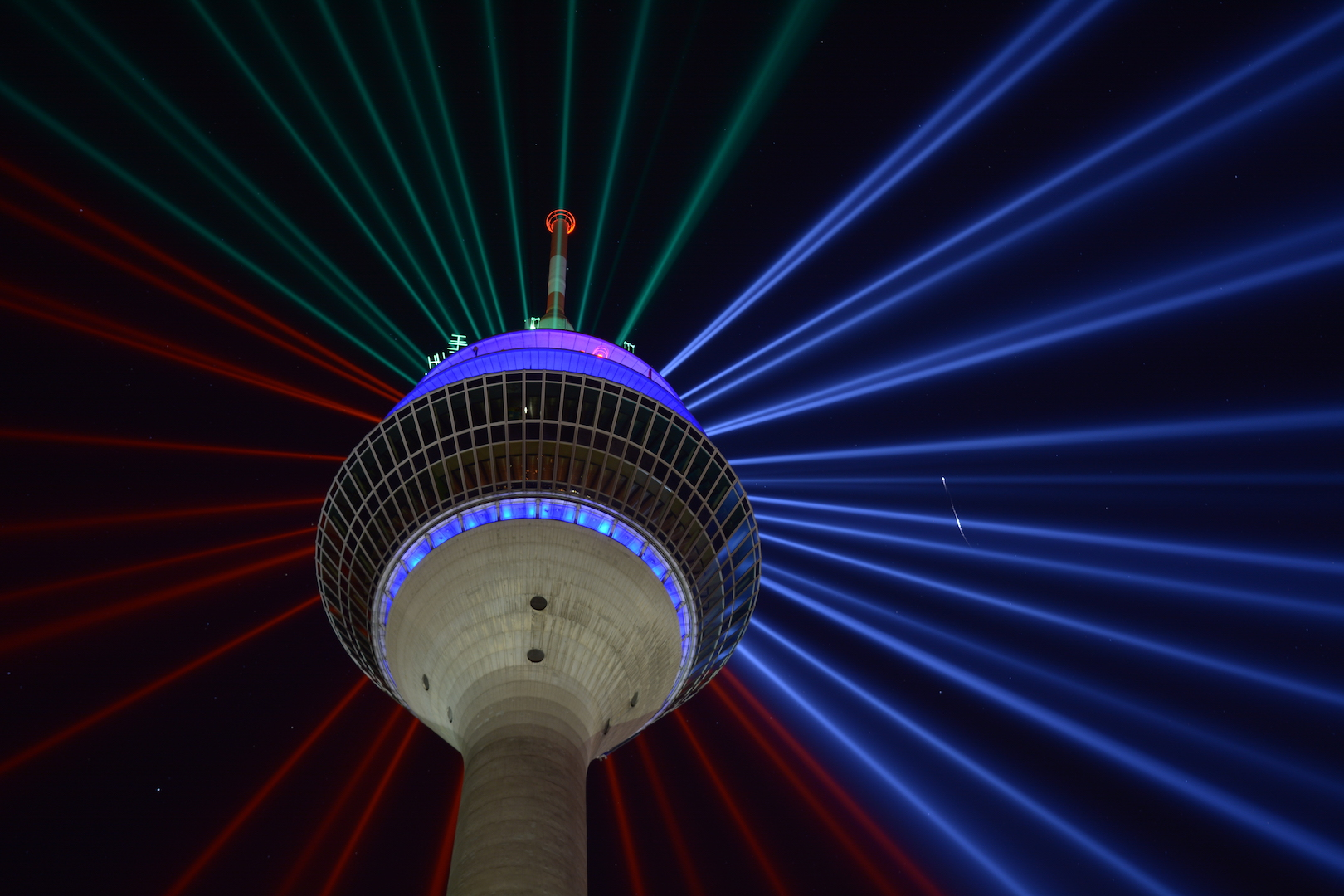
Rheinturm Düsseldorf 70th Anniversary of the state NRW Illumination with Rhine Comet

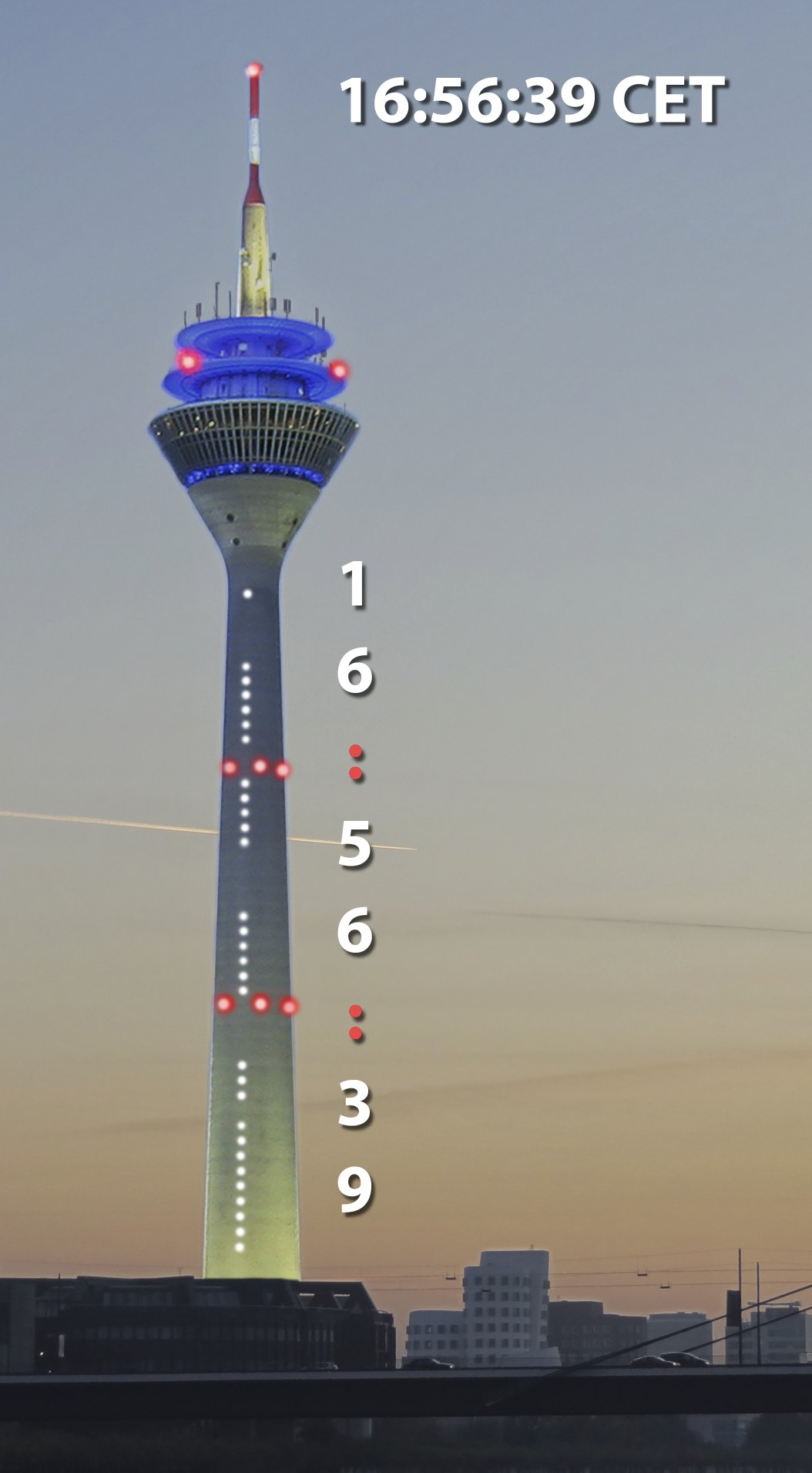
The Rheinturm displaying the time. The number of dots represents the Hour, Minutes, and Seconds as shown in the image above

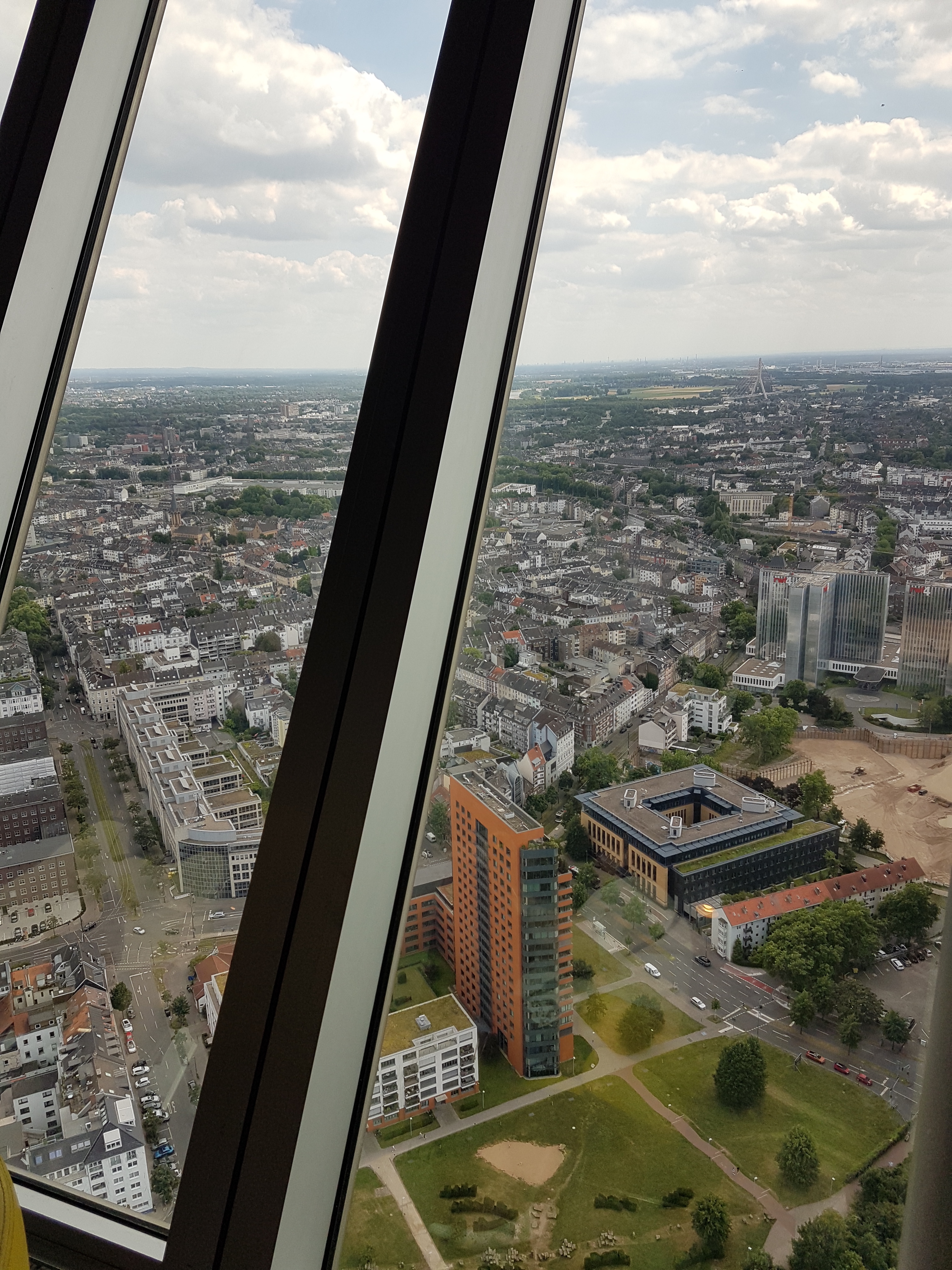
View from the Rheinturm looking down onto Bürger Park

== See also ==
- List of tallest structures in Germany
- List of tallest structures in Europe
- List of tallest towers in the world

== Literature ==
- Klaus Müller, Hermann Wegener, Heinz-Gerd Wöstemeyer: Rheinturm Düsseldorf: Daten und Fakten Triltsch Verlag, Düsseldorf 1990, ISBN 3-7998-0060-3.
- Roland Kanz: Architekturführer Düsseldorf. Dietrich Riemer Verlag, Berlin 2001, ISBN 3-496-01232-3, S. 81.
- Klaus Englert: … in die Jahre gekommen. Der Rheinturm in Düsseldorf. In db Deutsche Bauzeitung 141, 2007, Nr.6, S. 85–88, ISSN 0721-1902.
- Erwin Heinle, Fritz Leonhardt: Türme aller Zeiten, aller Kulturen. Deutsche Verlags-Anstalt, Stuttgart 1997, ISBN 3-421-02931-8, S. 235.
