= Harald Deilmann =

German architect

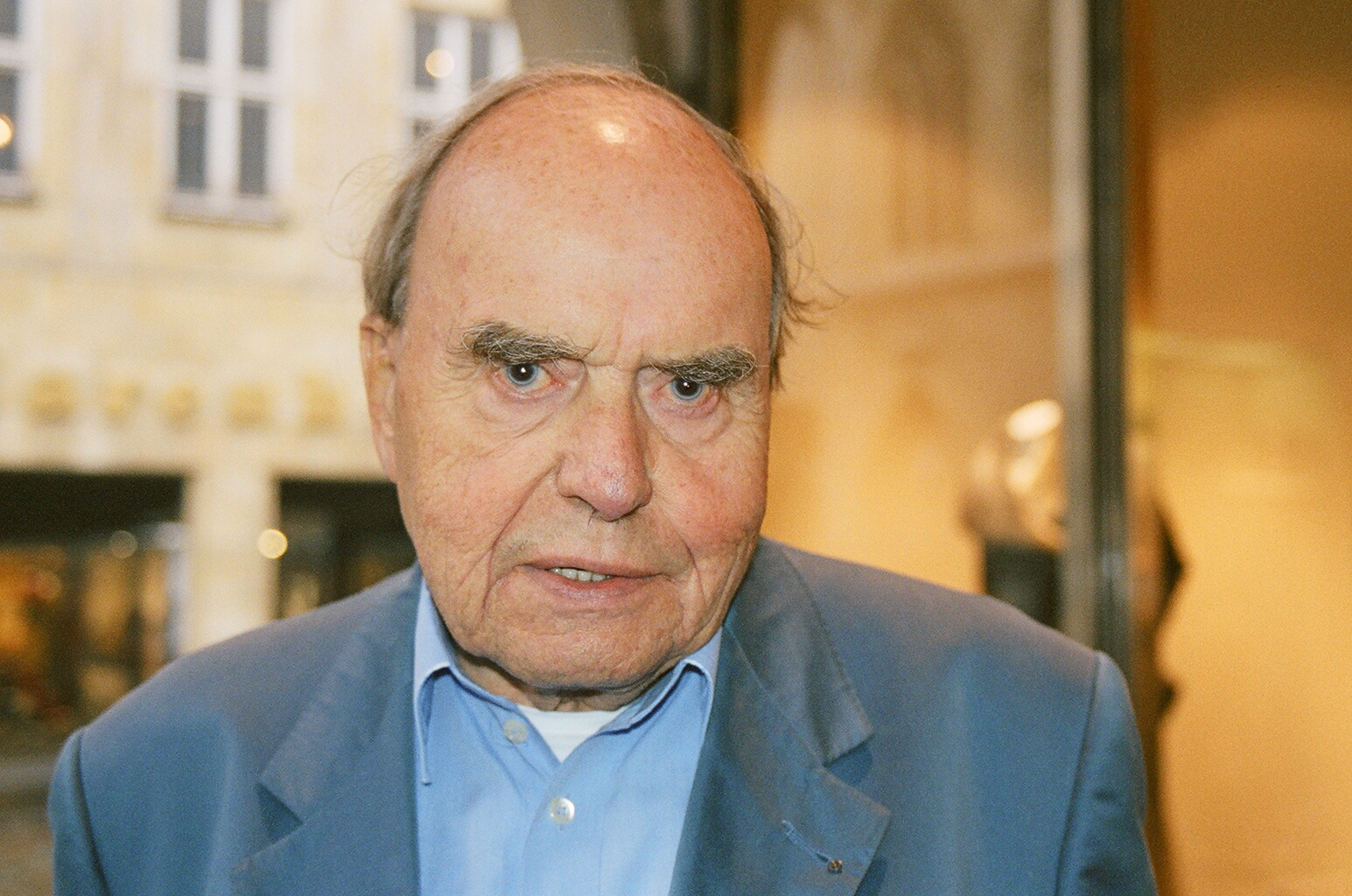
Deilmann in 2005

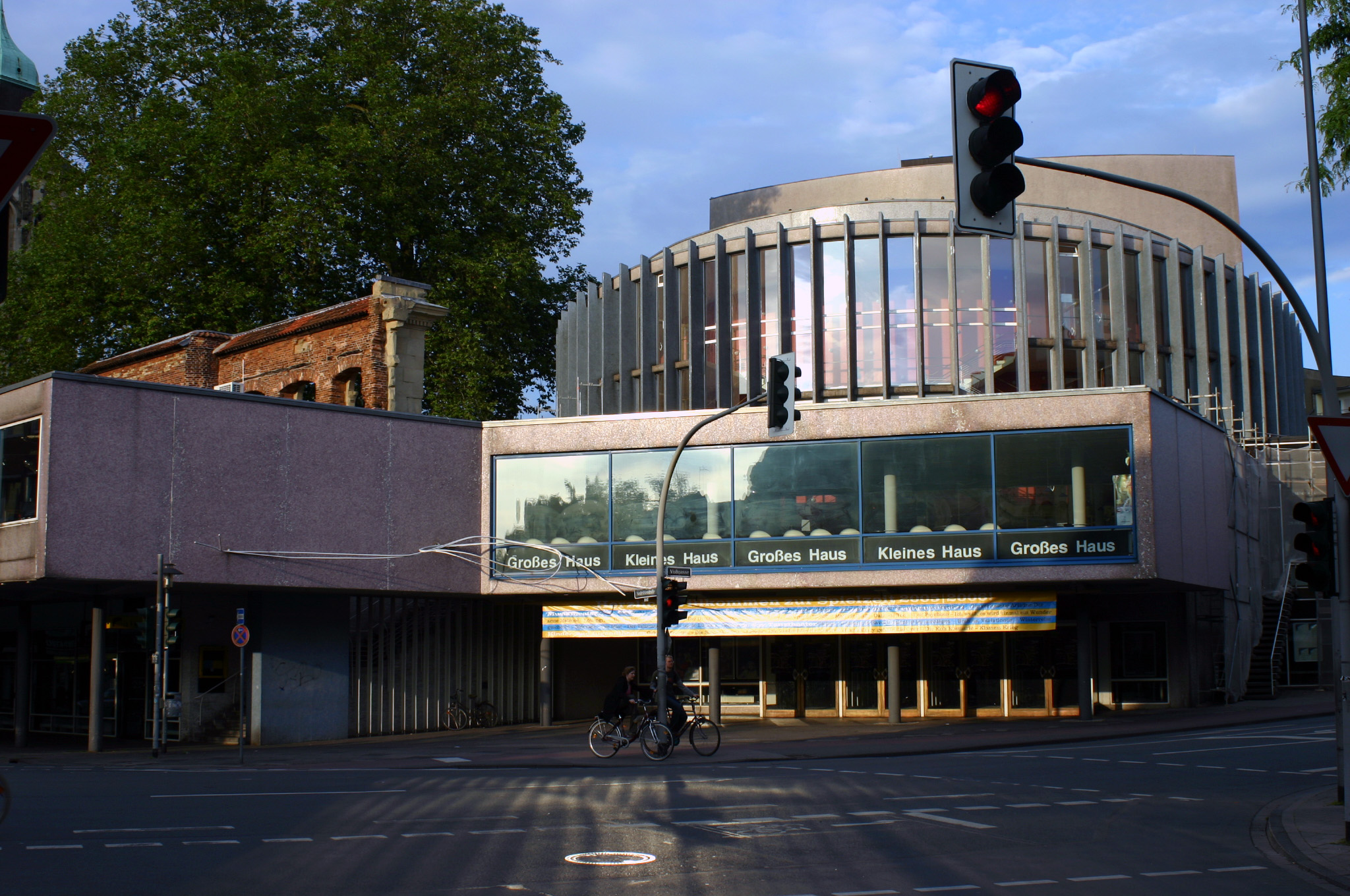
Stadttheater Münster

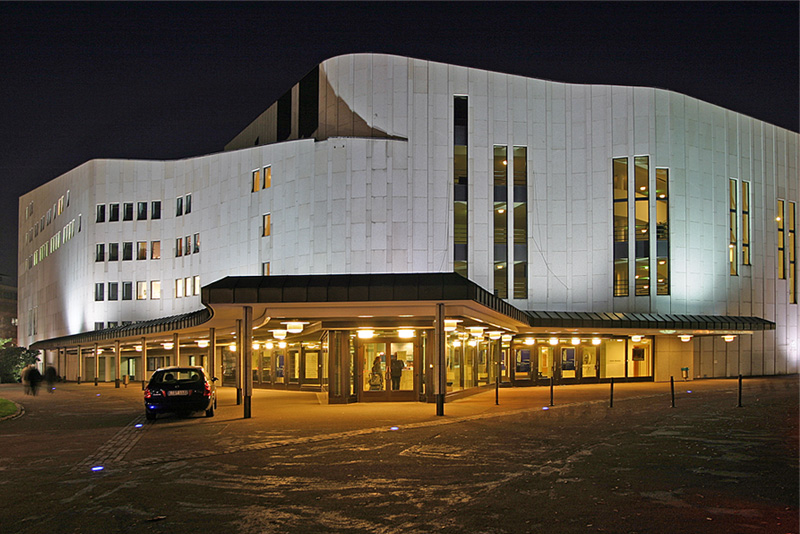
Essen Opera House

Harald Deilmann (30 August 1920 – 1 January 2008) was a German architect.

Born in Gladbeck, Westphalia, Deilmann was best known for his work on public spaces, such as opera houses and museums, throughout Germany and worldwide. He was a member of the Akademie der Künste (Academy of the Arts) in Berlin, as well as the Deutsche Akademie für Städtebau und Landesplanung (German Academy for Urban and Regional Planning) in Hanover, Germany.

He was an associate of Heinrich Bartmann (1951–1953) and joined the Architektenteam Münster (Harald Deilmann, Max von Hausen, Ortwin Rave, Werner Ruhnau in the competition for the theater Münster in 1953. He left the team before the opening of the theater Münster to start his own office in 1956. He took part in the development of his home town Münster in the time of the German Wirtschaftswunder 1950–1975. As a protagonist of postwar modernism he taught architecture at the Technical University Stuttgart and Dortmund.

Deilmann officially retired in 1985 but continued to do freelance work until his death in Münster.

== Selected awards ==
- 1962 grand prize for North Westphalia architecture
- 1998 Cross of the White Rose, Helsinki, Finland.

== Selected projects ==
- Theater:
  - 1952–1955: Stadttheater Münster
  - 1959–1988: Aalto Theatre, Essen (nach Alvar Aalto)
  - Theater in Tokyo
- City Halls:
  - 1957: Rathaus Nordwalde
  - 1971–1974: Rathaus Rheda-Wiedenbrück
  - Rathaus Gronau, North Rhine-Westphalia
- Schools and Universities
  - Schülerinternat Münster
  - Bielefeld University (competition)
  - Martin-Luther-Schule Bielefeld
  - Realschule Lemgo
  - Metallberufsschule
  - John F. Kennedy School, Berlin
- Museums
  - Clemens-Sels-Museum Neuss
- Banks:
  - WestLB Dortmund
- Town or urban planning:
  - Stadtkern Werne
  - Allwetterzoo Münster
- Office Buildings:
  - Kreishaus Münster
  - Verwaltung Nordwest Lotto Münster
  - Hauptverwaltung LVA Rheinprovinz Düsseldorf
  - Hauptverwaltung WestLB Münster, Düsseldorf und Dortmund
  - Verwaltungsgebäude Wohnbauförderungsanstalt Düsseldorf
  - Verwaltung Volkswohl-Bund in Dortmund
- Hospitals:
  - Aggertalklinik Engelskirchen
  - Städt. Krankenhaus Siegburg
  - Fachklinikum Bad Salzuflen, Ahlbeck Reingau
  - St.-Barbara-Krankenhaus Gladbeck
- Miscellaneous:
  - 1979–1981: Rheinturm Düsseldorf
