= Arag-Tower =

31-storey, 124.9 m (410 ft) office skyscraper, in Düsseldorf, Germany

ARAG Tower
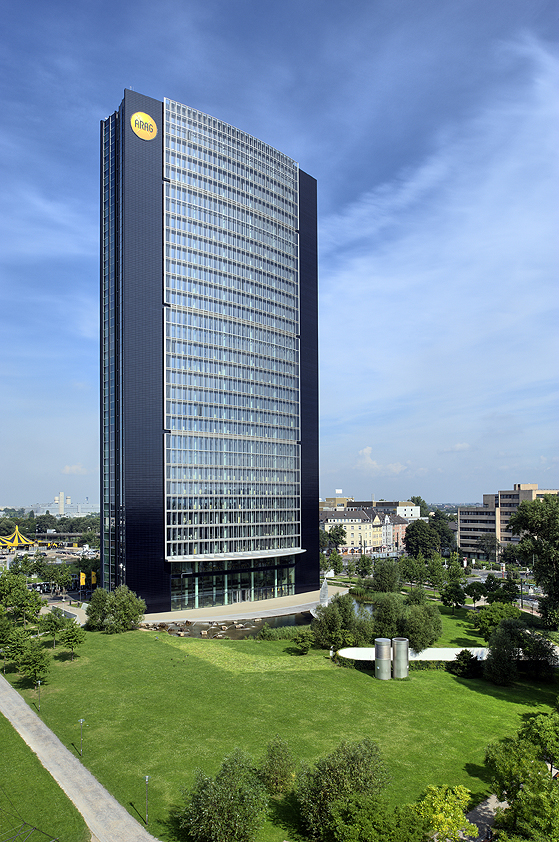
- Interactive map of the ARAG Tower area
- Alternative names: ARAG Versicherung AG; ARAG Hochhaus am Mörsenbroicher Weg

General information
- Status: Completed
- Type: Commercial offices
- Architectural style: Modernism
- Location: ARAG-Platz 1 Düsseldorf, Northrhine Westfalia, Germany
- Coordinates: 51°15′0″N 6°48′2″E
- Construction started: 1998
- Completed: 2000
- Cost: €46 million

Height
- Roof: 124.9 m (410 ft)

Technical details
- Floor count: 31; 2 below ground
- Floor area: 38,100 m^{2} (410,000 sq ft)
- Lifts/elevators: 8

Design and construction
- Architects: Foster + Partners; Rhode Kellermann Wawrowsk
- Engineer: SPI Schüßler-Plan Ingenieurgesellschaft
- Main contractor: Hochtief

ARAG Tower is a 31-storey, 124.9 m (410 ft) office skyscraper, in the northern district of Mörsenbroich, Düsseldorf, Germany. The tower is the tallest building in Düsseldorf, and it serves as headquarters for the leading legal insurer worldwide, the ARAG Group.

The architect firms of Foster + Partners and Rhode Kellermann Wawrowsky collaborated on the project, and Hochtief project management. Construction took place between 1998 and 2001 with the final cost of the building being €46 million.

Records
Preceded by LVA Hauptgebäude	Tallest building in Düsseldorf; 2001–present	Succeeded by Incumbent
