= Fashion in Nigeria =

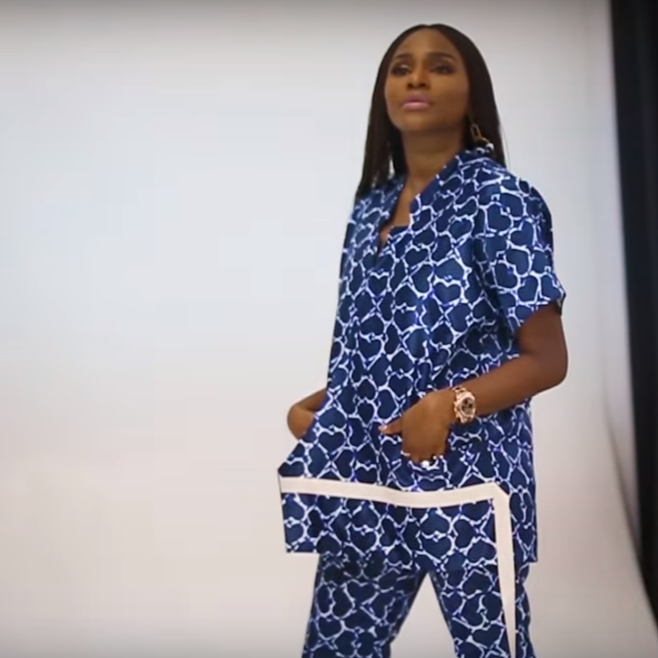
Lisa Folawiyo wearing one of her fashion designs, 2017

Fashion in Nigeria is grounded by transnational fashion designers who have adapted Nigerian textile and fashion traditions to the styles of former colonial powers. The many ethnic groups within Nigeria each have fashion traditions that have persisted through colonization to present day.

== Traditional garments ==
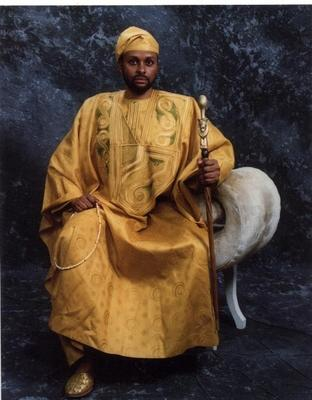
Yoruba agbada

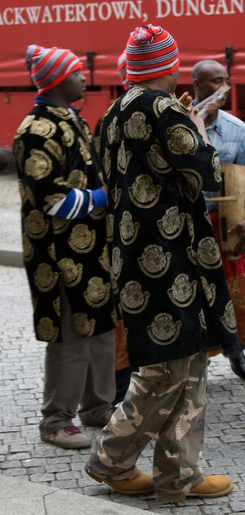
Igbo men wearing isiagu and traditional hat

Nigerians usually dress casually because of the hot climate. However, both formal and traditional clothing are also worn. Many African cultures have a characteristic traditional style of dress that is important to their heritage. Traditional garments worn in Nigeria include:

Yoruba men wear agbada, which is a formal attire, commonly worn as part of a three-piece set: an open-stitched full gown, a long-sleeved shirt, and sokoto (trousers fitted snugly at the ankle).

The Hausa wear Babaringa. The isiagu is a men's pullover shirt similar to a dashiki that is worn by many groups in Africa. The traditional attire of Igbo men includes an isiagu patterned with embroidered lion heads, usually worn with trousers and a traditional striped hat.

Traditional Yoruba dress uses textiles and fine beads (Iyun, Akun, Ikan, Segi, Opoto, Eri Eyin and others) to reflect social status and religious affiliation as well as personal identity and taste. Gold, Silver and other jewelry is also worn by Yoruba women.

The Edo also traditionally express their status and identity with beads, but also with raffia work, anklets, and bangles. Edo men traditionally wear coral beads of two kinds, ekan and ivie, with either suits or traditional robes. Traditionally, they wear a white shirt contrasting with brightly striped fabric.

The Gele is a traditional Yoruba woman's head wrapping made of firm material. It may be worn as a fashionable accessory on formal occasions but can also be a daily wear. The gele is paired with Iro ati Buba, Komole dress or Asoebi dresses by Yoruba women. Edo women wear a wedding crown called an okuku.

Muslim women in northern Nigeria wear various types of veil, including the hijab, which reveal part of the face but cover the hair and may cover much of the body. Veiling may take fashionable forms.

== History ==
=== Independence (1960- Present) ===
==== Post Independence ====
Before independence, when Nigeria was still a colony of Britain, indigenous fashion traditions such as adire indigo dyeing came to be viewed negatively. In their place Western garments became signs of power and elitism. Yoruba elites and fashion designers began to wear traditional fashion in an act of protest.

==== 21st Century ====
As of October 2024 the apparel and footwear industry is worth approx. ₦1,177,726,700,000 trillion naira ($783,000,000 U.S. dollars). The Nigerian fashion industry grew 17% between 2010 and 2019, with events such as Lagos Fashion Week helping to promote it. The COVID-19 pandemic, which moved fashion shows online, led to more attention to Lagos Fashion Week and other fashion showcases in Africa.

== Notable people ==
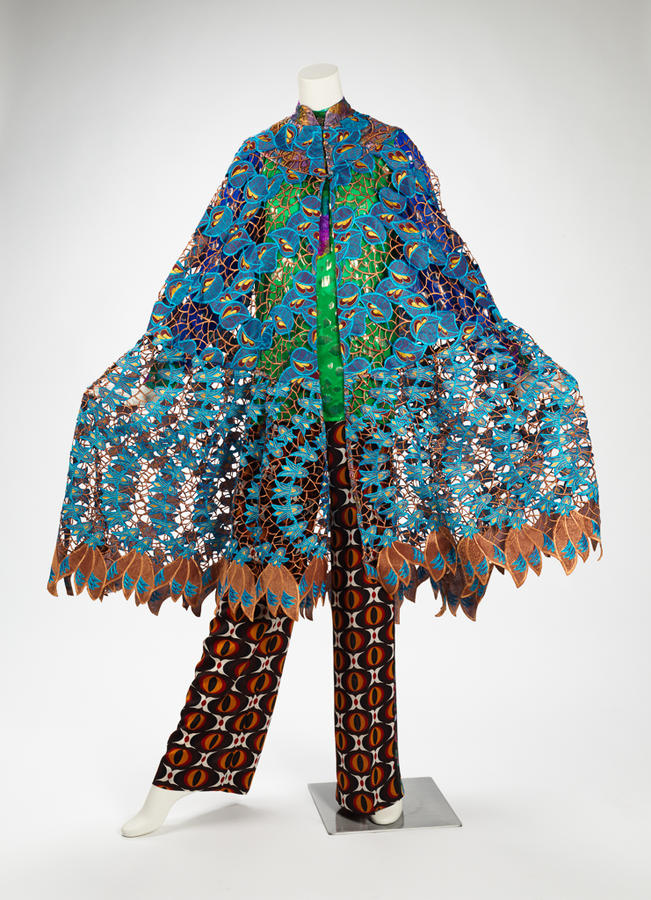
Ensemble by Duro Olowu, spring-summer 2013

- Shade Thomas-Fahm: Specialises in simple designs using locally woven and dyed textiles in the 1960s and 1970s
- Duro Olowu
- Lisa Folawiyo: Uses traditional West African fabrics to produce modern tailored designs; showcases urban fashion with Afropop influences.
- Philip Ojire: founder of Freak Vault Clothing
- Omotoso Oluwabukunmi of TWIF Clothing
- Kenneth Ize
- Tolu Coker
- Evans Akere

== Evolution of Nigerian Fashion ==
The rich cultural diversity in Nigerian society has a huge influence on the Nigerian fashion world, with the various elements of the varying ethnic groups showcasing their unique designs and customs even in the modern-day. Nigerian fashion goes beyond the display of beautiful designs to the portrayal of cultural and symbolic importance with the incorporation of some indigenous textiles such as the adire, aso oke, and ankara prints.

Although there have been a lot of changes in the Nigerian fashion world, there is still a retention of its unique beauty and originality. Fashion in the 1960s was characterized by women dressing in both fitted and oversized attires as well as mini skirts and dresses with simple local hairstyles and Afros. While the men wore bright-coloured shirts in different patterns and marched with tight skinny pants. The 1970s were characterized by baggy-sleeved buba worn on wrappers tied a little above the knees to the mid-thighs called Oleku for women, and men wore agbada and danshiki outfits with both gender jerry curls and permed hair.

The 1980s had women wearing maxi skirts and men oversized suits with huge permed hair. The fashion trend started to experience a significant change in the 1990s with the influence of America with miniskirts, scousers and native boubous for women. Men also had a difference in the trouser fashion with narrower hems and loosely fitted around the hip and waist region. Currently, Nigerian fashion continues to change and evolve with the incorporation of traditional fabrics and bold, colourful designs to make different styles.

Nigerian streetwear has gained global recognition on the world of fashion stage, with the likes of Kenneth Ize being chosen as one of the finalists for the LVMH Prize for emerging fashion designers. Another prominent Nigerian designer is Amaka Osakwe, founder of the Maki Oh, whose design was worn by the then-first lady of the United States Michelle Obama.

== See also ==
- Akwete Cloth
- Adire (textile art)
- Isiagu
