= Aso oke =

Yoruba hand-woven fabric

Two Aso oke panels of the Petuje (Etu) type during production on a vertical loom in Owo

Yoruba people in Aso oke clothes

A young lady displaying Ofi Alaari

Aso oke (Yoruba: Aṣọ òkè), lit. 'cloth from the hinterland' or simply 'country cloth', also known by its original name of Aso ofi lit. 'cloth of the loom', is a hand-woven cloth that originated among the Yoruba people of Yorubaland in Nigeria and beyond. Aso oke comes in hundreds of unique patterns; at least 150 distinct patterns were observed in a single year — 1978 just in the Ibadan and Lagos market, and new patters are constantly being developed based on cultural evolution and consumer requirements.

Usually woven by men, the fabric is used to make men's gowns, called agbada and hats called fila, as well as various articles of Yoruba female clothing, such as; wrappers called Ìró, blouses called Bùbá, fitted gowns called Komole, head ties called gele, as well as sashes and shoulder shawls called Ìborùn for both genders, used around the neck by men and across the shoulder or hip by women, large cloths for men called Ibora when used as a cape, and Gogowu when used as a toga, a second wrapper called Ìpèlé, and so on.

Aso oke is from the Yoruba culture in Kwara, Kogi, Ondo, Oyo, Ogun, Ekiti, Lagos, and Osun States in western Nigeria and other parts of Yorubaland. Some of the most prominent production centres are the cities of Iseyin, Osogbo and Ilorin, while Owo in Ondo state is particularly known for its several unique and beautiful varieties. Aso oke has also influenced cloth weaving in neighboring ethnic groups. The weaving technique used in Abomey and some other groups in the northern parts of Benin are a result of direct expansion of Yoruba influence on these groups. The modern weaving technique and equipments of the Nupe people also exhibit Yoruba influences.

The way of making the cloth has remained the same for centuries, however new techniques and production methods have been looked into to eliminate the weight and thickness of the Aso oke cloth. Lighter fabrics make this garment more accessible for casual wear, as many of the locally woven Aso oke were unsuitable for certain climactic conditions. The utility of Aso oke has also evolved beyond its use in the making of traditional clothing staples, as it is now being made into western or contemporary styled clothes such as Aso oke jackets, ties, waistcoats and blazer suits to suit the taste and fashion choices of diverse populations.

== Types of Aso oke ==
Aso oke comes in a wide array of different designs and colours. Aso oke fabric can also be worn or interlaced with other Yoruba fabric types, like 'Aran' or 'Seda', velvet-type textiles with concentric designs.

Other ways that designers have made this old traditional cloth become more modern is to "structurally manipulate and combine animal and floral motifs into definite shapes of grids and geometry, suitable for computer design applications." The basis of more traditional motifs would have originated from fables and folklore. Although in theory the color combinations and patterns of Aso oke are limitless, a few have become people's favorites. Some of the most popular types include:

- Sanyan — Woven from Anaphe wild silk (Anaphe infracta and Anaphe venata) and cotton yarns. The color of the silk gives the sanyan a tan, creamy white or brown color with white stripes running through. In ancient times, Sanyan was the most expensive of all Yoruba woven fabrics.
- Alaari — The Alaari is usually made in a deep red/maroon, crimson or vibrant purple backdrop striped by bands of different other colors, The threads are made from locally spun silk or cotton colored by traditionally dyeing in camwood (osùn) over several dips.
- Etu — Bears a dark indigo or black colour with thin white or light blue stripes in the warp (vertical) direction noted for their simplicity. Its patterns are more visibly striped with a faint hint of checkering, so named after the pattern of the guinea fowl, called Ẹtu in Yoruba. In ancient times, it was used by chiefs and elders as an important social dress. Black Etu cloths are called Olowududu.
- Petuje — These are Aso oke with larger plaid/checkered or gridded patterns on lighter blue-purple-white bases. It is a sub-class of the Etu style. Its name means; 'kill and eat guinea fowl', but contextually, it connotes surpassing the Etu cloth.
- Opa Aro — A dark blue woven cloth in solid colour broken with a stripe of green.
- Ifun or Fu : A combination of light brown and navy blue woven cloth.
- Waka : A woven cloth of solid black background with one or two warp stripes of red.
- Aso-ipo : These are red blanket-like woven funerary, memorial and egungun cloths of the Bunu-Oworo people, of which there are five designs and sizes: Ifale, Abata, Ebe, Oja and Aponuponyin.

All of these types can be woven plain or in the Onjawu or Jawu make, which is when Aso oke is woven with a traditional perforated lace-like design or interlaced with shiny metallic lurex threads or glitter.

In the past, an important part of the Aso oke production process is beating them with a heavy mallet after the completion of weaving to give them a look of refinement, increase color density, and produce a sheen/smooth texture, a process known as beetling.

== As ceremonial wear ==
Yoruba people around the world wear Aso oke fabric for special occasions, including holidays, weddings, graduations, funerals and chieftaincy title ceremonies. Designer Kenneth Ize has brought the fabric to international runways, with suiting worn by models Naomi Campbell and Imaan Hammam.

=== Use in Yoruba spirituality ===
Followers of the Yoruba religion also wear Aso oke fabric. As part of the costume ensemble In Egungun masquerade performances, the under-sack, i.e the fabric worn closest to the masker's skin, Aso oke, specifically the etu type must be used and must completely seal the masker's body. It has a similar resemblance to a shroud that wraps the deceased (since the egungun are themselves regarded as Ara orun i.e 'the collective dead'). On top of this base layer comes other lappets, masks, fronds, tassels, and other embellishments.

=== Use in Yoruba women's garment ===
Traditional Yoruba women's garment, usually consists of four parts:

- Buba: A blouse
- Iro: A wrap skirt (or wrapper)
- Gele: Head tie
- Iborun : Shawl or sash
- Ipele: Shoulder sash or second wrapper

However Yoruba women's garments are made from different other Yoruba traditional fabrics aside Aso oke. These include Adire, Seghosen, Aso olona, as well as laces, Ankara, and Damask. Yoruba women garments also include Pakaja/Kaja and hair-beads.

== Horizontal loom male weaving ==
Aso oke weaving in Kwara State on a horizontal loom

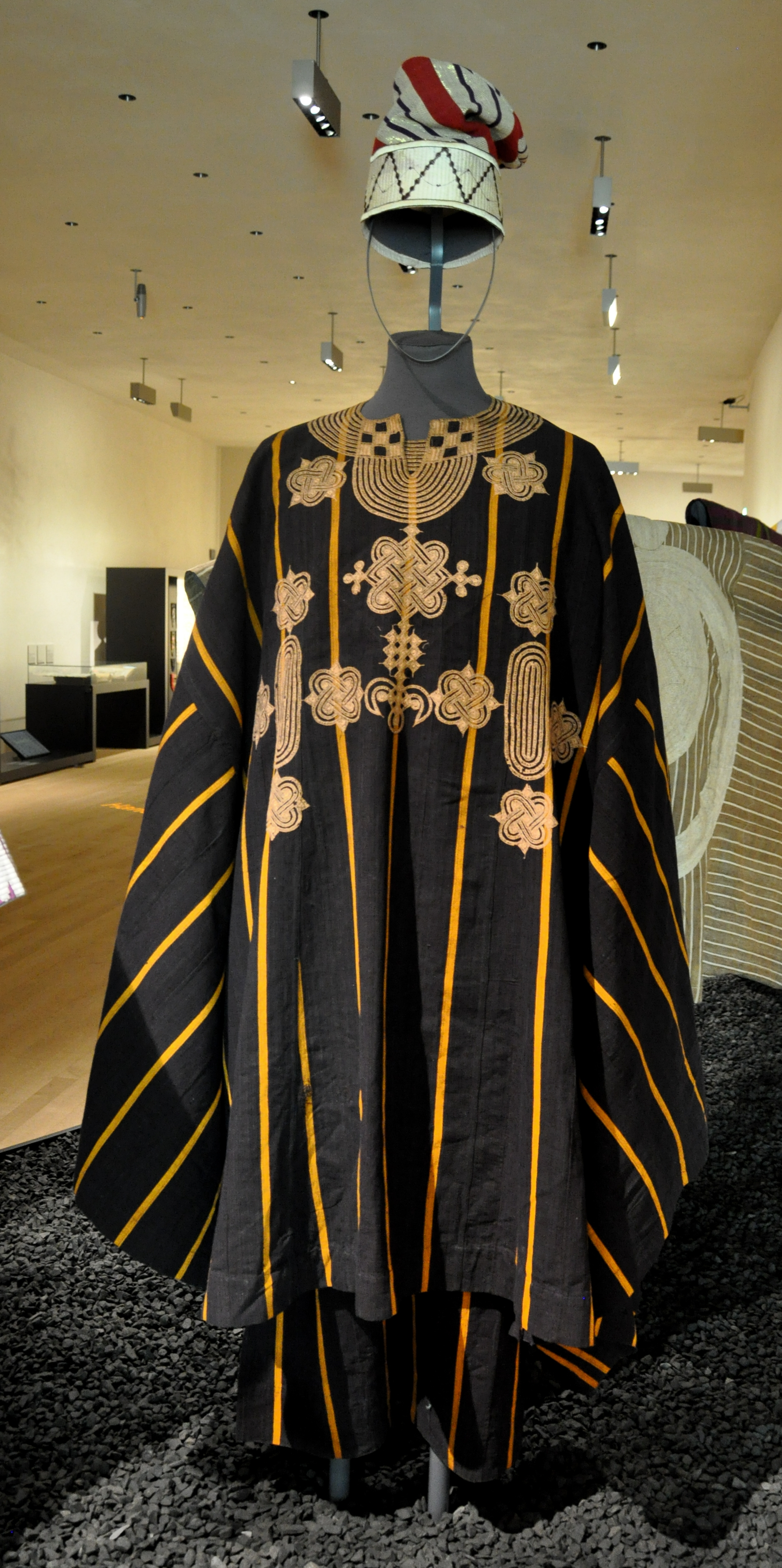
Aso oke (Ofi) sewn into Agbada outfit and Fila

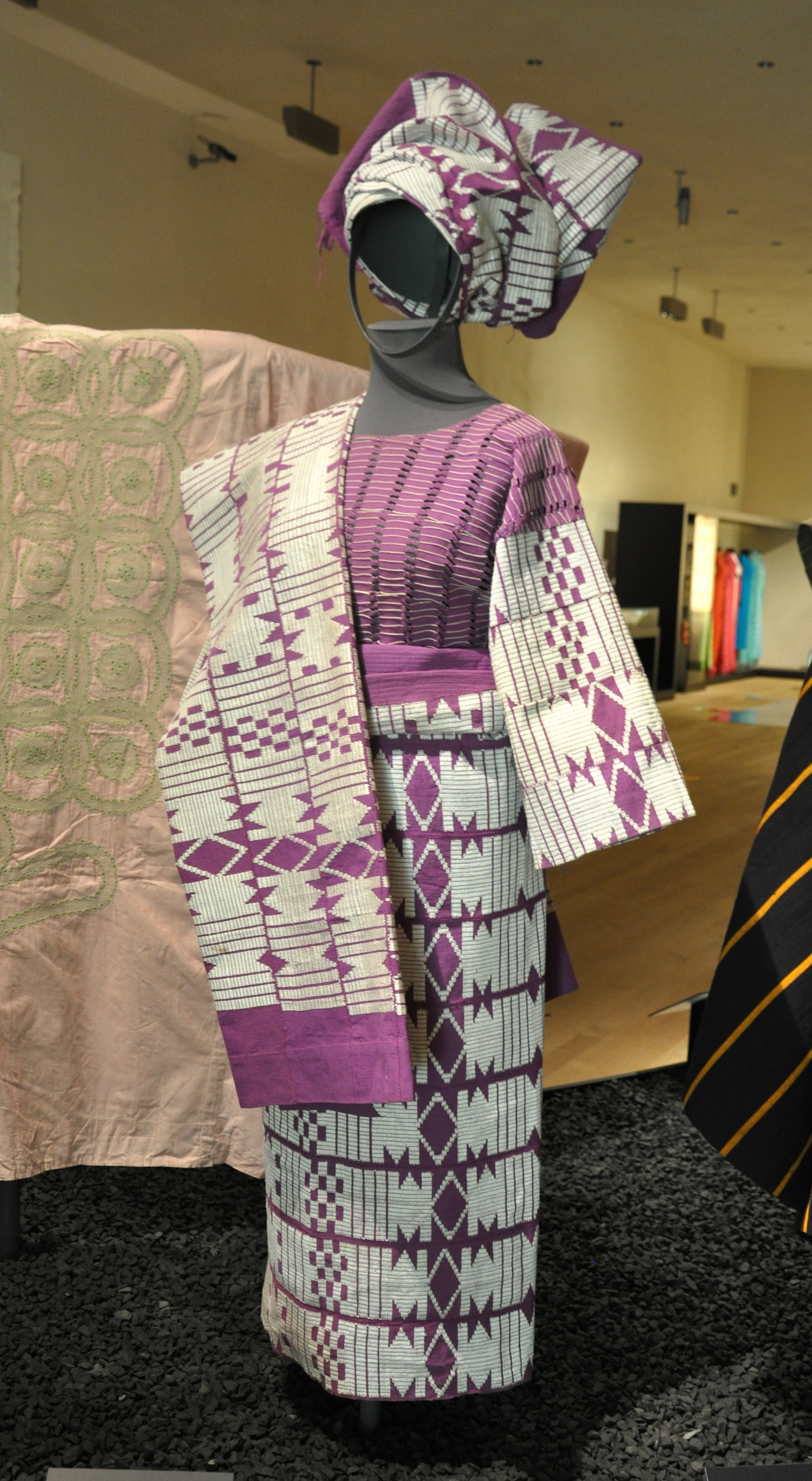
1970's era traditional Aso oke as Iro, Buba, Iborun and Gele for women

The largest concentration in Yorubaland of male weavers using the narrow strip horizontal loom are in the cities of Iseyin, Osogbo, Ilorin and Oyo, with a smaller group concentration in Abeokuta and Ogbomosho. Of these towns, Iseyin is the most important. In 1952/3, one in five males was a weaver, and the Ole-Oke quarter is made up entirely of weavers. In the same years, Iseyin town alone produced some estimated million square yards of Aso oke each year, and was consuming 20% of all the yarn imported into Nigeria. In Ilorin, just as in Iseyin, weavers occupy a whole quarter, the Pakata, made up entirely of thousands of weaving families.

From these major centres, weavers have moved out and spread to outlying villages and towns. The most impotant migration of weavers has been those from the Iseyin—Oyo axis, whose weavers have populated Ibadan, to Ife where they serve the court of the Ooni. Other groups of them have moved to Iwo, Ede, Shaki, Ido-Ekiti, Ado Ekiti, Okeho, and as far north as Mokwa in the Nupe area. Another expansion of weavers has been that outwards from Ilorin, from where weavers have moved into the Yagba area, and the town of Egbe in particular, into Lokoja on the Niger river, Ijebu Ode, and a few have settled in Owo and Iworoko-Ifaki. They have migrated and settled as far east as Keffi.

A lot of the trade in Aso oke is carried out on the basis of individual orders, and weaving compounds may sometimes sub-contract bulk orders of Aso ebi calling for large quantities of finished cloth to other families. Traditionally, there are two major market systems handling cloth in the Yoruba country; wholesale markets (seventeen day cycles) and retail market chains (daily or on market days depending on town/village). The two most important wholesale markets were the Araromi market just outside Oyo which was supplied by the weavers of Iseyin, Oyo, and Ogbomosho, and the Ede market which was supplied by weavers from Osogbo, Ife, Akure and Ilorin (a smaller portion of the clothes from Ilorin supplies northern markets such as Nupeland, Zaria, Kano and Abuja with Aso oke). Purchased clothes were then taken from both, to the big Oje market in Ibadan which served as a distribution centre for stocks supplying markets all over Yorubaland and beyond. Weaving, and other connected/related activities such as dyeing, sale of its raw materials, tailoring, embroidery, finished cloth mercantile activities, etc therefore make up an important and significant portion of the local economy of Yorubaland.

=== The horizontal loom ===
Narrow horizontal looms used in making Aso oke exist in two main forms in Yorubaland; Those based on grounded poles, and those of the carpentered frame. It is mostly the domain of male weavers.

=== Weaving terminology (Horizontal loom) ===
The Yoruba terms for some horizontal loom components and design tools include: Ofi (loom), Iya Okeke lit. 'mother of the loom' (the top pulley, wheel or axel), the Akata (propeller), Iye (long wheel), Iya ofi (supporter for the warp beam), pofi (warp beam), agbonrin (breast beam/staff), Apasa ('sword stick' or striker), Akate akowu (short wheel or skein winder), Gowu and Kokogun (rollers), Omu (extender used in holding the reel), Odada (bobbin carrier frame for warping up), Akuaro (bobbin), Itese (pedals), Okuku (strain holder i.e sledge for drag weights), Sugudu (propeller hanger), Sanrin (metallic peg), Sofi (perforator), Omu Aso lit. 'breast of the cloth' (heddles), and Oko Aso (shuttle).

== Vertical loom female weaving ==
Ijebu Ode weaver on a vertical loom c. 1912

Vertical loom weaving is the speciality of women in Yorubaland, and It is ubiquitous across the cultural region. It can be subdivided into two broad groups:

- Western — Ilorin, Ilesha, Ibadan, Omu Aran, Ijebu Ode
- Eastern — Ekiti region (Ado, Ikere, Ido, etc), Owo, Kabba

Weaving usually takes place within the walls of a compound or enclosure. The popular Senghosen cloth of Owo, and the Aso olona cloth of Ijebu are both examples of traditional Yoruba vertical loom female weaving. Clothes produced from the looms can be used immediately production is completed as single panel products, or they can be joined selvedge to selvedge and sown into larger pieces. Some of the most complicated inlay patterns found on woven cloth in Nigeria are those produced by the weavers of Owo.

The whole range of patterns produced by the horizontal looms can also be replicated on the vertical looms, and one of the more popular single panel products of vertical looms among Yoruba people are the Iborun (shoulder shawls) and Ipele (extra waist wrappers).

=== Weaving terminology (Vertical loom) ===
The western Yoruba terms for some vertical loom component and design tools include: Ofi (loom), Igi ofi (loom uprights), Porofi (horizontal beams), Apasa (sword/beater), Asa (heddles), Atu (shuttle), Iye (small bobbin), Kere (spindle), Abisi (shed stick), Akate ekowu (short wheel or skein winder of the basket or cage type), Ika owo (skein winder of the cruciform type). In eastern Yoruba; Igi iwole are the loom uprights, Gbogboro (the horizontal beams), Utu (shuttles), Pankere (cane used for shuttle), Atita (spreader), and Abiri (shed stick).

== Weaving, technique and materials ==
=== Patterns and decorations ===
The basic background patterning for Aso oke is mostly achieved through careful warp color alignments. This is similar to techniques used by other groups in West Africa like the Nupe, Fon, Ewe and Asante, and it produces a myriad of possible designs. However, the Yoruba supplement this with three extra major decorative traits which sets their weaving apart from those of the aforementioned groups. They are:

- The use of holes: This is done by gathering groups of warp threads and weaving them together with separate wefts, producing oval slits. Such products are called 'Aso eleya' or 'Oniho'. In addition, it may involve long yarns of threads which can be vertical or diagonal, that skip or 'carry over' through the holes from one to the next, appearing on only one side, called 'Onjawu' or 'Jawu'.
- The use of inlay floats: This is a design method that produces spaced bands of bare areas running warp-wise, followed by areas of heavy patterning. When the Aso oke strips are finished to make the final garment, they are arranged such that the clear and the patterned banded areas of each strip are not always aligned, producing a more desired effect.
- The use of warp Ikat: A weaving technique where bunches of lengthwise/vertical threads are first resist-dyed (by bunching them up and tieing up at intervals before dyeing), while the cross threads are left a solid color. This produces an effect with areas of light and shade that blend up gradually instead of abruptly. This is called 'Alabe' in most of Yorubaland, and 'Waka' in Ilorin.

All three embellishment methods can be combined in a single fabric. After weaving, embroidery work using silk threads is often needed on finished clothes/robes around the collars, pockets, backside, chest, etc. This was traditionally done by skilled craftsmen known as 'Junkan', and it was usually a costly business. Machine embroidery is now the norm.

Some old (vintage) Aso oke panels

Aso Oke Etu

Aso oke Alabe (ikat) and lurex

Aso Oke 1800's design

Alaari Eleya or Oniho (with holes)

Aso Oke - Sanyan

The choice of the colour and design used in making the different Aso-Oke types is a reflection of aspects of the beliefs and lives of the Yoruba people, and is usually passed down from one generation to another within family lines. The patterns represent forms of non-verbal communication with each design telling a story. Traditionally, the materials used in the past were locally sourced and included native cotton, local silk from Anaphe caterpillar cocoons, and threads dyed with indigo.

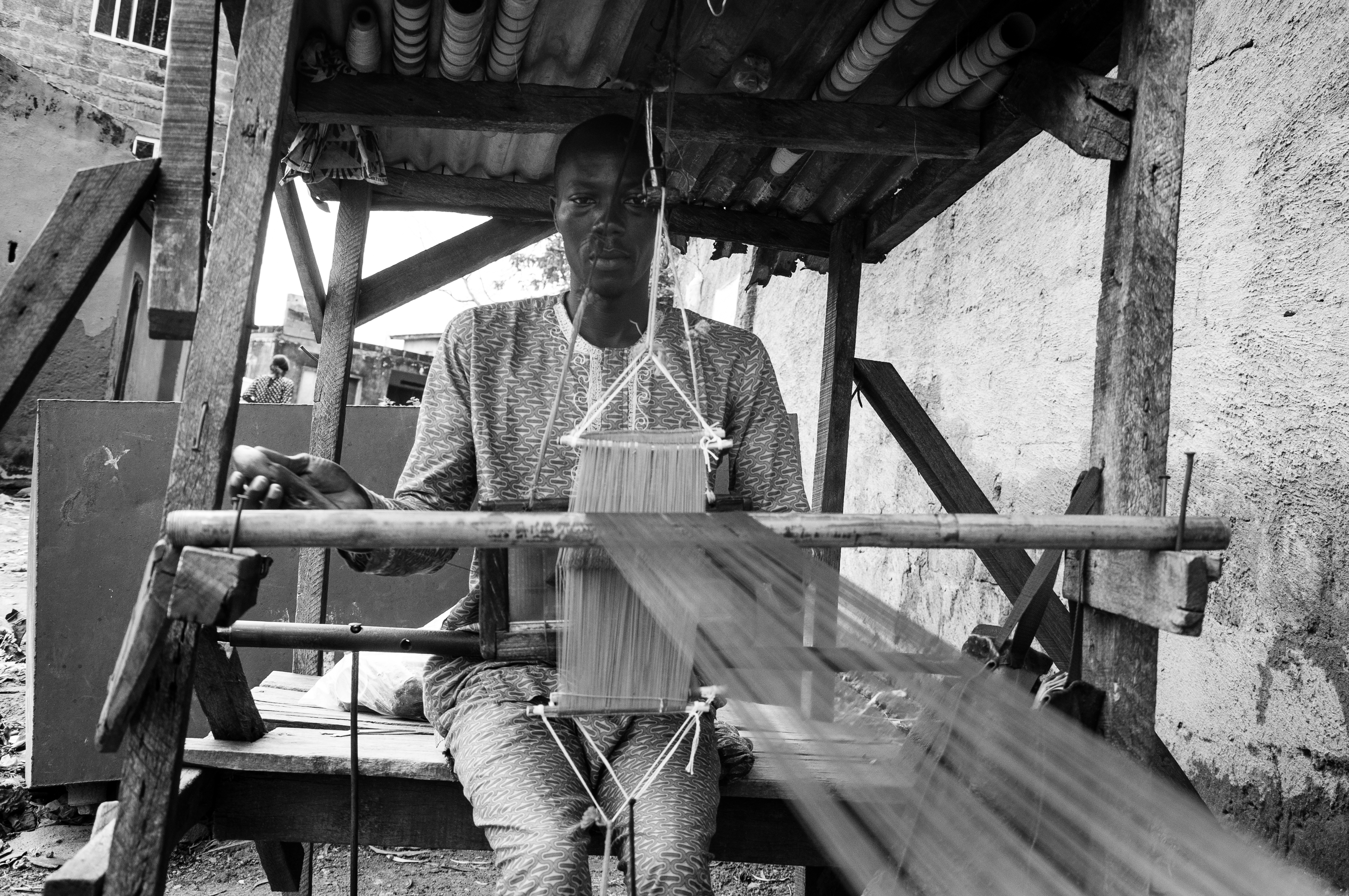
An Ofi (Aso Oke) weaver using a Flying shuttle

A documentary on making Aṣọ Òkè

The technique involves several steps, which include preparing the yarn, which in most cases is made from dyed cotton or silk, setting the loom, and then weaving the fabric. The cotton used in making Aso-oke is hand made into thread which is combined with other materials in the production. for the yarn are made from natural materials such as onion skin and bark, after which the yarn is made into threads and rolled onto bobbins. After the Yarn is made, the loom is set into two frames consisting of two vertical posts and a horizontal beam. The thread from the warp, which runs vertically, is wound on the beam and threaded through small metal or wooden frames called heddles, which help control the warp thread. The threads that run horizontally (called the weft) are then woven into the fabric with the control use of a shuttle through a technique known as pick and pick, which involves alternating between the two weft threads, thereby making a pattern by so doing on the fabric. During patterning, the canoe reels are hinged upon the hangers on a set of metallic pegs on the ground. This is done to roll the cotton into bundles after which, the actual weaving can begin.

== See also ==
- Adire: Yoruba tie-dye textiles
- Seghosen : Yoruba patterned fabric from Owo
- Aso Olona : Yoruba Ijebu patterned fabric
- Fila (hat)
- Agbada
- Yoruba women's clothing
- Kente cloth—Woven by Ashanti people
- Barkcloth—Woven by Baganda people
- African textiles
