= Port Harcourt (disambiguation) =

Port Harcourt is the largest city in Rivers State, and the second largest commercial city in Nigeria.

Port Harcourt may also refer to:

- Port Harcourt (local government area)
- Port Harcourt Book Festival, a literary festival
- Port Harcourt Cemetery
- Port Harcourt International Airport
- Port Harcourt International Fashion Week, an annual clothing and fashion event
- Port Harcourt Is Back, a song by Muma Gee from Motherland
- Port Harcourt NAF Base, an airport
- Port Harcourt Refining Company
- Port Harcourt Sharks, a football club
- Port Harcourt Son, a song by singer Duncan Mighty
- Port Harcourt Zoo

== See also ==
- University of Port Harcourt
