= MIC Datenverarbeitung =

Austrian software company

MIC Datenverarbeitung GmbH
- Type: Private
- Industry: Software
- Founded: 1988
- Founders: Alfred Hiebl Sr., Manfred Biermayer
- Headquarters: Linz, Austria
- Key people: Alfred Hiebl (CEO)
- Products: Customs and trade-compliance software
- Revenue: €70 million (2024)
- Number of employees: >550 (2025)
- Website: www.mic-cust.com

MIC Datenverarbeitung GmbH (commonly referred to as MIC) is an Austrian software company based in Linz. The company develops software for global trade management such as customs management, export control and trade compliance.

== History ==
MIC Datenverarbeitung GmbH was founded in 1988 in Linz, Austria by Alfred Hiebl Sr. and Manfred Biermayer. The company began its international expansion in 1993, when its software was first installed in Germany.

More international projects followed in cooperation with large corporate customers, including HP and Siemens. In 2002, General Motors commissioned MIC to provide standardised customs software for worldwide use, which led to the development of a system covering multiple countries and supported the company's expansion as an international software provider.

In 2009, MIC began offering its products as software as a service (SaaS). By 2018, the company employed around 300 people and had offices in Austria, Germany, Switzerland, the United States and Thailand. That year, MIC also opened a location in Mexico City.

In 2024, the company moved into a new headquarters in Linz after two years of construction.

== Company structure ==
MIC Datenverarbeitung GmbH is headquartered in Linz, Upper Austria. In addition to its headquarters, the company has offices in Vienna and Salzburg. Its international locations include Schaffhausen in Switzerland, Antwerp in Belgium, Southfield, Michigan, and Vancouver, Washington, in the United States, Mexico City in Mexico, Bangkok in Thailand, and Vadodara in India.

In 2024, MIC generated revenue of approximately €70 million. As of 2026, the company has more than 550 employees.

== Products and services ==
MIC develops cloud-based software for customs and trade compliance. Its products cover customs management, tariff and export-control classification, preferential origin calculation, supplier declaration management, sanctions-list screening, data analytics and document processing. The software is also used in global trade management and supply-chain management, including the assessment of production locations and supply chains in connection with free-trade agreements. In 2026, for example, MIC released an artificial intelligence tool that reduced the processing time for customs tariff classification at Zalando by 71 per cent.

The company's customers include businesses in the automotive, mechanical engineering, electronics, textile, tobacco, consumer goods, chemical, pharmaceutical, logistics, and e-commerce sectors. By 2025, MIC served more than 1,000 companies in 55 countries. According to a 2022 article in the German newspaper Frankfurter Allgemeine Zeitung, MIC is the market leader in the area of tariff software.
