= Sinéad O'Dwyer =

Irish fashion designer

- Born: 1991 (age 34–35); Ireland
- Education: ArtEZ University of the Arts; Royal College of Art
- Label: Sinéad O'Dwyer
- Awards: Zalando Visionary Award (2024)
- Website: sineadodwyer.com

Sinéad O'Dwyer (born 1991) is an Irish fashion designer. Based in London, she founded her eponymous womenswear label in 2021, designing for women, femmes, and gender non-conforming people across a broad range of body types. Her pattern cutting uses life-casting, silicone molding, and multiple fit models rather than a single standard sample size.

In 2024 O'Dwyer won the Zalando Visionary Award and made her Copenhagen Fashion Week runway debut that August. In 2025 she was a semifinalist for the LVMH Prize. The Costume Institute at the Metropolitan Museum of Art acquired two of her pieces in 2025.

== Early life and education ==
O'Dwyer grew up outside Tullamore, County Offaly. Her father, Kevin O'Dwyer, is an artist and silversmith, her mother a classical musician originally from Chicago, and her grandmother an Aran knitter who taught her to knit and sew. At about age twelve she visited a Philip Treacy and Isabella Blow exhibition in Dublin with her father, which she has said made her fall in love with fashion.

She attended an all-girls Catholic school, an experience she has said feeds into her fascination with uniform dressing. As a teenager she spent a year in North Carolina, a period she has described as formative, when she fell in love with a girl for the first time and came out to friends and family. She studied fashion at ArtEZ University of the Arts in Arnhem, the Netherlands, graduating in 2014 with a collection titled "Dare To Eat a Peach", then worked at Alexander Wang in New York before completing an MA in fashion at the Royal College of Art in London in 2018.

== Career ==
=== 2018–2021: Graduation collection and founding the label ===
For her 2018 MA graduation show at 180 The Strand, O'Dwyer presented brightly colored silicone busts and body pieces life-cast from the bodies of friends, including the artist Jade O'Belle, instead of a conventional collection. She has connected the work to her own experiences of body dysmorphia and disordered eating, which she says she only recognized during her MA. In 2019 she was named to the Dazed 100, and her early pieces were worn by Björk, Arca, and Paloma Elsesser. In March 2020 her work was the subject of "In Myself", a solo exhibition at Waves and Archives, a New York gallery dedicated to fashion. She founded her label in 2021; until then she had supported herself in part through nannying, and her Spring/Summer 2022 collection, "Domiciliary", drew on that decade of domestic work.

=== 2022–2023: London Fashion Week debut ===
In 2022 the British Fashion Council named O'Dwyer a recipient of its NewGen support scheme, and she presented her first London Fashion Week collection that September, at the Old Selfridges Hotel. Her shows used street casting, with plus-size, pregnant, and disabled models. Her second collection, Fall/Winter 2023 "Dúil" (from the Irish word for desire), was dedicated to her late grandmother, Rita, and reworked Aran knitting techniques in satin bands and elasticated cotton. She was a nominee for the 2023 British Fashion Council Foundation Award, and a Golden Fleece Award let her buy an industrial sewing machine and casting equipment.

=== 2024: Zalando Visionary Award and Copenhagen ===
In May 2024 O'Dwyer won the Zalando Visionary Award, which came with a €50,000 prize and a guest slot on the official schedule at Copenhagen Fashion Week. Her August 2024 show there, the Spring/Summer 2025 collection "Everything Opens To Touch", was produced with the Danish Association of the Blind and the nonprofit Hair and Care: broadcaster Lucy Edwards, who is blind, walked with her guide dog, and guests received audio descriptions and tactile fabric swatches for each look. The collection, which drew on the teenage year she spent in North Carolina, added molded denim and lace-up flats made with the Japanese footwear label Grounds. The following month she restaged the collection at London Fashion Week as an immersive presentation with an experimental film by Sharna Osborne, a commissioned poem by Anastasiia Fedorova, and three couples kissing among the audience.

=== 2025: Final NewGen show, LVMH Prize, and the Barbican ===
Her Fall/Winter 2025 show at London Fashion Week in February 2025 was her last as a NewGen recipient; it included boots made with Grounds modeled on Irish dancing shoes and footwear from Puma. That year she was a semifinalist for the LVMH Prize, and the Costume Institute at the Metropolitan Museum of Art acquired two of her pieces, the 2020 "Final Jade Cast" and a Spring/Summer 2023 ensemble. In November 2025, alongside the "Dirty Looks" exhibition at the Barbican Centre, she presented "Knead", a performance devised with choreographer Grace Nicol that staged her Fall/Winter 2025 collection through dance; her sister played viola in the cast.

=== 2026: V&A Fashion in Motion ===
On 24 July 2026, O'Dwyer presented "Notice Me", a collection of fifteen garments, in the Raphael Gallery at the Victoria and Albert Museum as part of its Fashion in Motion series. Material from "Everything Opens To Touch", including its audio-described catwalk, was shown in the museum's 2025 exhibition "Design and Disability".

== Design approach ==
O'Dwyer's label designs for women, femmes, and gender non-conforming people, starting from the body rather than the standard sample size: she life-casts and molds silicone directly from individual bodies and develops her patterns over several fit models. The label sells up to a size 24, where most of her contemporaries stop at a 16. Recurring signatures include lacing derived from shibari, lattice knits, and shirting cut to accommodate larger busts.
