= Lucy Edwards =

British social media influencer, disability activist and journalist

- Years active: 2015–present

TikTok information
- Page: British blind girl 👁🦮👩‍🦯
- Years active: 2020–present
- Followers: 1.8 million

YouTube information
- Channel: Lucy Edwards
- Years active: 2014–present
- Subscribers: 838 thousand
- Views: 603 million
- Last updated: October 2025
- Website: www.lucyedwards.com

Lucy Edwards-Cave is an English influencer, disability activist, and journalist.

== Early life ==
Edwards lost sight in her right eye at age 11 due to incontinentia pigmenti, a genetic condition; she lost her remaining eyesight at age 17. She completed her A-levels at college, and dropped out of law school due to her mental health.

== Career ==
After choosing not to pursue law school further, she trained to become a journalist at the BBC through their Extend programme. In 2019, she became BBC Radio 1's first blind presenter.

In 2021, she was named as a brand ambassador for Pantene. In September 2022, she campaigned for accessibility in the entertainment industry, speaking out on the lack of audio description for television shows, films, and theatres, as well as inaccessible website design.

In May 2023, ahead of the 2023 Eurovision Song Contest, she launched a podcast for partially-sighted and blind Eurovision fans on BBC Sounds titled Eurovision Described, which was co-hosted by Abi Clarke and provided audio descriptions of the proceedings. Five months later, in October, she traveled to Japan to film content for BBC's The Travel Show. In December, she featured on a charity cover of Wizzard's "I Wish It Could Be Christmas Everyday", forming part of influencer supergroup Creator Universe to raise money for food bank charity The Trussell Trust.

In April 2024, Edwards released a memoir, Blind Not Broken. In July, she signed a book deal with Scholastic for Ella Jones vs The Sun Stealer, a middle-grade novel centering a blind protagonist. That same month, Edwards appeared in Mattel's campaign surrounding their first blind Barbie. In August, she modelled for Sinéad O'Dwyer's catwalk as part of Copenhagen Fashion Week, accompanied by her guide dog. This made her the first blind model to participate in the event.

In October 2024, Edwards was one of three winners of The Estée Lauder Companies' The Catalysts program. She aims to use the award's funding and mentorship to establish Etia London, an intentionally-accessible beauty brand.

== Social media presence ==
Edwards began posting on YouTube in early 2014 under the name Yesterday's Wishes (stylised as YesterdaysWishes). Her content included vlogs about her experiences with blindness and accessible makeup and beauty tutorials.

In 2019, Edwards appeared on Say Yes to the Dress Lancashire. She began posting on TikTok towards the start of the COVID-19 pandemic, with many of her videos going viral. In 2020, she was featured in TikTok's Creator Spotlight campaign, and their 2020 TikTok 100. In 2021, she joined TikTok's UK Creator Council. By January 2024, Edwards had 1.8 million followers.

== Personal life ==
Edwards lives in Birmingham with her former guide dog (Olga), current guide dog (Molly), and her husband, Ollie. The couple began dating when she was 17; she lost her remaining eyesight two months into their relationship. At their wedding in 2023, Edwards had her guests and husband put on blindfolds during her walk down the aisle. In late 2024, Edwards announced she would be undergoing IVF with her husband; all potential embryos would be screened for incontinentia pigmenti, as the disorder causes severe brain damage in boys. She noted this decision was not out of desire to avoid blindness itself, saying "If I was told I was going to have a baby exactly like me, who would be blind but able to thrive and have an amazing life as a disabled person, I would conceive without any worry".

== Awards and recognition ==
- 2024: winner of The Estée Lauder Companies' The Catalysts program
- 2024: Journalist of the Year at the Sense Awards (shortlisted)
