= Cecilie Thorsmark =

Danish CEO of Copenhagen Fashion Week

Cecilie Thorsmark is a Danish fashion executive who serves as the chief executive officer of Copenhagen Fashion Week, a position she has held since 2018.

In January 2020, Thorsmark introduced a framework of so-called sustainability requirements for all brands featured on the official Copenhagen Fashion Week show schedule, making it the first fashion week to implement such criteria. Though based on self-assessment by the brands themselves, the standards set measurable goals related to design practices, materials, and responsible production. The initiative has been criticised by researchers and other experts as greenwashing and misleading marketing.

In 2022, Thorsmark was listed in the Business of Fashion (BoF) 500 under the “Catalyst” category for her work on sustainability within the fashion industry. She was also included in Fast Company’s “Most Creative People in Business 2023” list, featured in WWD’s “Women in Power 2023,” and recognized by Vogue Business among its “100 Innovators” in 2024.

Thorsmark also serves as deputy chair of the European Fashion Alliance, an organization that promotes collaboration across the fashion sector. She has participated as a speaker at international forums including the Global Fashion Summit, Web Summit, and the United Nations Conscious Fashion and Lifestyle Network Annual Meeting.

Before joining Copenhagen Fashion Week, Thorsmark worked as communications director at Global Fashion Agenda and spent six years at the Danish Fashion Institute.
