= Aulgah Nato =

- Born: Aulgah Ojijo; Homa Bay County
- Citizenship: Kenya
- Education: Degree in communications from the Nairobi University
- Occupation: Fashion designer
- Organization(s): Nato Design House, a high fashion brand of womenswear and bridal wear.
- Notable work: Received the Outstanding Contribution in Fashion at Lagos Fashion Week in 2018 Partnering with international brands, such as Moët & Chandon

Aulgah Nato (born Aulgah Ojijo) is a Kenyan fashion designer. Nato is the designer behind Nato Design House, a high fashion brand of womenswear and bridal wear.

== Biography ==
Nato was born into a military family in Homa Bay County. Her mother died when Nato was 9 years old. Unsure of what she wanted to do with her career, Nato attended Nairobi University and graduated with a degree in communications. She worked internationally in public relations, but was drawn to working in fashion. Originally, in collaboration with her sister, she started reworking some of her late mother's clothes, resizing them so they would fit. She was inspired by the changes she made to her mother's wardrobe and how she could incorporate her ideas into fashion.

After living abroad, In 2016, Nato returned to Kenya and committed herself to developing a fashion line. Nato created Nato Design House and began to develop her collection, focusing on womenswear and bridal designs. Her early creations were inspired by her late mother, and the bringing fashion of the 1980s and 1990s to the modern era. The experience of reworking old clothes developed Nato's commitment to sustainability, which has been a hallmark of Nato's later designs. Other design influences of Nato's include traditional African motifs and fabrics.

In 2018, Nato received the Outstanding Contribution in Fashion at Lagos Fashion Week.q The experience encouraged her to keep building her brand, and has since exhibited at Aberdeen Fashion Week and at the Cannes Festival. Nato is known for their fashion collaborations, including partnering with international brands, such as Moët & Chandon and Miss Tourism Africa on different collections. In 2023, Nato released a ready-to-wear collection.
