= Paolina Russo =

Canadian fashion designer

- Born: Paolina Alexandra Russo
- Education: Central Saint Martins (BA, MA)
- Label: Paolina Russo
- Awards: Winner, Zalando Visionary Award (2023)
- Website: paolinarusso.com

Paolina Russo is a Canadian fashion designer based in London. She founded her eponymous knitwear label in 2020 and has designed it with French co-designer Lucile Guilmard since 2022. The label is known for its "illusion knits", which give garments a holographic, lenticular effect, and for reworking upcycled sportswear. In 2023, Russo was a finalist for both the LVMH Prize and the Woolmark Prize, and won the inaugural Zalando Visionary Award.

== Early life and education ==
Paolina Alexandra Russo grew up in Markham, Ontario, a suburban city near Toronto, where she took part in competitive dance and trained in taekwondo. She made her own clothes out of found objects and donated sports equipment. She moved to London in 2013 to study at Central Saint Martins, completing a Foundation Diploma in Art and Design before continuing to the BA Fashion program, where she specialized in knitwear. During her placement year, she interned at Maison Margiela in Paris under John Galliano, working closely with him on the Artisanal team; Galliano later named her one of his "new muses".

Her 2018 BA graduate collection, "I Forgot Home", repurposed sneakers, socks, and shin guards into sneaker corsets and minidresses, and won the L'Oréal Professionnel Young Talent Award. Russo continued to the school's MA program and presented her MA collection at the Central Saint Martins graduate show during London Fashion Week in February 2020.

== Career ==
Russo founded her eponymous label in 2020. In 2022, French designer and fellow Central Saint Martins graduate Lucile Guilmard joined the brand as co-designer. The label is part of the support and mentorship program of 1 Granary, the London fashion platform.

=== Adidas ===
Russo began working with Adidas while still a student: in 2019, she was one of three London-based designers in a group showing with the brand during Paris Men's Fashion Week, presenting knit takes on its performance wear and turning the Super Court Trainer into a boot. Her Fall/Winter 2019 collection was shown at Paris Fashion Week in partnership with Adidas and was picked up by SSENSE. A full collection, adidas Originals by Paolina Russo, was released worldwide on September 17, 2020.

=== Roblox ===
In 2023, Russo and Guilmard partnered with the tech platform SKNUPS on three looks from the label's Fall/Winter 2023 collection for the online game Roblox. The capsule premiered at Dover Street Market in London and included virtual versions of the brand's materials and accessories, plus hair and makeup looks from its Spring/Summer 2024 show.

=== Copenhagen Fashion Week ===
The label presented its debut runway show at Copenhagen Fashion Week in August 2023, on the official schedule slot that came with the Zalando Visionary Award. The 23-look Spring/Summer 2024 collection, titled "Monolithics", mixed spliced technical knitwear, gradient laser-etched denim, and printed second-skin jersey, and was made without hardware, from biodegradable mono-fiber cotton yarns.

== Design approach ==
The label's signature "illusion knits" use a machine-knitting technique with a lenticular effect: seen straight on, a garment looks like a striped jumper, while an image appears as it moves. Russo has worked with Loop Studio, knitwear specialists in Peckham, since her student days to replicate hand techniques on industrial knitting machines, and the label now programs the graphics for its knits from Photoshop. Alongside the knits, the brand works with upcycled sports equipment and natural materials; a capsule made with natural-dye artisan Cavan Jayne used 100 percent merino wool colored with natural dyes.

== Awards ==
In 2023, the label was one of nine finalists for the LVMH Prize, selected from 22 semi-finalists. It was also a finalist for that year's Woolmark Prize. In June 2023, the label won the inaugural Zalando Visionary Award, which came with a 50,000 euro prize and a slot on the official show schedule of Copenhagen Fashion Week that August. Russo and Guilmard were named to the 2024 Forbes 30 Under 30 Europe list in the Art & Culture category.
