= Port Harcourt International Fashion Week =

Nigerian fashion industry event

- Status: active
- Genre: clothing and fashion exhibitions
- Frequency: Annually
- Venue: Aztech Arcum
- Location: Port Harcourt, Rivers State
- Country: Nigeria
- Years active: 2013 – present
- Inaugurated: 2013
- Most recent: September 2013
- Next event: September 2014
- Major events: Meet & Greet; Exhibitions; Fashion Shows; Workshops; Fashion Competitions
- Organiser: Neo Mantra Ltd and Bruno Creazioni Company
- Website: nativeandvogue.com

Port Harcourt International Fashion Week (alternatively known as Native & Vogue) is an annual clothing and fashion event held in the oil capital of Nigeria, Port Harcourt.

This event, a part of fashion in Nigeria, first took place in 2013 and it continues to be jointly organized by Neo Mantra Ltd and Bruno Creazioni Company. The event lasts three days. Its principal sponsor is the Rivers State government.

The Fashion Week is intended for local and international fashion models and designers to display their talents. It also provides emerging designers a platform to develop their creative expressions.

Since its initiation in 2013, the annual event has showcased several of Africa's top designers such as Paul Van Zyl, Adebayo Jones, Frank Osodi, Ituen Basi and Mai Atafo.

Former Miss World, Agbani Darego has served as host for the international exhibition.

== See also ==
- List of fashion events
