= Omoyemi Akerele =

Nigerian businesswoman (born 1978)

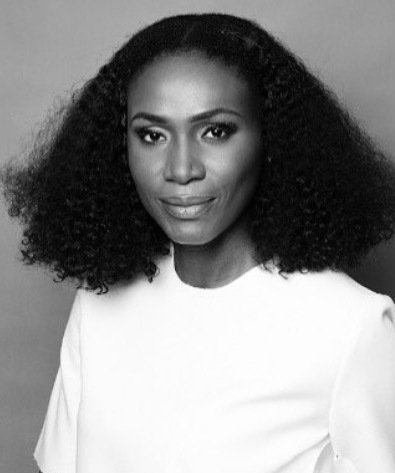
- Born: 13 May 1978 (age 48); Lagos, Nigeria
- Education: University of Lagos; University of Warwick
- Occupation: Businesswoman
- Known for: CEO of Lagos Fashion Week
- Awards: Outstanding Contribution to African Fashion, AFI Fashion Awards (2014), Business of Fashion's Global 500 (2017 - ), Zero Non Oil Ambassador for Nigeria (2021)

Omoyemi Akerele (born 13 May 1978) is a Nigerian executive, businesswoman and entrepreneur. She is the founder and CEO of Lagos Fashion Week, Style House Files and special advisor to the Nigerian Export Promotion Council (NEPC). She has several advisory positions including Industrie Africa and Jendaya, and has been an advisor to the MoMA, the Victoria & Albert Museum, UN, British Fashion Council and State of Fashion Netherlands.

== Career ==
Akerele was born in Lagos, Nigeria. She gained a bachelor's degree in Law from the University of Lagos and a Master's degree in International Economic Law from the University of Warwick. From 2000 to 2003, she worked at the Nigerian law firm Olaniwun Ajayi & Co.

In 2004, she left the law industry to focus her efforts on establishing and promoting the Nigerian apparel and textile industry. In 2004, she founded the consultancy Exclusive Styling with Bola Balogun, and they styled celebrities for TV shows including Big Brother, Idols West Africa and Deal or No Deal. Akerele was from 2005 to 2010 fashion editor of the fashion, beauty and lifestyle magazine for black women True Love.

In 2008, she founded Style House Files, a fashion business development agency that primarily focuses on accelerating the Nigerian and African Fashion Industry. She has collaborated with the Nigerian Export Promotion Council (NEPC) on initiatives to strengthen the Nigerian fashion industry's capacity to produce garments commercially and help the retail footprint across the world.

In 2011, she launched Lagos Fashion Week which is an annual four day event showcasing Nigerian and African fashion. Based in Lagos, it is Africa's largest clothing trade show and brings together designers, buyers, manufacturers and the media. More than 60 African designers are represented and over 12.000 people visit each season. Akerele has in particular pushed the agenda for sustainability and craftsmanship through initiatives such as Woven Threads and Green Access. She has also worked with international fashion weeks to give African brands the opportunity to showcase, including London Fashion Week and Pitti Immagine.

She was in 2017 on the advisory committee for exhibition Items: Is Fashion Modern? at the Museum of Modern Art (MoMA). The exhibition featured African designers including Loza Maléombho and African textiles including Kente cloth, African inspired textiles like real Dutch wax, and Dashiki from Lagos. Akerele also spoke about the global impact of African fashion at the accompanying MoMA Live conference.

She was in 2021 named Zero Oil Ambassador for Nigeria by the CEO of the Nigerian Export Promotion Council & President ECOWAS TPO Network, Mr Olusegun Awolowo, and given a five hundred million Naira grant to support thirty brands in the fashion industry.

In 2022, runway footage from Lagos Fashion Week was featured in the Victoria & Albert Museum's exhibition Africa Fashion and several African designers, photographers and creatives were exhibited, among them Thebe Magugu and Kenneth Ize. Omoyemi Akerele gave the keynote address at the private view and was an advisor to the curatorial team.

Akerele has spoken at international conferences including Business Of Fashion (BOF) Voices, Global Fashion Agenda's Copenhagen Fashion Summit, Conde Nast International Luxury Conference, The Museum of Modern Arts New York Items Conference, etc.

== Personal life ==
Akerele is married to Tokunbo Akerele, a Nigerian executive and board member. They have three daughters and live in Lagos, Nigeria.

== Awards and honours ==
- Business of Fashion's Global 500 list, 2017, 2018, 2019, 2020, 2021, 2022
- Outstanding Contribution to African Fashion, AFI Fashion Awards, 2014
- Zero Non Oil Ambassador for Nigeria, 2021
