= Shade Thomas-Fahm =

Nigerian fashion designer (born 1933)

- Born: Victoria Omọ́rọ́níkẹ Àdùkẹ́ Fọlashadé Thomas; 22 September 1933 (age 93)
- Occupation: Fashion designer
- Notable work: Shade's Boutique

Shade Thomas-Fahm (born Victoria Omọ́rọ́níkẹ Àdùkẹ́ Fọlashadé Thomas; 22 September 1933) is a Nigerian fashion designer, who is regarded as the first Nigerian modern fashion designer. Best known for pioneering African fashion in Nigeria, she was celebrated at London's Victoria and Albert Museum in 2022.

== Biography ==
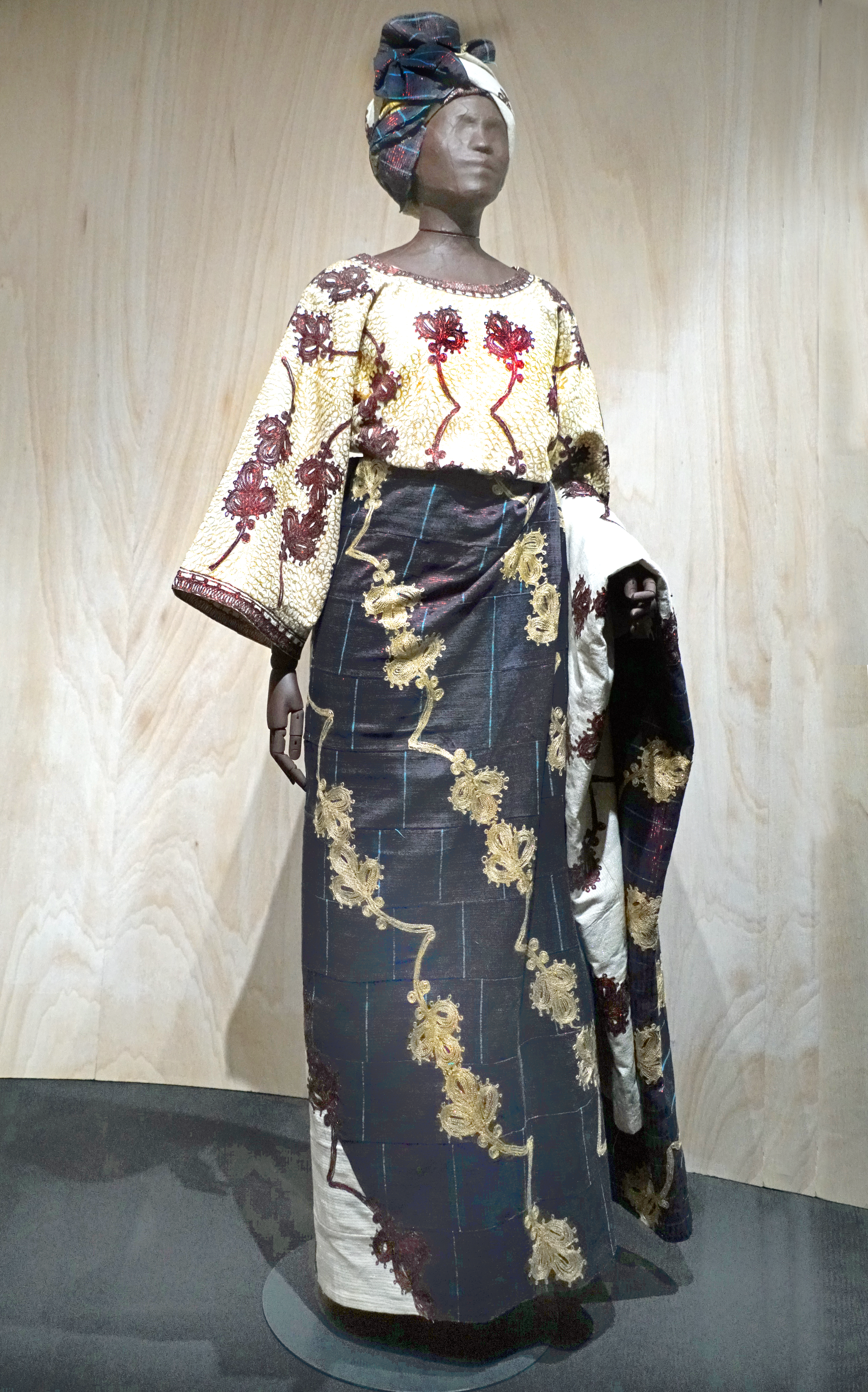

Thomas-Fahm was born on 22 September 1933 to parents of Yoruba descent. Her father was Bankole Ayorinde Thomas and her mother, Elizabeth Olaniwun Thomas. She attended St. Peter's School in Faaji and also Baptist Girls' School, Araromi and New Era Girls' Senior Secondary School, Surulere, Lagos. In the summer of 1953, she left Nigeria for England to become a nurse. Taking instead to fashion in London, she enrolled into Saint Martin's School of Art, where she studied fashion designing and was the first Nigerian woman to do so. She worked briefly as a fashion buyer at Simpson's of Piccadilly before returning to Nigeria.

According to Thomas-Fahm, she returned to Nigeria "to provide jobs for people and tackle unemployment". She encountered problem convincing the natives to buy local fabrics and use traditional designs because the British cultural influence in Nigeria was not countered then.

Thomas-Fahm popularised the use of hand-dyed adire and aso oke in ready-to-wear styles. In the 1960s, she founded the Shades Boutique. It started with the Maison Shadé, which she opened in 1960 in Yaba, Lagos. Thomas-Fahm influenced her contemporaries from the 1970s, including Abah Folawiyo, Betti O, Folorunsho Alakija, and Nike Davies-Okundaye.

== Legacy ==
Thomas-Fahm specialized in the use of locally woven and dyed textiles to make modern contemporary styles that became known in Nigeria and around the world. She transformed iro and buba into a wrapper skirt; and the creation of the 'ajuba now popularly known as the 'boubou' form men's agbada.

She served as president of the Fashion Designers Association of Nigeria (FADAN), using her platform to mentor upcoming designers and advocate for culturally rooted, sustainable fashion. She was the president of the Rotary Club of Victoria Island from 2009 to 2010.

Thomas-Fahm was the first fashion designer to open a fashion boutique in Nigeria.
