= Zalando =

Multinational e-commerce company specializing in shoes and fashion

Zalando SE

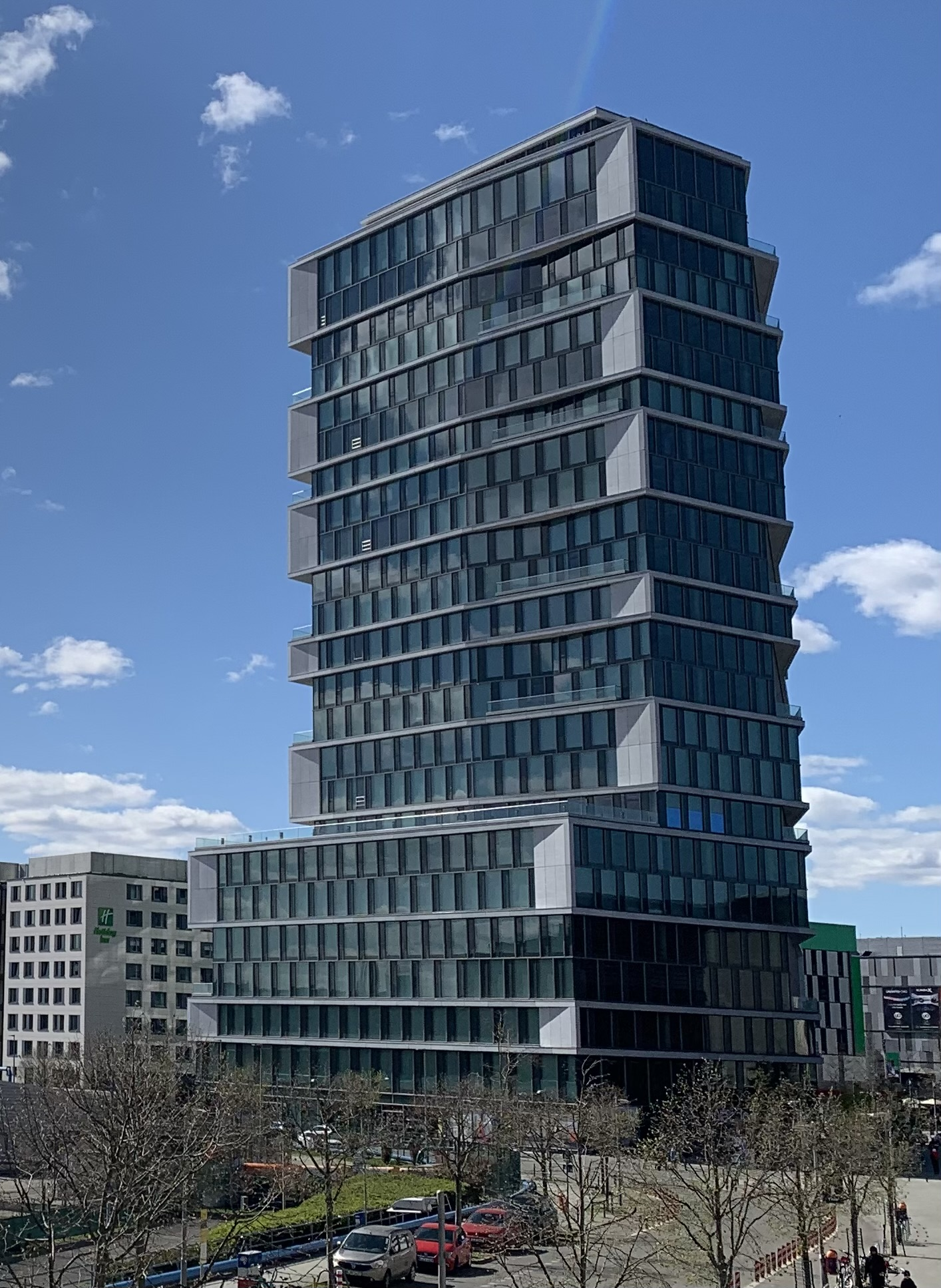
- Stream Tower, headquarters of Zalando in Berlin
- Type: Public (Societas Europaea)
- Traded as: FWB: ZAL; DAX component
- ISIN: DE000ZAL1111
- Industry: E-commerce
- Founded: October 2008; 18 years ago
- Founders: Robert Gentz; David Schneider
- Headquarters: Berlin, Germany
- Area served: Europe
- Key people: Robert Gentz (co-CEO); David Schröder (co-CEO)
- Services: Online shopping
- Revenue: ▲€12.3 billion (2025)
- Operating income: ▼€387 million (2025)
- Net income: ▼€213 million (2025)
- Total assets: ▲€9.26 billion (2025)
- Total equity: ▲€2.83 billion (2025)
- Number of employees: 16,582 (2025)
- Subsidiaries: About You; Zalando Lounge; Tradebyte; Anatwine; Fision
- Website: zalando.com

Zalando SE is a German multinational e-commerce company headquartered in Berlin, specializing in fashion, beauty, and footwear. It is Europe's largest online fashion retailer. Founded in 2008 by Robert Gentz and David Schneider, the company has expanded its operations to 30 European markets, currently serving a customer base of 62 million active users.

Beyond its primary multi-brand online shopping platform, which includes its own private label brands, Zalando operates the shopping club Lounge by Zalando, maintains physical outlet stores in Germany, and provides logistics and marketing services for retail partners. In November 2025, Zalando finalized the acquisition of its competitor About You, making it a wholly-owned subsidiary. As of 2025, the company generated revenues of €12.3 billion and employed approximately 16,500 people.

== History ==
Zalando was founded in 2008 by Robert Gentz and David Schneider in Berlin with investment capital from the three Samwer brothers. Gentz, Schneider and Oliver Samwer met each other through their studies at WHU – Otto Beisheim School of Management.

Inspired by US online retailer Zappos, Zalando initially specialized in the sale of footwear. The name of the company was derived from the Spanish word for shoes (zapatos).

In 2010, the company launched in the Netherlands and France and added apparel to its portfolio. In 2011, it opened online retail sites in the UK, Italy, and Switzerland. In the following year, Zalando expanded to Sweden, Denmark, Finland, Norway, Belgium, Spain, and Poland. In 2012, Zalando began operating outside of Germany offering deliveries to Austria.

Since 2013, following examples of tech companies from the East, especially China, Zalando transitioned into a European digital platform. Emulating Chinese companies, Zalando set off into remaking itself into a digital shopping mall, allowing fashion houses and retailers to make sales via the Partner Program as well, often with limited input from Zalando.

In 2014, Zalando was listed on the Frankfurt Stock Exchange. Since 22 June 2015, Zalando has been included in the MDAX. In 2015, Zalando started collaborating with Topshop and began selling merchandise online. Advertisements featuring model Cara Delevingne were broadcast in Germany, Switzerland, and France.

In June 2015, the fashion trade fair "Bread & Butter" was acquired by Zalando, with the intention to open the globally important event to a broader audience as a "fashion festival". The first edition of "Bread & Butter by Zalando" took place in 2016, hosting 20,000 visitors at Arena Berlin. Zalando announced the discontinuation of "Bread & Butter" due to a shift in strategy two years later.

In March 2017, Zalando acquired Kickz, a German company, for an unknown sum. At the time, Kickz owned 15 shops across Germany, all specializing in basketball footwear. In 2018, Zalando launched Beauty in Germany, Poland, and Austria and opened a beauty concept store in Berlin offering a regularly changing range of beauty products. In February 2018, Zalando expanded its collaboration with physical retailers in Germany. In June 2018, Zalando expanded its operations to Ireland and Czechia. The markets are served over the existing logistic sites of Zalando.

In October 2020, a German works council with 31 members was elected for the first time at Zalando. In December 2020, co-CEO Rubin Ritter announced that he would be stepping down next year, two years before the end of his contract, to allow his wife to pursue her professional ambitions. In June 2021, the company announced that it would give all of its 14,500 workers an extra 5 days off work in August, in recognition of their work throughout the coronavirus pandemic. In September 2021, the DAX was expanded to 40 companies, with Zalando becoming part of the DAX. In November 2022, Zalando discontinued its standalone resale app, Zircle. The pre-owned category on its platform will continue to allow customers to sell and buy second-hand fashion from each other.

In its 2023 sustainability report regarding ESG and sustainable fashion, Zalando stated it made progress ahead of schedule in reducing its greenhouse gas emissions, and that a majority of its partners had adopted science-based targets. However, the company missed several of its other environmental goals. It failed to achieve its planned complete phase-out of single-use plastic packaging, and fell short of its targets regarding product life extension and increasing the overall share of inventory made from recycled, organic and natural fabrics.

In March 2024, the company announced a share buyback of up to 100 million euros ($109 million) and the opening of its logistics platform (logistics network, software and related services) to work with other companies. Meanwhile, the platform may also work with other categories besides fashion.

In December 2024, Zalando announced the acquisition of its competitor About You, along with its subsidiary Scayle, for approximately €1.13 billion (€6.50 per share). Following regulatory approval, the transaction closed in July 2025. In November 2025, Zalando finalized its acquisition of About You, taking full ownership of the company and delisting it from the Frankfurt Stock Exchange.

In 2025 Zalando adjusted its return policy, reducing the time between purchase and a free return from 100 to 30 days for customers in Germany, the Netherlands and Italy. In April 2025 Zalando announced a change in the terms of service, to allow an estimated 0.02 percent of its customer base, who have been identified to abuse the return system, to be banned from making new orders for one year.

In January 2026, Zalando announced it would close its fulfilment centre in Erfurt, Germany by the end of September 2026, affecting around 2,700 employees.

== Geographical presence ==
Countries in which Zalando operates as of August 2026

As of July 2026, Zalando operates in 30 European markets. The company primarily utilizes a centralized logistics network to serve these regions, allowing for cross-border fulfillment.

=== Market entry timeline ===
Year	Market(s)
2008	Germany
2009	Austria
2010	France, Netherlands
2011	Belgium, Italy, Switzerland, United Kingdom
2012	Denmark, Finland, Norway, Poland, Spain, Sweden
2013	Luxembourg
2015	Ireland
2018	Czechia
2021	Croatia, Estonia, Latvia, Lithuania, Slovakia, Slovenia
2022	Hungary, Romania
2025	Greece, Portugal
2026	Bulgaria

Zalando also provides services to Liechtenstein (via its Swiss platform) and Monaco (via its French platform), leveraging the existing logistics and infrastructure of its neighboring national markets.

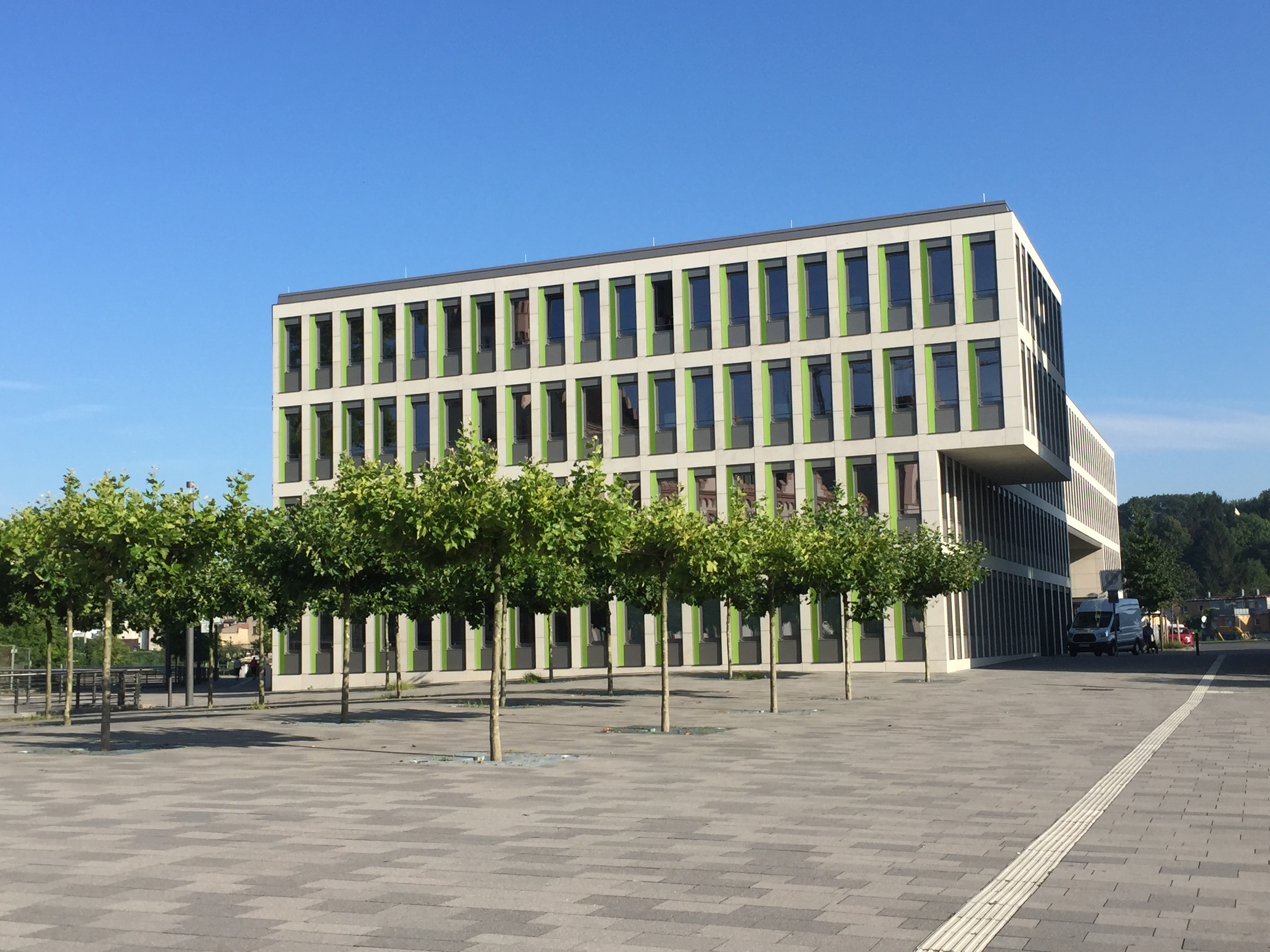
IT centre Lake Phoenix Dortmund

== Business figures ==
Zalando was accumulating losses ever since it was founded until it started making a profit in 2014. The most important cost factors for Zalando are fulfilment and marketing costs, both taking up 50% of total revenues alone without the costs of sales included, with marketing costs as high as 25% in 2010. Zalando managed to become profitable for the first time in 2014, which was due to cost management and sales in their additional markets. Almost 50% of sales revenues are generated in Germany, Austria, and Switzerland which is defined as one geographic unit under "DACH".

In 2021, the company was said to be targeting a gross merchandise volume (GMV) of over €30bn by 2025, and in the long term wants to take more than 10% of the €450bn European fashion market.

The key trends for Zalando are (as of the financial year ending 31 December):

Year	Revenue (€ bn)	Net profit/loss (€ m)	Number of employees	Ref.
2010	0.15	−20		
2011	0.51	−60		
2012	1.1	−90		
2013	1.8	−120		
2014	2.2	82	7,588	
2015	2.9	107	9,987	
2016	3.6	216	11,998	
2017	4.4	215	15,091	
2018	5.3	173	15,619	
2019	6.4	225	13,763	
2020	7.9	421	14,194	
2021	10.3	235	17,043	
2022	10.3	17	16,999	
2023	10.1	83	15,793	
2024	10.6	251	15,309	
2025	12.3	213	16,582	

=== Shareholder structure ===
As of 1 July 2026, the company's voting rights are distributed among several major institutional investors and the founders. The majority of the voting rights, representing 51.91%, are held by other shareholders.

The major shareholders are as follows:

Major shareholders as of 1 July 2026
Shareholder	Voting rights
Anders Holch Povlsen	10.83%
MFS Investment Management	7.25%
BlackRock	5.61%
Founders*	5.41%
Goldman Sachs	5.09%
Morgan Stanley	4.73%
Boston Partners	3.53%
Norges Bank	3.22%
Treasury shares	2.41%

* Aggregate shareholding of the founders, based on Director's Dealings as of 14 October 2024.

== Zalando Visionary Award ==
In 2023 Zalando established the Zalando Visionary Award, in partnership with Copenhagen Fashion Week. The award is chosen by a jury of industry experts and recognizes "designers and brands with a visionary approach to creating meaningful change within the fashion industry". The winner receives a prize of €50,000 as well as an opportunity to present their collection at the August fashion show.

Winners of the Zalando Visionary Award include:

- 2023: Paolina Russo
- 2024: Sinéad O'Dwyer
- 2025: IAMISIGO

== Controversies ==
The German newspaper Bild reported on statements of the German Federal Economic Ministry indicating that from 2007 to 2012 Zalando received around 3.3 million euro in subsidies from regional development programs. Zalando also requested subsidies for 2013. The Deutsche Mittelstandsnachrichten reported that the Samwer brothers’ business model is predicated on using foreign capital and cheap labour to quickly build up a company, selling it as fast as possible.

In July 2012, German TV channel ZDF broadcast a report on the packing and distribution centre operated for Zalando by a provider near Berlin. The report showed the appalling working conditions at the company providing logistical services to Zalando. In the logistical center of Großbeeren certain staff, who often commute more than 200 km per day from nearby Poland, are not allowed to sit down during their working day. It was further shown that employees were subject to continuous scrutiny, work space was extremely confined, and for several hundreds of employees there was only one filthy toilet container. The ZDF also criticized the hourly wage of €7.01, which was nonetheless in conformity with the minimum hourly wages for agency workers in Germany. Following the ZDF report, it was revealed that Zalando had also received a 22.5 million euro subsidy from the government of Thüringen to build new headquarters. According to a ZDF reporter who went undercover, around 40 employees are being paid by the taxpayer between seven and nine days every month in the framework of apprenticeship programs, while one-third of the employees are agency workers. Following the report, Zalando announced that it would scrutinize its service providers more strictly.

In April 2014, RTL broadcast the documentary Unrelenting pressure in the workplace (Arbeiten unter Dauerdruck), which had been made with the support of undercover journalist Günter Wallraff. The documentary led to renewed criticism on the labour conditions at Zalando. Journalist Caro Lobig worked undercover for three months as an order picker in the logistical center at Erfurt. During an eight-hour shift she had to walk up to 27 kilometres (17 mi). After five weeks she started to suffer from circulation problems. According to an anonymous employee working at the ambulance service, there is hardly a day when they are not called to the logistics center. According to a labour judge interviewed by RTL, Zalando violates German Labour law because of its rules on breaks, by prohibiting its employees from sitting down and by imposing airport-security-type measures on its employees. Through its tight control over its employees, Zalando would also be in violation of privacy rules. RTL requested Zalando to give comments to the allegations but Zalando refused. Instead, Zalando filed a complaint against Lobig for revealing corporate secrets. Lobig in turn filed a complaint against the company regarding her severance pay.

In November 2015, the Centre for Protection against Unfair Competition in Germany filed a suit claiming that Zalando misled consumers on the availability of certain products suggesting that they needed to act fast to buy them. Zalando said that they had already changed their marketing practices, taking the centre's concerns into account. They claimed that they no longer informed consumers that there were "three items available" when more than three were available.

== See also ==
- E-commerce
- Online shopping
