= Lagos Fashion Week =

Annual international trade show in Nigeria

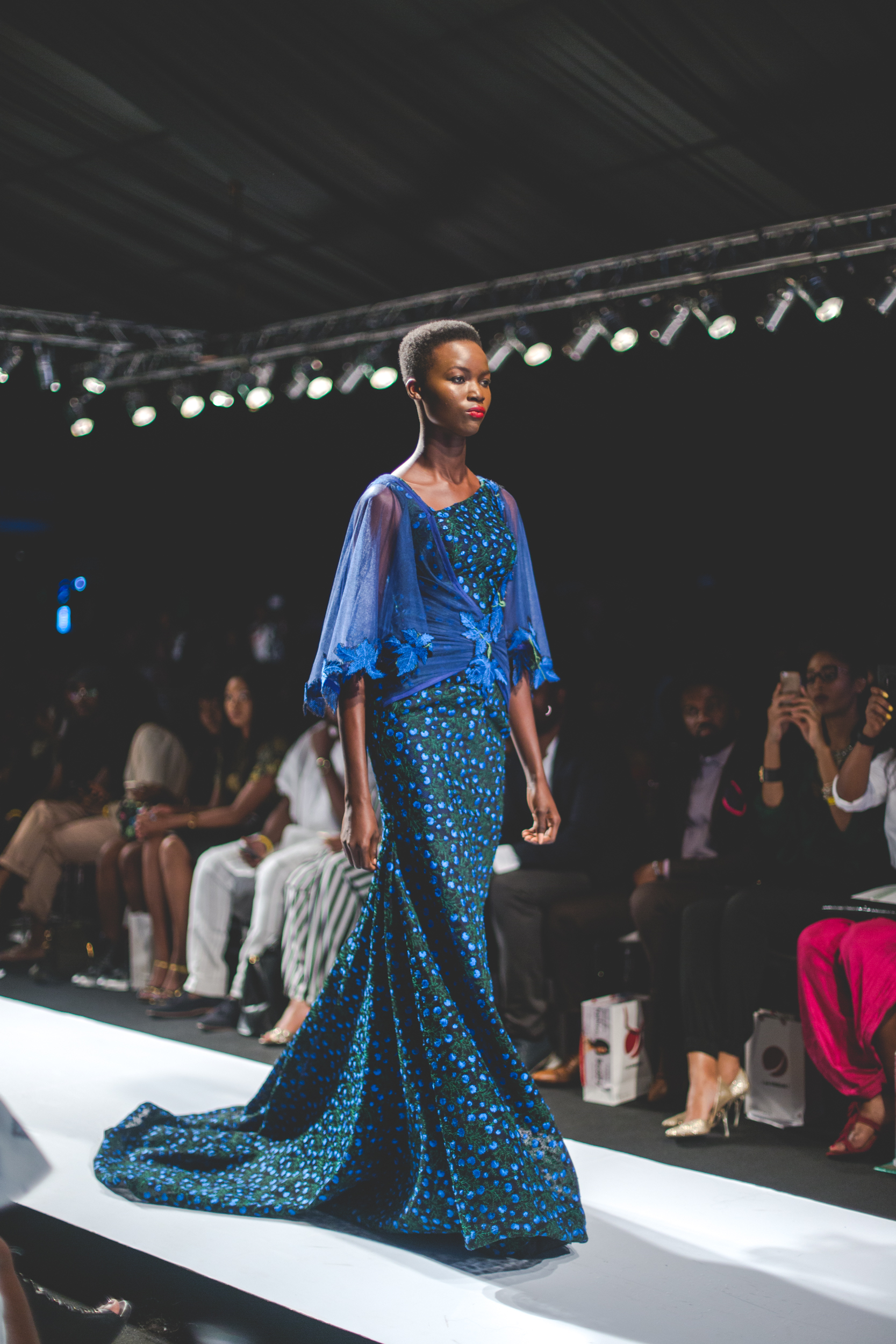
- Genre: Fashion catwalk shows and surrounding events
- Frequency: Annually
- Locations: Lagos, Nigeria
- Inaugurated: 2011
- Founder: Omoyemi Akerele
- Organiser: Style House Files
- Website: lagosfashionweek.ng

Lagos Fashion Week (LagosFW) is an annual multi-day clothing trade show that takes place in Lagos, Nigeria. It was founded in 2011 by Omoyemi Akerele and it is Africa's largest fashion event drawing considerable media attention, nationally and internationally. It showcases over 60 Nigerian and African fashion designers to a global audience of more than 40,000 retailers, media and consumers. It has helped propel African designers and fashion brands, such as Orange Culture, Lisa Folawiyo and Christie Brown to international recognition.

== History ==
Lagos Fashion Week was founded in 2011 by Omoyemi Akerele and is produced by fashion business development agency Style House Files. The event aims to give the Nigerian and African fashion industry international recognition, by bringing together media, buyers, manufacturers and consumers. As a leading fashion event on the international fashion calendar, Lagos Fashion Week includes runway shows, showroom presentations and an online platform LagosFW Digital. Lagos Fashion Week also hosts a number of initiatives, talk series and competitions including Woven Threads, Fashion Focus Africa, Fashion Business Series, Green Access and the Visual Makers Fellowship. Lagos Fashion Week has worked with international fashion weeks to give African brands the opportunity to showcase, and collaborated with the British Council, London Fashion Week, Nigerian Export Promotion Council (NEPC) and Pitti Immagine.

The 2011 inaugural event was hosted in Lagos and presented more than 40 designers including Lisa Folawiyo, Nkwo, Maki Oh and Bridget Awosika. In the same year, The Fashion Focus Fund (formerly Young Designer of The Year) was established as an annual competition aimed at developing the next generation of emerging Nigerian fashion talent. The year-long incubator programme was created to assist designers in establishing the right structure and practices to facilitate scalability, sustainability and business growth. Past beneficiaries include Orange Culture, IAMISIGO, Kenneth Ize, Emmy Kasbit and Ejiro Amos Tafiri.

Heineken Nigeria has since 2015 been the official title sponsor of Lagos Fashion Week. In the same year, the competition and runway show Green Access was established to raise awareness amongst Nigerian students of the need to make sustainable choices in the fashion industry.

In 2017, founder Omoyemi Akerele was on the advisory committee for exhibition Items: Is Fashion Modern? at the Museum of Modern Art (MoMA). The exhibition featured African designers including Loza Maleombho and African textiles including Kente, African inspired textiles like real Dutch wax, and Dashiki from Lagos. Akerele also spoke about the global impact of African fashion at the accompanying MoMA Live conference.

In 2019 the event received more than 30 designers from all over the world.

In 2020 during the Covid-19 pandemic, the Woven Threads initiative was launched focusing on driving the industry towards a circular fashion economy in Africa. A talk series and physical showroom have addressed how the continent can embrace traditional textiles, waste management and the role technology plays in a new creative and sustainable fashion industry. Expert sessions have included Orsola De Castro, Bandana Tewari, Dana Thomas, Jumoke Oduwole, Nike Ogunlesi, Sarah Diouf and Yegwa Ukpo. Sponsored by Heineken, a Design Challenge gave designers the opportunity to engage with the creative community from home, celebrating innovative and sustainable design in Africa.

In 2021, Omoyemi Akerele was named Zero Oil Ambassador for Nigeria by the CEO of the Nigerian Export Promotion Council & President ECOWAS TPO Network, Mr Olusegun Awolowo, and given a five hundred million Naira grant to support thirty Nigerian brands in the fashion industry.

In 2022, runway footage from Lagos Fashion Week was featured in the Victoria & Albert Museum's exhibition Africa Fashion and several African designers, photographers and creatives were exhibited. Akerele gave the keynote address at the private view and was an advisor to the curatorial team.

== Designers ==
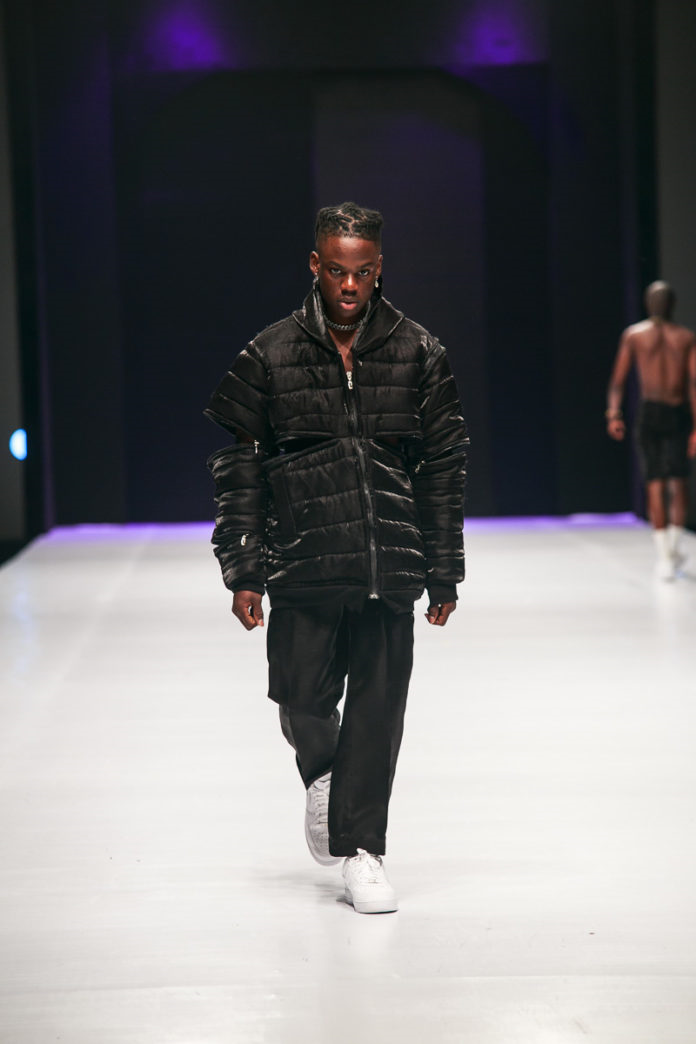
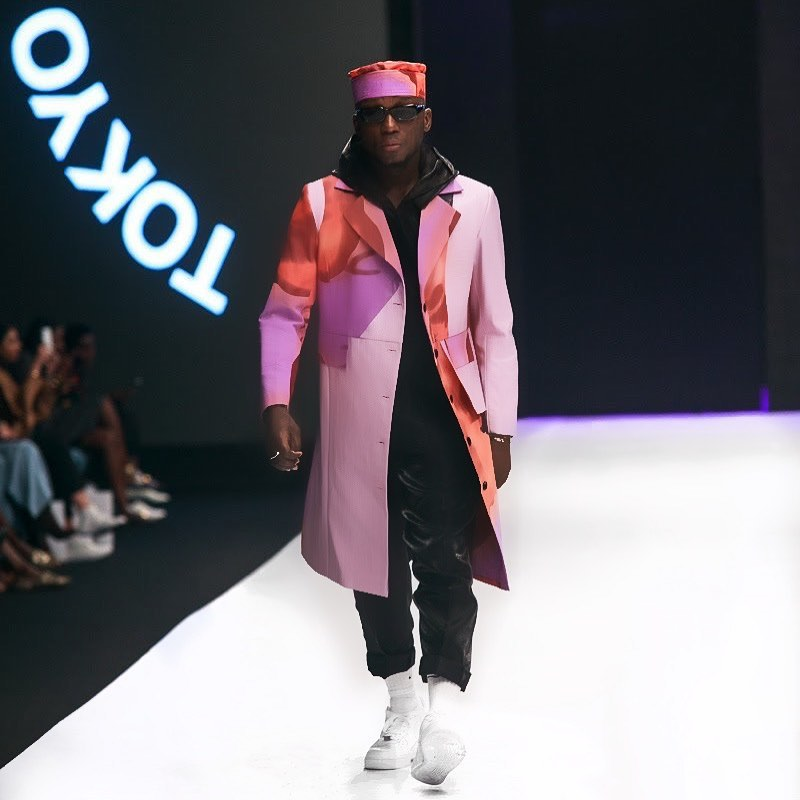
(left) Rema and Spinall (right) modeled for Tokyo James

The runway show schedule has presented a number of designers including:

- Andrea Iyamah
- Anyango Mpinga
- Assian
- Awa Meite
- Bloke
- Bridget Awosika
- Bubu Ogisi
- Chiip O Neal
- Christie Brown
- CLAN
- Cynthia Abila
- Deola
- DNA by Iconic Invanity
- DZYN
- Ejiro Amos Tafiri
- Eki Silk
- Elie Kuame
- Emmy Kasbit
- Fruche
- Gozel Green
- Haute Baso
- House of Kaya
- IAMISIGO
- Idma Nof
- Imad Eduso
- Jermiane Bleu
- JZO
- Kelechi Odu
- Kiki Kamanu
- Kiko Romeo
- Laduma by Maxhosa
- Lagos Space Programme
- Larry Jay
- Lisa Folawiyo
- Loza Maleombho
- Mai Atafo
- Maki Oh
- Maxivive
- Meena
- Moofa Moshions
- Nao.Li.La
- Niuku
- Nkwo
- Odio Mimonet
- Onalaja
- Orange Culture
- Post Imperial
- Rich Mnisi
- Rick Dusi
- Selly Raby Kane
- Sindiso Khumalo
- Sisiano
- Studio 189
- Style Temple
- Sunny Rose
- TJWHo
- Tongoro
- Tokyo James
- Tsemaye Binitie
- Ugo Monye
- Washington Roberts

== See also ==
- List of fashion events
- Fashion week
