= Ituen Basi =

Nigerian fashion designer

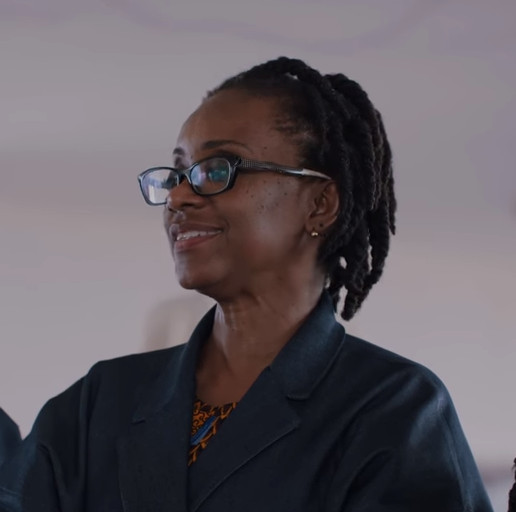
- Born: Ituen Bassey
- Education: Obafemi Awolowo University and London School of Fashion
- Occupation: fashion designer
- Known for: designs for musicals and catwalk

Ituen Bassey trading as Ituen Basi is a Nigerian fashion designer. She has created costume designs for musical theatre as well as creating catwalk shows. She has worked in the UK and in Nigeria.

== Life ==
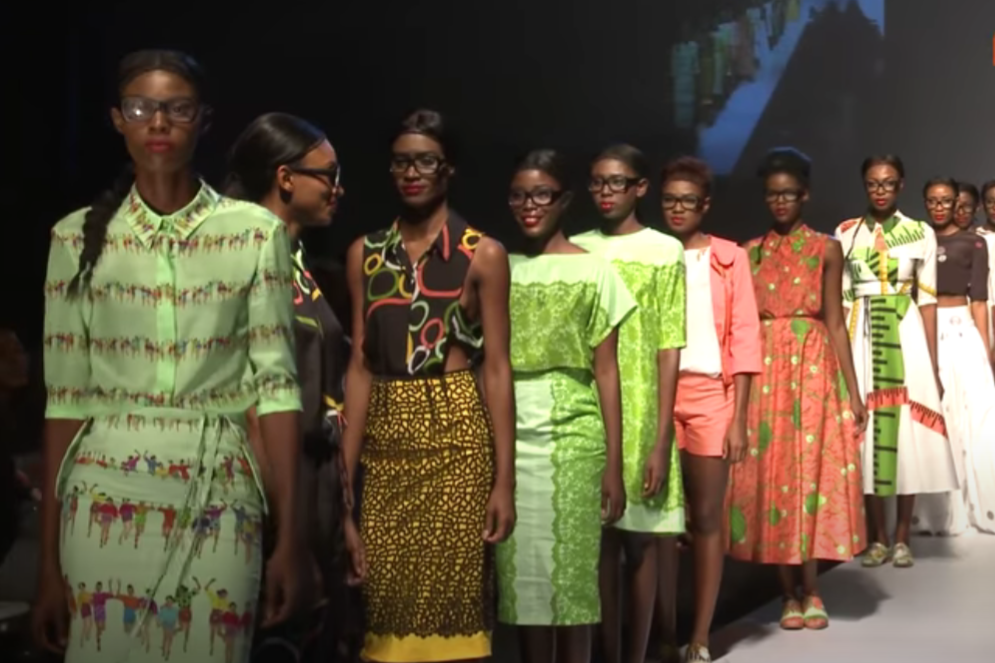
Ituen Basi designs at Lagos Fashion Week in 2014

Bassey graduated in Nigeria in Theatre Arts at Obafemi Awolowo University before studying at the London School of Fashion. She has worked as a designer in England and in Nigeria. She did costume designs for the musicals 'Coloured Girls’, ‘HearWord’ and ‘Saro the Musical’. She started her (almost) eponymous label in 2006 which was Ituen Basi. She is known for her use of Ankara wax print fabric.

In 2019 she was unveiling her new collection at the Arise Fashion Week in Lagos where she was described as a "design veteran".

== Awards include ==
The Ankara and Beads collection earned her “The Most Innovative Designer” award in 2009 and the following year she created the Independence collection. This show gained her the “Emerging Designer of the Year, Africa” award at the Africa Fashion Week, Johannesburg. The Love Series collection made her the “Most Creative Designer” at Arise Magazine Fashion Week and the Double Take collection made her Designer of the Year, Africa during the 2012 Mercedes Benz Fashion Week Africa in Johannesburg.
