= Danish Fashion Institute =

- Abbreviation: DAFI
- Formation: 2005
- Headquarters: Copenhagen, Denmark
- Chief Executive: Eva Kruse
- Website: danishfashioninstitute.dk

Danish Fashion Institute (DAFI) is a non-profit trade group for the Danish fashion industry founded in 2005. Its main goal is to promote Danish fashion design in both Denmark and internationally. Organising the twice-yearly Copenhagen Fashion Week is one of the primary activities.

== Organisation ==
Danish Fashion Institute is a subsidiary of the self-owning foundation Design Society. The organisation is based in Fæstningens Materialgård at Frederiksholms Kanal 30 in Copenhagen.

Danish Fashion Institute's membership organisation DAFI s Netværk merged with Dansk Mode & Tekstil in 2015.

== Activities ==
Fashion Forum

Fashion Forum is an internet media with news from the Danish fashion industry.

Copenhagen Fashion Week

DAFI's first big initiative was the establishment and development of Copenhagen Fashion Week, which had previously only existed as a trade fair event. Today, Copenhagen Fashion Week is an established international event with a show schedule of more than 40 shows, five fashion fairs, 2,400 brands exhibited and hundreds of activities for both professionals and the general public.

Other initiatives

Besides the above projects, DAFI works to strengthen the industry's competitiveness through knowledge-sharing workshops, seminars and conferences on topics like CSR, internationalization, business competencies, market trends and innovation.

As such, DAFI coordinated the Danish political initiative Modezonen, a collaboration with the Danish Chamber of Commerce, The Trade Council of Denmark, Danmarks Designskole, Teko, KEA, Copenhagen Business School and Danish Design Centre. The purpose of Modezonen was to create a shared platform and prepare the fashion industry for global competition while making Denmark a significant fashion player and putting Copenhagen on a par with leading fashion metropolises. In February 2010, Modezonen launched fashionforum.dk, a medium for the Danish fashion industry with articles, forums and job ads.

== Nordic Fashion Association and NICE ==
In 2008, DAFI created a pan-Nordic fashion network with Nordic Fashion Association in collaboration with its sister-organizations in Sweden, Norway, Finland and Iceland. Nordic Fashion Association runs the sustainability project NICE (Nordic Initiative, Clean and Ethical) which supports and motivates fashion companies to integrate environmentally sustainable and socially responsible practices into their design and business models.

In December 2009, DAFI and Nordic Fashion Association contributed to the United Nations Framework Convention on Climate Change (COP15) by gathering 650 fashion industry professionals, experts and NGOs from across the globe in a conference that brought up visions and challenges for a sustainable fashion industry. Another NICE conference was held in May 2012 with more than 1,000 participants.
