= Wrap reel =

Device for measuring yarn

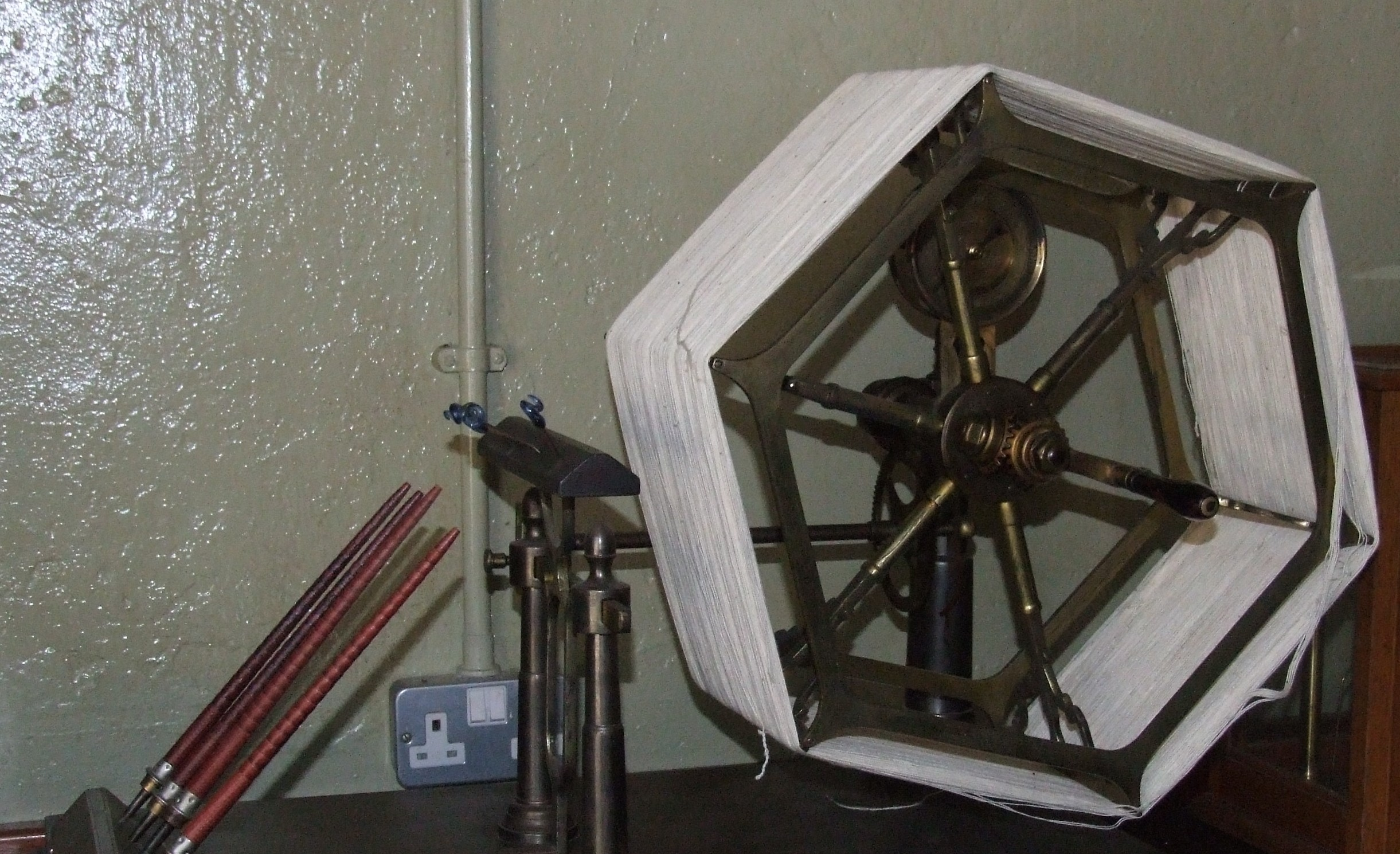
A wrap reel on display in Helmshore Mills Textile Museum, made by Goodbrand of Manchester to measure cotton.

A wrap reel or skein winder is a device for measuring yarn and making it into hanks of a standard size. The reel is of a standard size and its revolutions are counted as the yarn is wrapped around it. Typically, a set number of revolutions will be used so that the hank is of a standard size—skein or lea. For example, a skein of cotton would be 80 turns on a reel of 54 inches (140 cm) circumference, making 120 yards (110 m), while the standard length for wool worsted would be 80 yards (73 m).

The tension of the yarn as it was wound onto the reel was important because natural fiber yarn is elastic, and so a standard tension was required to ensure uniformity. For a given reel, this would be determined by the friction of the setup and so the test hanks would be made and measured in other ways to calibrate the device.

The Science Museum in London has an 18th-century wrap reel in its collection which was made for Richard Arkwright's first cotton mill in Derbyshire. It is kept in their storage archive at Blythe House.

== See also ==
- Swift (textiles)
