= Beater (weaving) =

Weaving tool used to push the weft yarn securely into place

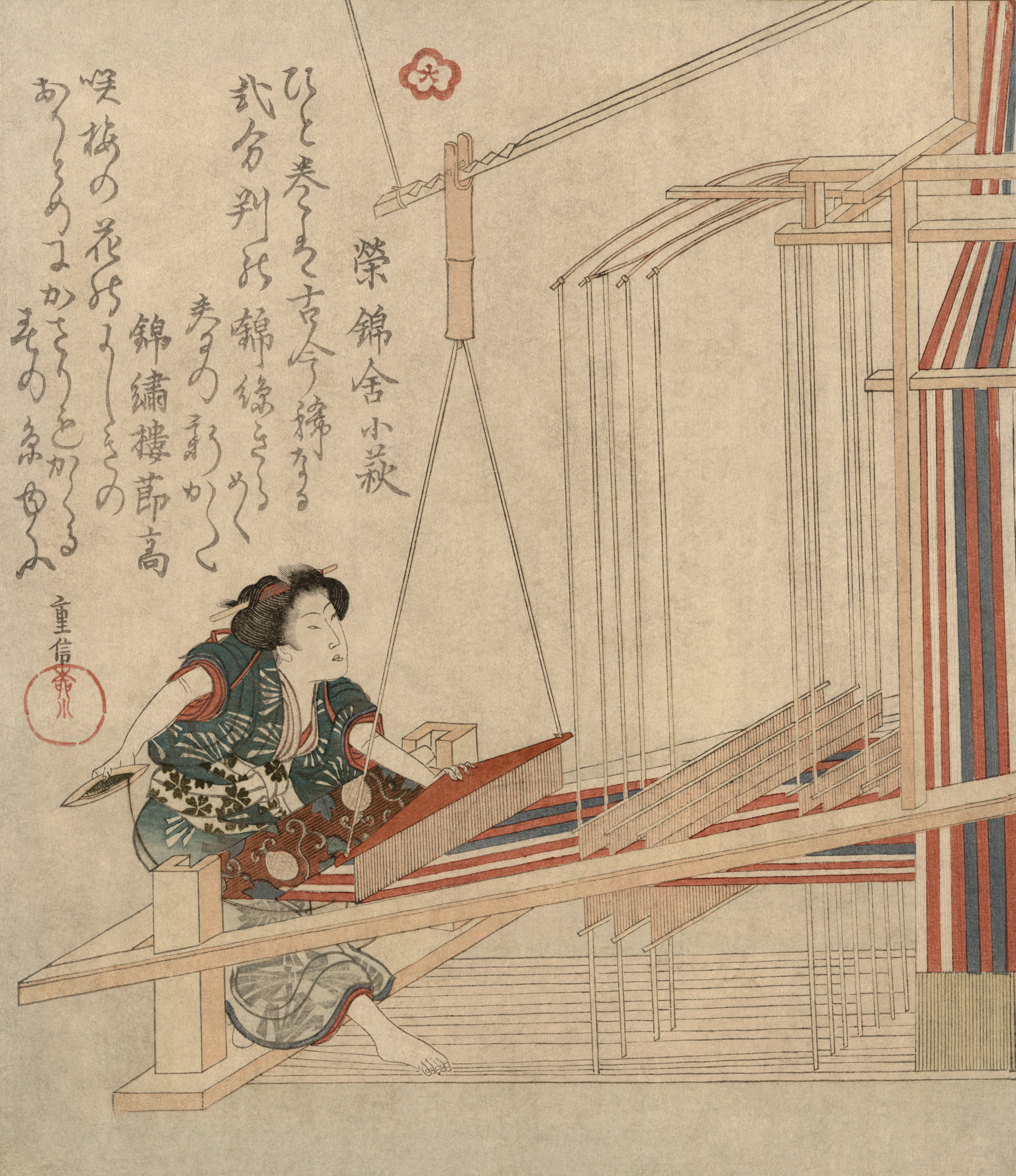
A Japanese weaver using a beater, mounted from a notched pole and suspended overhead. Woodcut print by Yanagawa Shigenobu, 1825–1832.

A beater or batten, is a weaving tool designed to push the weft yarn securely into place. In small hand weaving such as Inkle weaving and tablet weaving the beater may be combined with the shuttle into a single tool. In rigid heddle looms the beater is combined with the heddles. Beaters appear both in a hand-held form, and as an integral part of a loom.

Hand beaters must have enough mass to force the weaving into place, so they come in a variety of weights and sizes. Some may have lead inserts to provide additional heft for a smaller beater, and some are made entirely from metal.

Loom beaters typically take the form of a bar mounted across the loom. The actual beating is done by a metal insert known as a reed, which contains a number of slots, known as dents, which the warp threads pass through. This is the more common form, as floor looms and mechanized looms both use a beater with a reed.

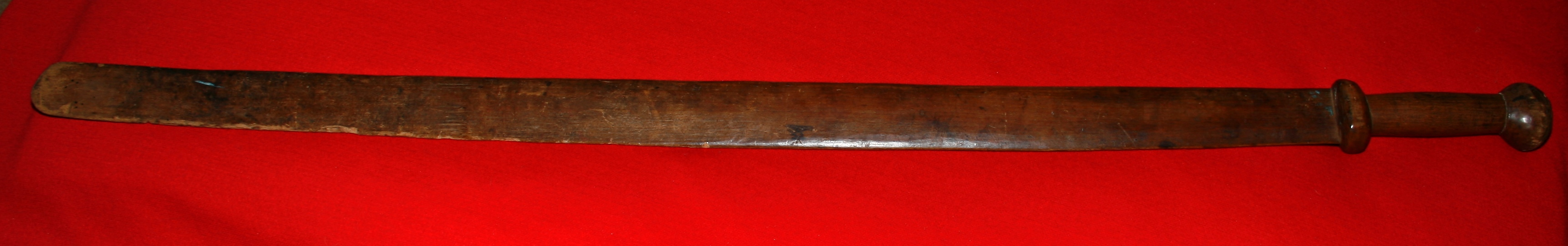
Coast Salish sword beater, North American west coast

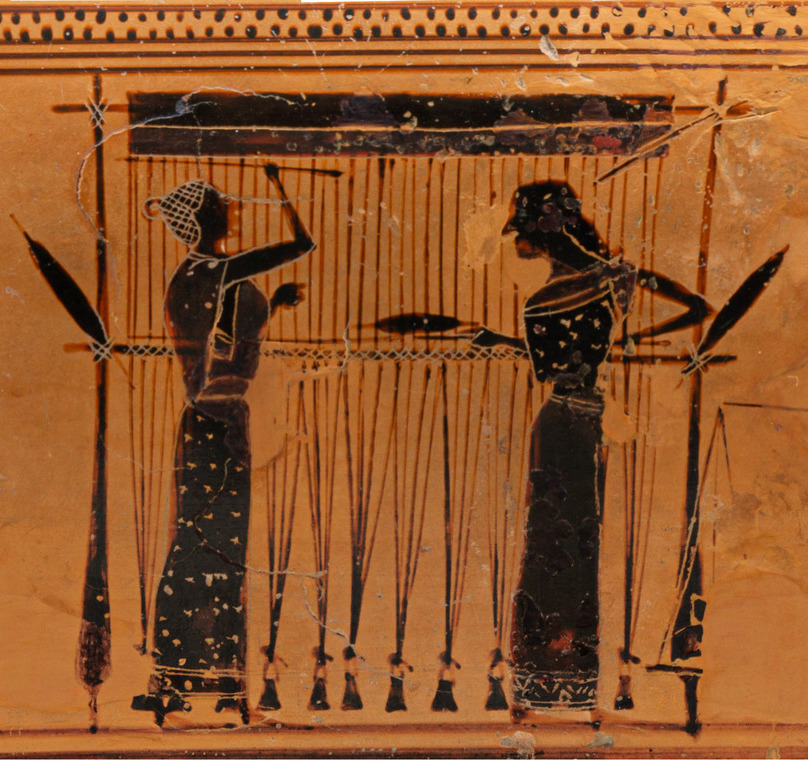
Sword beaters (or battens) on upright looms are indeed swung like a sword

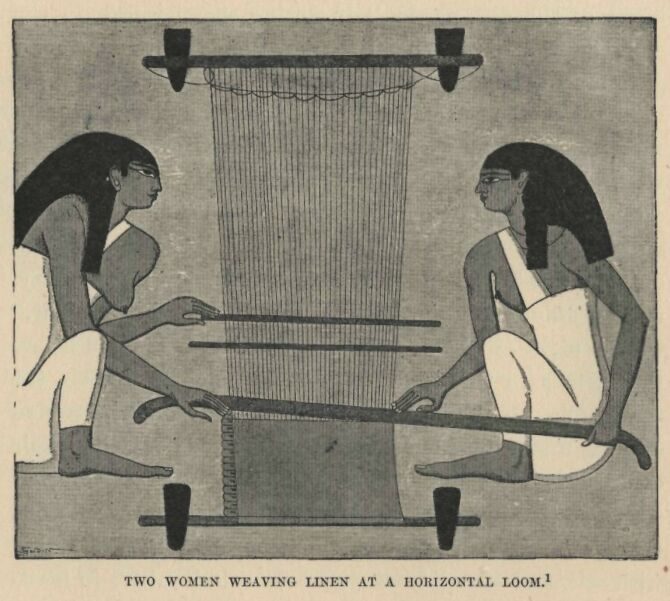
Sword beater on an Ancient Egyptian horizontal ground-pegged loom, being held by two people

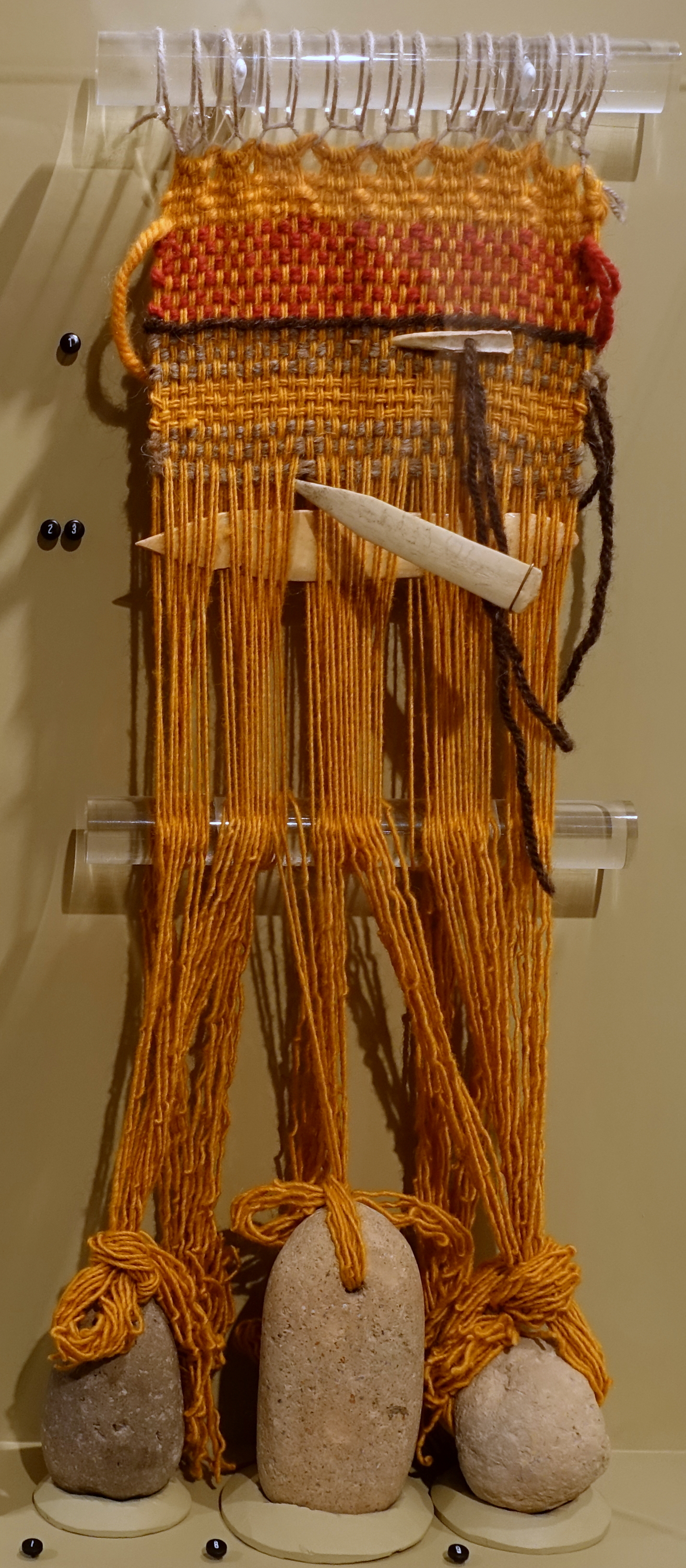
Bone sword beater (2) and adjacent bone pin beater (3), Iron age, Middle East

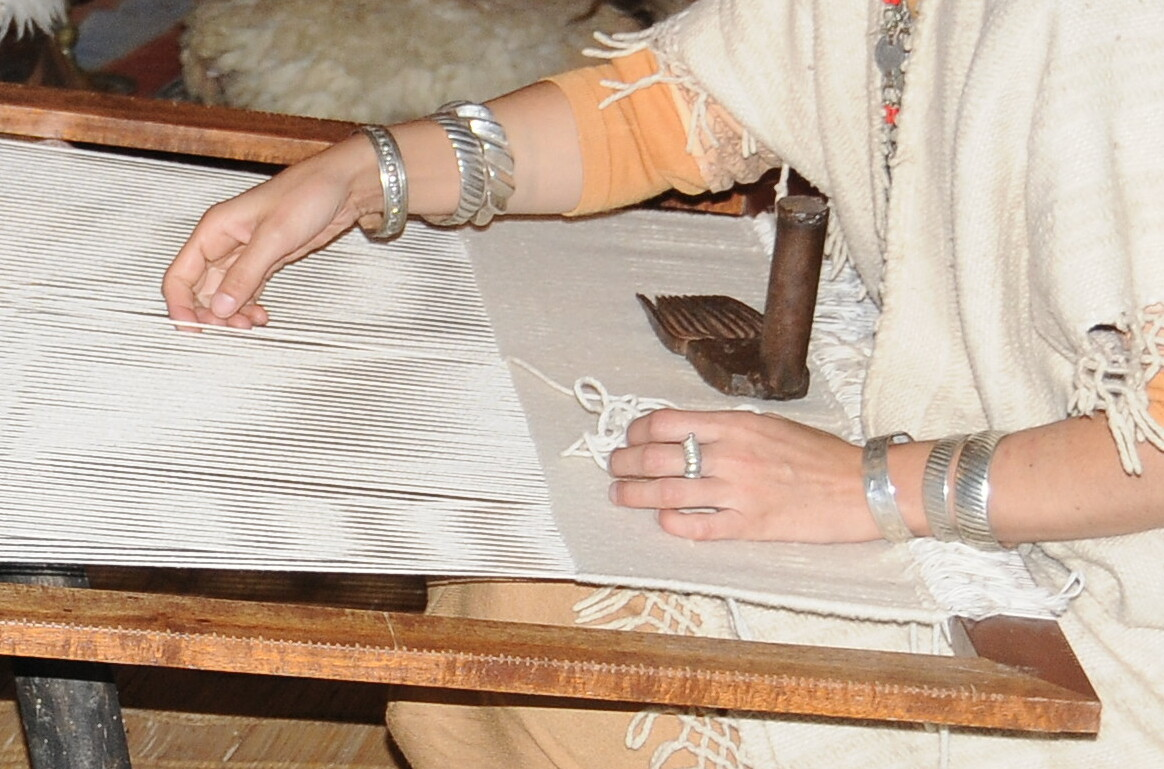
Weaving comb used for battening, Braga, Portugal

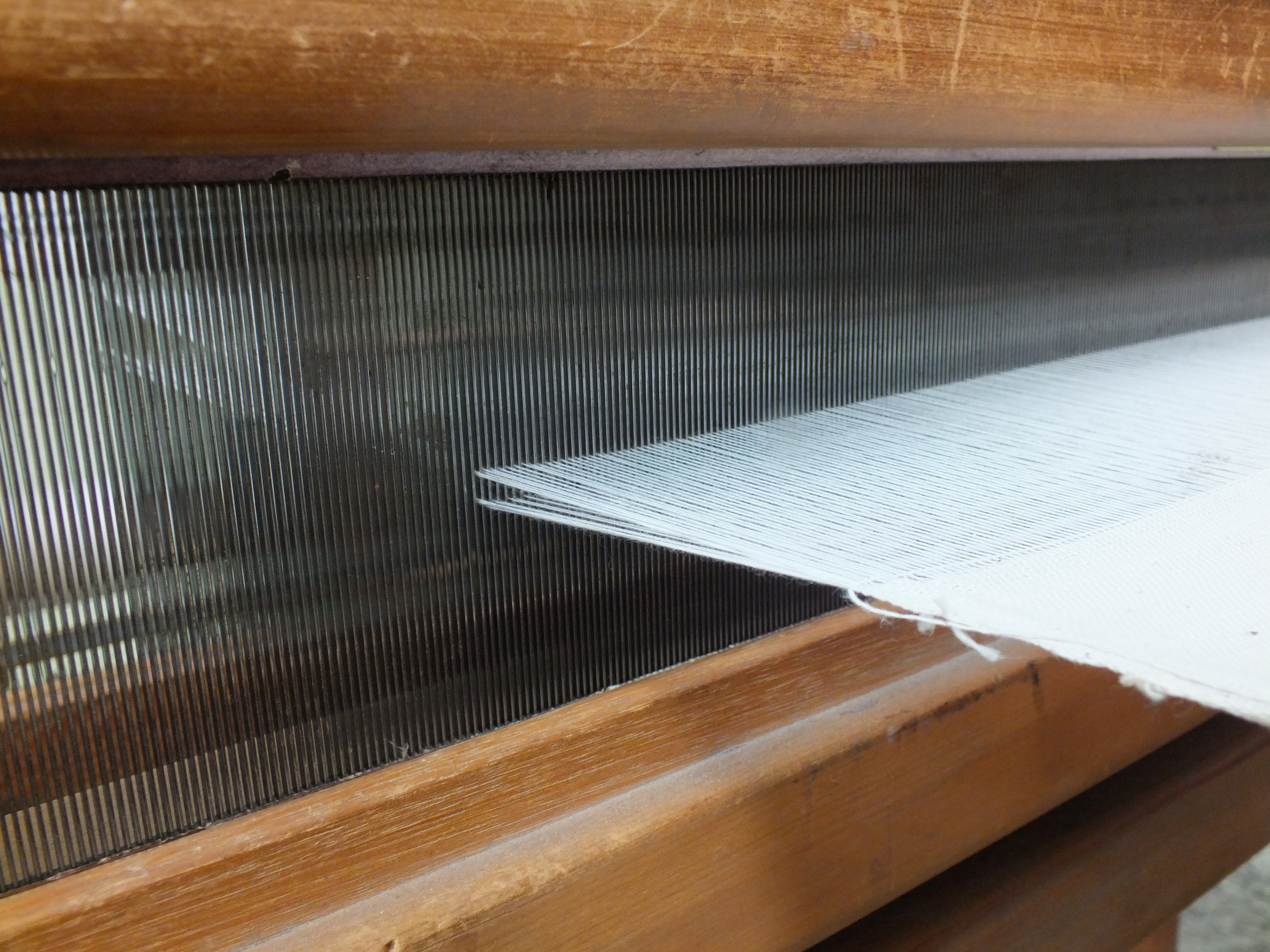
Reed beater mounted in a beater bar

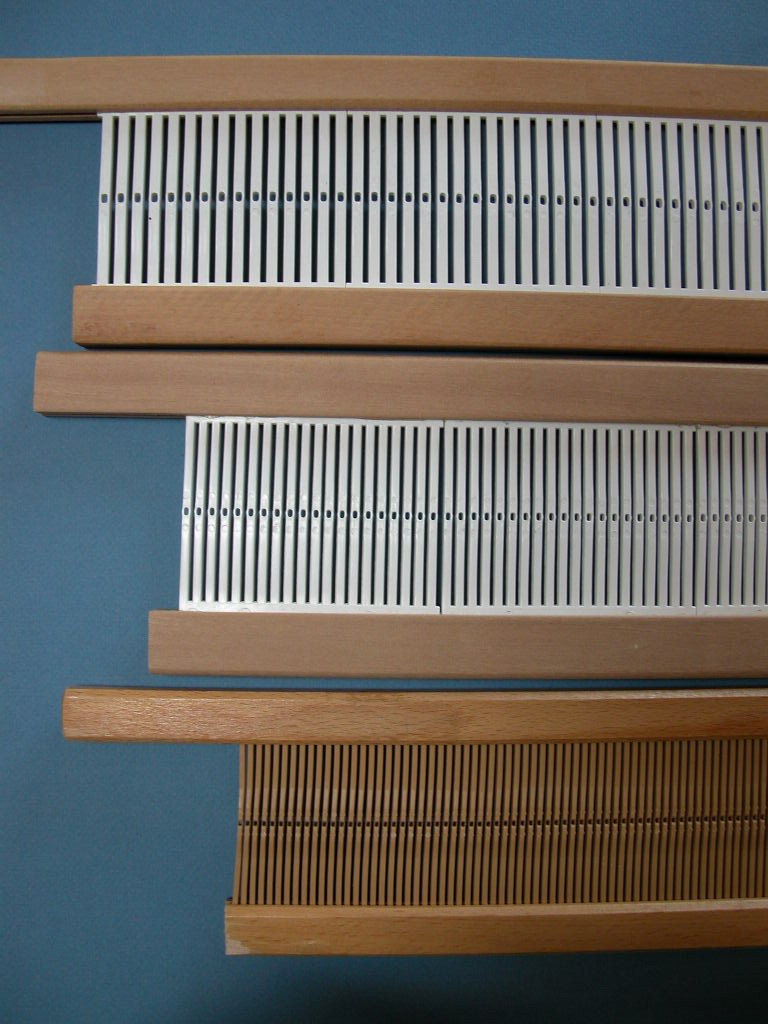
Rigid heddles are a shedding device that can also act as a reed.

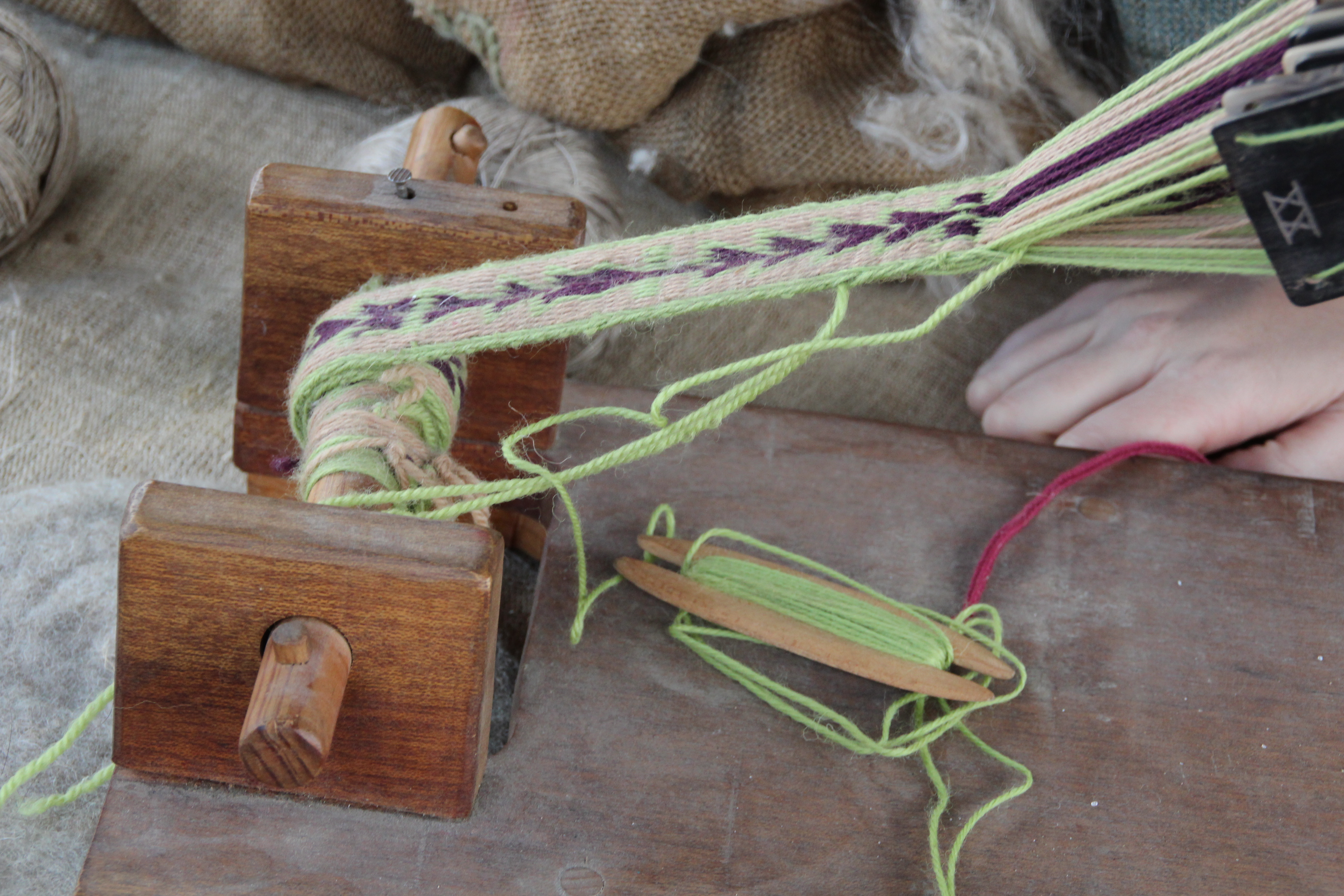
Belt or band shuttle, a short shuttle used for inkle weaving. This extra-sturdy shuttle is also used at a batten, to beat the newly woven weft against the previously woven fell.

== See also ==
- Loom
