= Iniye Tokyo James =

British-Nigerian fashion designer

- Education: Queen Mary University of London
- Label: Tokyo James
- Awards: Finalist, LVMH Prize (2022)
- Website: tokyojames.co.uk

Iniye Tokyo James is a British-Nigerian fashion designer and the founder of the menswear label Tokyo James, which he established in 2015. He is known for tailoring in which construction methods associated with Savile Row are applied to fabrics, colors, and decorative motifs drawn from Nigeria.

The label has appeared on the Milan Fashion Week calendar since the Autumn/Winter 2021 season. In 2022, James was one of eight finalists for the LVMH Prize for Young Fashion Designers.

== Early life and education ==
James has said that he was born and raised in the United Kingdom in an African household. He studied mathematics at Queen Mary University of London and did not train formally as a fashion designer.

== Career ==
=== Styling and publishing ===
Before turning to design, James worked as a stylist and fashion director. He directed digital campaigns for Brioni, Issey Miyake, and Puma Black Label, and founded the digital magazine Rough UK, which was later extended to Italian and American editions.

=== Tokyo James label ===
James founded his eponymous line in 2015, describing its purpose as making visual sense of his own heritage and opening a dialogue between two places that appeared to have little in common. He runs a studio in Lagos that also houses other designers, photographers, stylists, and a modeling agency, and has kept the label's production in Nigeria rather than relocating it to the United Kingdom, citing the effects of emigration on the country's creative industries. The brand added a womenswear line in 2022.

=== Milan Fashion Week ===
Tokyo James made its Milan debut for the Autumn/Winter 2021 season. The label's first runway show in the city took place in February 2022. In September 2022 the label showed a women's-only collection.

For Fall/Winter 2023, James presented a collection titled "Code Switch", which used vegan leather, upcycled denim, and knitwear made in South Africa, and included a collaboration with Dr. Martens. His Fall/Winter 2024 show, "Expansion", was staged at the Palazzo Visconti di Modrone in Milan around a commissioned installation by the Lagos artist Yusuff Aina; the two said they wanted to challenge assumptions about the art and fashion produced in Nigeria. After a period away from the schedule, the label returned to the Milan calendar in September 2025.

== Design approach ==
James introduces gender-fluid elements into menswear shapes and combines traditional and contemporary Nigerian dress. The label's ruched "Ato Rodo" handbag is named after the scotch bonnet chili used in Nigerian cooking. James has produced garments and accessories in both animal hide and synthetic leather, has said that at least 30 percent of each collection is made from deadstock fabric, and has worked with Nike on a line of bags and footwear made from used sneakers and soccer boots. His clothes have been worn by the musicians Burna Boy, Naira Marley, and Ghetts, the last of whom wore a custom suit by the label to the Brit Awards.

Speaking about the fashion industry in Milan, James has argued that short-term support for emerging designers, such as small cash prizes or brief mentorships, is insufficient, and that stronger infrastructure is needed to help them build lasting businesses.

== Recognition ==
In March 2022, James was named one of eight finalists for the LVMH Prize for Young Fashion Designers, selected from 20 semi-finalists drawn from about 1,900 applicants. The prize was awarded that June to Steven Stokey-Daley of S.S. Daley.

In 2023, James was a finalist in the Guest Country category of the Fashion Trust Arabia prize, which that year featured Nigeria; the award went to Adeju Thompson of Lagos Space Programme. His designs were shown the same year in the exhibition Africa Fashion at the Brooklyn Museum in New York.
