= Bubu Ogisi =

Nigerian artist and curator (born 1987)

Bubu Ogisi (born 1987 in Lagos, Nigeria) is a Nigerian fibre artist, multidisciplinary artist, fashion designer, and curator whose work explores identity, materiality, spirituality, and indigenous textile production in West African societies.

== Early life and education ==
Bubu Ogisi grew up in multiple cities globally, including London, Lagos, Accra, and Paris. She holds a Bachelor of Science degree in Computer Science from Regent University, Accra, Ghana, and a Master of Arts in Fashion Business from Ecole Superieure des Art et Technique de la Mode (ESMOD) in Paris, France.

== Artistic practice ==
Ogisi's work aims to decolonize the mind and question inherited socio-political narratives, particularly those related to post and neo-colonialism. She creates wearable art and installation pieces using organic and unconventional fibres, integrating ancient textile traditions from the African continent. Her art manipulates elements such as gravity, light, color, mass, and transparency to express the infinite transformations and materiality iterations of the body and textiles. This approach foregrounds themes of rawness, anti-finishing (as a critique of Eurocentrism), and functionality

Her oeuvre examines identity, memory, and transcendence, weaving indigenous knowledge systems together with contemporary aesthetics to reflect the complex histories of the African diaspora. Ogisi also uses her platform to question subjects like religion, gender, traditional symbolism, tribal identities, magic, and ecological futures.

== Professional roles and collaborations ==
Ogisi is the creative director of IAMISIGO, a contemporary womenswear brand that embodies her artistic and cultural concerns. She is also a member of the art collective hFACTOR. Her work has been exhibited in several contemporary art venues, including a collaboration with Tamibé Bourdanné shown at the FNB Art Joburg Fair in 2024.

== Selected exhibitions ==
- 2025: Recipient of the Zalando Visionary Award
- 2025: ART X Fair
- 2025: Dirty Looks: Desire and Decay in Fashion, Barbican, London
- 2024: I.AM.ISIGO, Digital Mystery System, Ars Electronica, Linz
- 2024: Synthetic Dreams & Obsession as Practice, FNB Art Joburg, 16/16 Gallery, Johannesburg
- 2023: Biennale für Kunsthandwerk und Design, Tel Aviv
- 2023: New Material, Gallery 1957, Accra
- 2022: You Can't See Me, CCA Lagos Fashion week
- 2022: I am Not Myself, Tetley, Leeds
- 2022: Spirituality in Materiality, Art X Lagos
- 2022: Afrika Fashion, Victoria and Albert Museum, London
- 2019: Play as Creation, Bubu Ogisi and Yadichinma Ukoha-Kalu, ART x, Lagos
- 2019: unVeiled, Kunstgewerbemuseum, Berlin/ Art Summit Nigeria, 2019.
- 2016: Fashion Cities Africa, Brighton Museum, Brighton

== Fashion(Selected) ==
- Copenhagen Fashion Week – IAMISIGO SS26 Show
- Lagos Fashion Week – Spring 2026
- Victoria's Secret – VS20 House of Lagos / Campaign
- Gods of the Wilderness" collection
- Bonde la Vivuli / Valley of Shadows
- CONFECTIONS × COLLECTIONS (Cape Town)

== Archives ==
- Victoria & Albert Museum, London, UK
- Fondation d’Entreprise Martell, Cognac, France
- Barbican Centre, London, UK
