= Lisa Folawiyo =

Nigerian fashion designer

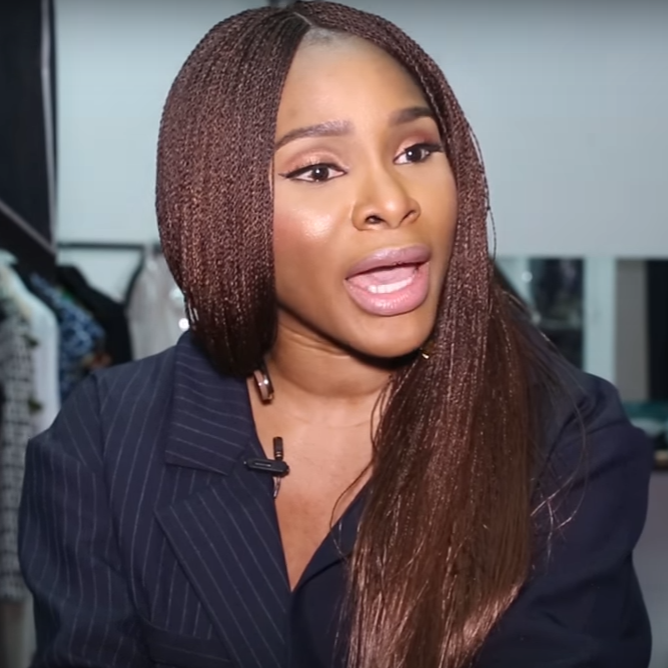
- Born: Lagos, Nigeria
- Citizenship: Nigerian
- Education: University of Lagos (Law)
- Occupation: Fashion designer
- Years active: 2005–present
- Organization: Jewel by Lisa
- Known for: Founder of Jewel by Lisa; innovation in Ankara textile design
- Notable work: Jewel by Lisa collections
- Title: Creative Director

Lisa Folawiyo is a Nigerian fashion designer.

== Biography ==
Lisa Folawiyo has a background in law, which she studied at the University of Lagos. She is ethnic Yoruba.

She started her fashion label- Jewel by Lisa in 2005 from her home, with an initial investment of 20,000 Naira. She bought 12 yards of fabric and made the first pieces with her mother. This brand has now grown into a household name with reach across multiple continents. What started as Jewel by Lisa is now named Lisa Folawiyo. The brand now has showrooms in Nigeria and in New York. She incorporates traditional West African textiles such as Ankara with modern tailoring techniques and an emphasis on beading and sequin trim. Senegalese-American actress Issa Rae has worn her clothing. In 2012 she was featured in Vogue Italia.

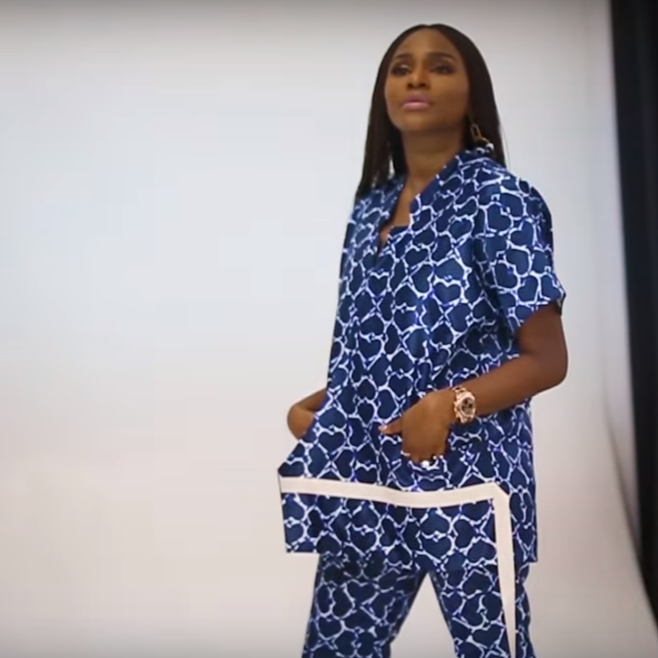
Lisa Folawiyo wearing her own designs

== Prizes ==
- 2012: Africa Fashion Award
- 2014: One of eight emerging talents by WWD Women's Wear Daily
- 2015: Featured in the BOF500

== Personal life ==
Folawiyo had been married for 18 years. She is mother to two children. Her father-in-law was the industrialist Wahab Iyanda Folawiyo.
