= Kenneth Ize =

Nigerian fashion designer

- Born: October 5, 1990 (age 36); Lagos, Nigeria
- Education: University of Applied Arts Vienna
- Known for: Use of traditional West African fabrics and craftsmanship
- Label: Kenneth Ize
- Awards: Finalist, LVMH Prize (2019)

Kenneth Ize (born October 5, 1990) is a Nigerian fashion designer. He is the founder of Kenneth Ize, an eponymous fashion brand, known for its use of traditional West African fabrics and craftsmanship.

== Early life and education ==
Ize was born in Lagos, Nigeria. At the age of four, he moved to Austria with his family. At the University of Applied Arts Vienna, Ize studied fashion and was mentored by designers Bernhard Willhelm and Hussein Chalayan. A New York internship with Edun, the sustainable fashion label co-founded by Bono and Ali Hewson, inspired his decision to start his own label and base it in Nigeria. After graduating in 2013, Ize launched his label at Lagos Fashion Week but took a two-year hiatus to pursue a master's degree before relaunching in 2015.

== Career ==
Ize's work focuses on the use of Aso Oke, a traditional Nigerian fabric woven by local artisans. Ize collaborates with weavers and design groups across Nigeria. Made by the Yoruba, aso oke is traditionally worn on special occasions, and Ize produces it with a community of 10 to 15 weavers at his factory in Ilorin. His designs often feature technicolor suiting and androgynous looks, which he says pay homage to his Pan-African heritage.

In 2019, Ize was a finalist for the LVMH Prize and introduced a womenswear line. He made his Paris Fashion Week debut in February 2020, with models Imaan Hammam and Naomi Campbell participating in the show. In December 2020, he was among 20 honorees at The Fashion Awards, presented by the British Fashion Council, recognized in the community category.

In 2021, he was named a finalist for the International Woolmark Prize. He also collaborated with Maison Karl Lagerfeld. He returned to the Paris runway in September 2021 with his Spring 2022 collection, titled "It's a New Dawn".

In 2022, Ize parted ways with his investor and put the label on hiatus, settling in Lagos; for his Fall 2023 collection, shown in Paris, he assembled garments from upcycled clothing sourced in the city's street markets. An ensemble from his Spring/Summer 2021 collection was acquired by the Victoria and Albert Museum and displayed in its 2022 exhibition Africa Fashion.

== Personal life ==
Ize is openly gay. He has spoken about working as a queer designer in Nigeria, where same-sex relationships are criminalized, and has used his collections to draw attention to LGBTQ+ rights.
