= Copenhagen Fashion Week =

Fashion event in Copenhagen, Denmark

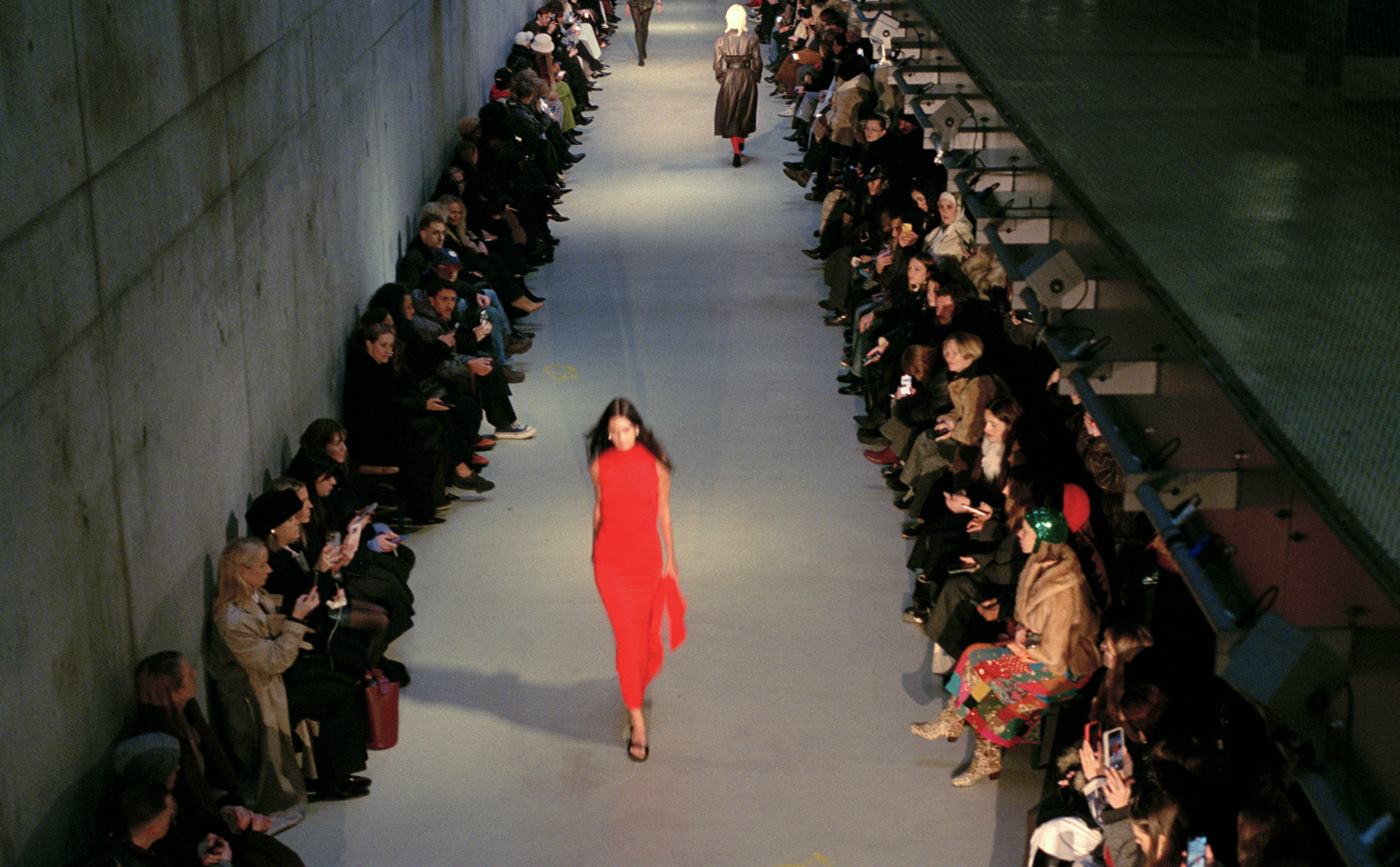
- Genre: Clothing and fashion exhibitions
- Frequency: biannually
- Locations: Copenhagen, Denmark
- Inaugurated: 2006
- Website: https://copenhagenfashionweek.com

Copenhagen Fashion Week is an international fashion event in Copenhagen, Denmark. This biannual event is organized by the Danish Fashion Institute.

== History ==
The first Copenhagen Fashion Week was held in 2006, following the merger of the Danish clothing trade fairs, Dansk Modeuge and Dansk Herremodeuge, which dated back to the 1950s.

== Organization ==
Each season, Copenhagen Fashion Week hosts four days of shows, presentations, and events as well as the two trade shows, CIFF and Revolver.

Copenhagen Fashion Week is a non-profit organization run on 15% public funding and 85% commercial partnerships, with the Danish Ministry of Industry, Business and Financial Affairs being the main contributor.

The applications for the official Fashion Week schedule are assessed by a committee of representatives from the Scandinavian fashion industry, including press, production professionals, and industry organizations. The Copenhagen Fashion Week secretariat does not participate in the assessment.

== Sustainability ==
In 2018, the CEO Cecilie Thorsmark established an advisory board and partner institute, in Futurum, to organize sustainability practices for Copenhagen Fashion Week. In 2023, Copenhagen Fashion Week hosted designers from Europe and the US who followed the organizers' implemented sustainability requirements for participating fashion brands. The sustainability standards necessitate that brands demonstrate that a minimum of 50 percent of their collection is composed of certified, preferred, up-cycled, or recycled materials, along with their commitment to due diligence throughout their supply chain.
