= Gartow-Höhbeck transmitter =

Coordinates: 53°04′04″N 11°26′34″E

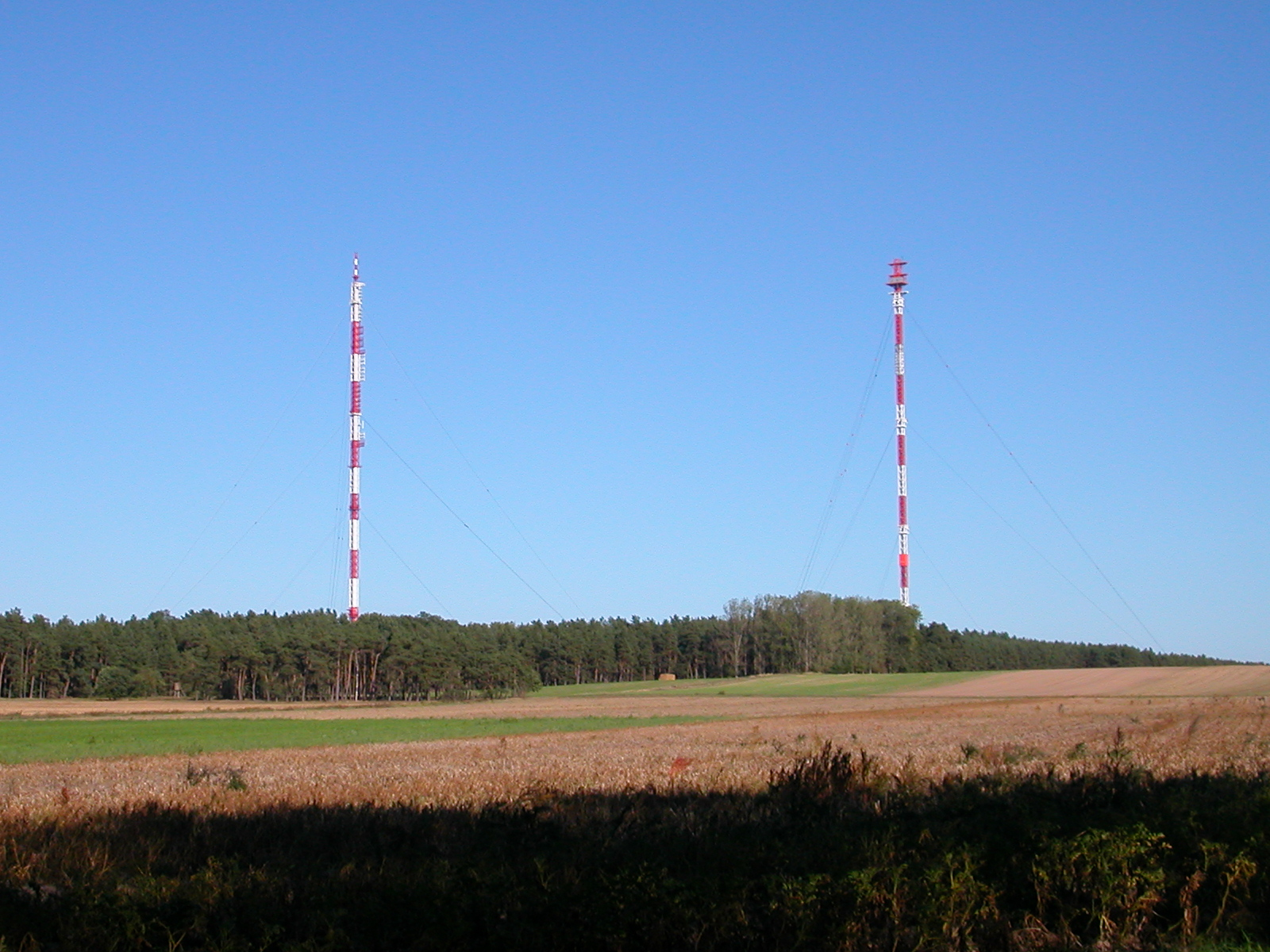
The masts of Gartow transmitter

Gartow-Höhbeck transmitter is a large facility for FM and TV transmission in Lower Saxony, Germany, situated behalf of the communities of Gartow and Höhbeck.

The Gartow-Höhbeck transmitter had, until 2009, two guyed antenna masts, one with a height of 327 metres, the other with a height of 344 metres. This made Gartow-Höhbeck transmitter the only transmission site in Europe with two supertall towers, that were exclusively used for transmissions in the VHF/UHF range.

== History ==
The since-demolished 327-metre mast, which was situated on the area of Höhbeck community, was built in 1963; the remaining 344-metre mast, which is situated on the site of Gartow community, was completed in 1978.

== Radio equipment and usage ==
At time of completion it was, together with the since-demolished mast of the Berlin-Frohnau radio relay station, the tallest structure in former West Germany, and served together with the 327-metre mast for a directional radio link to West Berlin. The terminal in Berlin for the link starting from the 327-metre tower was the Berlin Telecommunication Tower, and for the link starting from the 344-metre tower, the terminal was the Berlin-Frohnau radio relay station. For these links, both masts were equipped with directional radio antennas; on the smaller mast, dipole antennas with reflectors were installed, while on the larger mast, conventional antennas for directional radio links mounted on platforms were used. Because structures used for carrying directional radio links have to withstand great wind forces, as such antennas cause high wind loads, both masts are of a very strong design and anchored by double guys. The larger mast, which is today used mainly for FM-broadcasting, meteorological measurements and carbon dioxide monitoring, is equipped with several closed cabinets for technical equipment. The topmost of these cabinets is situated at 325 metres, making it the highest closed room on a man-made structure in the European Union. The smaller mast also carried a small cabinet on its lower section.

By using the large masts of the Gartow-Höbeck transmitter and the Berlin-Frohnau radio relay station, the first direct directional radio link between former West Germany and Berlin could be realized. This link was in service until German reunification in 1990.

Beside these two masts, there is also a free-standing directional radio tower much lower than the masts, which carried until 1990 huge disk antennas for the scattered directional radio link to former West Berlin.

== Obsolete mast ==
After 1990, the 327-metre tall mast became increasingly obsolete, and was made completely redundant by the digital switchover of TV broadcasting in 2008. As there was no requirement to keep two supertall masts at the site, it was demolished with explosives on August 20, 2009.

Gartow-Höhbeck transmitter

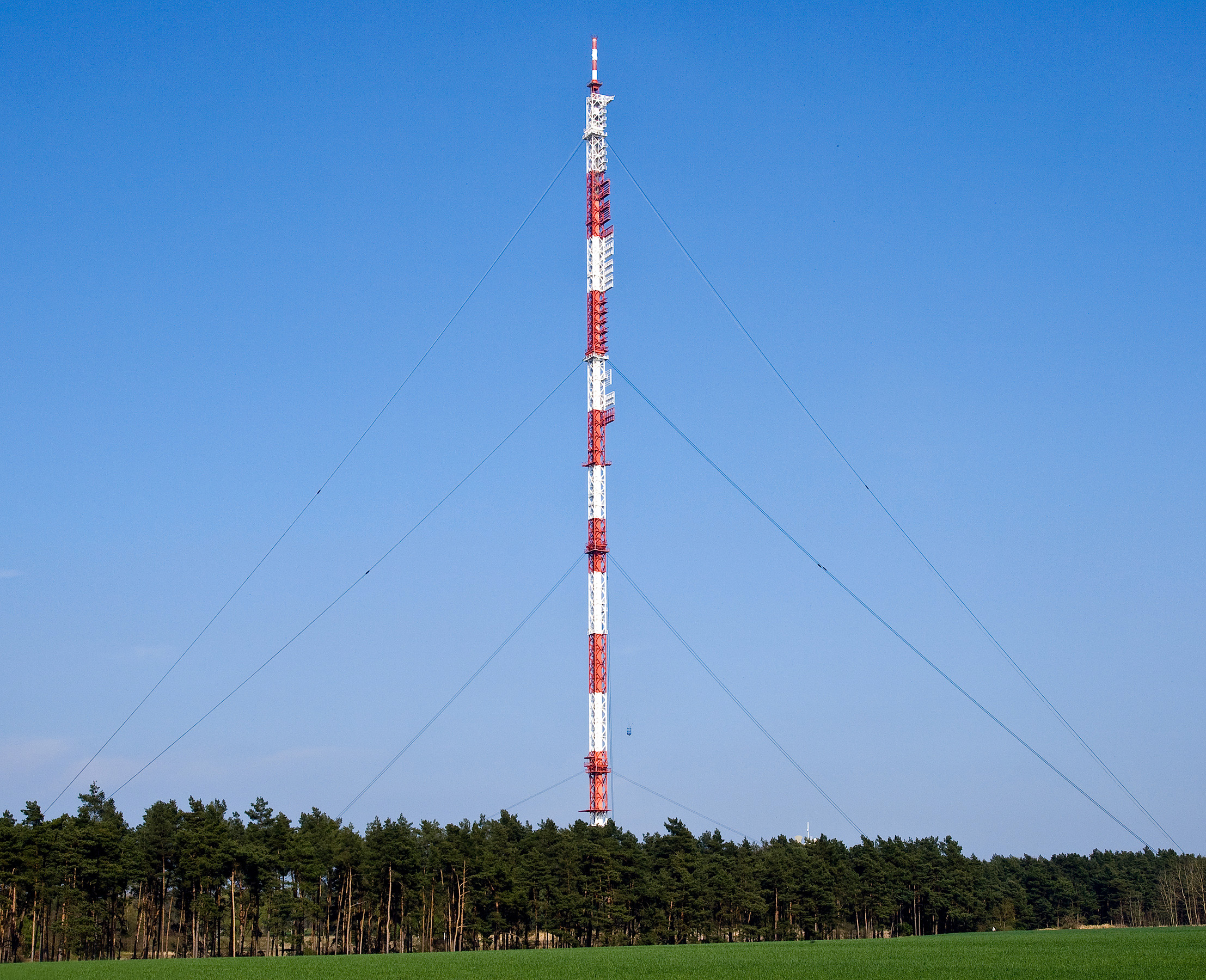
Gartow Transmission Tower 1

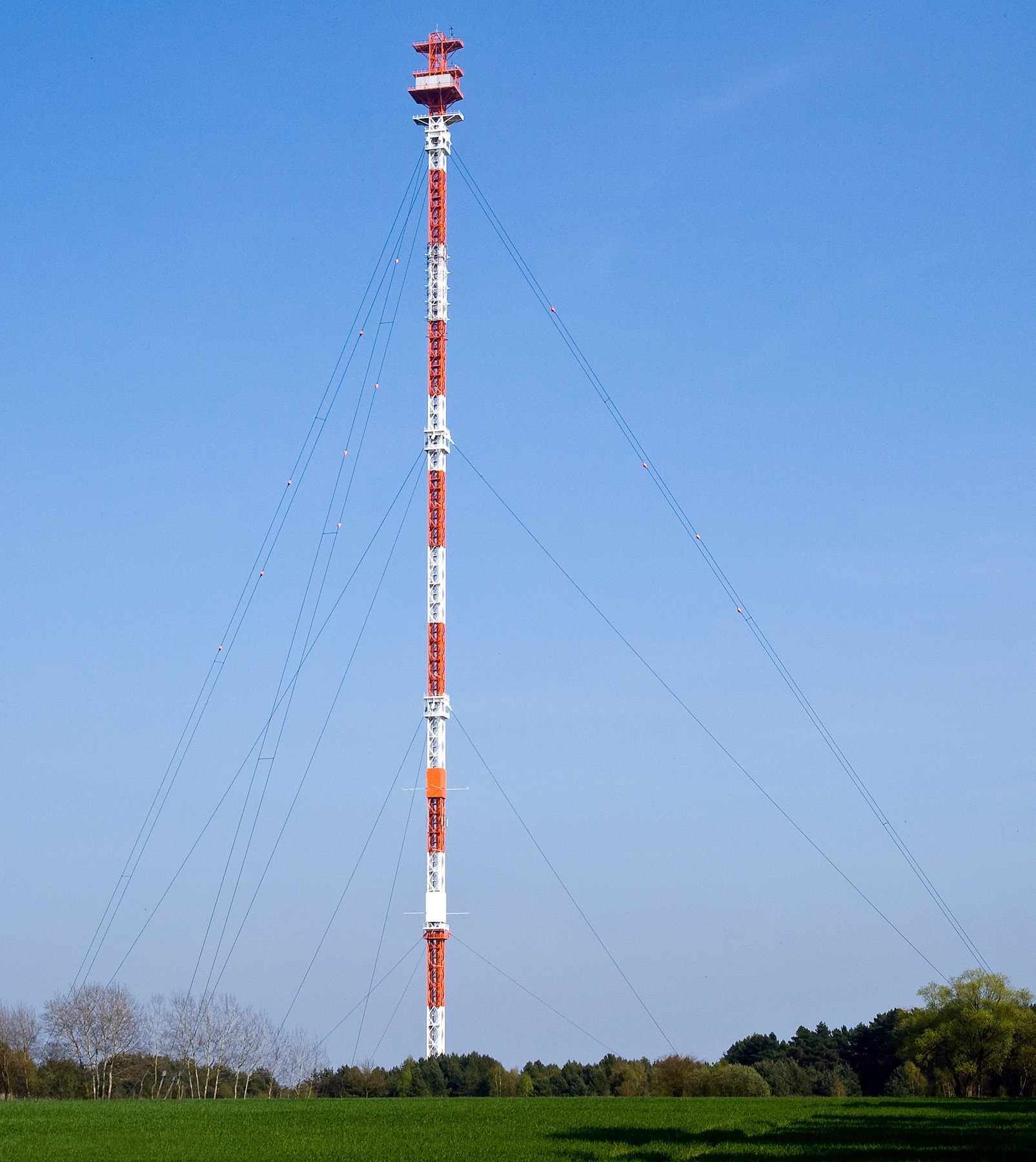
Gartow Transmission Tower 2

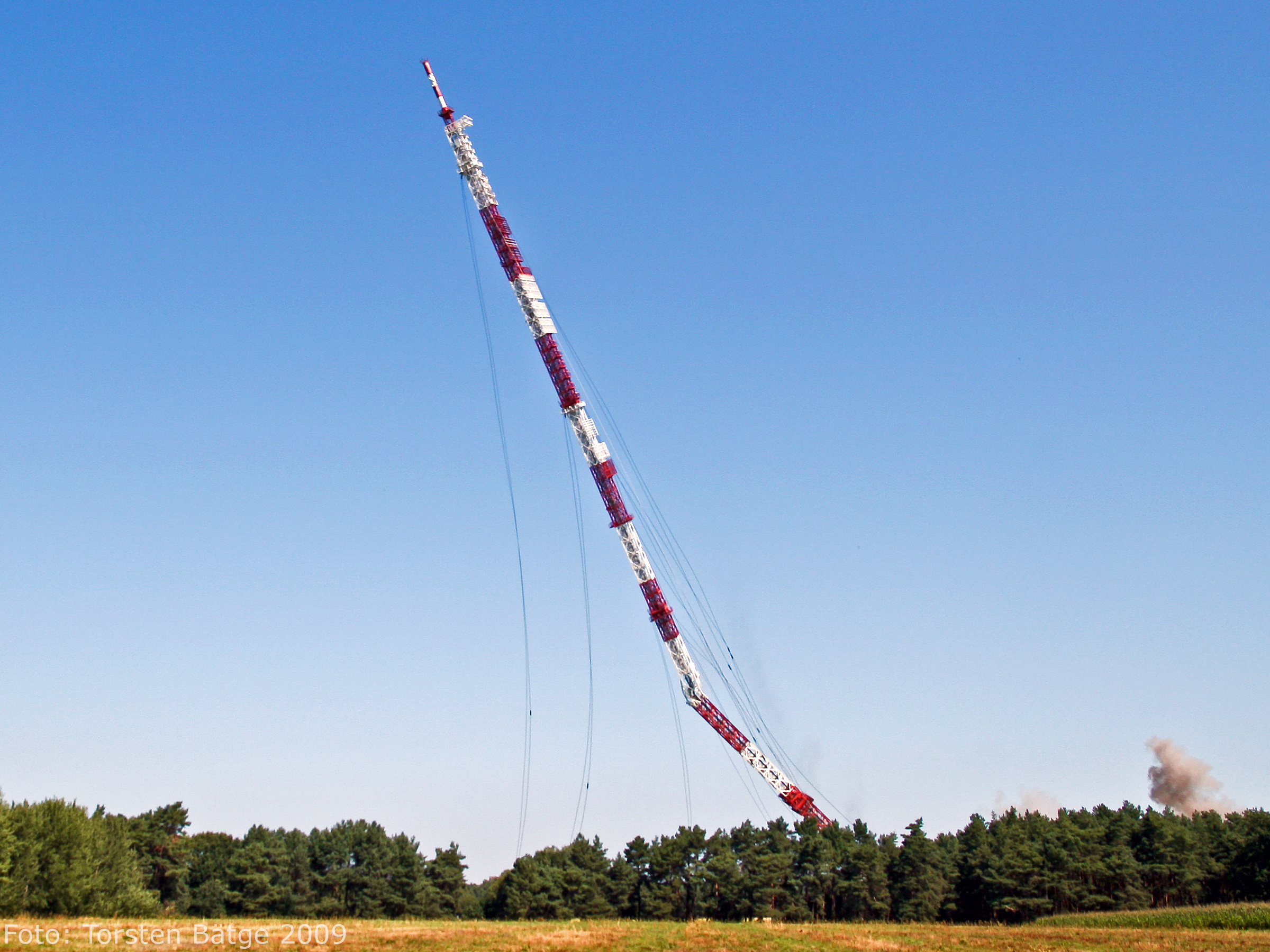
Blasting of Gartow 1 on 20 August 2009

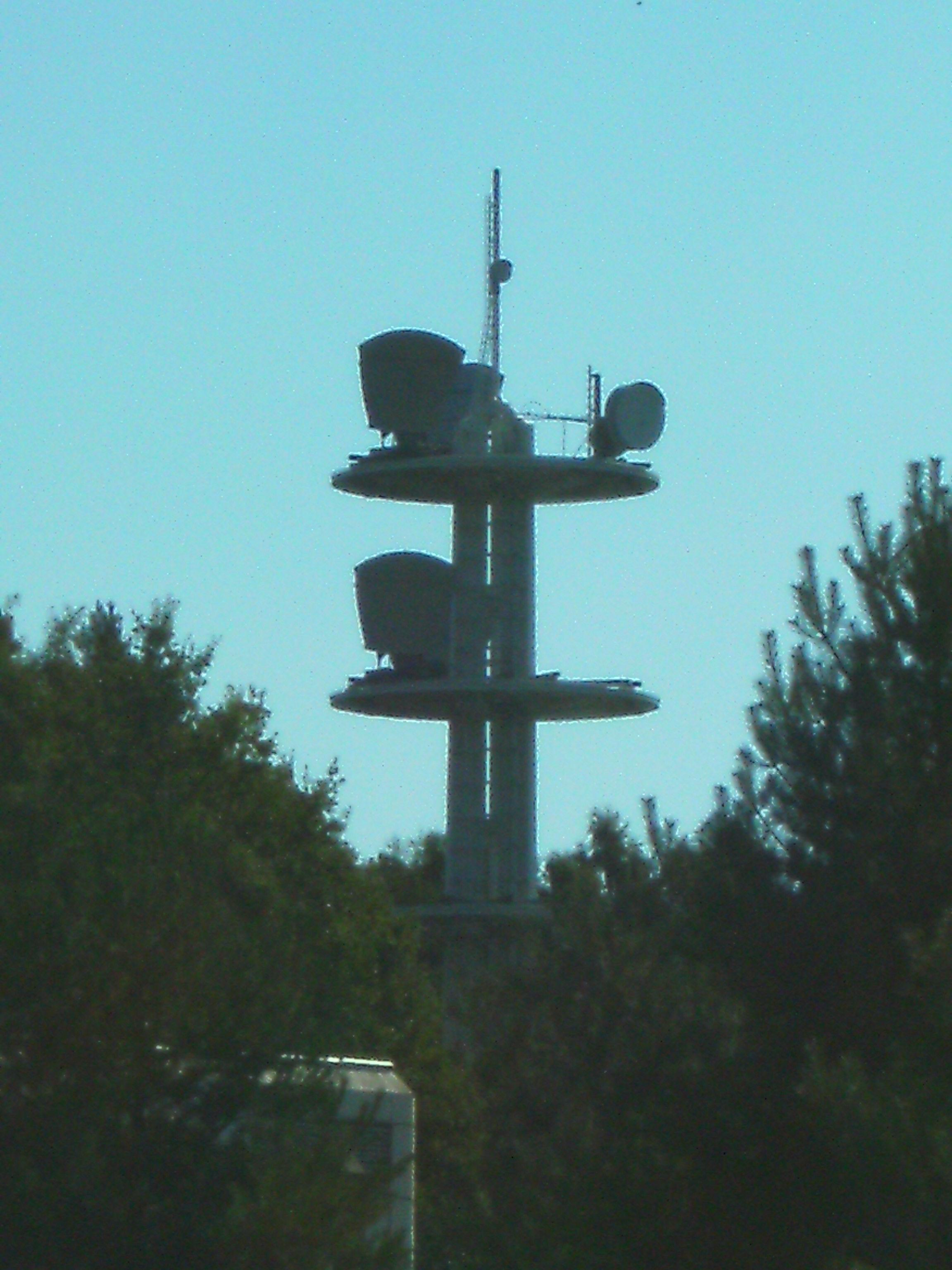
Directional radio tower

== See also ==
- List of masts
