= Gollanczstraße =

Street in Frohnau, Berlin

- Gollanczstrasse
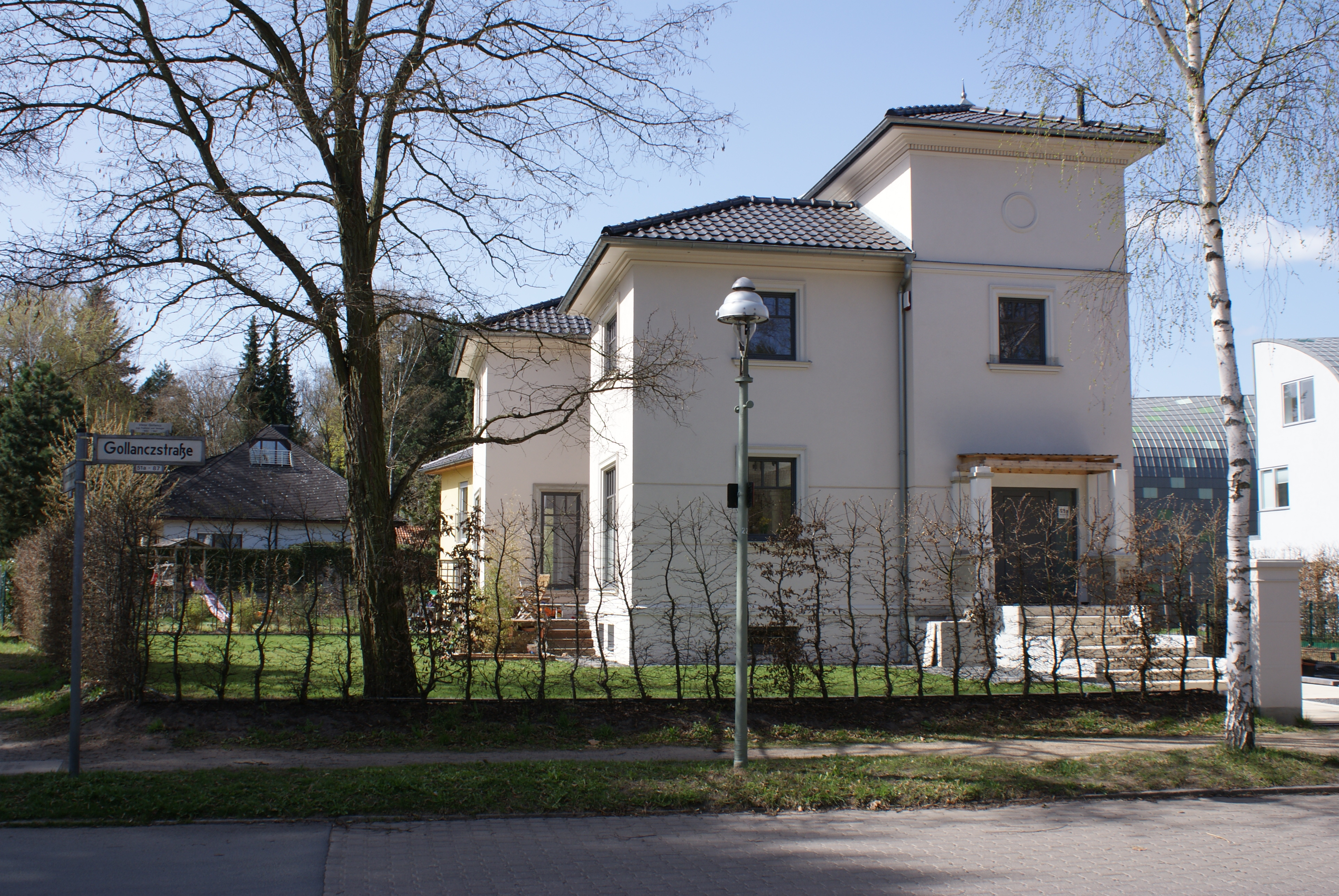
- Gollanczstraße
- Interactive map of Gollanczstraße
- Former names: Speestraße; (before 1925–1935); Lodystraße; (1935–1945); Edith-Cavell-Straße; (1945–1955)
- Namesake: Sir Victor Gollancz
- Type: Street
- Location: Berlin, Germany
- Quarter: Frohnau
- Nearest metro station: Frohnau
- Coordinates: 52°38′32″N 13°17′12″E
- Southeast end: Ariadnestraße
- Major junctions: Markgrafenstraße; Schönfließerstraße; Barthstraße; Rappenweg; Criolloweg; Am Poloplatz; Lipizzanerweg; Mustangweg; Ponyweg
- Northwest end: Brandenburg border

Gollanczstraße, or Gollanczstrasse (see ß), is a street in the Frohnau area in the northwestern part of Berlin. It is characterized by several large patrician villas from the 1920s, and several of the villas on the street are listed as cultural heritage sites by the state authorities. During the Cold War, the street was located within West Berlin, a few hundred meters from the Berlin Wall. The street is named for the British publisher and humanitarian, Sir Victor Gollancz.

The street is found in an area with many parks and green spaces, and is located in one of the most affluent parts of Berlin. The Ludwig Lesser Park is found to the east of the street, and the Poloplatz to the north.

The Victor Gollancz Elementary School is located in Gollanczstraße 18–24 and likewise named for Victor Gollancz.

== Name ==
The street was formerly known as Speestraße (from before 1922 until 1935) in honour of Admiral Maximilian von Spee and as Lodystraße (from 1935 until 1955) in honour of the World War I era spy Carl Hans Lody. On 28 September 1955, the street was renamed Gollanczstraße by West Berlin authorities in honour of Sir Victor Gollancz, a British publisher noted for his postwar humanitarian work for German civilians and for his promotion of friendship and reconciliation based on his internationalism and his ethic of brotherly love. The Gollancz family ultimately took its name from the Polish/German town Gołańcz.

== Cultural heritage sites ==
The following properties are listed as cultural heritage sites:

- Gollanczstraße 3/5, double villa built 1929–30 and designed by Erich Taenzer
- Gollanczstraße 7, villa built 1929–30 and designed by Erich Taenzer
- Gollanczstraße 9, villa built 1929–30 and designed by Erich Taenzer
- Gollanczstraße 11, villa built 1928–29 and designed by Erich Taenzer
- Gollanczstraße 18/24, school built 1928–29 and designed by Fritz Beyer, now known as the Victor Gollancz Elementary School
- Gollanczstraße 32/38, garden landscaped 1937–38 by Hermann Mattern

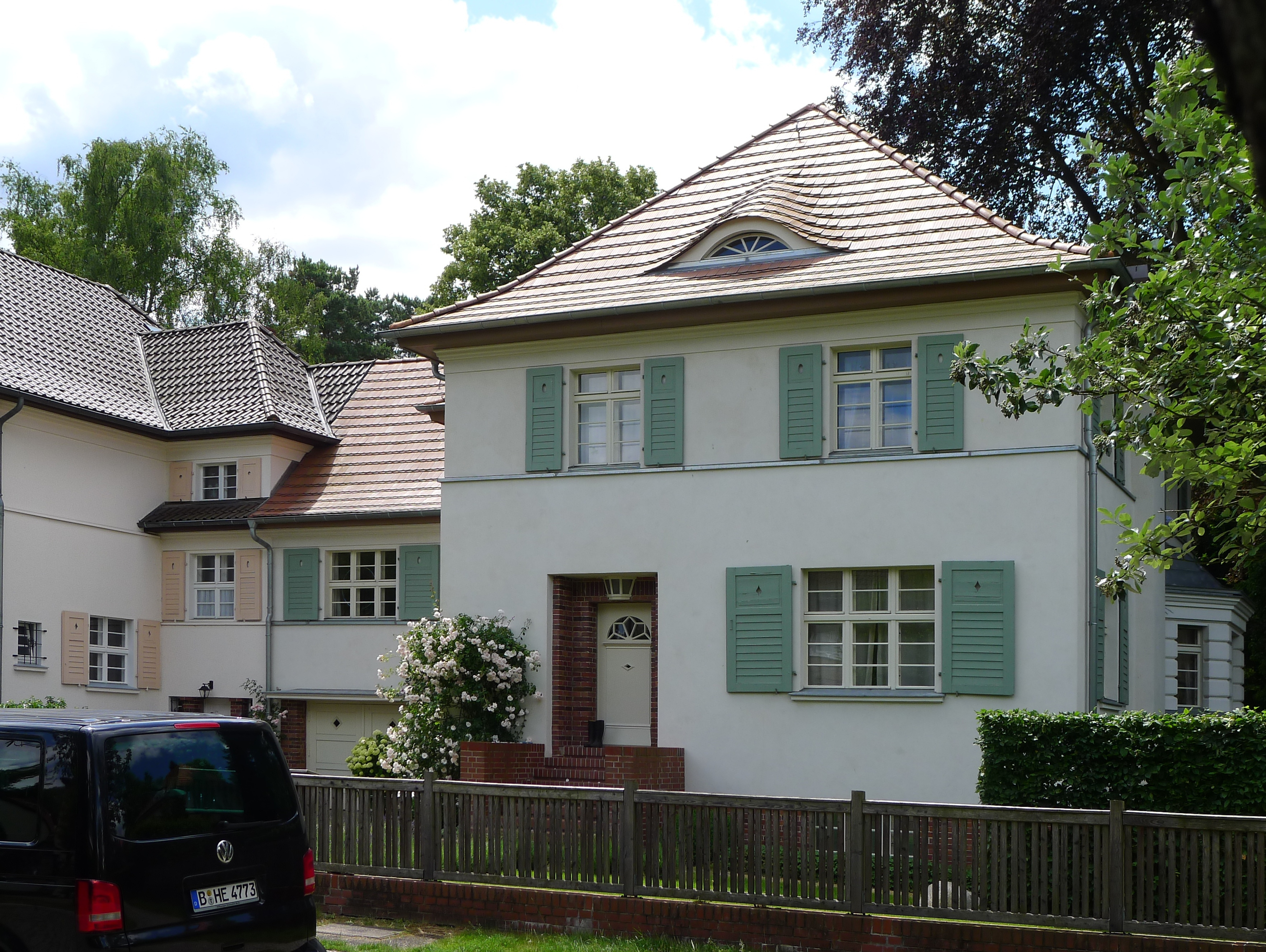
Gollanczstraße 3/5

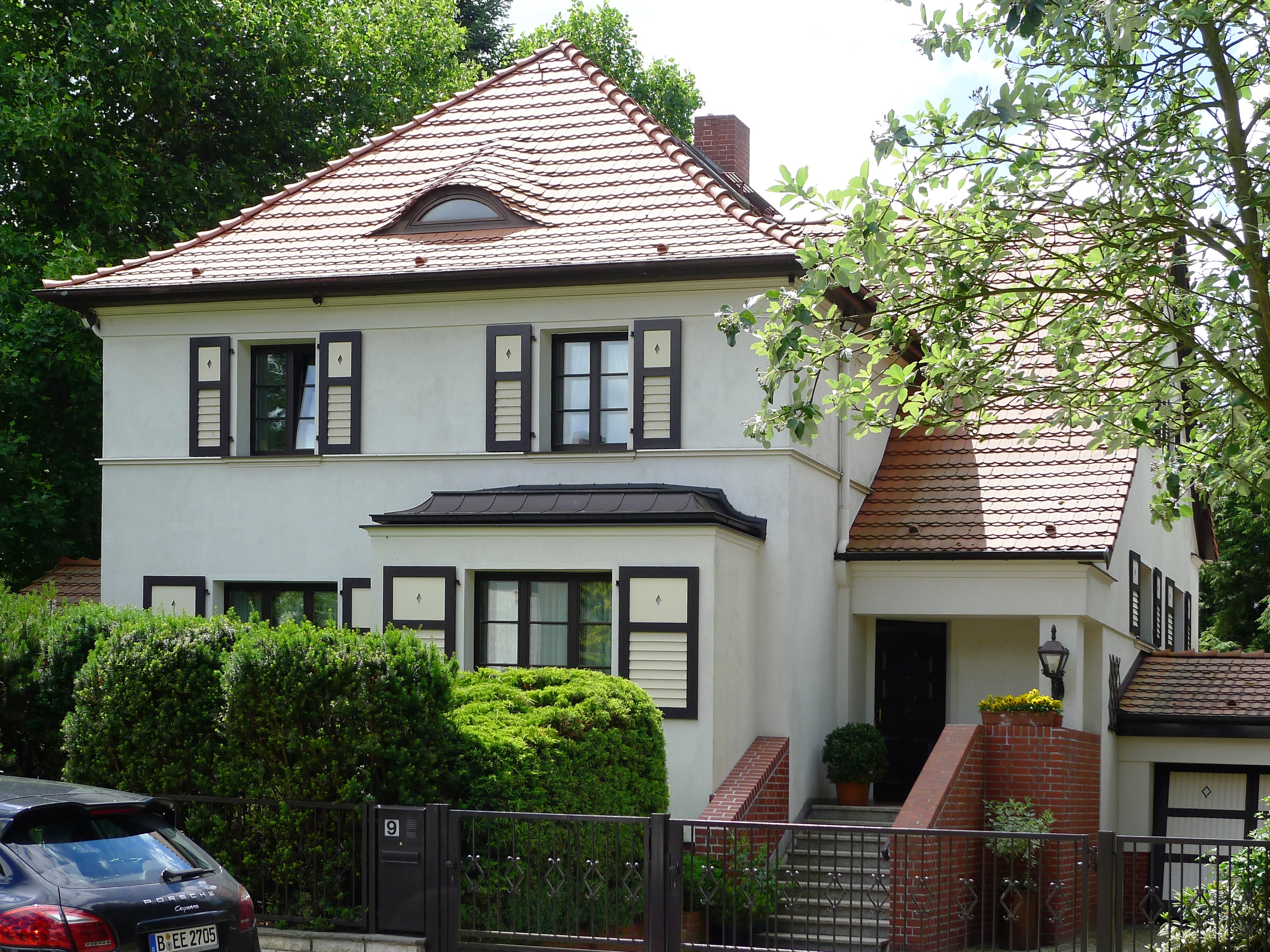
Gollanczstraße 9

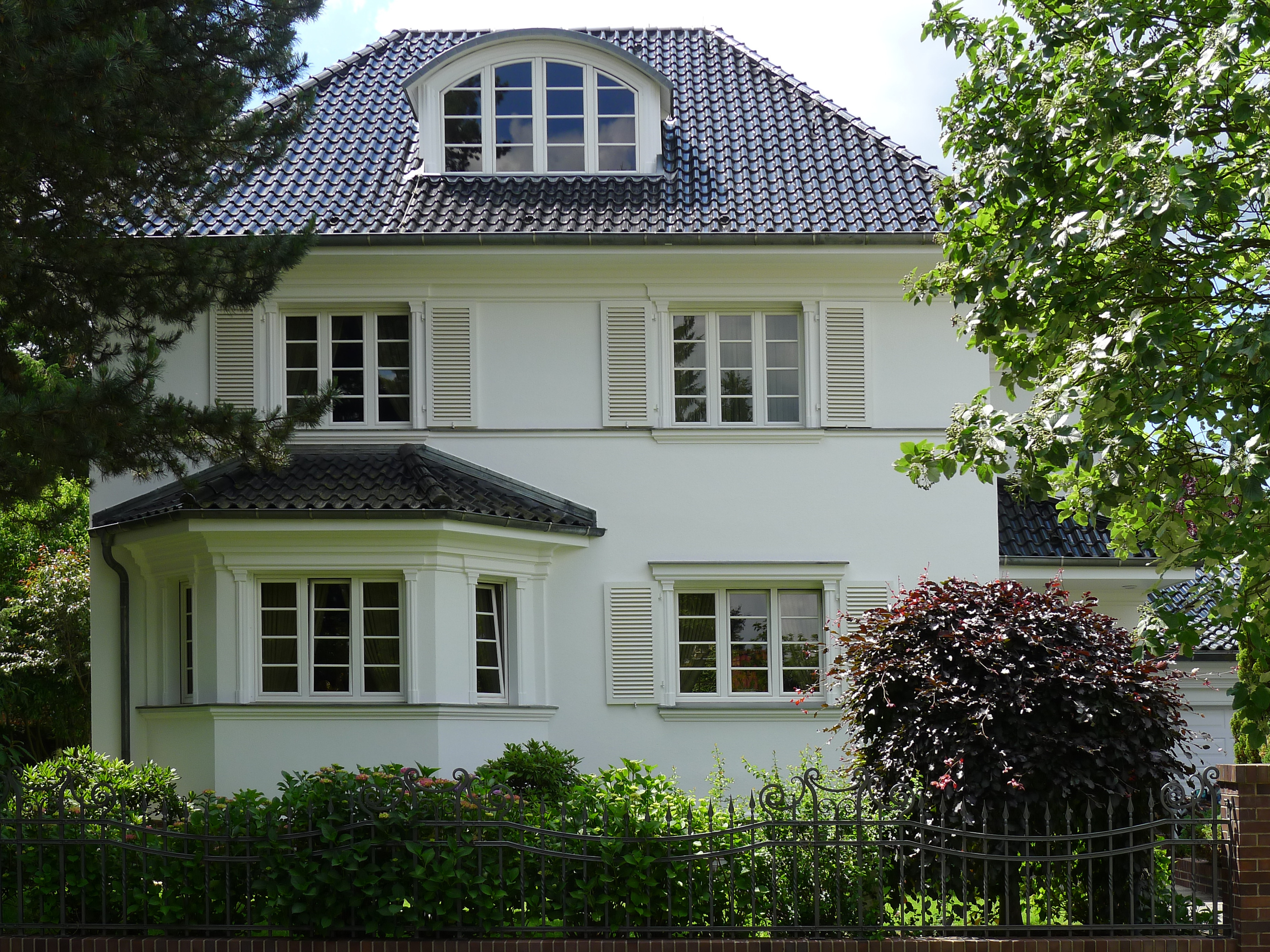
Gollanczstraße 11
