= Ludwig Lesser Park =

Park in North Western Berlin, Germany

Coordinates: 52°38′23″N 13°17′21″E

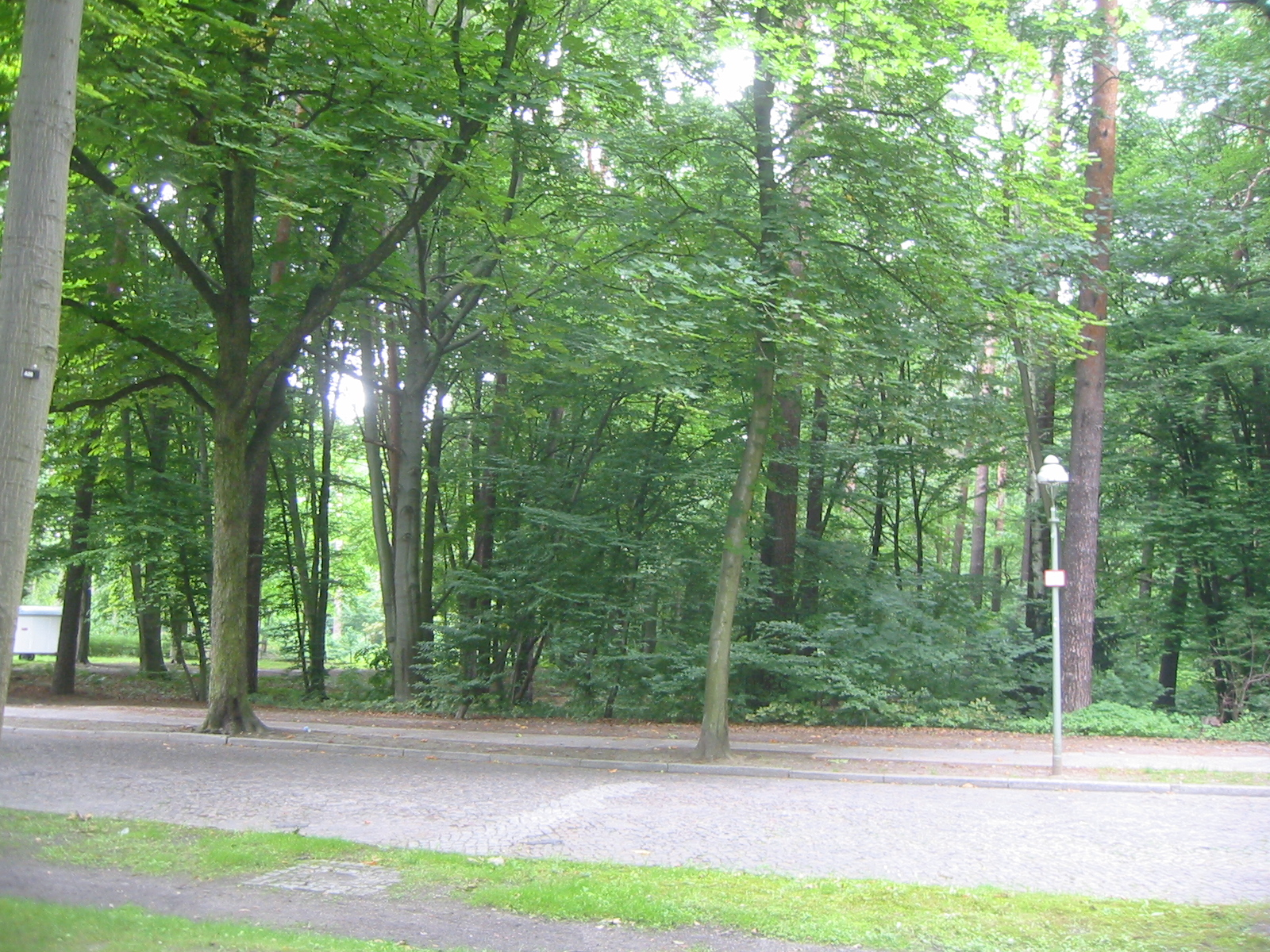
Ludwig Lesser Park

The Ludwig Lesser Park (German: Ludwig-Lesser-Park) is a park in the Frohnau area in the northwestern part of Berlin. It is located between Schönfließer Straße to the north, Gollanczstraße to the west, Senheimer Straße to the east and Markgrafenstraße to the south. It is named for the landscape architect Ludwig Lesser, and was constructed around 1908.
