= Schnackenburg =

- Town
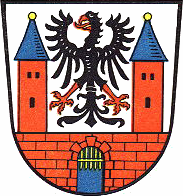
- Coat of arms

- Location of Schnackenburg within Lüchow-Dannenberg district
- Interactive map of Schnackenburg
- Location within Germany Location within Lower Saxony
- Coordinates: 53°02′12″N 11°34′05″E
- Country: Germany
- State: Lower Saxony
- District: Lüchow-Dannenberg
- Municipal assoc.: Gartow
- Subdivisions: 4 Ortsteile

Government
  - Mayor: Andreas Koch

Area
  - Total: 23.76 km^{2} (9.17 sq mi)
- Elevation: 17 m (56 ft)

Population (2025-12-31)
  - Total: 451
  - Density: 19.0/km^{2} (49.2/sq mi)
- Time zone: UTC+01:00 (CET)
  - Summer (DST): UTC+02:00 (CEST)
- Postal codes: 29493
- Dialling codes: 05840
- Vehicle registration: DAN
- Website: www.gartow.de

Schnackenburg (German pronunciation: [ˈʃnakn̩bʊʁk]) is a town in the Lüchow-Dannenberg district, in Lower Saxony, Germany. It is situated on the left bank of the Elbe. It is part of the Samtgemeinde ("collective municipality") Gartow. Lying at the easternmost projection of Lower Saxony, the town is bordered on all sides except the west by territory that was formerly East Germany. It is the least densely populated town ("Stadt") in what was West Germany, although there are nine towns in what was formerly East Germany that are less densely populated (mostly in Brandenburg).

== Etymology of the toponym ==
The Polabian name of Schnackenburg is Godĕgord (also spelled Godegür in older German reference material), probably from god (< Slavic *gadă) ‘snake’ and gord (< Slavic *gordă) ‘fortress’, ‘town’. The German name Schnackenburg appears to be derived from Low Saxon Snaak or Snack ‘snake’ (plural Snaken or Snacken) and Borg ‘fortress’, ‘town’.

== History ==
Between 1945 and 1990 Schnackenburg served as West German inner German border crossing for inland navigation on the Elbe. The crossing was open for freight vessels navigating between Czechoslovakia, the Soviet Zone of occupation in Germany (till 1949, thereafter the East German Democratic Republic), or West Berlin and the British zone of occupation (till 1949) and thereafter the West German Federal Republic of Germany. The traffic was subject to the Interzonal traffic regulations, that between West Germany and West Berlin followed the special regulations of the Transit Agreement (1972).
