= Hermsdorf (Berlin) =

- Quarter of Berlin
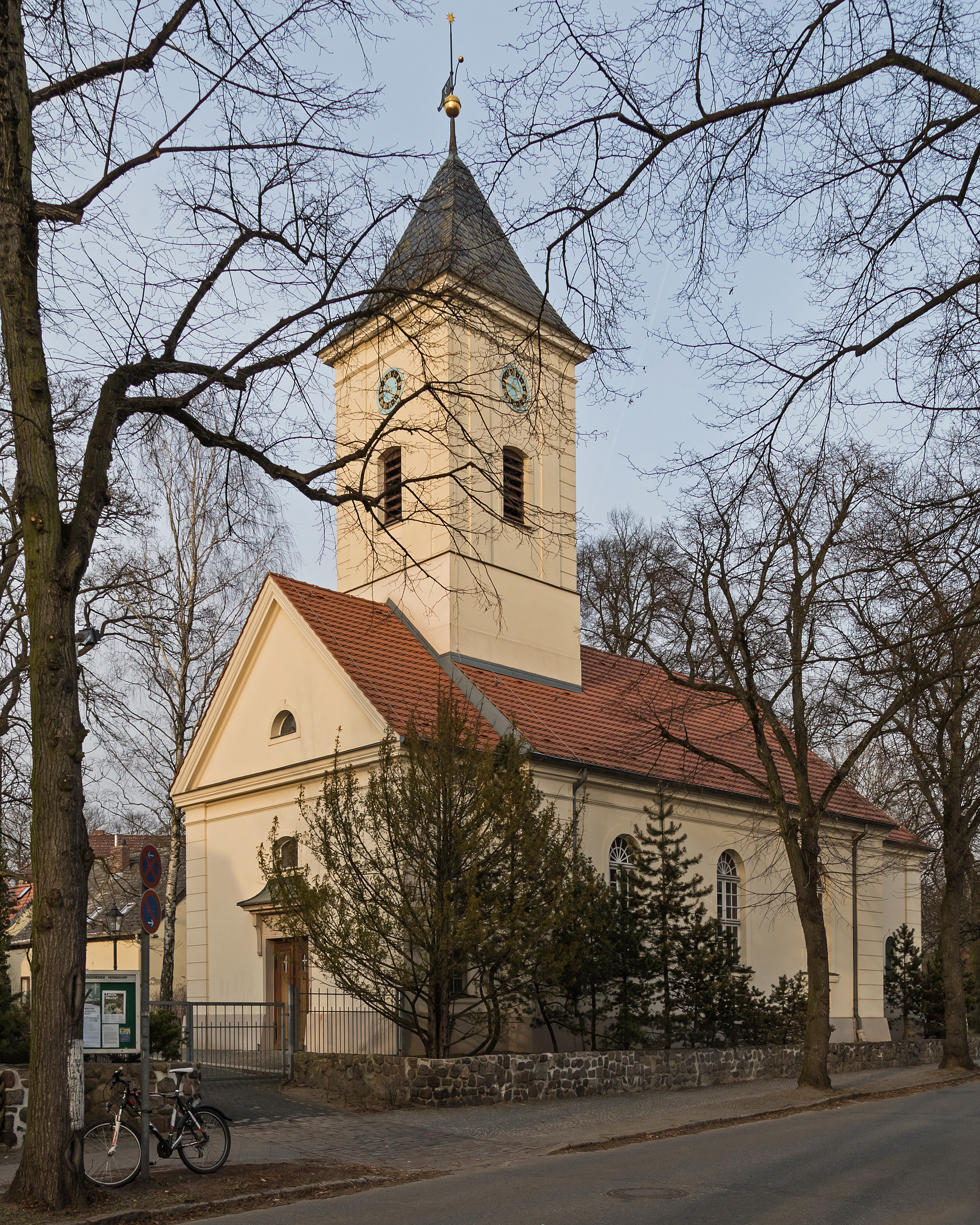
- Village church

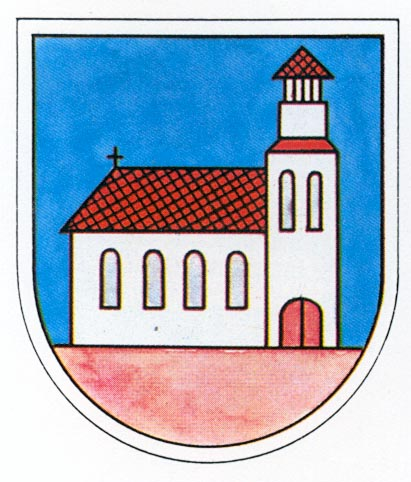
- Coat of arms

- Location of Hermsdorf in Reinickendorf district and Berlin
- Interactive map of Hermsdorf
- Location within Germany Location within Berlin
- Coordinates: 52°37′00″N 13°19′00″E
- Country: Germany
- State: Berlin
- City: Berlin
- Borough: Reinickendorf
- Founded: 1200

Area
  - Total: 6.1 km^{2} (2.4 sq mi)
- Elevation: 30–65 m (98–213 ft)

Population (2024-12-31)
  - Total: 16,607
  - Density: 2,700/km^{2} (7,100/sq mi)
- Time zone: UTC+01:00 (CET)
  - Summer (DST): UTC+02:00 (CEST)
- Postal codes: 13467
- Vehicle registration: B

Hermsdorf (German pronunciation: [ˈhɛʁmsˌdɔʁf]) is a district (Ortsteil) of Berlin located in the borough (Bezirk) of Reinickendorf.

== History ==
First mentioned in 1200, it was an autonomous municipality merged into Berlin in 1920 with the "Greater Berlin Act". During the Cold War, as part of West Berlin bordering East Germany, it was crossed by the Berlin Wall from 1961 to 1989 at its border with the municipality of Glienicke/Nordbahn.

== Geography ==
It is situated in the north of the city, bordering the Brandenburger municipality of Glienicke/Nordbahn (Oberhavel district). It borders the Berliner localities of Frohnau, Tegel, Waidmannslust and Lübars. It also borders the forest of Tegel and part of its territory is included in Barnim Nature Park.

== Transport ==
Hermsdorf is served by the Berlin S-Bahn line S1 at the station Berlin-Hermsdorf.

== Personalities ==
- Max Beckmann
- Hans Blüher
- Erich Kästner
- Gustav Landauer
- Annemarie Wolff-Richter
- Teomponk Simorangkir

== Literature ==
- Hans J Arnold: "Als in Hermsdorf noch die Semnonen wohnten". ISBN 3-927611-18-2
- "Festschrift 650 Jahre Hermsdorf. 1349–1999". ISBN 3-927611-12-3
- "Ich denke oft an Onkel Franz. Jüdische Spurensuche in Berlin-Reinickendorf". Bd. 2.: Hermsdorf und Umgebung. ISBN 3-923809-82-4
