= Glienicke/Nordbahn =

- Municipality
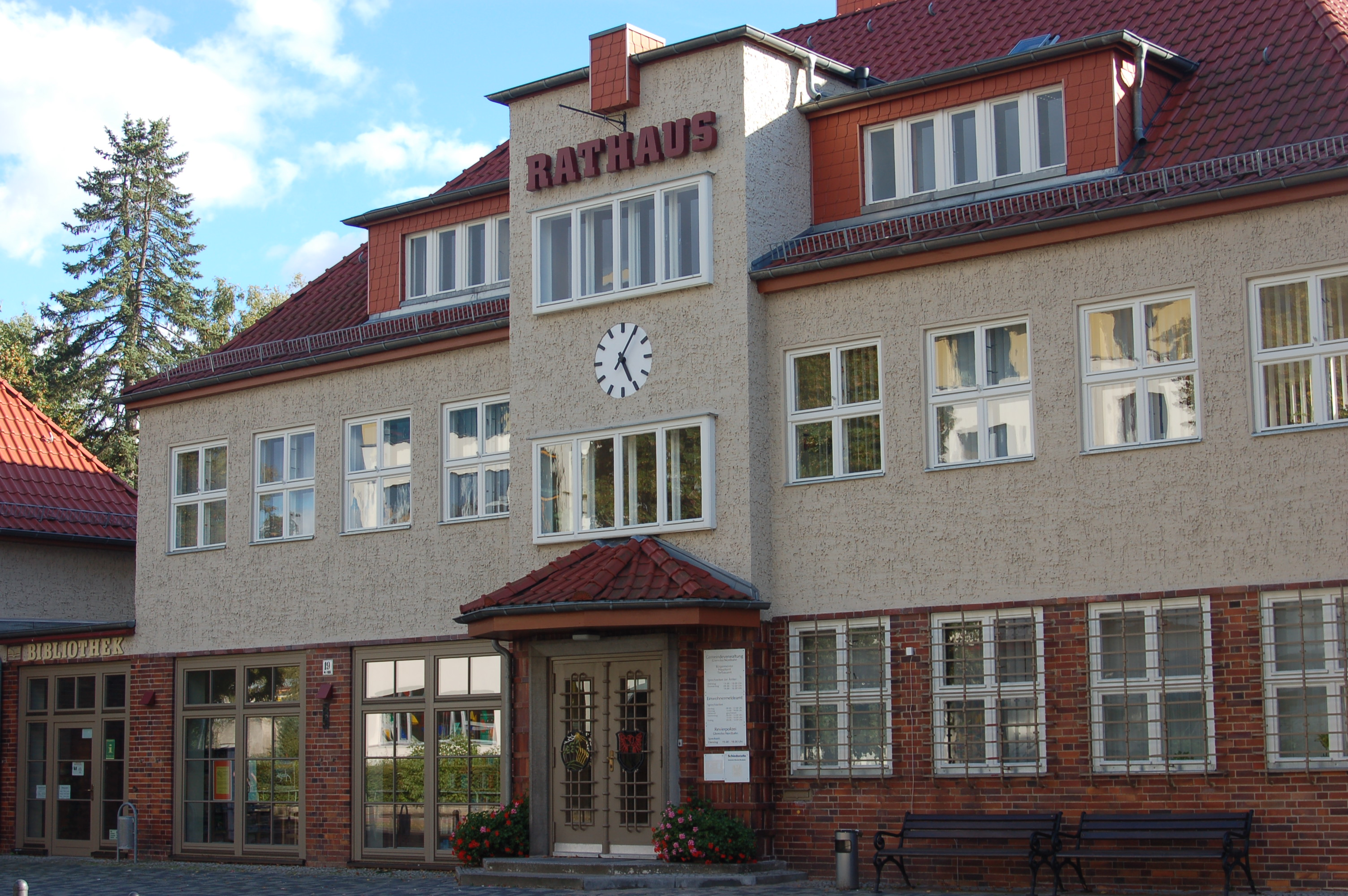
- Town Hall

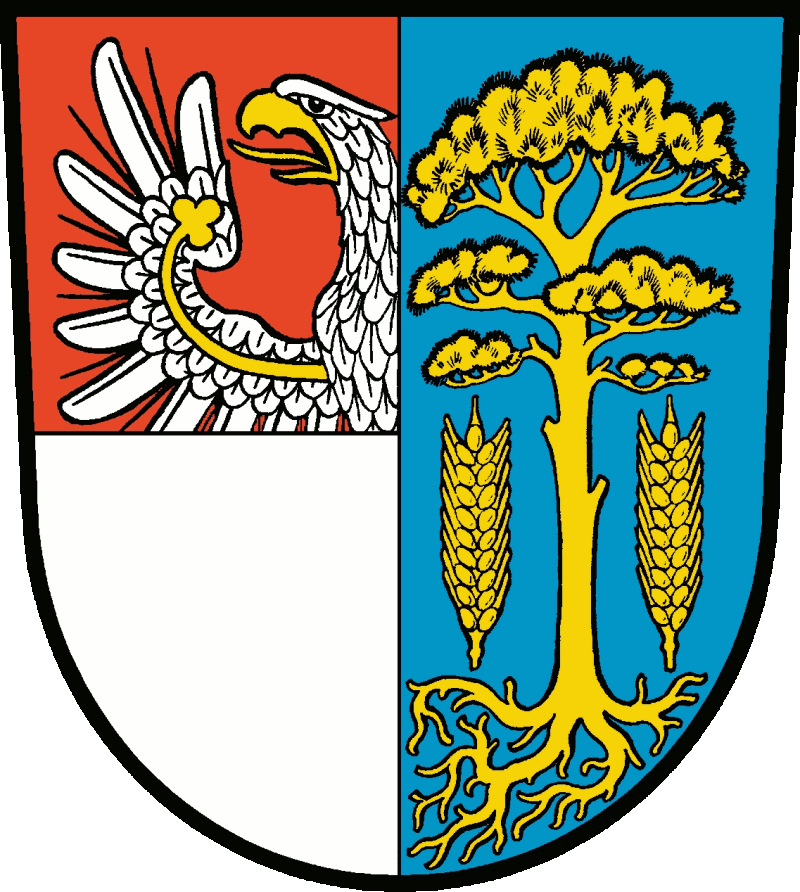
- Coat of arms

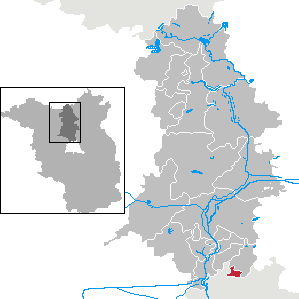
- Location of Glienicke/Nordbahn within Oberhavel district
- Interactive map of Glienicke/Nordbahn
- Location within Germany Location within Brandenburg
- Coordinates: 52°38′N 13°20′E
- Country: Germany
- State: Brandenburg
- District: Oberhavel

Government
  - Mayor (2026–34): Arno Steguweit

Area
  - Total: 4.61 km^{2} (1.78 sq mi)
- Elevation: 47 m (154 ft)

Population (2025-12-31)
  - Total: 12,161
  - Density: 2,640/km^{2} (6,830/sq mi)
- Time zone: UTC+01:00 (CET)
  - Summer (DST): UTC+02:00 (CEST)
- Postal codes: 16548
- Dialling codes: 033056
- Vehicle registration: OHV
- Website: www.glienicke.eu

Glienicke/Nordbahn (German pronunciation: [ˈɡliːnɪkə]) is a municipality in the Oberhavel district, in Brandenburg, Germany. It is located right north of Berlin.

== Situation ==
Glienicke/Nordbahn is located on the northern outskirts of Berlin. The addition of "Nordbahn" (Northern Railway) refers to the proximity to the 19th century-built railway line Berlin-Stralsund, the Prussian Northern Railway. The town is bordered to the south and west by the district Reinickendorf of Berlin (localities Frohnau, Hermsdorf (Berlin) and Lübars) and Schönfließ, Mühlenbecker Land. Between 1961 and 1990 was situated at the eastern border of the Berlin Wall. The village is a typical Angerdorf (meadow) of the Mark Brandenburg. The highest point of the village is the "Langeberg" with 55 m.ü.NN.

From Glienicke there are 16 kilometres (10 miles) to Oranienburg, 40 km (25 mi) to Potsdam, 290 km (180 mi) to Stralsund near the Baltic See, 290 km (180 mi) to Hamburg and 140 km (90 mi) to Cottbus.

== History ==
- First mentioned as Glyneck in 1412.
- Devastated during the War of Thirty Years.
- Reestablished from 1670.
- During the Cold War, Glienicke shared its borders with the former West Berlin, and so between 1961 and 1990 it was separated from it by the Berlin Wall.
- After the reunification of Germany, Glienicke developed as a preferred suburb of Berlin.

== Demography ==
After (East) Berlin, Glienicke/Nordbahn is the most densely populated municipality of any type in what was formerly East Germany, ahead of third-place Eichwalde (both are classified as rural municipalities, or Gemeinden), and well ahead of larger municipalities with city ("Stadt") status, such as Leipzig, Halle, and Dresden.

Development of Population since 1875 within the Current Boundaries (Blue Line: Population; Dotted Line: Comparison to Population Development of Brandenburg state; Grey background: Time of Nazi rule; Red background: Time of communist rule)

Recent Population Development and Projections (Population Development before Census 2011 (blue line); Recent Population Development according to the Census in Germany in 2011 (blue bordered line); Official projections for 2005-2030 (yellow line); for 2020-2030 (green line); for 2017-2030 (scarlet line)

Glienicke/Nordbahn: Population development
within the current boundaries

Year	Pop.	±% p.a.
1875	201	—
1890	251	+1.49%
1910	912	+6.66%
1925	1,823	+4.73%
1933	3,713	+9.30%
1939	5,187	+5.73%
1946	5,232	+0.12%
1950	5,392	+0.76%
1964	4,997	−0.54%
1971	4,930	−0.19%
1981	4,774	−0.32%
1985	4,768	−0.03%
1989	4,483	−1.53%
1990	4,407	−1.70%
1991	4,370	−0.84%
1992	4,327	−0.98%
1993	4,365	+0.88%

Year	Pop.	±% p.a.
1994	4,515	+3.44%
1995	4,641	+2.79%
1996	4,965	+6.98%
1997	5,338	+7.51%
1998	5,943	+11.33%
1999	6,947	+16.89%
2000	7,709	+10.97%
2001	8,324	+7.98%
2002	8,714	+4.69%
2003	8,929	+2.47%
2004	9,140	+2.36%
2005	9,597	+5.00%
2006	9,879	+2.94%
2007	10,270	+3.96%
2008	10,461	+1.86%
2009	10,774	+2.99%
2010	11,005	+2.14%

Year	Pop.	±% p.a.
2011	11,085	+0.73%
2012	11,357	+2.45%
2013	11,667	+2.73%
2014	11,942	+2.36%
2015	12,155	+1.78%
2016	12,159	+0.03%
2017	12,227	+0.56%
2018	12,218	−0.07%
2019	12,358	+1.15%
2020	12,430	+0.58%
2021	12,403	−0.22%
2022	12,190	−1.72%
2023	12,039	−1.24%
2024	12,159	+1.00%
2025	12,161	+0.02%

== Pictures ==
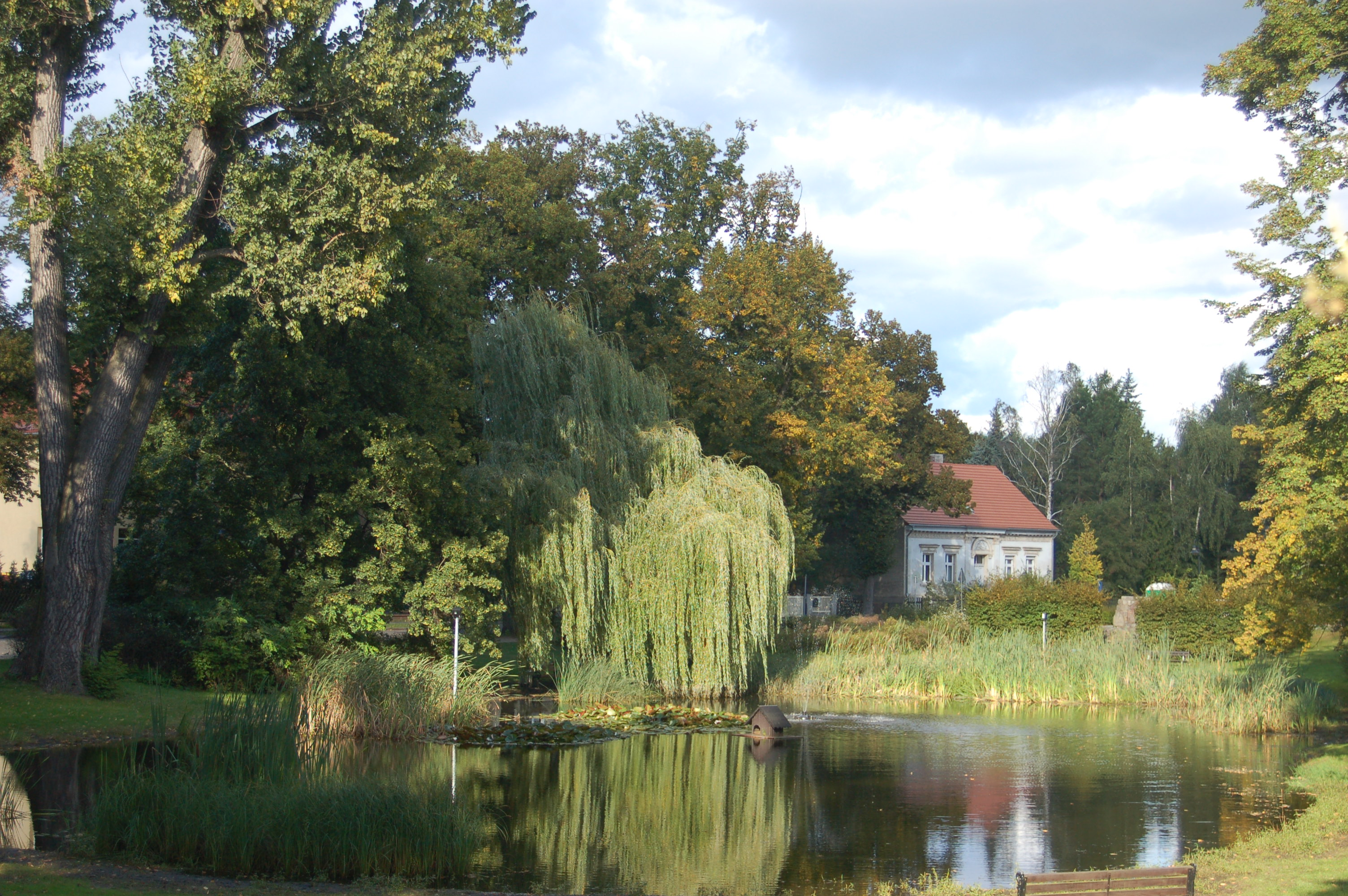
Central Pond.

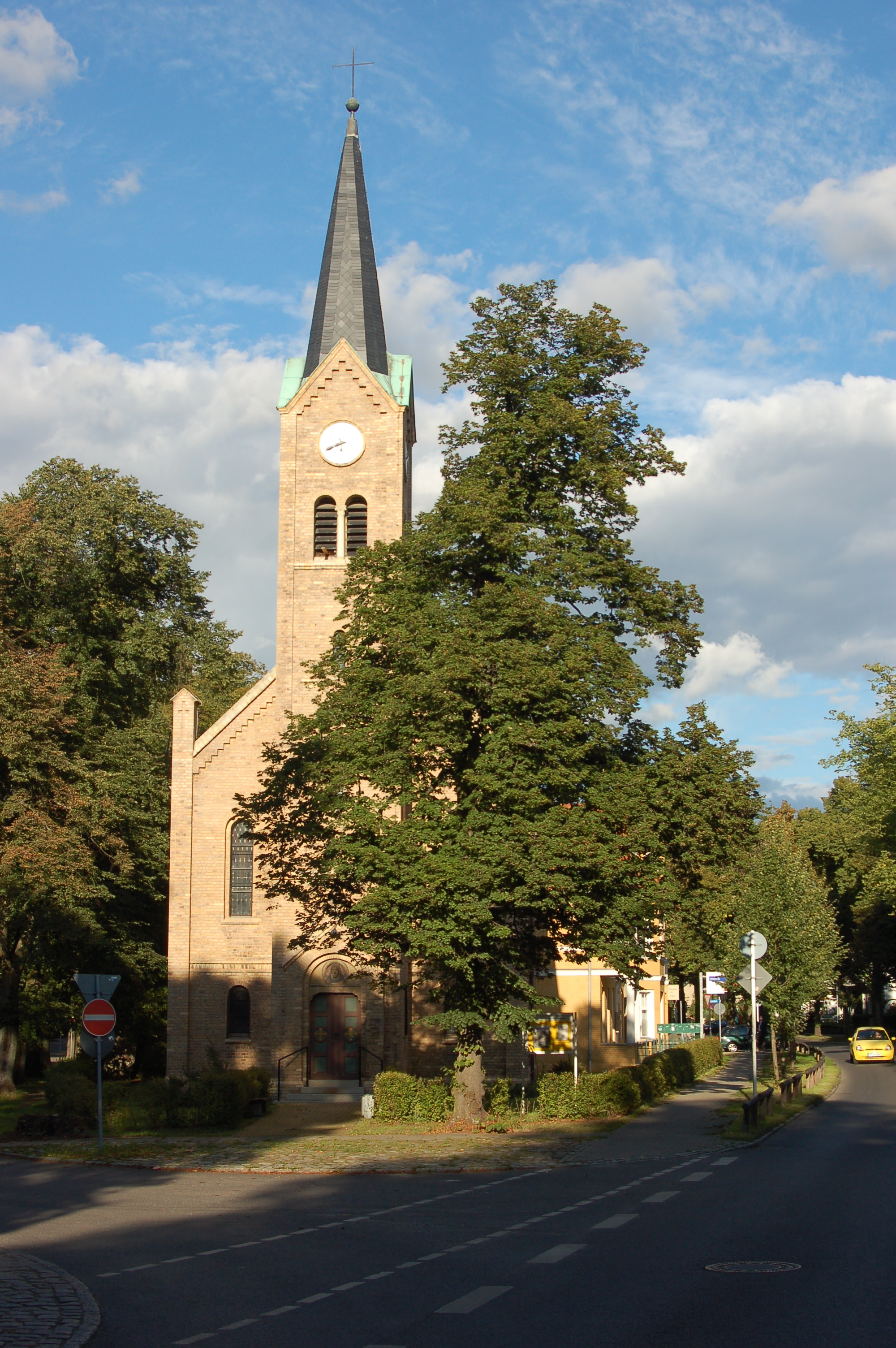
Lutheran Church.

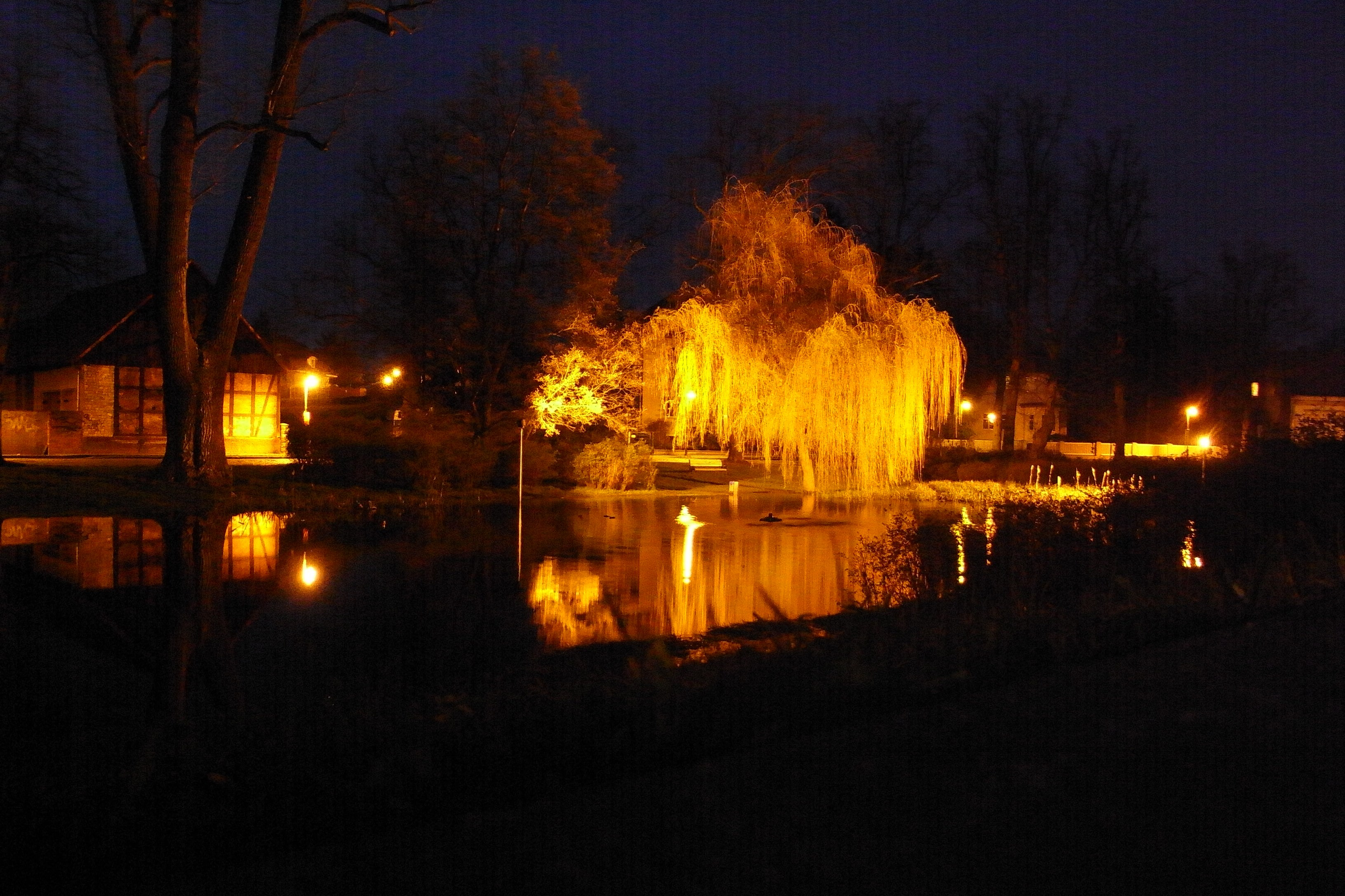
Central Pond at Night.

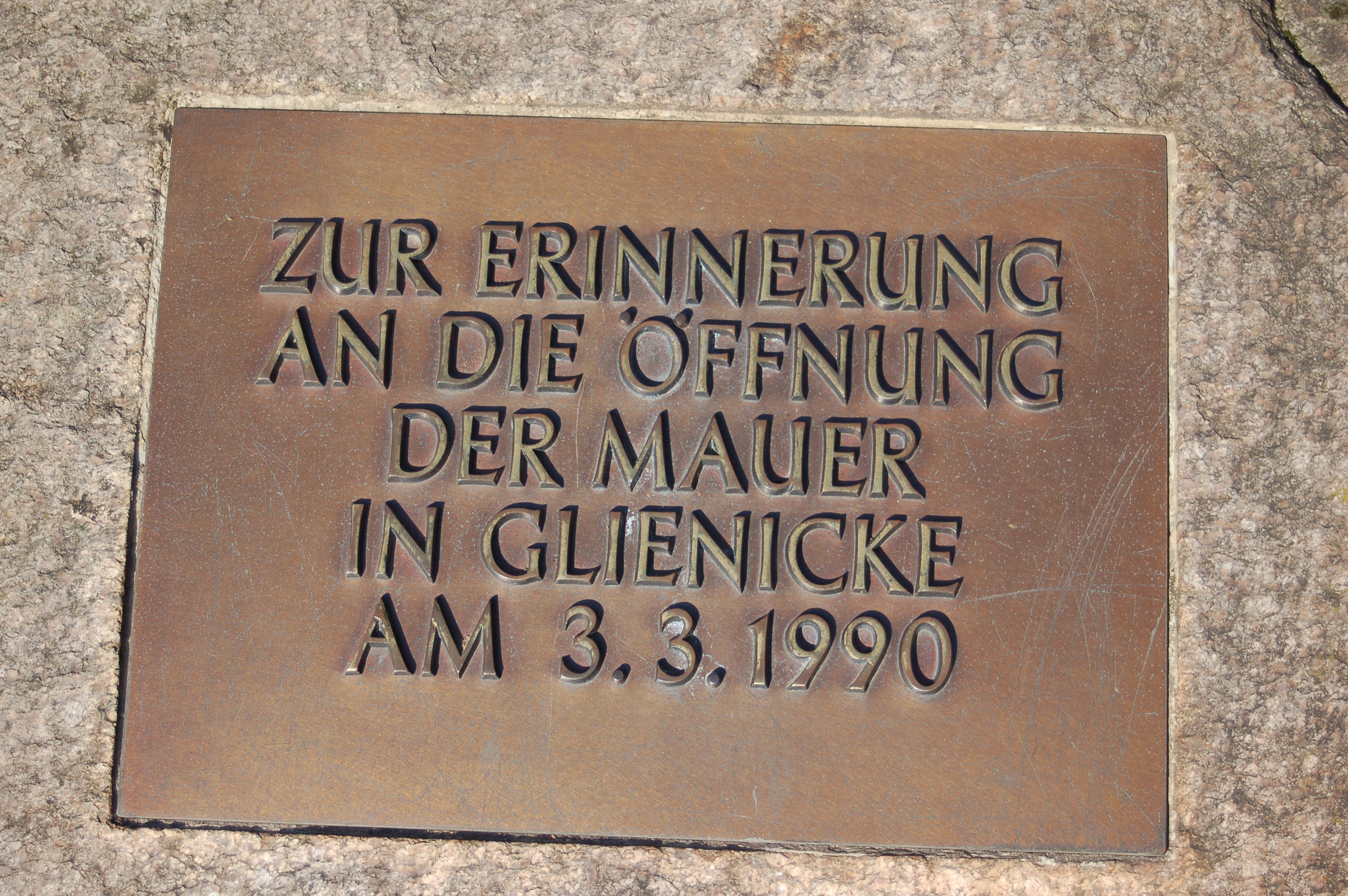
Memorial for the local opening of the Berlin Wall on March 3, 1990.

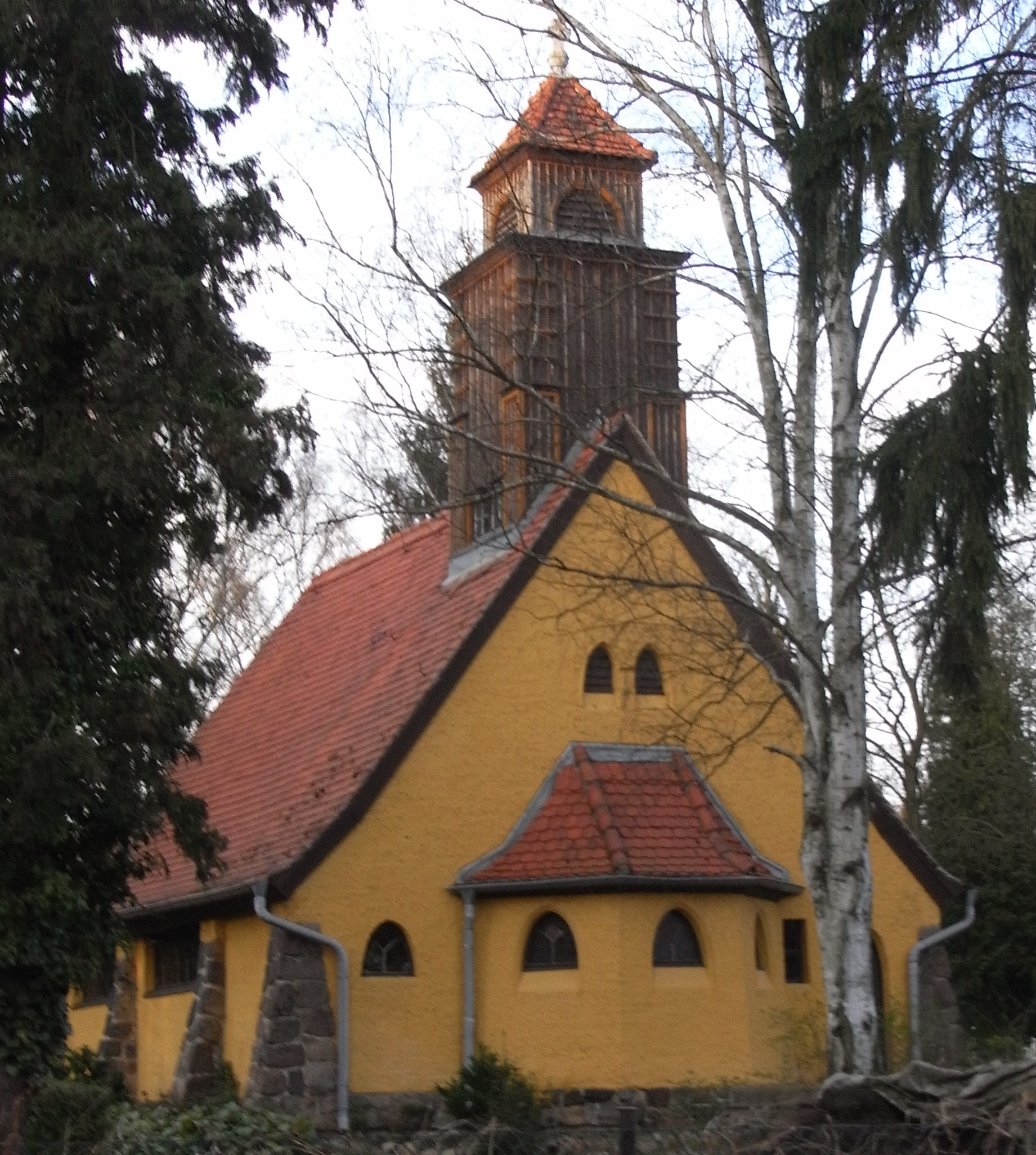
Chapel of the Cemetery.

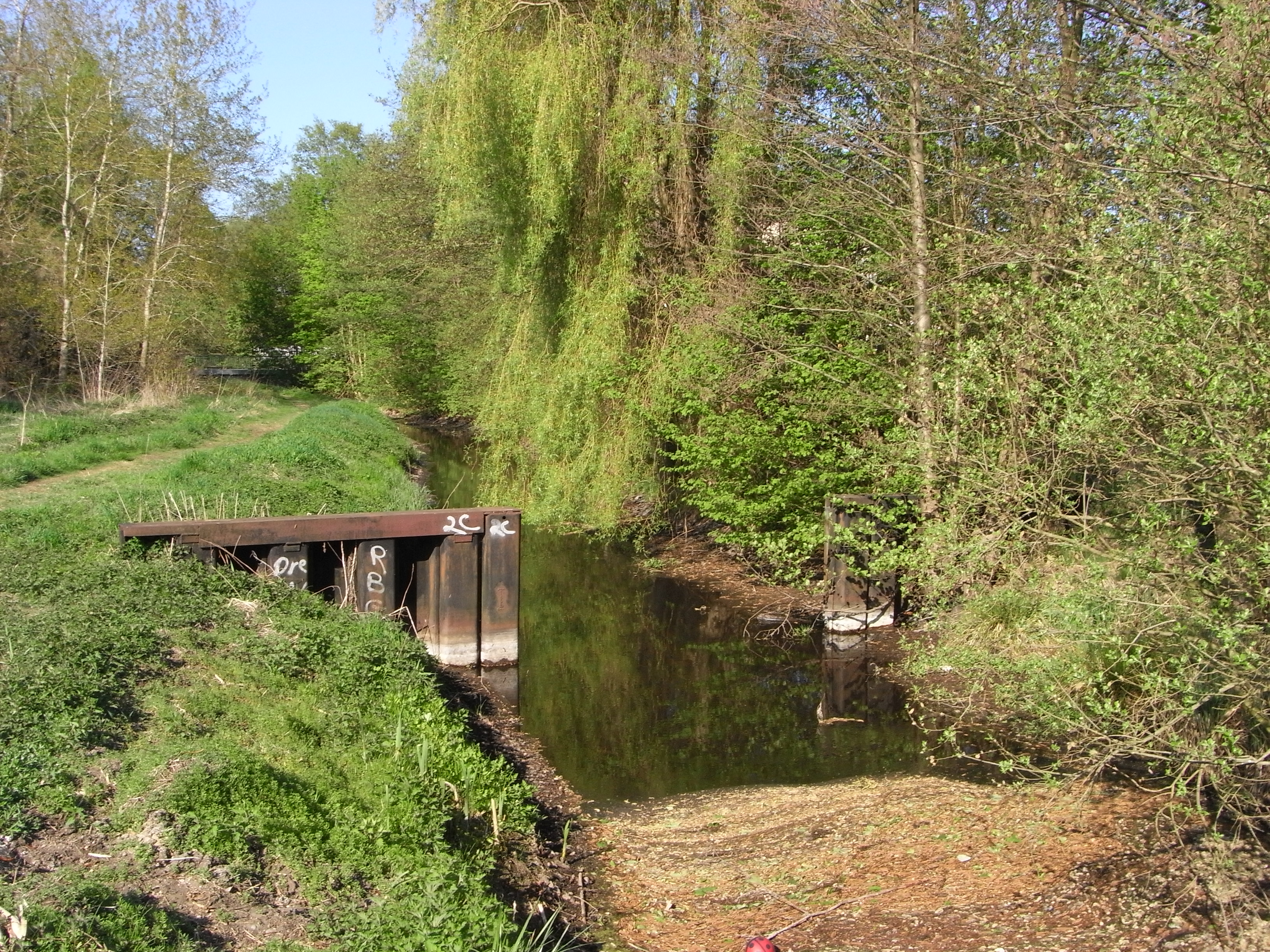
Kindelfließ-rivulet on the southern rim of Glienicke with the remains of the "water wall" that separated Glienicke (GDR) from West-Berlin.

== Politics ==
The Council consists of 22 members.

- SPD 5
- CDU 4
- Grüne 4
- AfD 2
- Linke 2
- FDP 2
- Glienicker Bürgerliste (GBL) 2
- Piratenpartei 1

(Election: May 26, 2019)

=== Mayors ===
- 1990 - 1994 Karin Röpke
- 1994 - 2010 Joachim Bienert
- 2010 - 2026 Dr. Hans G. Oberlack
- 2026 - Arno Steguweit

== Personalities ==
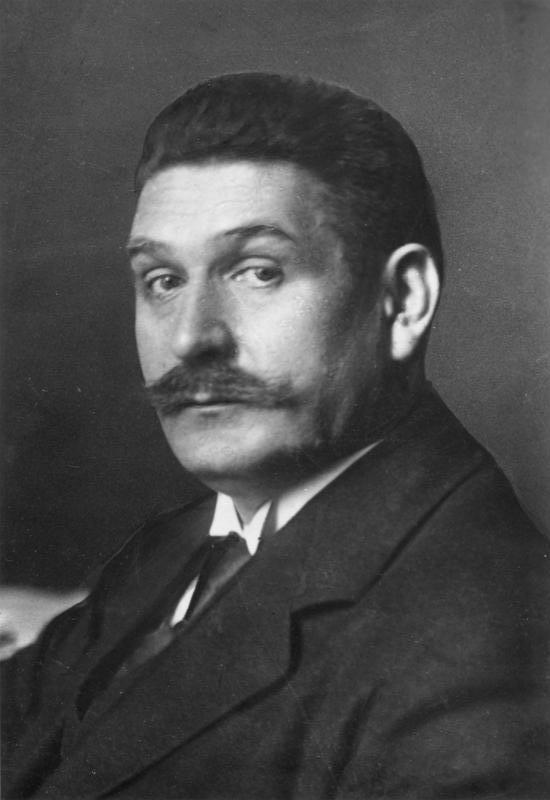
Gustav Bauer 1920

- Uwe Barschel, (1944-1987), former Prime Minister of Schleswig-Holstein, was born in Glienicke.
- Adolf von Trotha (1868-1940), Admiral of the Imperial Navy and Admiralty, was buried in the cemetery of the parish Glienicke / Nordbahn
- Gustav Bauer (1870-1944), 1919-1920 Chancellor, lived from 1940 to 1944 in Glienicke / Nordbahn, in the cemetery of the parish Glienicke / Nordbahn buried
- Walter Felsenstein (1901-1975), director, had his residence in Glienicke / Nordbahn

== Freemen ==
- Adolf von Trotha (1868-1940), Admiral of the Imperial Navy and Admiralty
- Erich Schwabe (1909-2015), military leader of the volunteer fire department Glienicke / Nordbahn (1964–1976), oldest firefighter of Brandenburg
