= Gartow (Samtgemeinde) =

Samtgemeinde in Lower Saxony

- Samtgemeinde
- Location of Gartow within Lüchow-Dannenberg district
- Interactive map of Gartow
- Location within Germany Location within Lower Saxony
- Coordinates: 53°02′N 11°28′E
- Country: Germany
- State: Lower Saxony
- District: Lüchow-Dannenberg
- Seat: Gartow
- Subdivisions: 5 municipalities

Area
  - Total: 134.71 km^{2} (52.01 sq mi)

Population (2025-12-31)
  - Total: 3,474
  - Density: 25.79/km^{2} (66.79/sq mi)
- Time zone: UTC+01:00 (CET)
  - Summer (DST): UTC+02:00 (CEST)
- Website: www.gartow.de

Gartow is a Samtgemeinde ("collective municipality") in the district of Lüchow-Dannenberg, in Lower Saxony, Germany. Its seat is in the village Gartow.

The Samtgemeinde Gartow consists of the following municipalities:

1. Gartow
2. Gorleben
3. Höhbeck
4. Prezelle
5. Schnackenburg
