= Berlin-Hermsdorf station =

Railway station in Germany

Coordinates: 52°37′04″N 13°18′25″E

Berlin-Hermsdorf
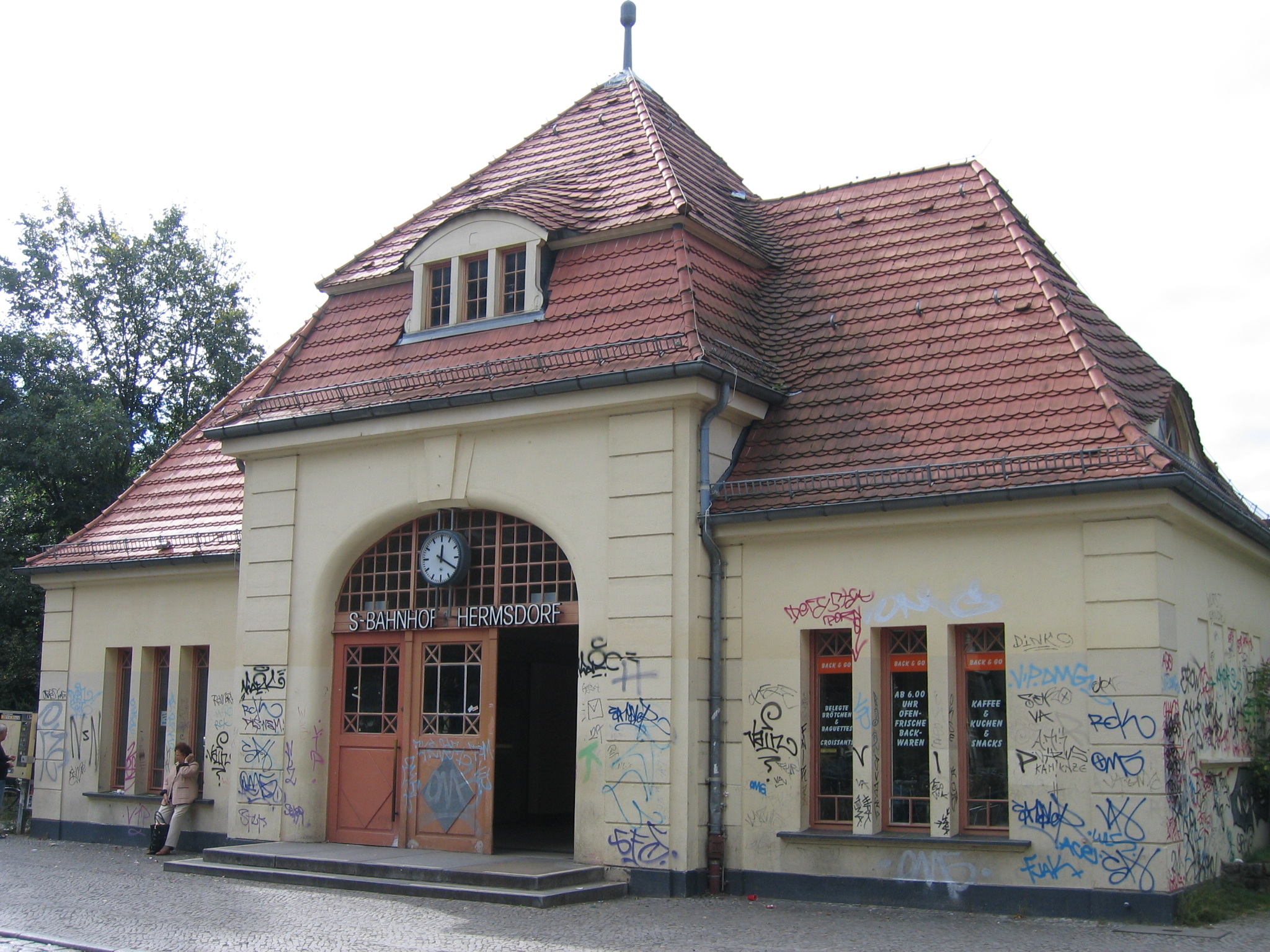

General information
- Location: Hermsdorf, Berlin; Germany
- Line: Northern Railway

Other information
- Station code: 0543
- DS100 code: BHED
- Category: 4
- Fare zone: VBB: Berlin B/5656

History
- Opened: 10 May 1877; 149 years ago
- Electrified: 5 June 1925; 101 years ago

Services
Preceding station	Berlin S-Bahn	Following station
Frohnau towards Oranienburg	S1	Waidmannslust towards Wannsee
Location

Berlin-Hermsdorf (in German S-Bahnhof Berlin-Hermsdorf) is a railway station in the neighbourhood of Hermsdorf, in the city of Berlin, Germany. It is served by the Berlin S-Bahn and by several local buses.

== History ==
The station was opened on 10 July 1877 under the name Hermsdorf (Mark) as a ground-level station of the northern railway. First, only long-distance trains drove the route, a first suburban traffic with steam trains developed around the year 1900. Since in Hermsdorf at that time developed extensive residential district and the place developed into one of the largest along the route, the long-distance service remained nonetheless. However, the mixed operation between the two classes of trains proved to be a permanent problem, which is why in 1908 the four-track extension of the line to Hermsdorf was decided. Between 1909 and 1910, work was carried out to build the track; Most stations were completed by 1912.

Since the station in Hermsdorf should be moved further north in order to be able to open up the villa area better, first the old platform had to be used. While the work was still under way, it was decided to continue the suburban railroad to Frohnau, where another villa settlement was built. Under these circumstances, the work dragged on until April 1913. The new station had two middle platforms for suburban traffic, connected to a three-track sweeper and a small freight yard.

At the end of the 1910s, the Prussian government decided to electrify the three northern sections of Berlin - the Stettiner, Kremmener and Nordbahn - the latter to Hermsdorf. First, the AC operation over overhead line was given preference. In 1922, however, the Free State decided in favor of the DC operation via lateral busbar. In addition, the electrical operation should be extended to Oranienburg. After the Szczecin Railway initially took up electrical operation on 8 August 1924 - today's S-Bahn - the Northern Railway on the section Gesundbrunnen-Hermsdorf-Birkenwerder followed on 5 June 1925. The remaining piece to Oranienburg followed on 3 October the same year. As the suburban trains operated on schedule at least to Birkenwerder, the long-distance transport was omitted, the platform was demolished in 1933.

Since the Berlin city limits on 1 October 1920 extended as a result of the Greater Berlin Act to behind Frohnau, followed in 1937-38 renaming the still valid name Berlin-Hermsdorf.

After 1945, the section Wilhelmsruh-Birkenwerder was reduced to one track each for long-distance and commuter rail. Since there were no deviations along the route, the trains could only run at hourly intervals. Only in 1948 was the clock by two dodges in Waidmannslust and Frohnau compressed to 20 minutes, Hermsdorf, however, remained single-tracked. After 1952, in addition, the long-distance traffic in the Berlin area, since the route was now in the western part of the city, abandoned, the tracks were not used for the expansion of the S -Bahn line.

Despite the shrinking passenger numbers as a result of the S-Bahn boycott, which began after 1961, operations along the northern runway were maintained and continued even after the Reichsbahn strike in 1980. Only with the assumption of the operating rights by the BVG on 9 January 1984 was the short-term decommissioning. Since the passengers after the takeover with massive protests for an operation pronounced, was already on 1 October 1984 the traffic resumed until Frohnau. However, this only lasted until May 1986, the route was then shut down, removed and rebuilt double track. The also decommissioned freight yard was not put back into operation after completion of the work. On 22 December 1986 the work was completed. After German reunification, traffic was resumed via the West Berlin city border as far as Oranienburg.

Since December 2014, the train driver takes place by means of the driver's cab monitor (ZAT-FM), previously the station was occupied by a local supervision.
