= Nienwalde =

Coordinates: 53.0058°N 11.4881°E

Nienwalde is a village in Gartow in Lower Saxony, Germany. It belongs to the county Lüchow-Dannenberg and it is situated near the border to Saxony-Anhalt.

The municipality is around 6,34 km^{2}, and the number of inhabitants amounts to 307.

== History ==
In 1360, Nienwalde, formerly known as Nygendorp, was mentioned in a document for the first time. After Nygendorp became part of the Electorate of Hanover in 1690, it was renamed into Niendorf. On the 24th of December, a fire destroyed 20 courts. After 7 weeks the town was rebuilt a few hundred meters south of the old position. In order to protect against further fires, oaks were planted around the courts. Eventually, in 1936 Niendorf was named Nienwalde. The former boundary to the German Democratic republic was only one kilometer away. On July 1, 1972, Nienwalde was incorporated into Gartow.

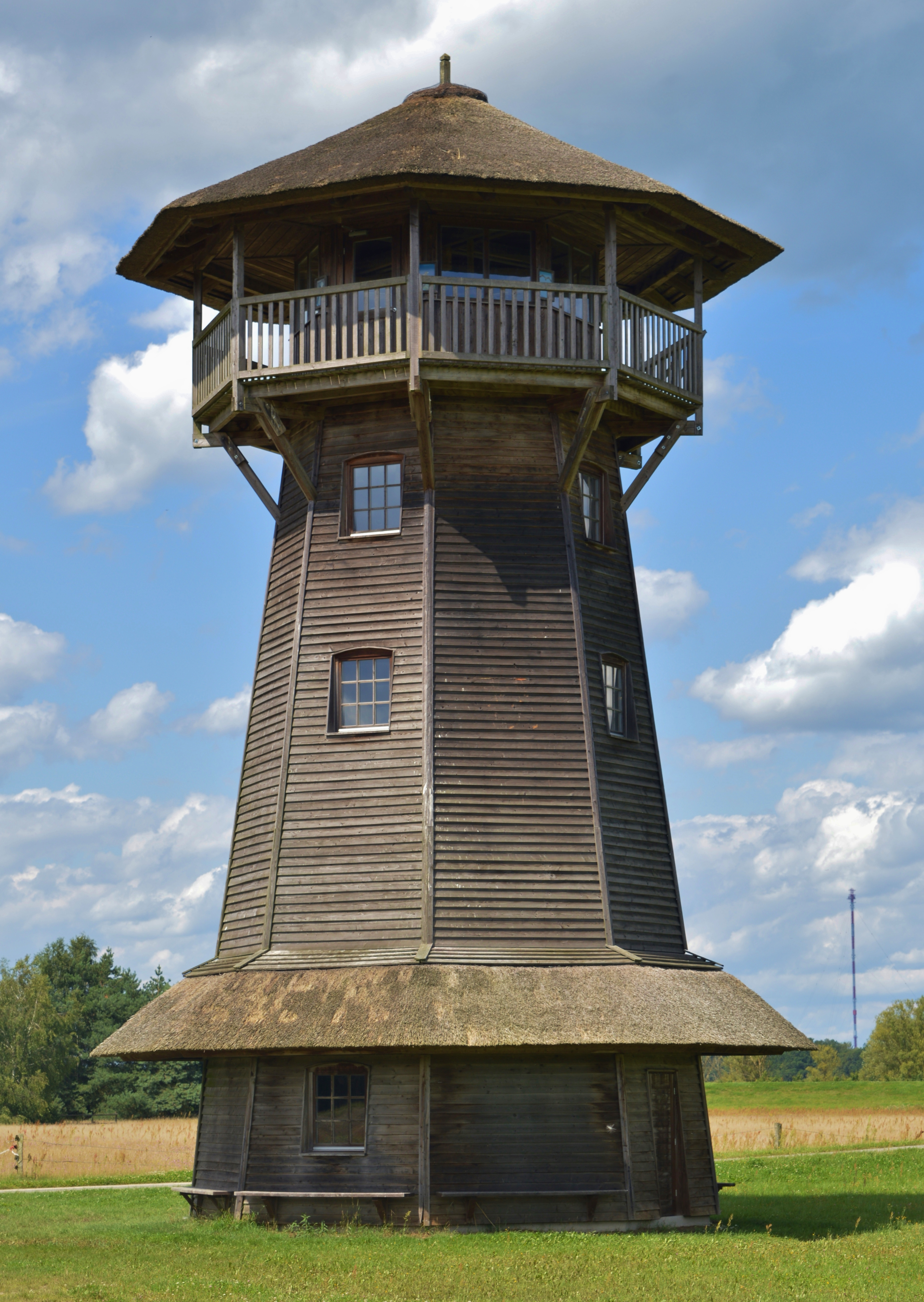
Klaus-Bahlsen tower, Nienwalde

== Points of interest ==
The 2007 opened observation tower Klaus-Bahlsen-Turm is built for watching Sea eagles.

=== Nature ===
Not far from the town, there is a beaver-observation-path.

Nienwalde is mostly surrounded by large areas of pine forest, which form an Unincorporated area.
