= Prezelle =

- Municipality
- Location of Prezelle within Lüchow-Dannenberg district
- Interactive map of Prezelle
- Location within Germany Location within Lower Saxony
- Coordinates: 52°58′N 11°24′E
- Country: Germany
- State: Lower Saxony
- District: Lüchow-Dannenberg
- Municipal assoc.: Gartow
- Subdivisions: 3 Ortsteile

Government
  - Mayor: Hartmut Heitmann (CDU)

Area
  - Total: 41.51 km^{2} (16.03 sq mi)
- Elevation: 26 m (85 ft)

Population (2025-12-31)
  - Total: 409
  - Density: 9.85/km^{2} (25.5/sq mi)
- Time zone: UTC+01:00 (CET)
  - Summer (DST): UTC+02:00 (CEST)
- Postal codes: 29491
- Dialling codes: 05848
- Vehicle registration: DAN

Prezelle is a municipality in the district Lüchow-Dannenberg, in Lower Saxony, Germany.
