= Fernmeldeturm Berlin =

Telecommunication tower in Berlin-Wannsee, Germany

Coordinates: 52°25′02″N 13°07′39″E

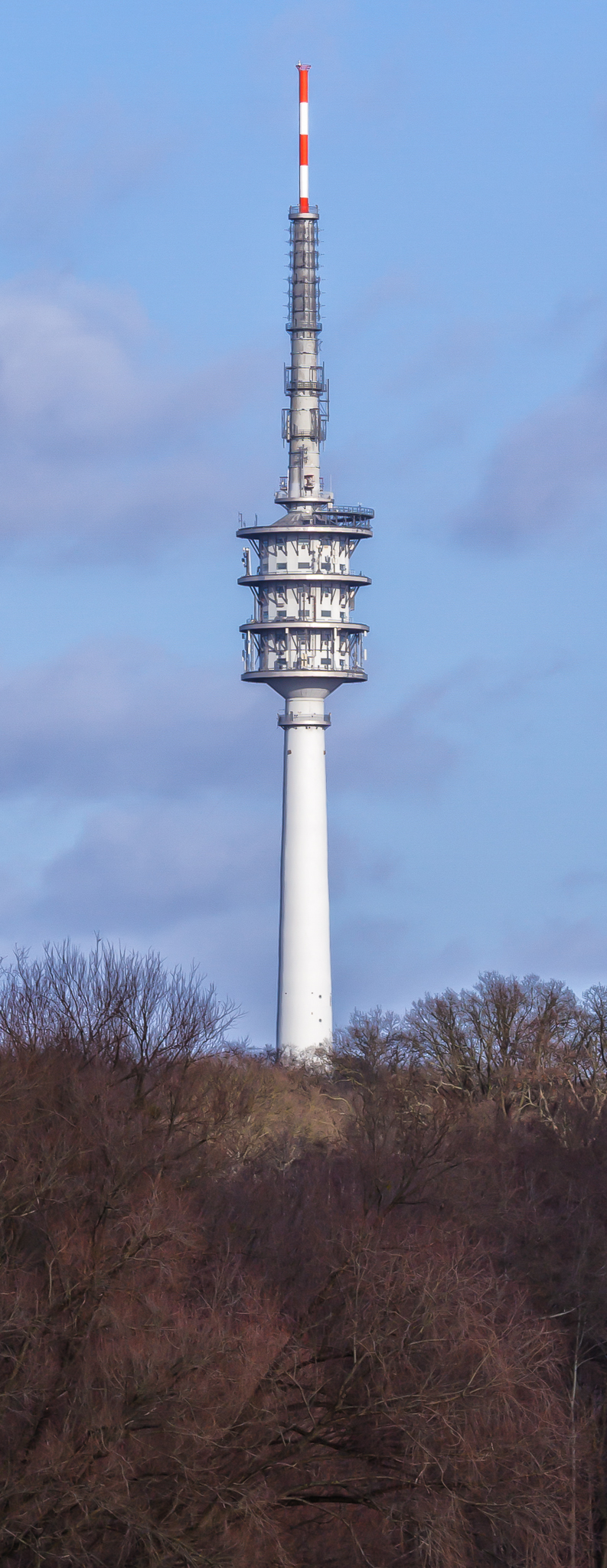
The Fernmeldeturm Berlin

The Fernmeldeturm Berlin (Telecommunications Tower Berlin) is a telecommunication tower located atop the Schäferberg hill in Berlin-Wannsee. The tower was built between 1961 and 1964, and is not open to the public. Owner and operator of the site is Deutsche Funkturm (DFMG), a subsidiary of Deutsche Telekom.

The Fernmeldeturm Berlin is 212 metres (696 ft) tall, and its steel-reinforced concrete shaft extends to a height of 187 metres (614 ft). Between 101 and 132 metres (331 and 433 ft) in elevation, the tower houses six floors for technical equipment. This currently consists of transmitters for DVB-T digital television, analog FM radio, and newer DAB and DMB digital radio.

From 1964 to the early nineties, the tower was used to implement two over-the-horizon radio links to the rest of West Germany. The city of Berlin was geographically isolated, so unusual means were necessary to bridge the distance. One such link used bundled arrays of directional antennas mounted near the top to establish a near-line-of sight connection at 250 MHz and 400 MHz to the tower at Gartow. The other used tropospheric scatter at 2 GHz to establish a non-line-of-sight link to Torfhaus. To that end the tower was equipped with two Parabolic reflector antennas, each 18 metres (59 ft) in diameter, which were mounted on the lower portion of the tower. They were removed in 1996. Because of these aerials, the Fernmeldeturm Berlin had to be designed to withstand triple the wind loading of the comparably sized TV tower in Stuttgart. The concrete shaft is thus 12 metres (39 ft) in diameter at the bottom, with a wall thickness of 55 centimetres (22 in). At the 97-metre (318 ft) mark, the shaft is only 7 metres (23 ft) in diameter.

Directly adjacent to the Fernmeldeturm Berlin is a free standing steel framework tower. Formerly it supported two 10-metre (33 ft) diameter parabolic aerials for an over-the-horizon radio link, also to Torfhaus. These have since been removed. It is now predominantly used for cellular network aerials.

Since 2001, the Fernmeldeturm Berlin is also used for transmissions in the medium wave range on 1485 kHz in DRM mode. Since the tower was not designed to accommodate this frequency range, a long wire aerial was installed for this purpose.

In 2026 the tower is home to 89.2 MHz (Radio Potsdam), 90.7 MHz (Ella Radio), and 94.8 MHz (BBC World Service) among others.

== Gallery ==
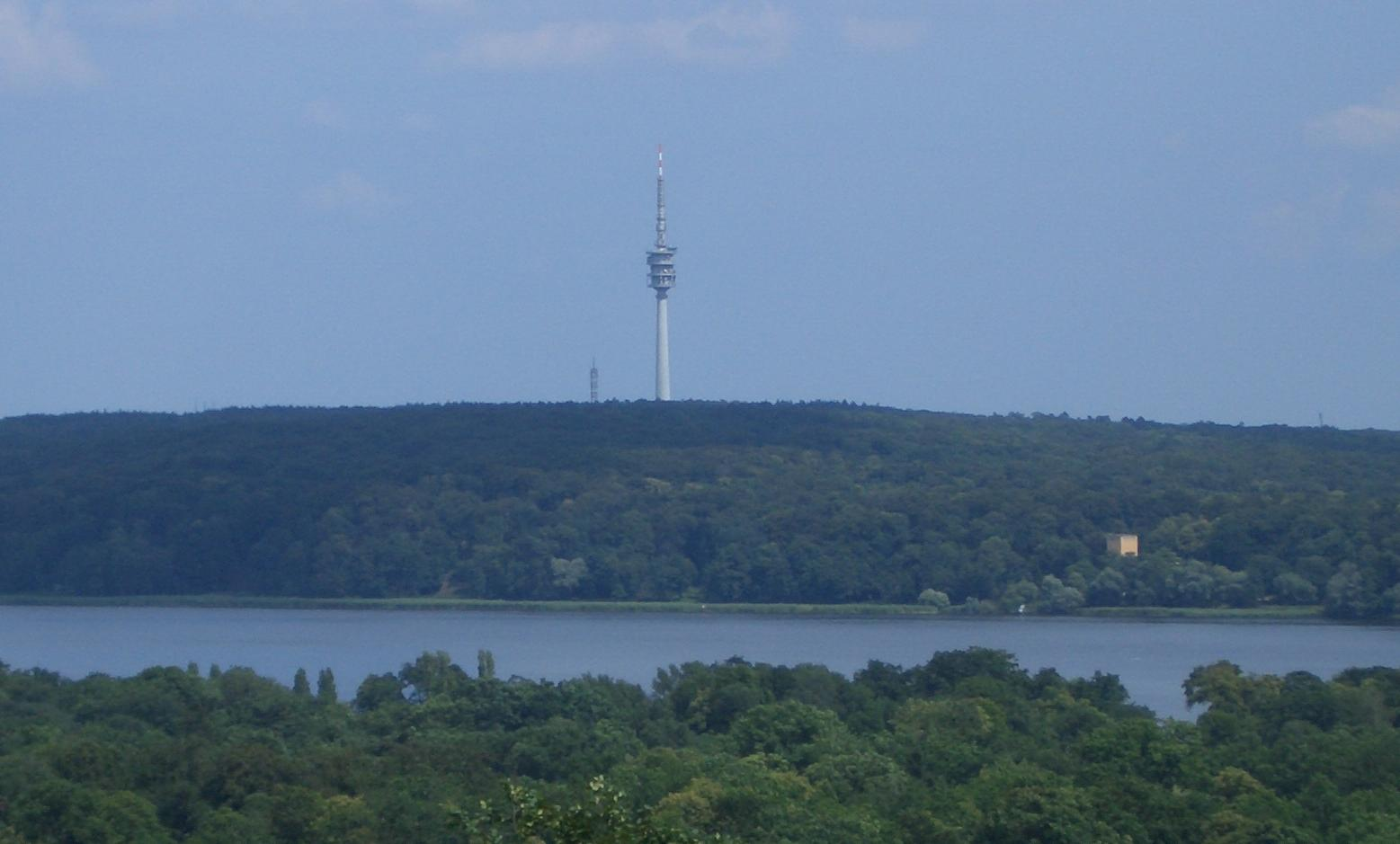
The Fernmeldeturm viewed from the Belvedere Palace in Potsdam

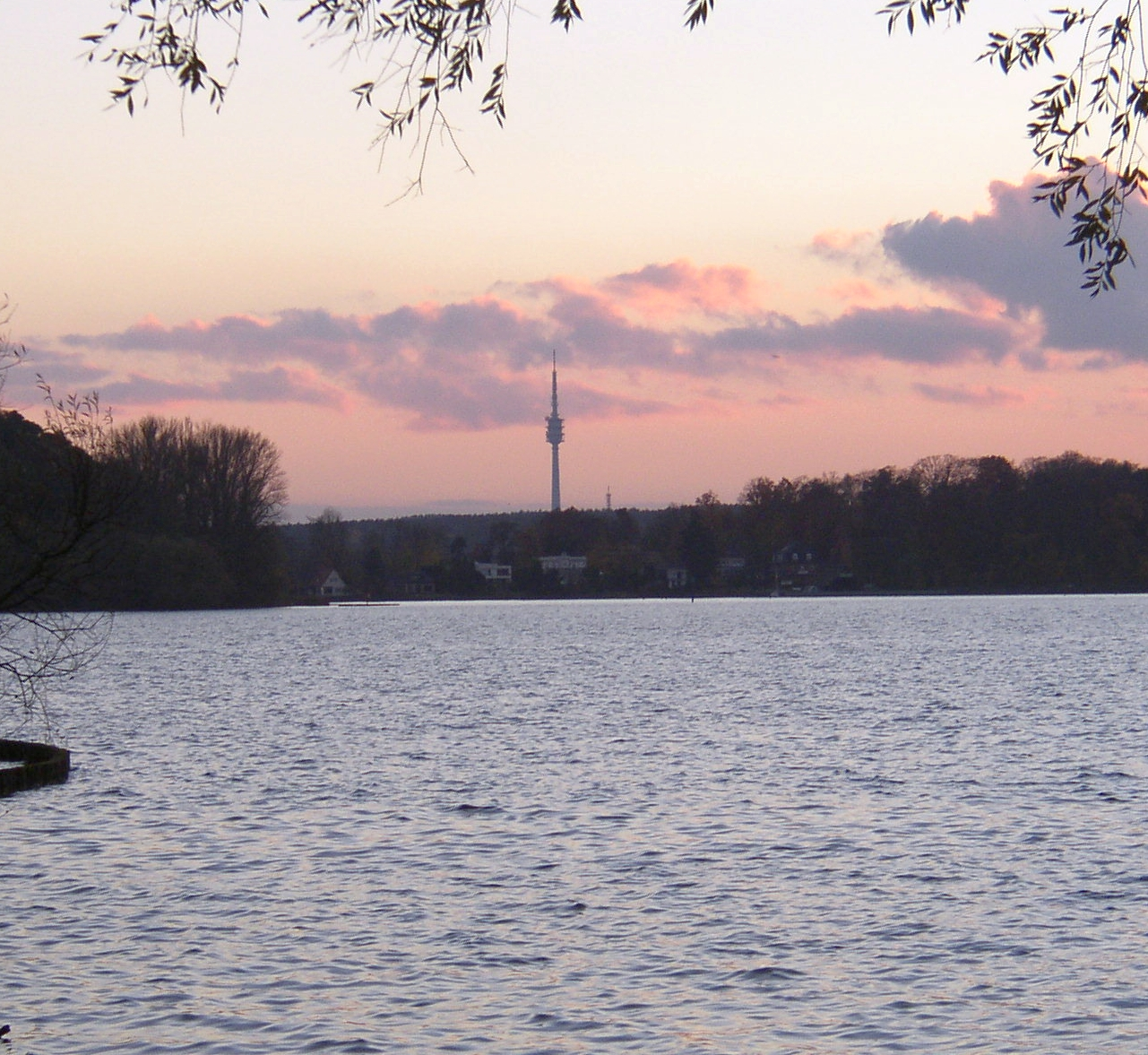
The Fernmeldeturm viewed from Große Steinlanke

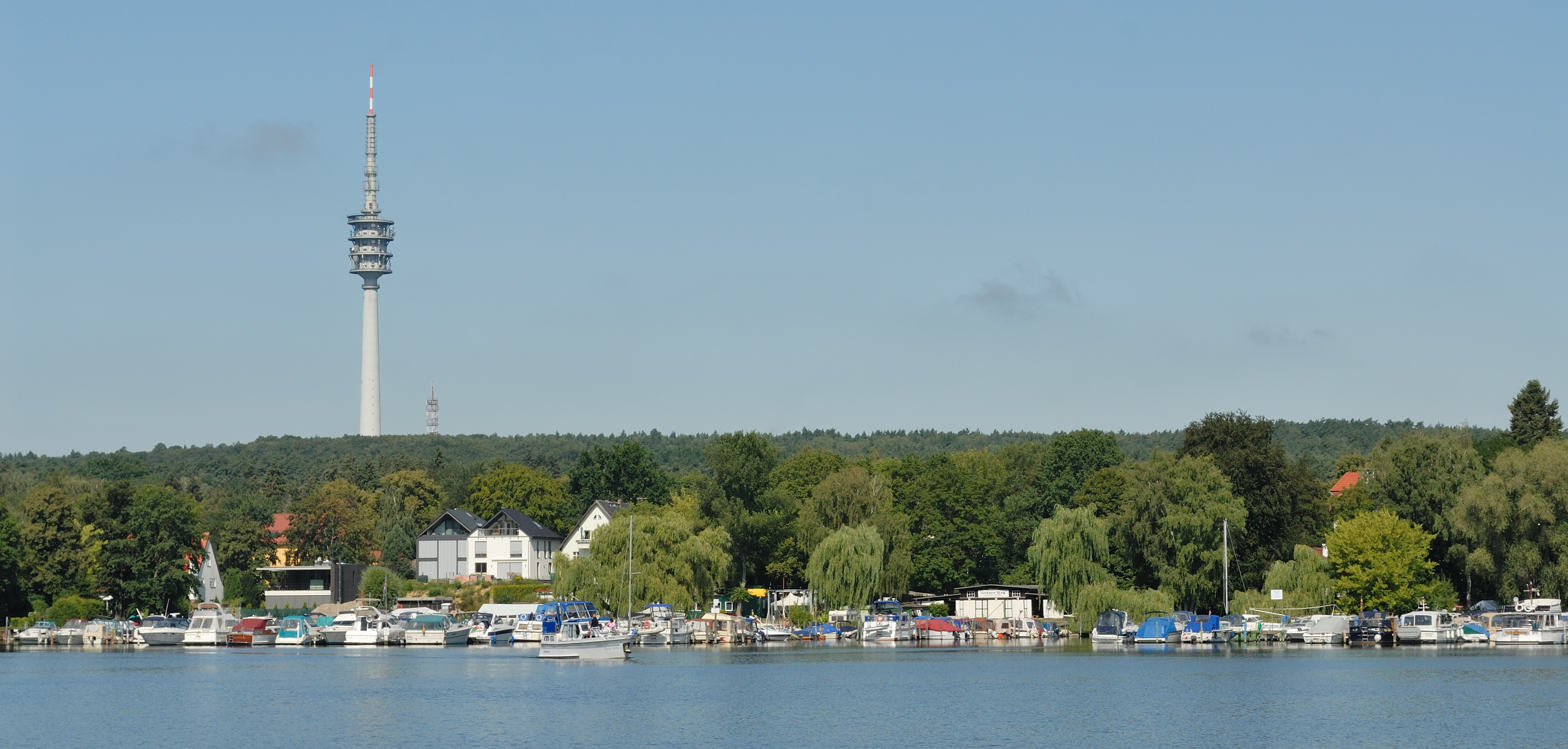
Tower viewed across Pohlesee

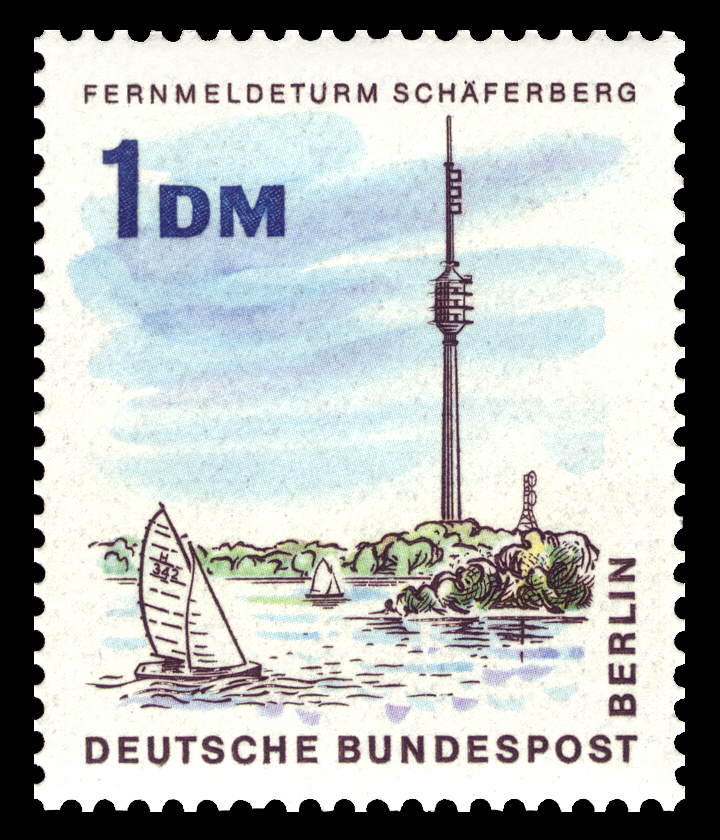
Commemorative Berlin postage stamp from 1965

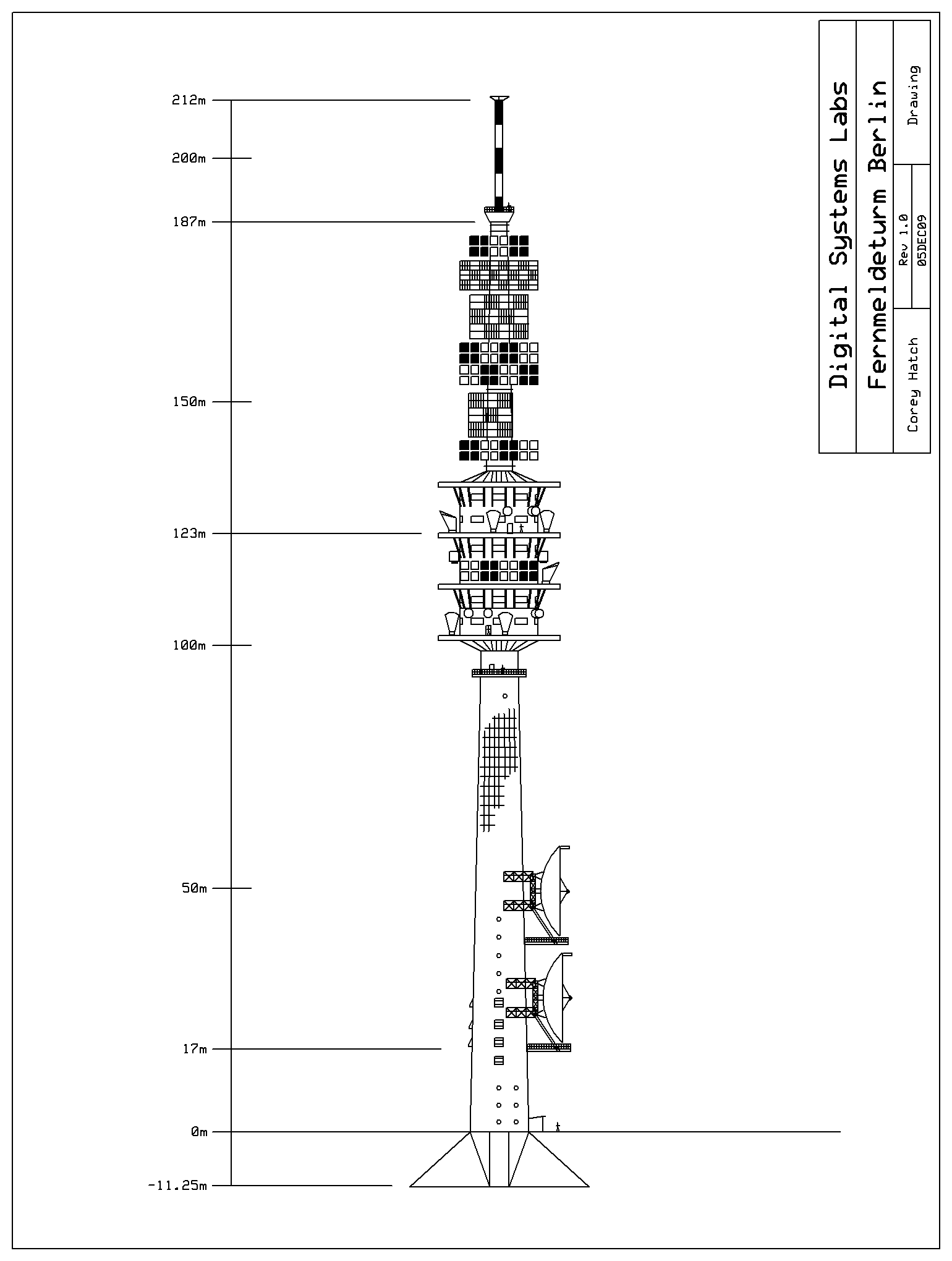
Line drawing of the Fernmeldeturm showing its 1975 state

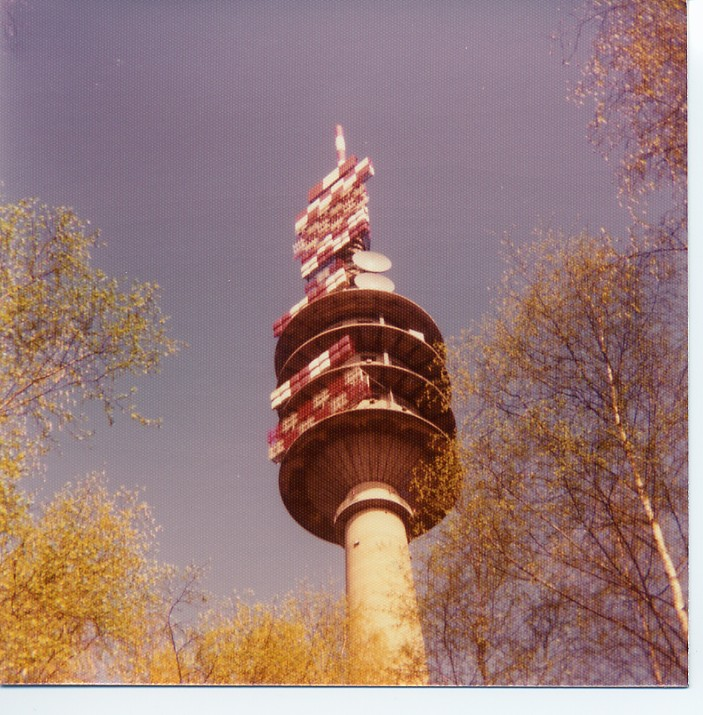
The Fernmeldeturm sporting its former array of directional antennas pointing to Gartow

== See also ==
- List of tallest towers
