= Richtfunkstelle Berlin-Frohnau =

Radio station facility

Coordinates: 52°39′11″N 13°17′44″E

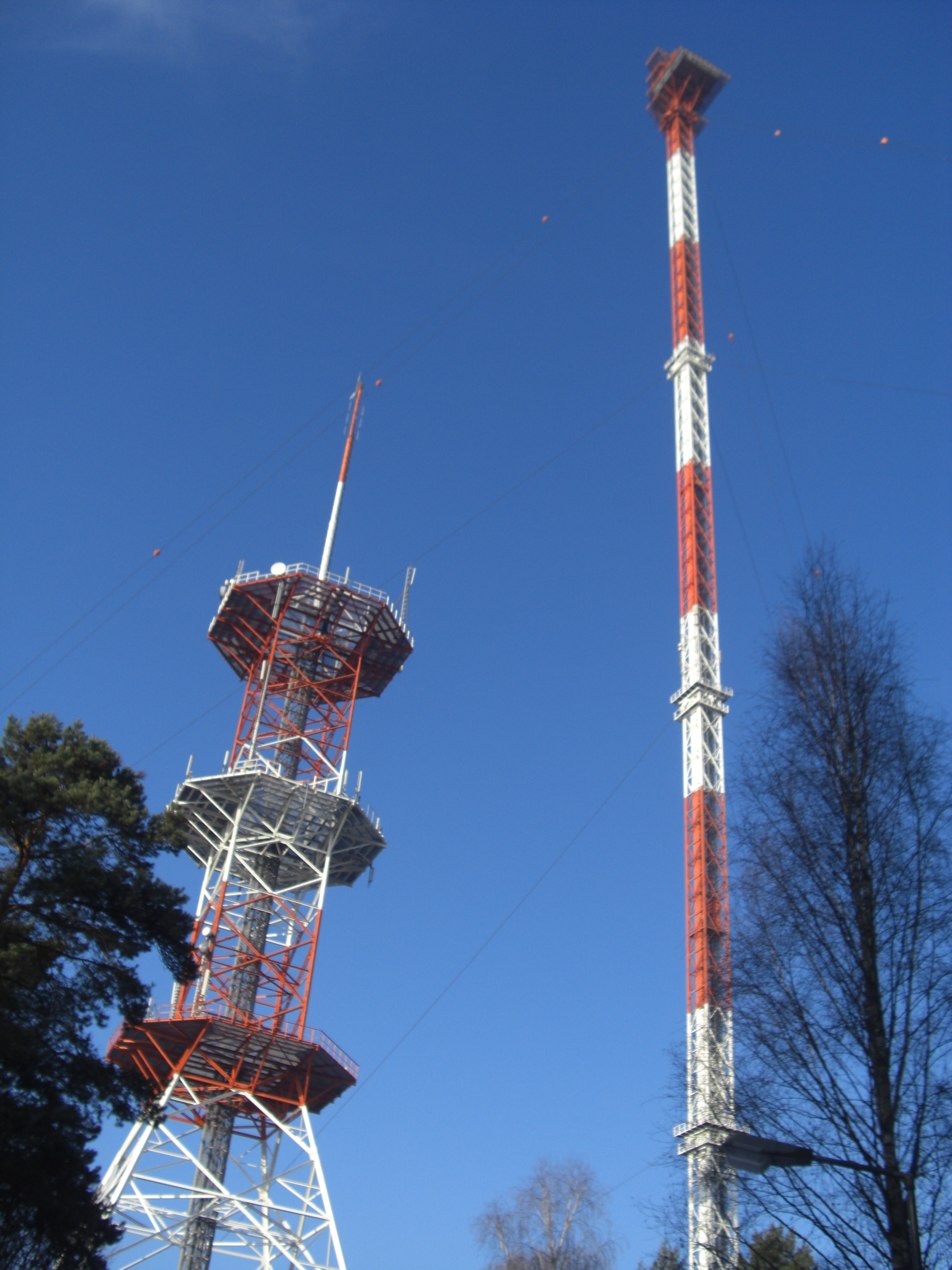
Radio tower and mast

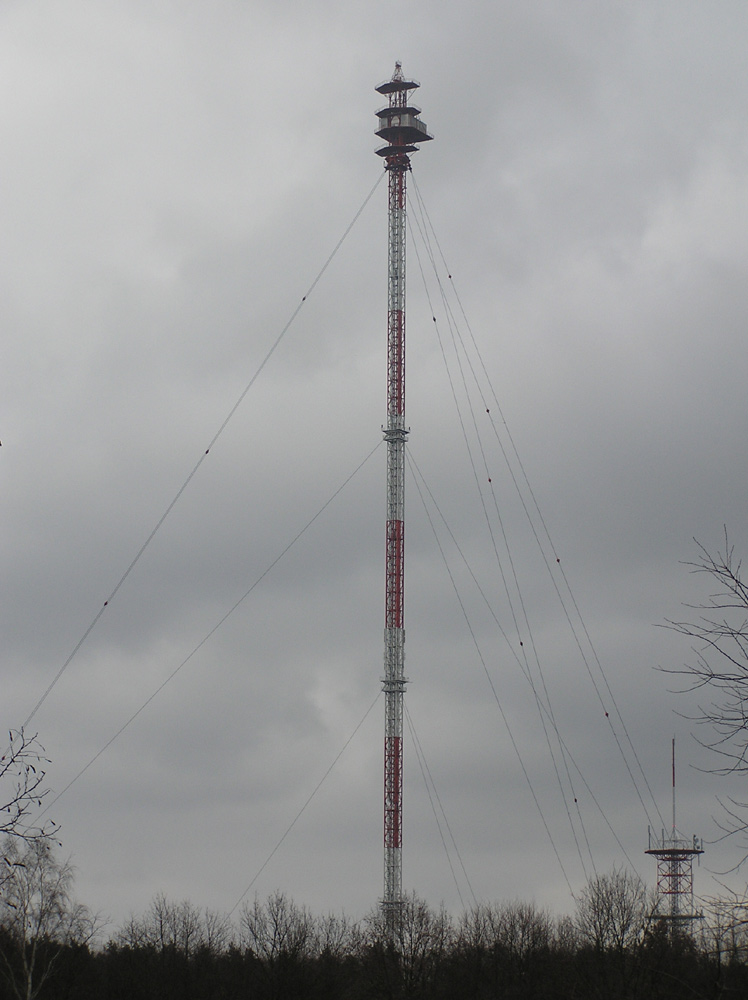
Radio mast

The Richtfunkstelle Berlin-Frohnau (Directional radio station Berlin-Frohnau) was a facility for directional radio services in Frohnau (a locality in the Reinickendorf borough of Berlin; during the Cold War, the northernmost locality of West Berlin). Before German reunification, the facility served as a microwave transmission link between West Berlin and West Germany.

It first used only an overhorizon directional link. For this link between 1970 and 1973 a 117.5 m high free-standing steelframe work tower was built. This tower was equipped with parabolic dishes of 18 m diameter for an overhorizon link to Gartow in Lower Saxony.

From 1977 onward a 358.6 m high guyed mast for conventional directional service was built. It carries on a platform aerials for directional services toward Gartow and Clenze, both in Lower Saxony.

At a height of 300 metres, there was a room for technical equipment measuring 4 by 5 metres. This room was the highest floor of all structures in the European Union at the time of the tower's demolition.

Since 2002 there have been test transmissions for DRM on the medium wave frequency 1485 kHz. Because neither of the towers was designed for use as aerial for AM transmission, a long wire aerial on a 10 m high mast was built.

The radio mast was demolished on February 8, 2009 shortly after 1pm local time.

== See also ==
- List of masts
- List of towers
