= Berlin-Frohnau station =

Railway station in Reinickendorf, Germany

Coordinates: 52.6325°N 13.2902°E

Frohnau
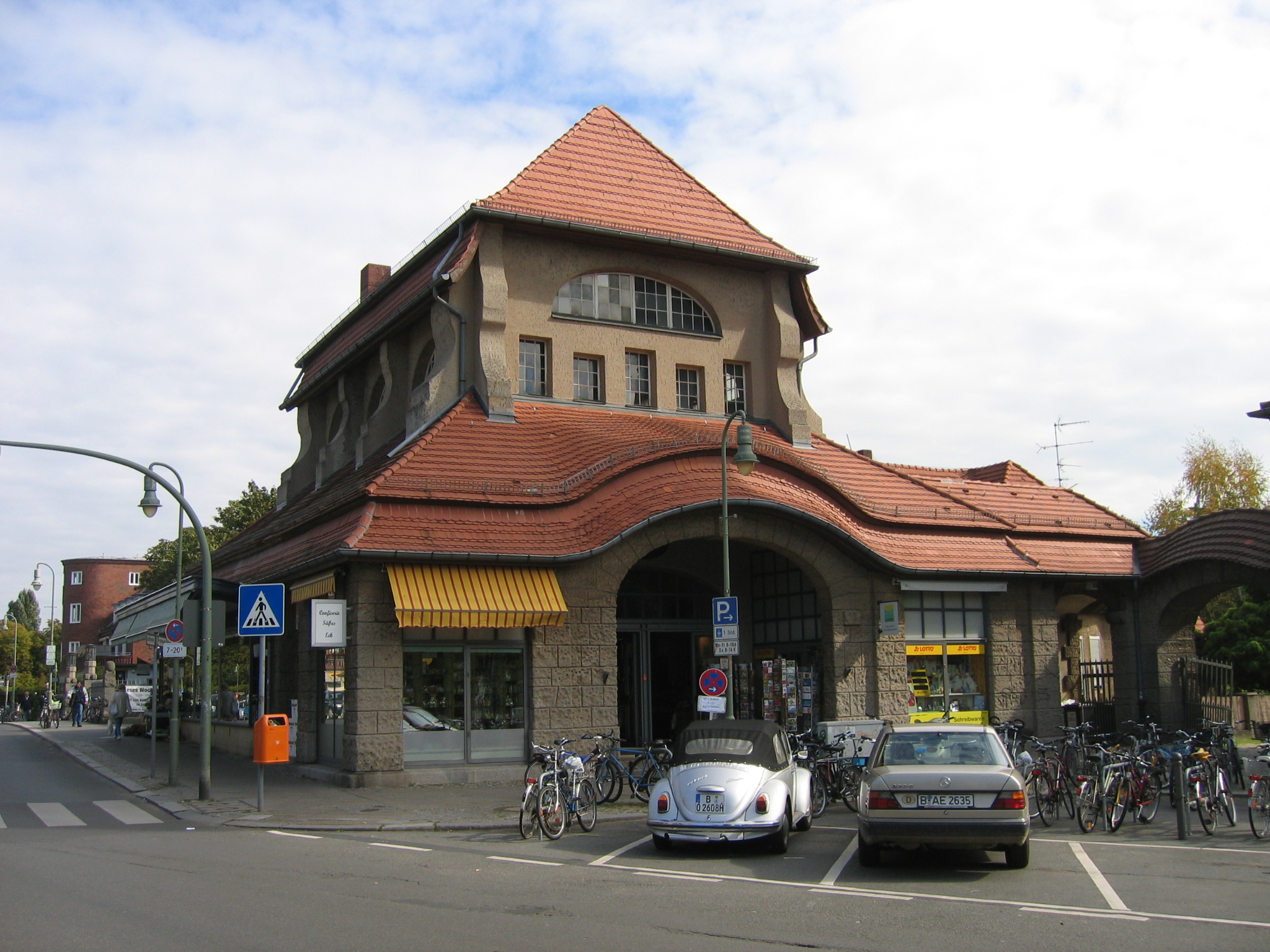

General information
- Location: Frohnau, Berlin; Germany
- Line: Northern Railway

Construction
- Architect: Gustav Hart and Alfred Lesser

Other information
- Station code: 0539
- DS100 code: BFOH
- Category: 4
- Fare zone: VBB: Berlin B/5656

History
- Opened: 1 May 1910; 116 years ago
- Electrified: 5 June 1925; 101 years ago
- Former names: till 1 February 1938 Frohnau (Mark)

Key dates
- 1908-1910: building erected

Services
Preceding station	Berlin S-Bahn	Following station
Hohen Neuendorf towards Oranienburg	S1	Hermsdorf towards Wannsee
Location

Berlin-Frohnau (in German S-Bahnhof Berlin-Frohnau) is a railway station in the neighbourhood of Frohnau, in the city of Berlin, Germany. It is served by the Berlin S-Bahn and by several local buses.
