= Höhbeck =

- Municipality
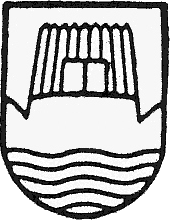
- Coat of arms

- Location of Höhbeck within Lüchow-Dannenberg district
- Interactive map of Höhbeck
- Location within Germany Location within Lower Saxony
- Coordinates: 53°03′17″N 11°25′59″E
- Country: Germany
- State: Lower Saxony
- District: Lüchow-Dannenberg
- Municipal assoc.: Gartow
- Subdivisions: 4 Ortsteile

Government
  - Mayor: Ulrich Brünicke

Area
  - Total: 19.5 km^{2} (7.5 sq mi)
- Elevation: 16–76 m (52–249 ft)

Population (2025-12-31)
  - Total: 633
  - Density: 32.5/km^{2} (84.1/sq mi)
- Time zone: UTC+01:00 (CET)
  - Summer (DST): UTC+02:00 (CEST)
- Postal codes: 29478
- Dialling codes: 05846
- Vehicle registration: DAN

Höhbeck (German pronunciation: [ˈhøːbeːk]) is a municipality in the district Lüchow-Dannenberg, in Lower Saxony, Germany.
