= Gartow =

- Municipality
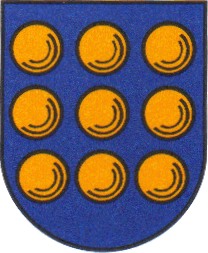
- Coat of arms

- Location of Gartow within Lüchow-Dannenberg district
- Interactive map of Gartow
- Location within Germany Location within Lower Saxony
- Coordinates: 53°01′26″N 11°27′27″E
- Country: Germany
- State: Lower Saxony
- District: Lüchow-Dannenberg
- Municipal assoc.: Gartow
- Subdivisions: 3 Ortsteile

Government
  - Mayor: Hans-Udo Maury (CDU)

Area
  - Total: 28.28 km^{2} (10.92 sq mi)
- Elevation: 17 m (56 ft)

Population (2025-12-31)
  - Total: 1,355
  - Density: 47.91/km^{2} (124.1/sq mi)
- Time zone: UTC+01:00 (CET)
  - Summer (DST): UTC+02:00 (CEST)
- Postal codes: 29471
- Dialling codes: 05846
- Vehicle registration: DAN
- Website: www.gartow.de

Gartow is a municipality in the district Lüchow-Dannenberg, in Lower Saxony, Germany. It is situated in the easternmost tip of Lower Saxony, not far from the river Elbe, approx. 30 km northeast of Salzwedel, and 20 km west of Wittenberge. Gartow is also the seat of the Samtgemeinde ("collective municipality") Gartow.

== Geography ==
Gartow is located in the historical region Wendland, at the west shore of the river Seege, which is artificially formed to the Gartower See.

The Laasche and Nienwalde villages are located in the municipality.

== Points of interest ==
At Gartow, there is a facility for FM and TV transmission, with two 300+ metre tall guyed masts, the Gartow-Höhbeck transmitter. On August 20, 2009, the smaller mast was demolished with explosives. Until the German reunification, this transmitter was also used as a directional radio link to West Berlin's Fernmeldeturm Berlin, while the taller tower was connected to Richtfunkstelle Berlin-Frohnau. The taller mast had a closed cabinet holding technical equipment at 325 metres, making it the EU's highest closed room on a man-made structure.

Nearby Gorleben is a proposed deposit for nuclear waste. This led to much controversy and protests in the area.
