= Frohnau =

- Quarter of Berlin
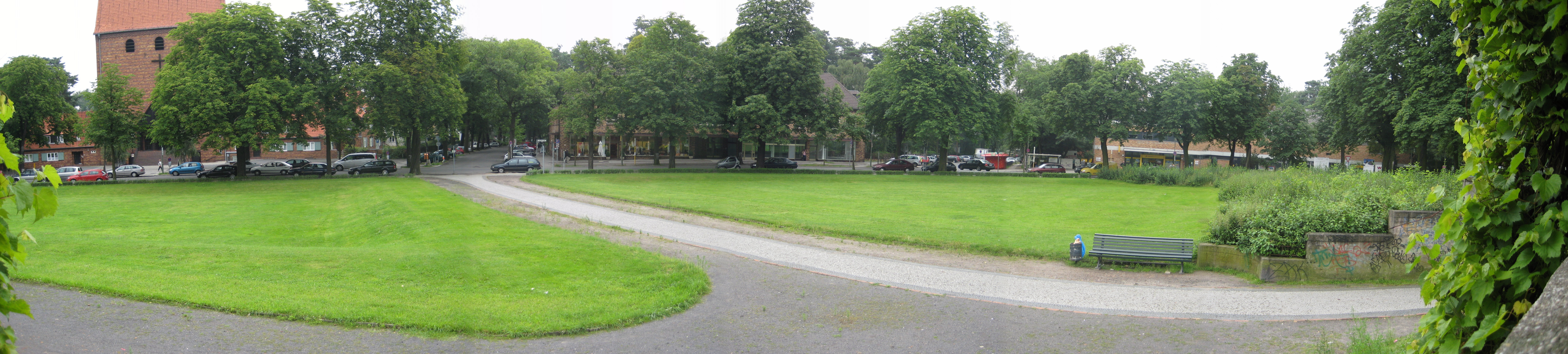
- Zeltinger Platz

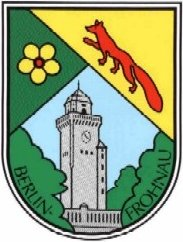
- Coat of arms

- Location of Frohnau in Reinickendorf district and Berlin
- Interactive map of Frohnau
- Location within Germany Location within Berlin
- Coordinates: 52°38′00″N 13°18′00″E
- Country: Germany
- State: Berlin
- City: Berlin
- Borough: Reinickendorf
- Founded: 1910

Area
  - Total: 7.8 km^{2} (3.0 sq mi)
- Elevation: 52 m (171 ft)

Population (2024-12-31)
  - Total: 16,371
  - Density: 2,100/km^{2} (5,400/sq mi)
- Time zone: UTC+01:00 (CET)
  - Summer (DST): UTC+02:00 (CEST)
- Postal codes: 13465
- Vehicle registration: B

Frohnau (German pronunciation: [fʁoːˈnaʊ̯]) is a locality in the Reinickendorf borough of Berlin, Germany. It lies in the extreme northern part of the city. Frohnau is an affluent area characterized by many patrician villas from the early 20th century.

== History ==
Founded in 1910, Frohnau was created whole as a planned community, corresponding to the early twentieth-century idea of a garden city. Frohnau was founded in the Stolper Heath, which had been bought for the Berlin Terrain Commission by Count Guido Henckel von Donnersmarck in 1907. The competition for the design was won by a plan developed by Joseph Brix and Felix Genzmer. Their concept represented an asymmetrical, seemingly natural development out of the dunes near the Havel River. Even the name "Frohnau" was determined by a contest. In 1920, Frohnau was annexed into the Greater Berlin city-state. During World War II, in early 1945, a death march of prisoners of various nationalities from the dissolved camp in Żabikowo to the Sachsenhausen concentration camp passed through the neighborhood.

During the Cold War, it was part of West Berlin.

== Architectures ==
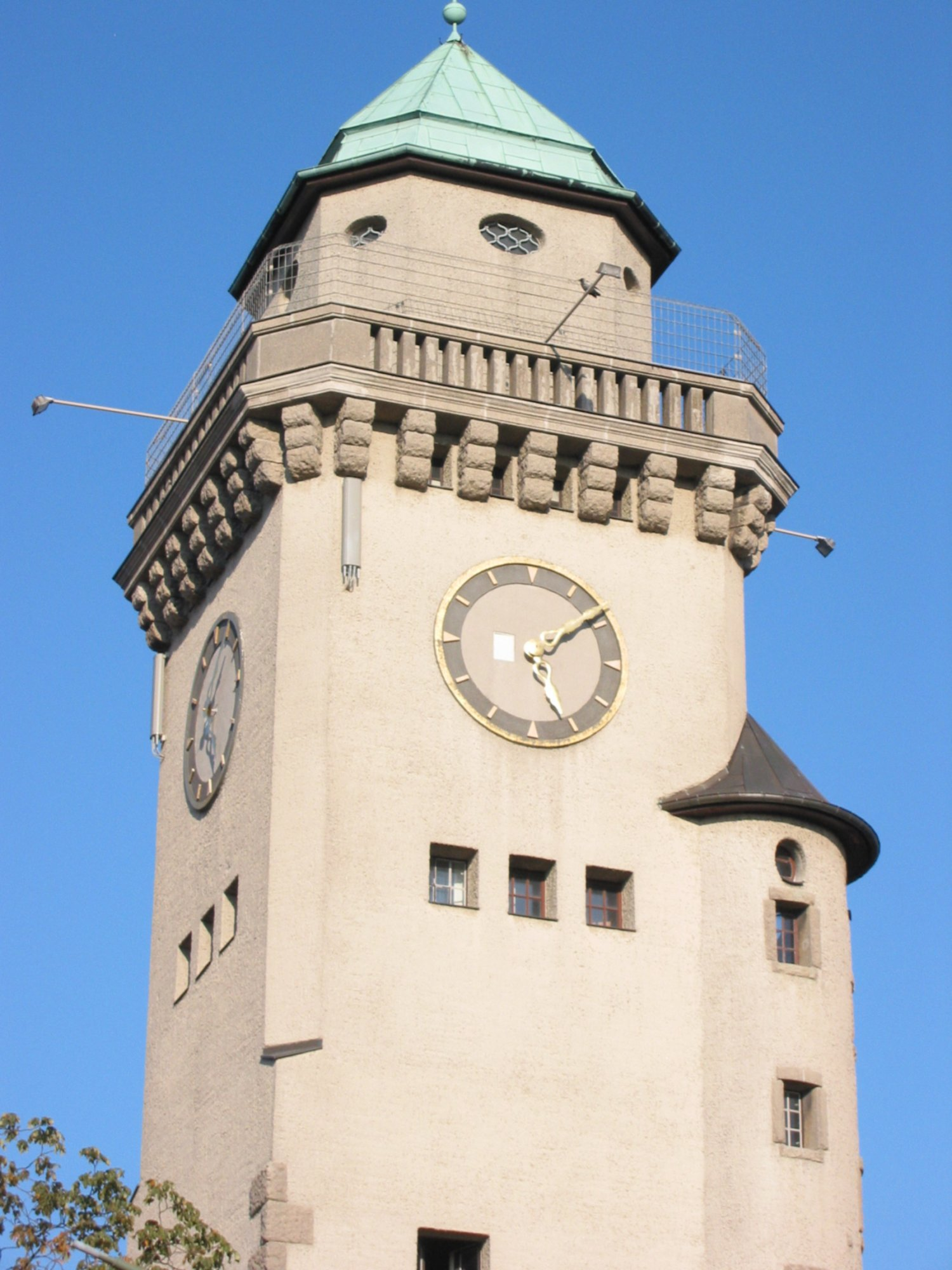
Casino Tower

The natural center of the city has always been the train station and the nearby buildings. The casino tower serves as the symbol of Frohnau. The entire area is noted for its large mansion-like buildings.

The architects responsible for the typical mansions include Walter and Johannes Krüger (the Church of St. John), Hart and Lesser (train station and casino tower), Max Meyer (Buddhist house), Paul Poser, Max Scheidling, and Heinrich Straumer (better known for his work on Berlin's radio tower, Funkturm).

Frohnau includes one of the tallest buildings in Germany: The Richtfunkmast (microwave radio tower) measures 358.6 m (1177 ft) in height and was built between 1977 and 1979. Until German reunification, this was the means for keeping microwave radio contact with West Germany. The receiving tower on the West German side was in Gartow, Lower Saxony. Alongside the Richtfunkmast is a 117 m (384 ft) free-standing steel framework tower, which is dwarfed in comparison. This was built between 1970 and 1973, and had 18 m (66 ft) diameter parabolic antennae to enable radio connection beyond the horizon to Lower Saxony until 1995. Since 2002 mediumwave digital radio transmissions have been tested in Frohnau at 1485 kHz. Since neither the Richtfunkmast nor the parabolic antenna tower was intended for mediumwave transmissions, an additional 10 m (33 ft) long-wire antenna was installed.
