= Kollhoff-Tower =

5th tallest building in Berlin

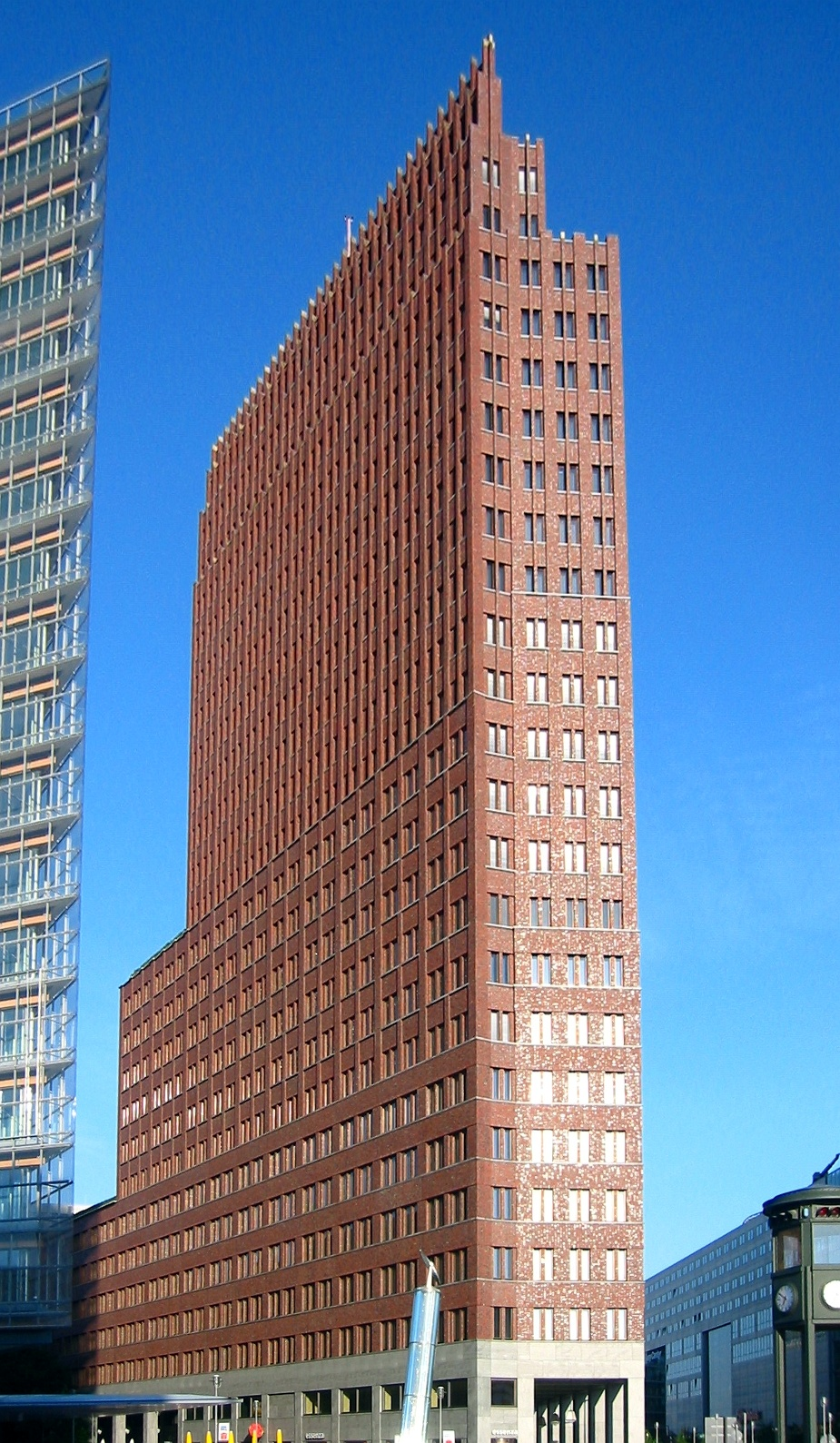
- Kollhoff-Tower at Potsdamer Platz
- Interactive map of the Kollhoff-Tower area

General information
- Location: Potsdamer Platz, Berlin, Germany
- Coordinates: 52.508889°N 13.375°E
- Construction started: 1995
- Completed: 1999
- Owner: Brookfield Property Partners

Height
- Antenna spire: 115 m (377 ft)
- Roof: 103 m (338 ft)

Technical details
- Floor count: 25
- Floor area: 31,700 m^{2}

Design and construction
- Architect: Hans Kollhoff

References
- Website

Kollhoff-Tower is a 25-story, 103 metres (338 ft) skyscraper on the Potsdamer Platz in Berlin, Germany. The building, named after Hans Kollhoff from Kollhoff und Timmermann Architekten, was completed in 1999 after four years of construction.

== Building ==
Together with the Bahntower 103 metres (338 ft) to the north and the Forum Tower designed by Renzo Piano (together with Atrium Tower and The Playce shopping center part of the debis complex) to the south, it forms a high-rise ensemble in the middle of the city. Kollhoff and Timmermann Architekten also designed the nearby Delbrück high-rise of the Beisheim Center. Both buildings are designed in the style of early 20th century high-rise architecture.

The lowest floors are intended for retail outlets, while the upper floors are reserved for offices. Since April 15, 2000, there has been a viewing platform on the top level, to which the fastest passenger elevator in Europe leads. It transports passengers at 8.65 m per second.

At the beginning of 2009, the building was scaffolded for façade repairs. Moisture penetrating the clinker façade can cause frost damage, which can lead to parts of the façade falling off. The sidewalk around the building was therefore covered with scaffolding in 2008 to protect passers-by. The viewing platform has been open to the public again since the beginning of June 2010.

Up there is the permanent exhibition "Berliner Blicke auf den Potsdamer Platz" about the history of Potsdamer Platz and a panorama café with glass on all sides.

== Gallery ==
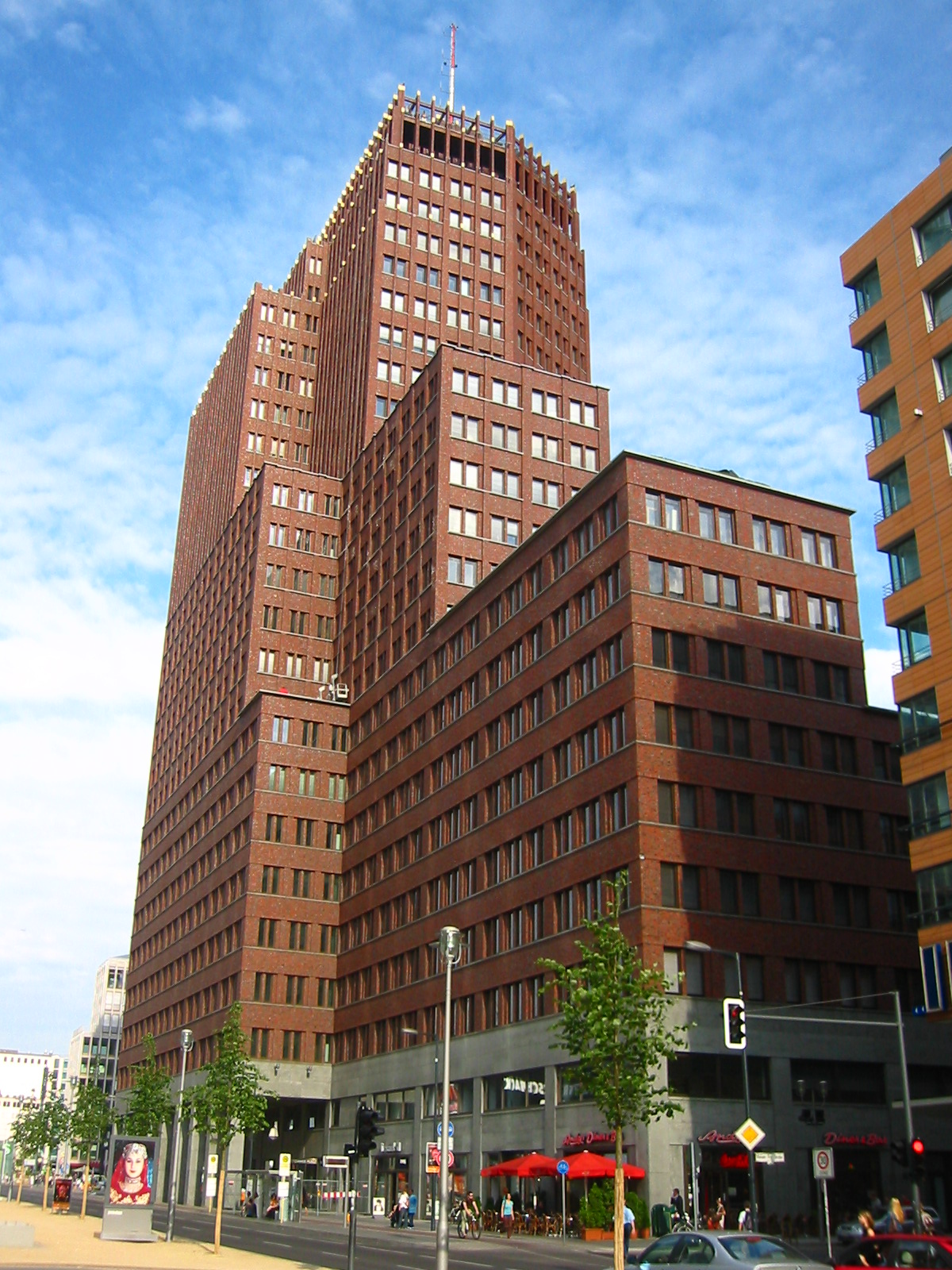

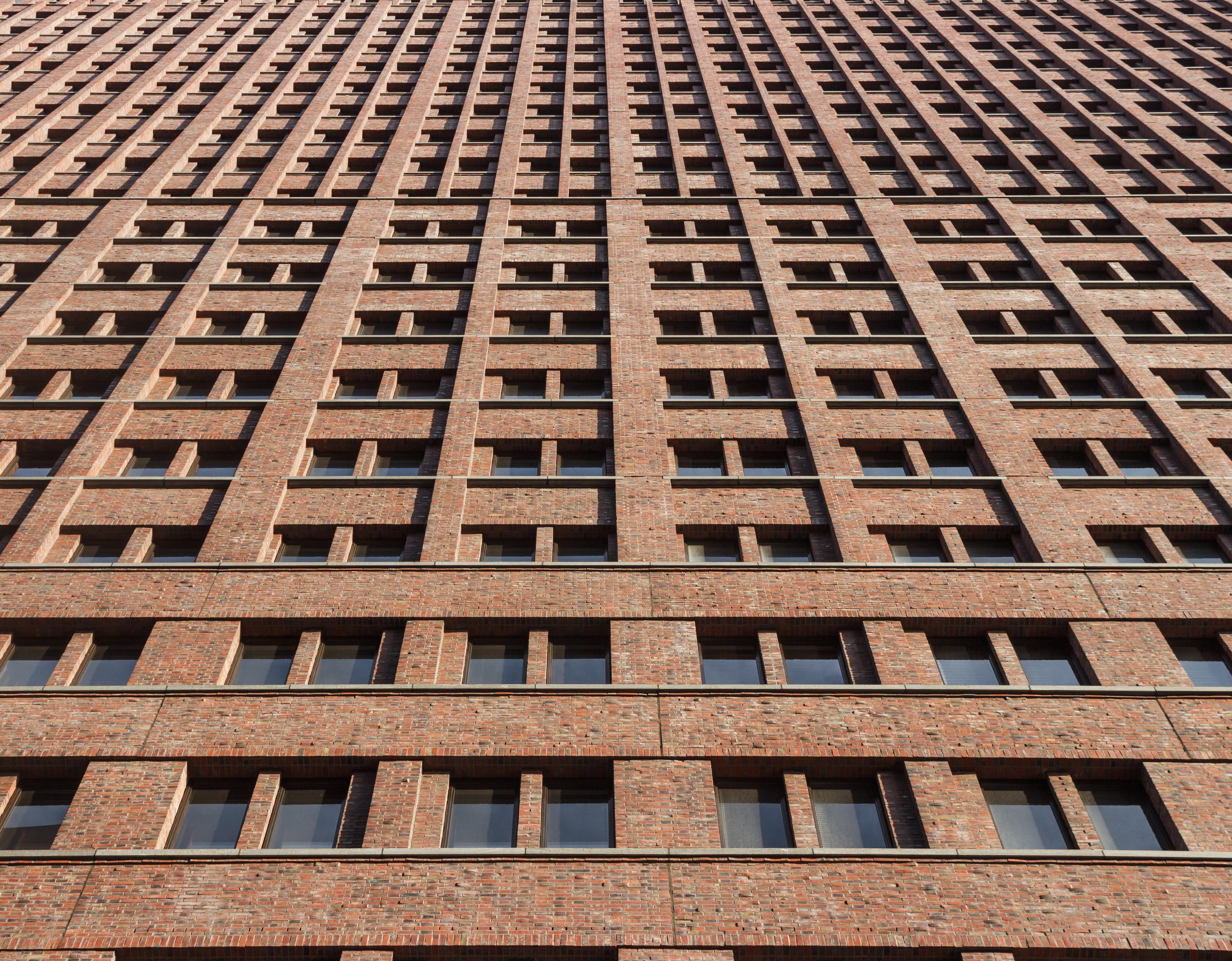

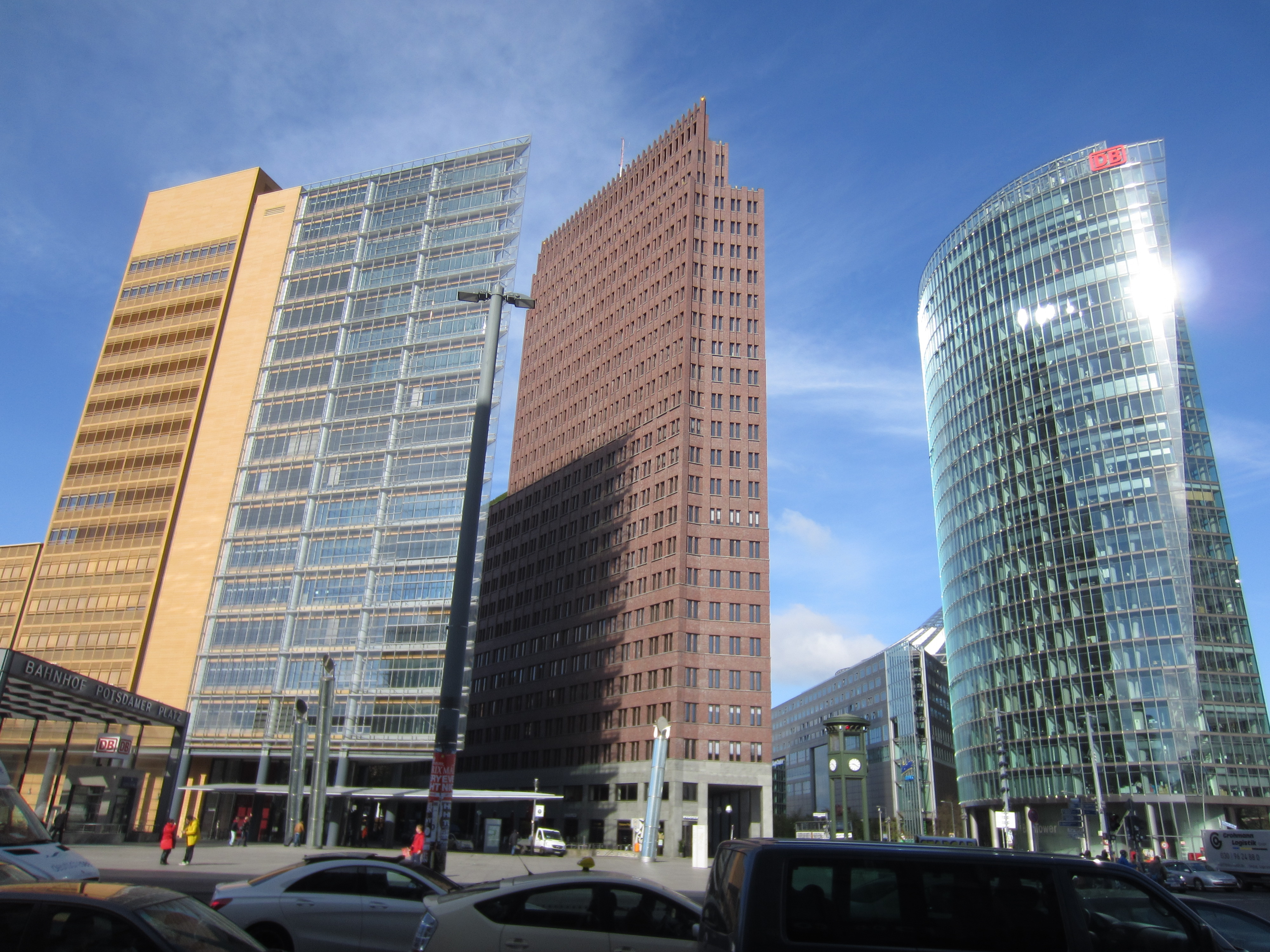

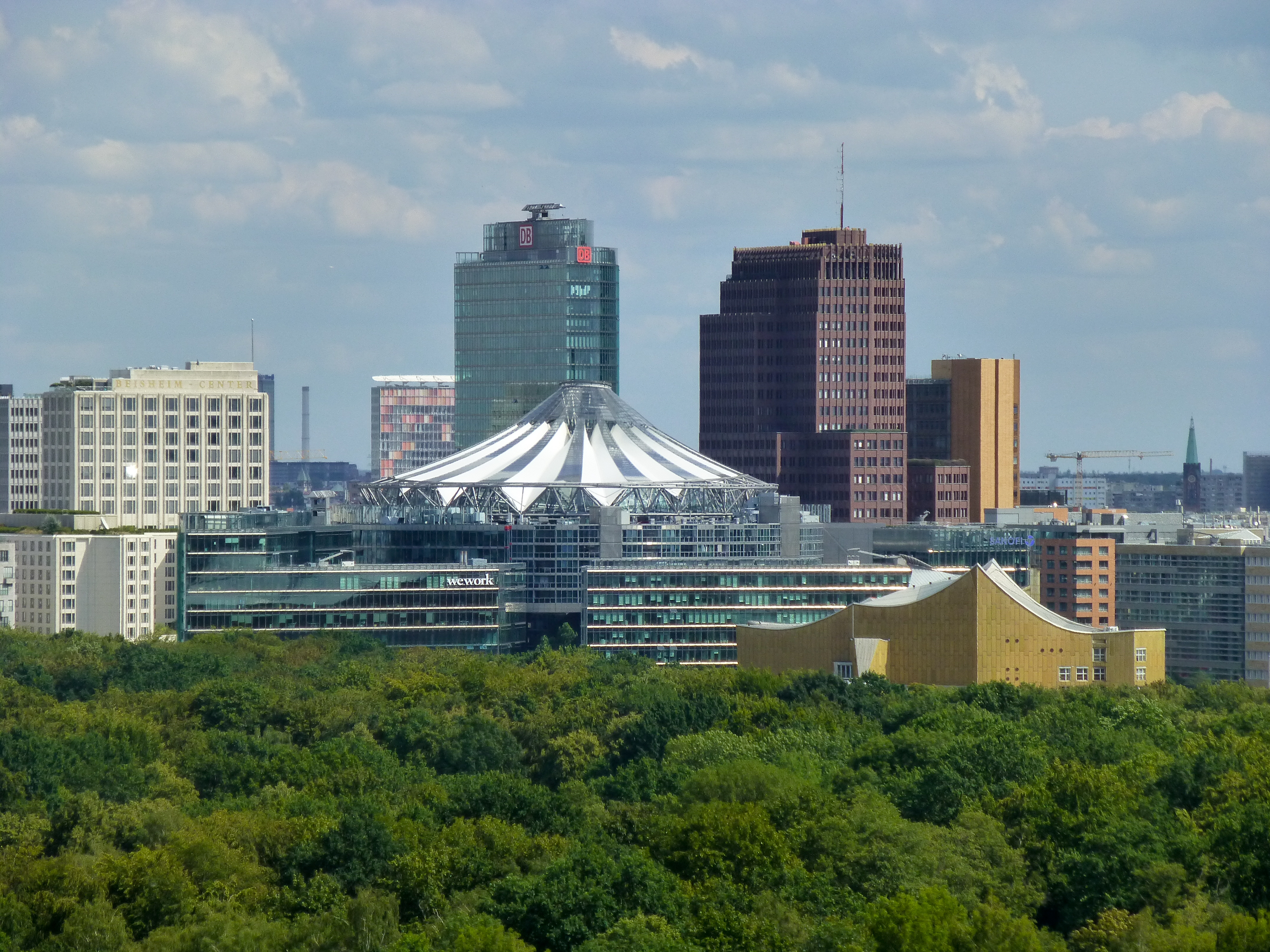

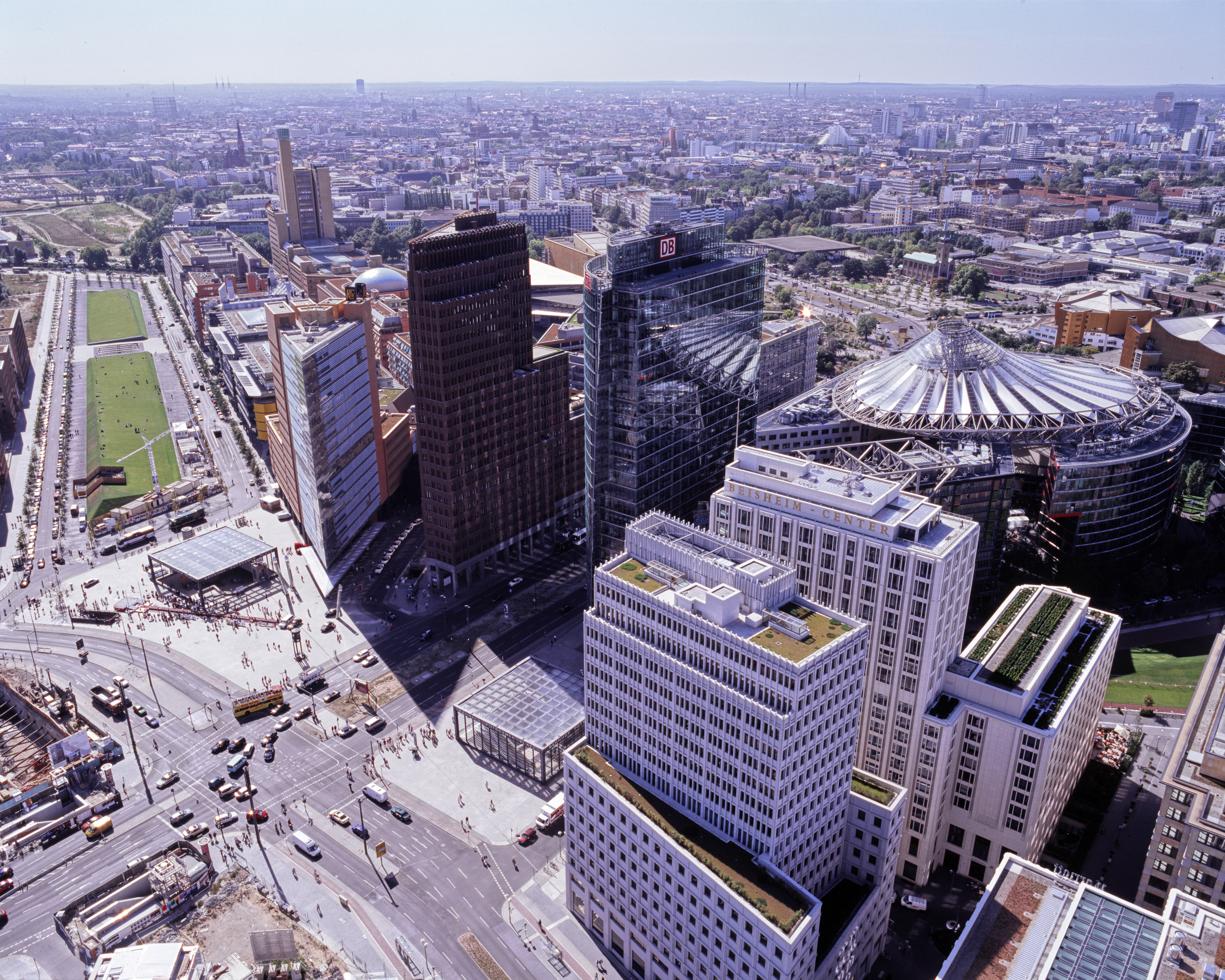

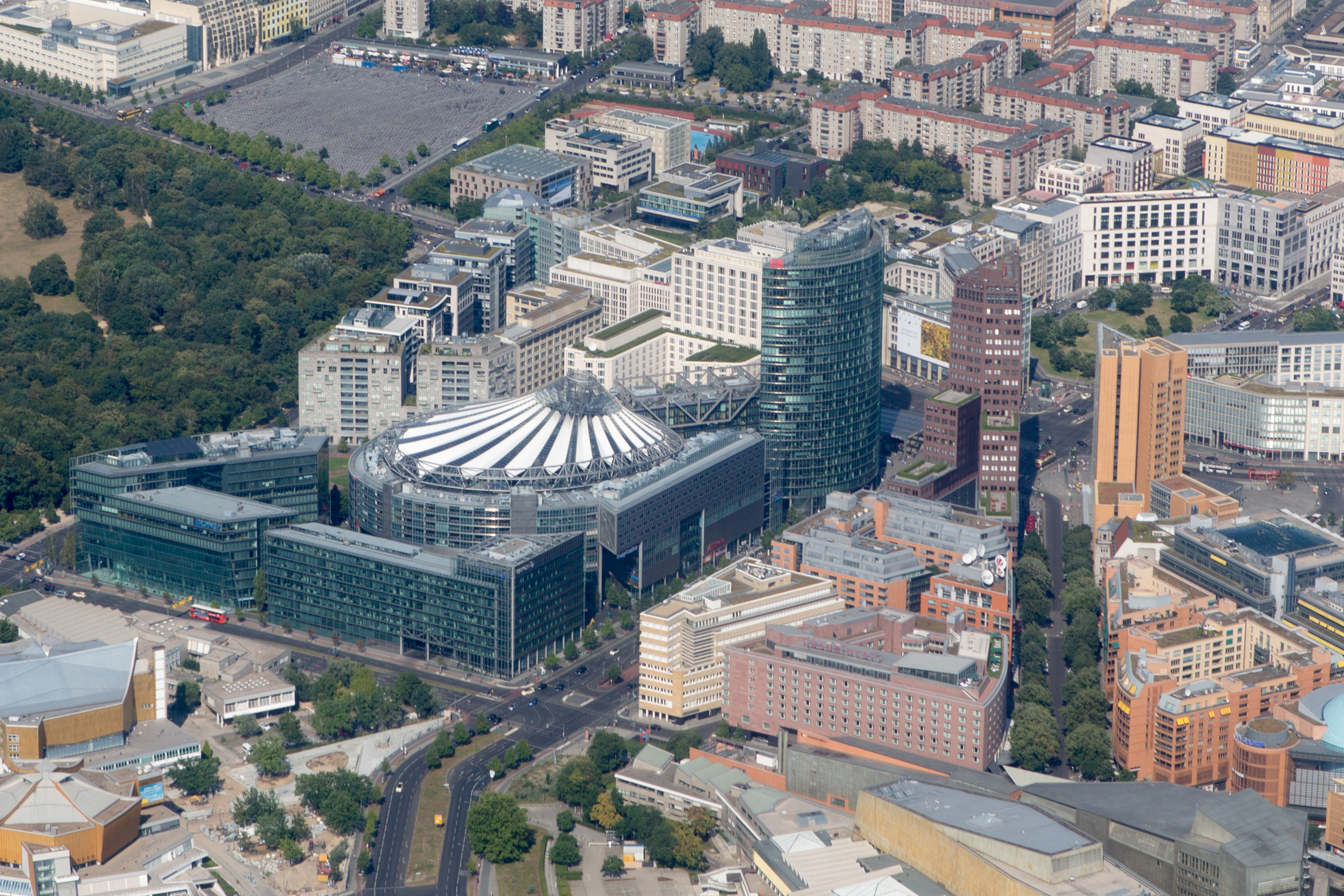

== See also ==
- List of tallest buildings in Berlin
