= Upper West (Berlin) =

5th tallest building in Berlin

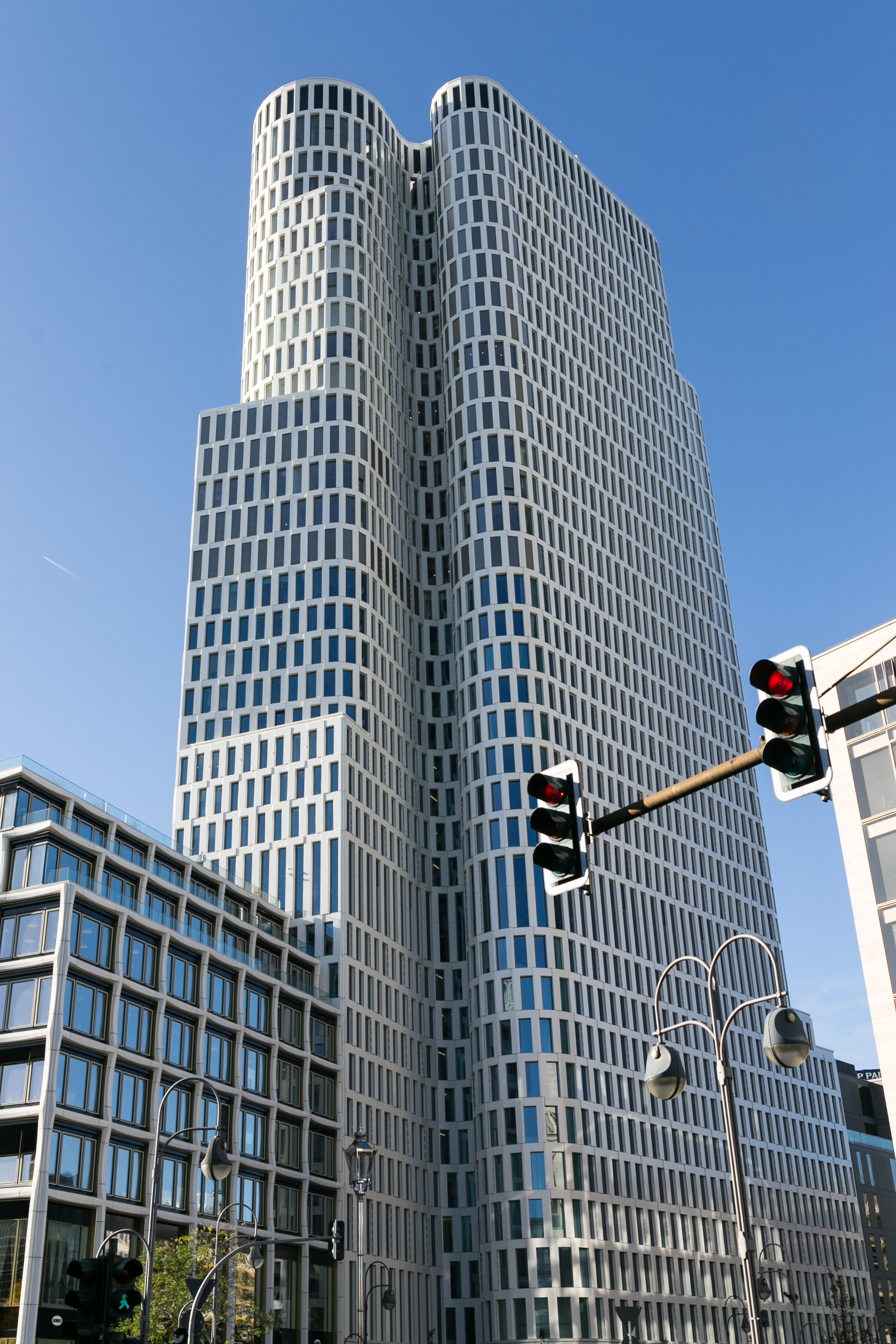
- Upper West Tower at Breitscheidplatz
- Interactive map of the Upper West area
- Hotel chain: Motel One

General information
- Location: Charlottenburg, Berlin, Germany
- Coordinates: 52.504966°N 13.332796°E
- Construction started: 2013
- Completed: March 2017
- Opening: 03.05.2017
- Owner: Signa Holding

Height
- Roof: 118.8 m (390 ft)

Technical details
- Floor count: 33

Design and construction
- Architects: Christoph Langhof; KSP Jürgen Engel Architekten

References
- Website

Upper West is a mixed-used skyscraper in Berlin, Germany. It is located at Breitscheidplatz in the City West area of Berlin, next to the high-rise Zoofenster. It opened on May 3, 2017, and was designed by Christoph Langhof and KSP Jürgen Engel Architekten (Berlin).

== Building ==
The Upper West is situated in the district of Charlottenburg in Berlin. It has 33 floors and a height of 118.8 metres (390 ft) and was constructed from spring 2013 to March 2017. The building is the 5th tallest building in Berlin after Edge East Side 142 metres (466 ft), Park Inn & Treptowers, both 125 metres (410 ft) and Steglitzer Kreisel, 120 metres (394 ft).

== Usage ==
The lower floors contain 3,900 m^{2} of retail space. The first 19 floors above are occupied by the Hotel chain Motel One with 582 rooms. The commercial law firm Görg, including an insolvency administrator, has leased floors 20–23 as well as partial areas on the 19th and 25th floors. A real estate company and an online marketing company moved in above the 25th floor. A Skybar was supposed to open on the 33rd floor, but this has not yet happened.

The developer, the US company RFR Holding, sold the high-rise in November 2017 to Signa Holding, the real estate and trading company founded by René Benko, whose Berlin office is located on the 31st and 32nd floors.

== See also ==
- List of tallest buildings in Berlin
