= Atrium Tower =

High-rise building in Berlin, Germany

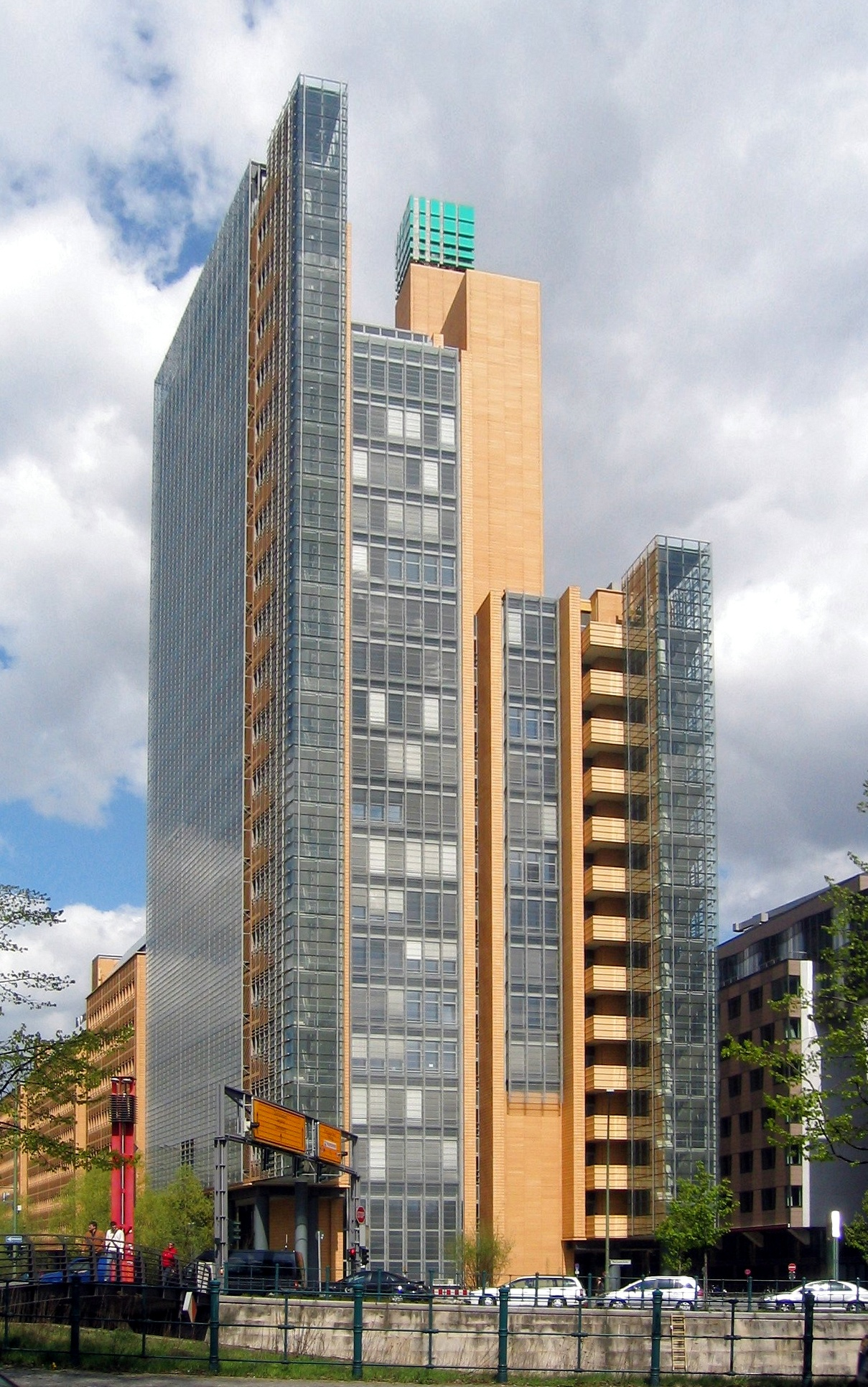
- Interactive map of the Atrium Tower area

General information
- Status: Completed
- Type: Office
- Architectural style: Postmodern
- Location: Berlin, Germany, 3 Eichhornstrasse, Berlin, Germany
- Coordinates: 52.50607°N 13.37297°E
- Construction started: 1993
- Completed: 1997
- Owner: Brookfield Property Partners

Height
- Roof: 106 m (348 ft)

Technical details
- Floor count: 22
- Floor area: 45,100 m^{2} (485,000 sq ft)

Design and construction
- Architects: Renzo Piano; Christoph Kohlbecker; Kohlbecker Architekten
- Developer: Daimler-Benz (former)
- Structural engineer: Boll & Partner Ingenieurgesellschaft; Schmidt Reuter Ingenieurgesellschaft (MEP)

The Atrium Tower (known as the Debis Tower (German: debis-Haus) until 2013) is a high-rise office building in the Tiergarten district of Berlin, Germany. Built between 1993 and 1997, the tower stands at 106 m (348 ft) tall and is the current 7th tallest building in Berlin.

== History ==
The tower was built between 1993 and 1997 by Daimler-Benz to a design by Renzo Piano as the headquarters of the Daimler-Benz service subsidiary debis and, together with other buildings built in a similar style, formed the so-called 'Daimler Quarter'. After the restructuring of the Daimler Group into Daimler AG (now Mercedes-Benz Group), the building served as the headquarters of Daimler Financial Services until 2013. After they moved out, the building was renamed Atrium Tower.

The building is located at the southern end of the former Daimler Quarter. It is easily accessible on foot from Potsdamer Platz. Its 82-metre-long floor plan, which tapers towards the south, takes up the motif of the acute angle that can be observed throughout the district. To the south it borders on the Landwehrkanal (Reichpietschufer). To the west it is bordered by the southern tunnel entrance of the Tiergarten Spreebogen Tunnel (TTS) with the federal highway 96, an artificial body of water and Marlene-Dietrich-Platz. The entrance in the north-eastern front opens onto Eichhornstrasse.

== Architecture ==
=== Concept ===
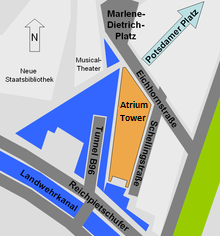
The tower's site plan

Architecturally, the Atrium Tower follows the master plan for the entire district, also created by Renzo Piano. What is particularly striking is the façade made of warm, natural-colored terracotta panels, which deliberately avoids cold-looking surfaces made of steel, glass or polished stone.

The building is divided into structures of different heights. The 106-meter-high tower, which is also a ventilation chimney for the Tiergarten Spreebogen tunnel, is visible from afar. Its top is still formed by the green debis logo, although the logo has not been used since the early 2000s. The second highest part of the building after the tower is a 23-story tower house, which forms the southern end of the building.

In the southeast of the building, the widely visible sculpture Landed by the Dutch artist Auke de Vries is attached to the roof. The work was completed in 2001 and visually resembles a cross, consisting of a mobile space capsule and a birdhouse.

The ecological idea characterizes the master plan for the district and especially the Atrium Tower. A combined heat and power plant supplies the buildings with heat and cooling. Parts of the facade are designed to allow natural ventilation of the rooms even in the event of large temperature fluctuations thanks to an unusual second outer skin made of glass with adjustable slats . The roof areas are largely greened and rainwater is collected in cisterns . It is used for flushing toilets and feeds the adjacent water surface.

=== The atrium ===
The northern, flatter part of the building encloses a large atrium with a glass roof. Inside is the light installation Light Blue by François Morellet. Originally intended as a transition between the public and private areas, the atrium has not been open to the public since the attacks of September 11, 2001.

=== Development ===
The development of the building is closely linked to that of the Daimler Quartier.

- In 1989, before the fall of the Berlin Wall, the then Daimler-Benz boss Edzard Reuter began negotiations with the Berlin Senate about purchasing the unused site at Potsdamer Platz.
- The purchasing of the building's site plot took place in the summer of 1990.
- In 1991, the Berlin Senate announced an international urban planning competition for the entire Potsdamer Platz and Leipziger Platz areas.
- In 1992, the architects Heinz Hilmer and Christoph Sattler won the competition.
- Also in 1992, Daimler-Benz AG announced an architectural competition for its site, which Renzo Piano and Christoph Kohlbecker won in the same year. They then developed the so-called "master plan" based on the winning design.
- The groundbreaking ceremony of the building's site took place in 1993.
- On October 24, 1997, the building was the first of the entire area to be inaugurated. It was considered a showcase project for debis real estate management. Edzard Reuter, the initiator of the entire project who has since been replaced by Jürgen Schrempp as chairman of the Board of Management of Daimler-Benz AG, did not attend the inauguration ceremony.
- In 2007, Daimler sold the entire Daimler-Benz site, including the debis building, to SEB Asset Management (a subsidiary of the Swedish bank SEB), which acquired it in 2008 for the public fund SEB ImmoInvest.
- By September 2013, the 1200 employees of the Mercedes sales department had moved out.
- In 2015, the site was sold for around 1.4 billion euros to the Canadian real estate investor Brookfield Property Partners, which has owned the Atrium Tower ever since.
- The news channel WeLT (until 2018: N24) has been broadcasting from the building since autumn 2008. The news channel, which belongs to N24 Media GmbH, has set up a newsroom, control rooms as well as moderation and talk show areas on a total of five floors with around 7400 m^{2}. Around 250 employees work in the studio and editorial rooms. The news channel left the building in 2021 and moved to the new Axel Springer building.

== Gallery ==
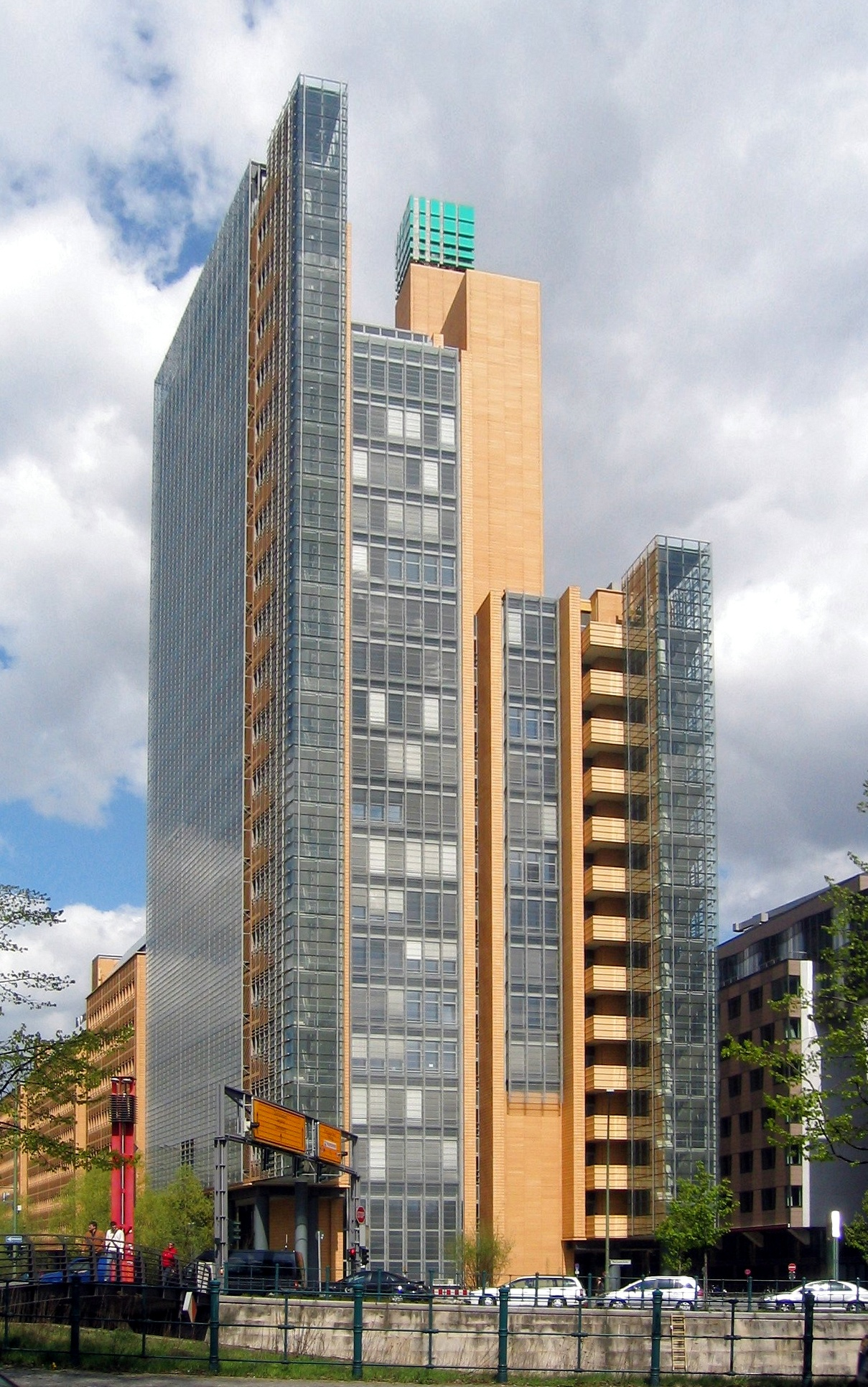
View of the south side of the Landwehrkanal...

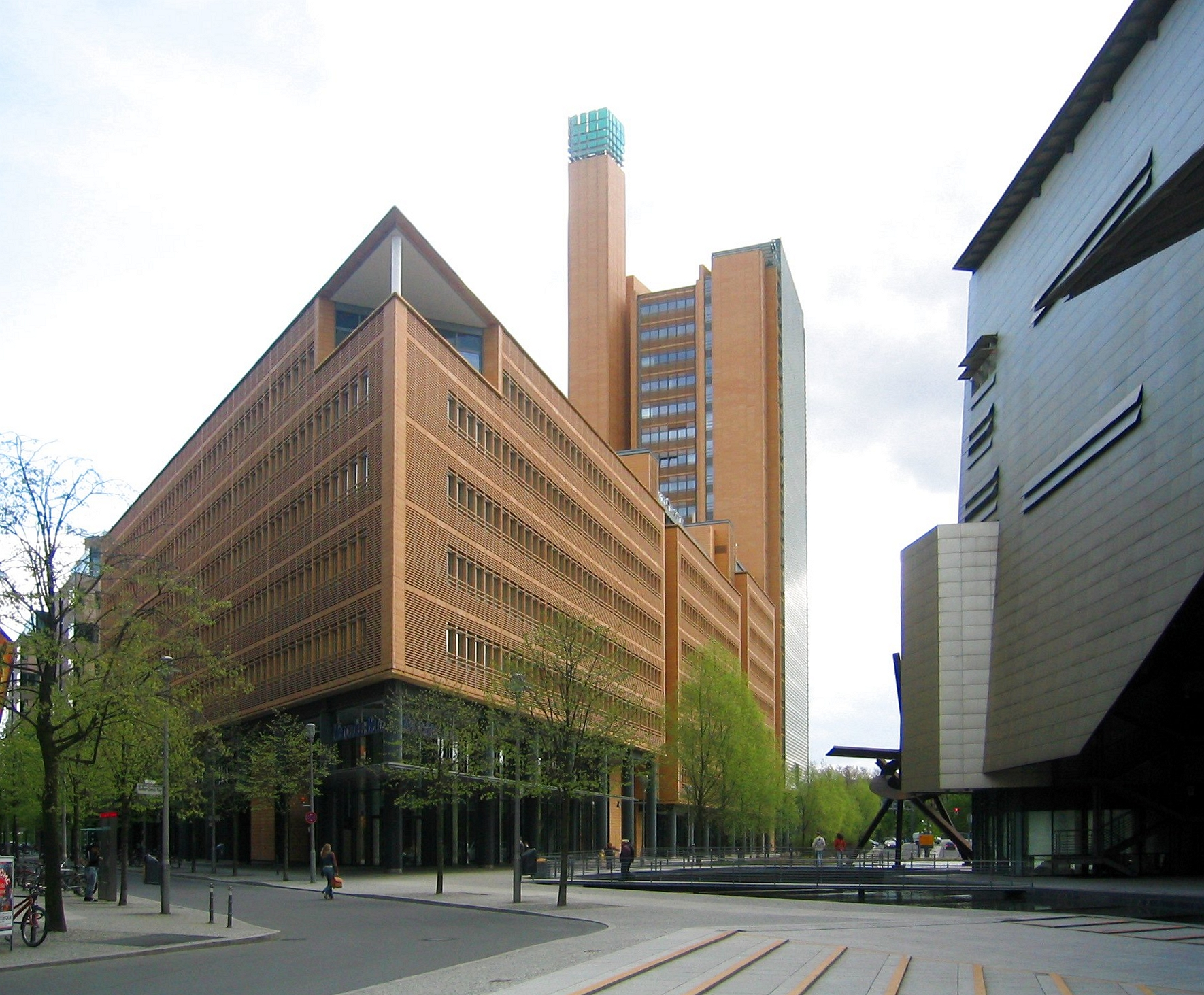
...and from Marlene-Dietrich-Platz

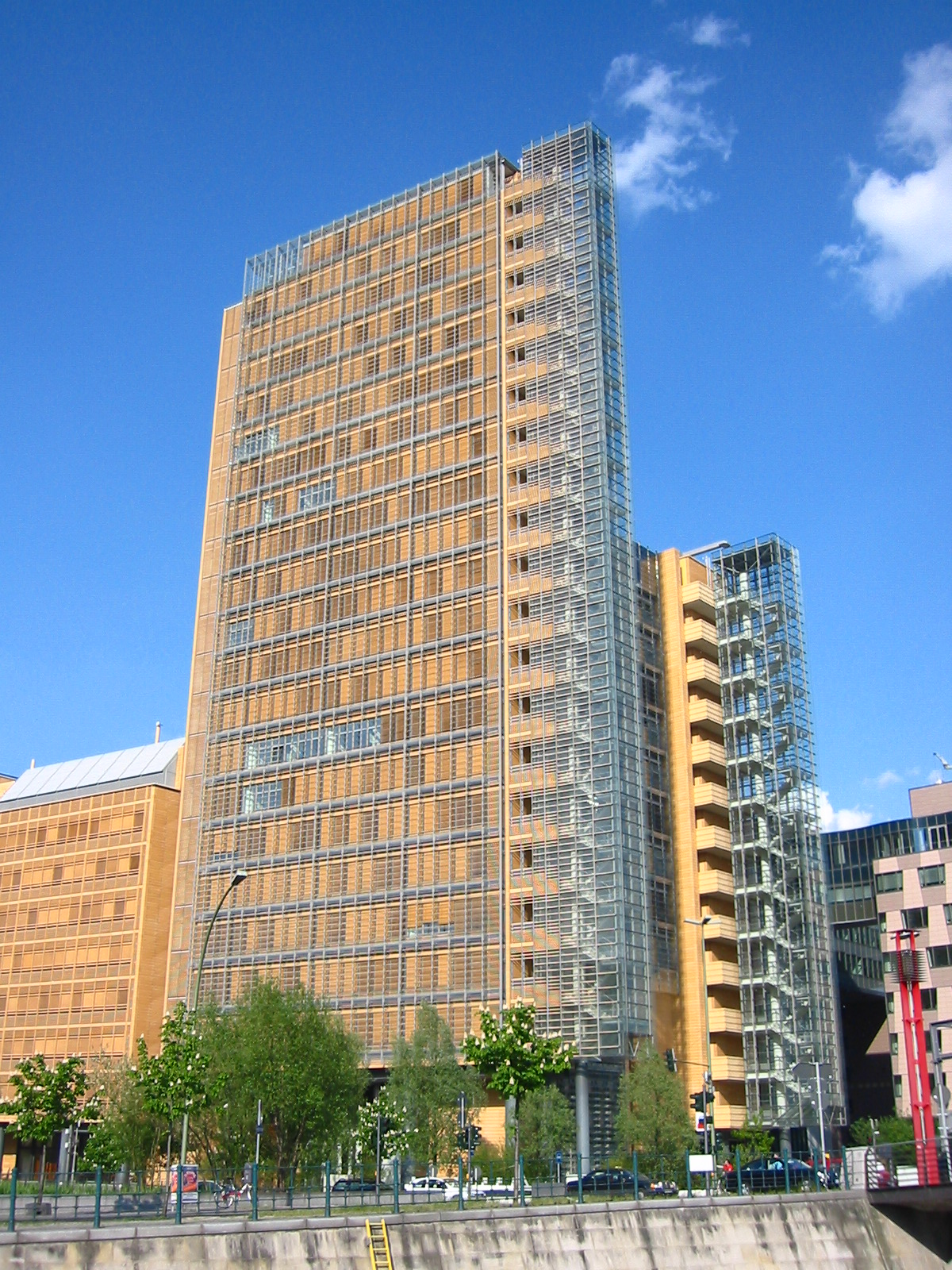
View of the southwest facade

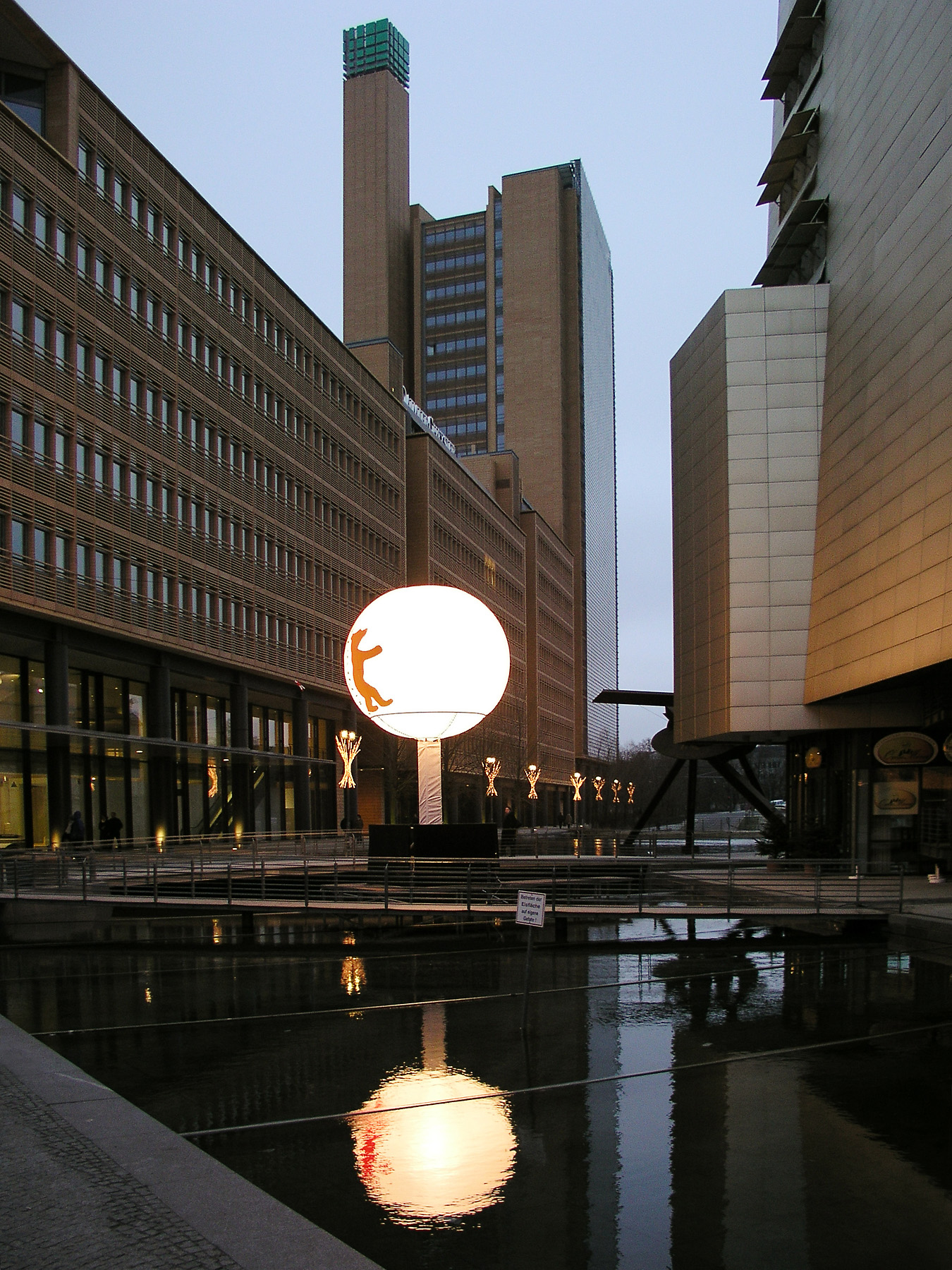
Dusk at the Atrium Tower

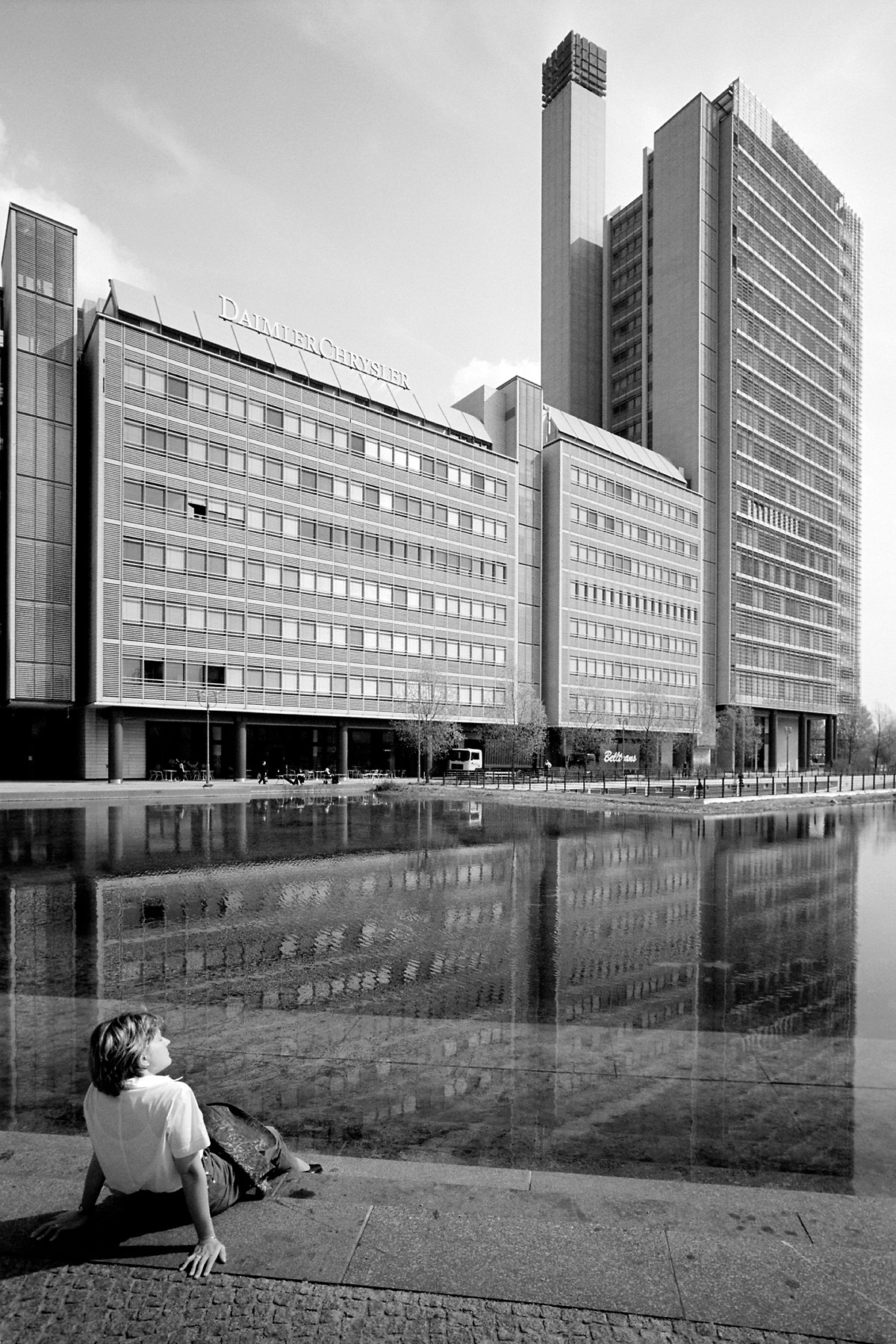
The Atrium Tower with the pond

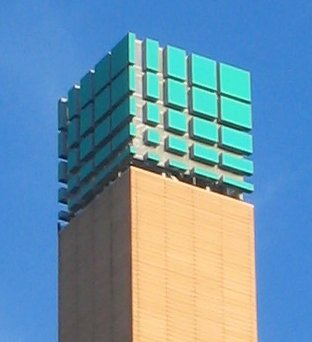
View of the old debis logo on the house

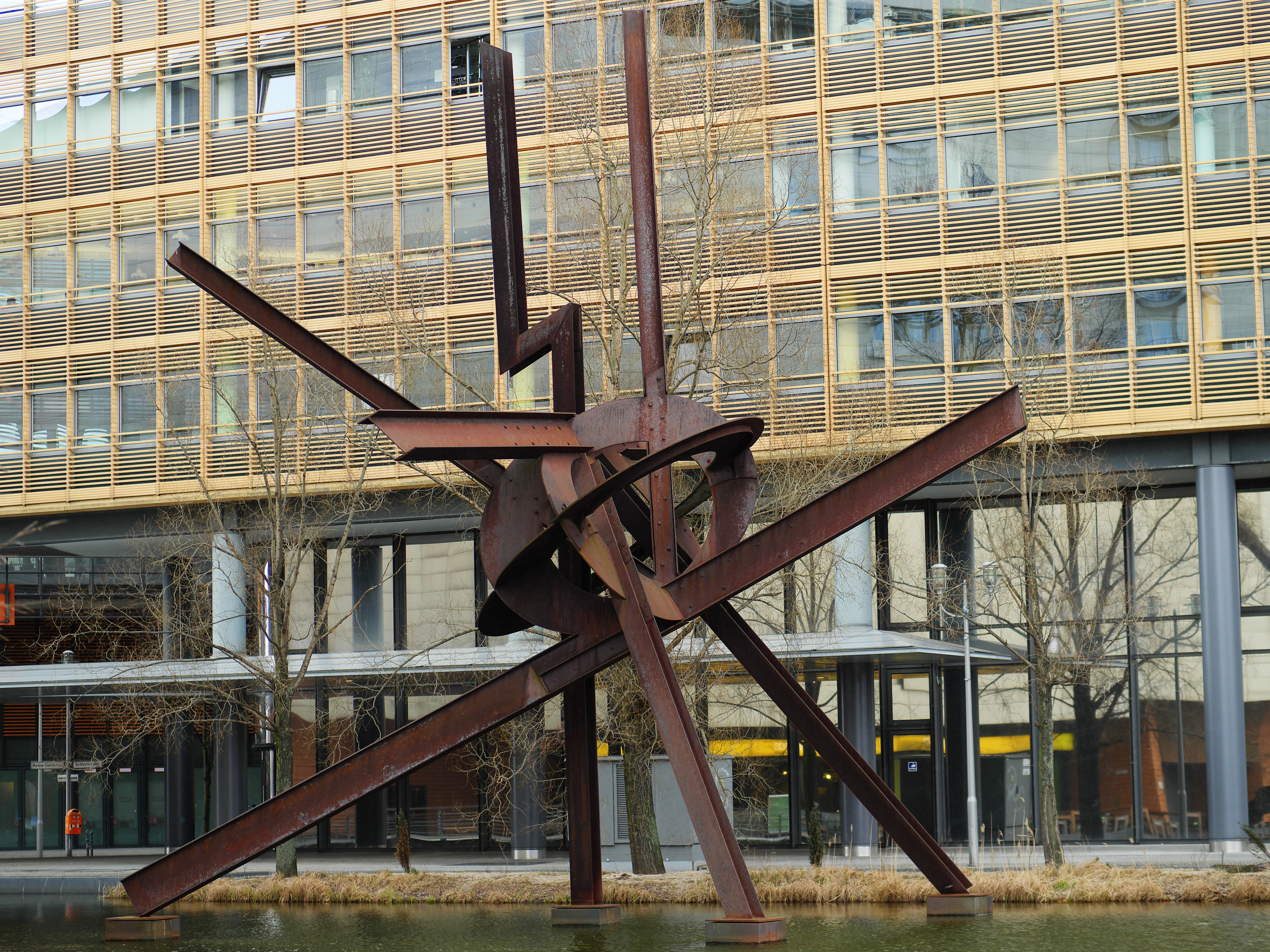
Sculpture of Galileo by Mark di Suvero on the Piano Lake at the Atrium Tower

== See also ==
- List of tallest buildings in Berlin
- List of tallest buildings in Germany
