= Kudamm Karree =

High-rise building in Berlin, Germany

- Ku’damm-Karree-Hochhaus (German)
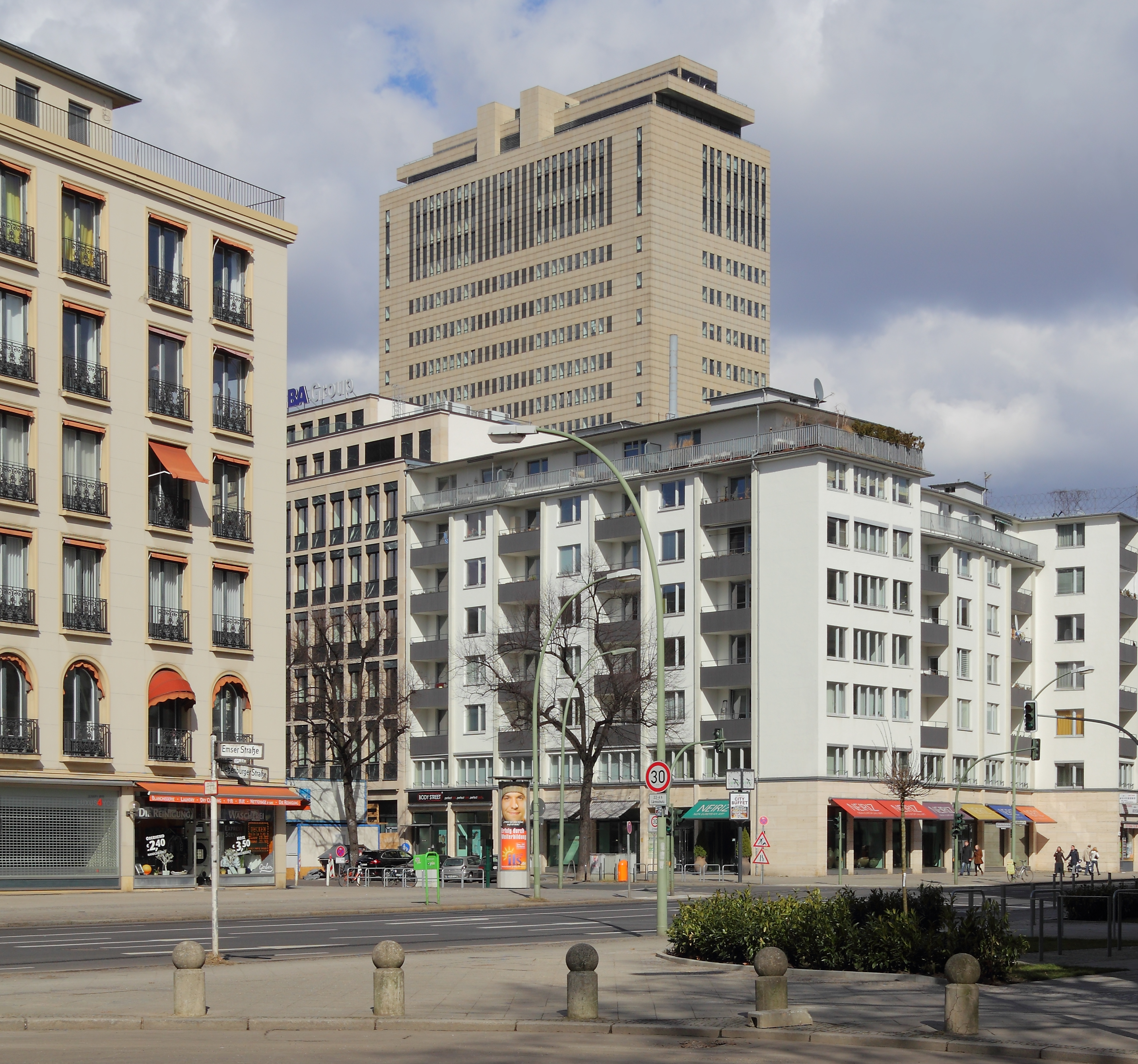
- The Kudamm Karee in April 2013 before final renovations
- Interactive map of the Kudamm Karree area

General information
- Status: Completed
- Type: Office
- Location: Berlin, Germany, 207/208 Kurfürstendamm, Berlin, Germany
- Coordinates: 52.50072°N 13.32315°E
- Construction started: 1969
- Completed: 1974
- Owner: Cells Bauwelt GmbH & Mikhail Opengeym

Height
- Roof: 102 m (335 ft)

Technical details
- Structural system: Concrete
- Floor count: 23
- Floor area: 23,000 m^{2} (248,000 sq ft)

Design and construction
- Architect: Sigrid Kressmann-Zschach

Kudamm Karree (German: Ku’damm-Karree-Hochhaus) is a high-rise office building in the Charlottenburg district of Berlin, Germany. Built between 1969 and 1974, the tower stands at 102 m (335 ft) tall with 23 floors and is the current 14th tallest building in Berlin.

== History ==
The core building with 33 floors was built between 1969 and 1974 and is located in the center of the building block, which is bordered by the Kurfürstendamm, Uhlandstraße, Lietzenburger Straße and Knesebeckstraße streets. The 102 m high building was designed by the German architect Sigrid Kressmann-Zschach. The total area of the building is of 23,000 m^{2} (248,000 sq ft).

Between 1994 and 1995, the building was renovated and was given a new facade. The real estate entrepreneur Rafael Roth acquired the building from the state of Berlin in 1990 and renovated the high-rise edifice. He had owned a penthouse apartment in the building until his death in 2013. The Kudamm-Karree multi-purpose facility (bunker facility) is located in the second basement of the underground car park. Since 2018, the building ensemble has been undergoing fundamental renovation and will in future be called Fürst.

== Particularities ==
=== Ownership ===
In 2002, Rafael Roth resold the high-rise to the company db-Real-Estate. Four years later in 2006, the latter company sold the Ku'damm-Karree to Fortress, a private equity fund.

After further sales, the building came into the possession of Ballymore Properties in 2008. Ballymore planned the redesign of the Ku'damm-Karree; the high-rise was to be equipped with residential units and given a new facade. The designs for the conversion were drawn up by the British architect David Chipperfield.

At the beginning of 2015, Cells Bauwelt GmbH from Munich became the new owner, which, with the help of private investors, is implementing further renovation plans for the complex, including the theater and the comedy theater on Kurfürstendamm. With Ionview Holdings (Sàrl), Luxembourg, a subsidiary of the Dayan Family Office of the Israeli investor Amir Dayan, the Fürst has had a new owner since October 2019. The Russian businessman Mikhail Opengeym has sold all of his shares. Cells Bauwelt remained the sole developer.

=== Construction and renovations ===
The project is financed by a banking consortium led by the Bayerische Landesbank. For several years, nothing happened on the buildings because public protests prevented the implementation of the rigorous new construction and redesign plans. In particular, the preservation of the two theaters, which according to initial plans were to be demolished in favor of retail facilities, was at stake.

Finally, in May 2018, the first building demolition work took place on the square to make way for a new building, but the high-rise building will remain. After legal wrangling and the Berlin Senate's promise to provide a grant of 800,000 euros for the renovation of the theaters, the project developer Cells Bauwelt changed its plans: after the reopening of the Ku'damm square, the theaters can now move into new theater rooms in the basement, where a modern theater hall with 640 seats will be built, the rental contract of which is guaranteed for 20 years. In the summer of 2018, they were given an alternative venue in the Schiller Theater.

The first construction phase on Uhlandstraße was scheduled to be completed by the end of 2019. All office and commercial space has already been leased, including to Rent 24 Co-Working, RTL Audio Center and Rewe (as of February 2019).

The second construction phase involves the redesign of the building. The interior is to be renovated and modernized, and the facade of the lower parts is to be "torn open" to make the tower structure more visible. At street level, a small town square is to be created in the gap created between the buildings, on which the separate entrance building for the theater stages is to be built in the form of a glass pavilion.

A notable concession to the Senate's plans to make Berlin more bicycle-friendly is the conversion of the first basement floor into a storage area for up to 1,000 bicycles. The former nuclear fallout shelter on the second basement floor can be visited with the history exhibition The Story of Berlin.

The second construction phase also includes new buildings for the block. These will include offices, a hotel, restaurants, retail, cultural, sports and fitness facilities. The total commercial area is estimated at 97,000 m². The project developer has stated that the completion date is early 2024.

The separate car park was modernised and given a newly adapted facade.

== See also ==
- List of tallest buildings in Berlin
- List of tallest buildings in Germany
