= List of tallest buildings in Berlin =

Tall buildings in Berlin
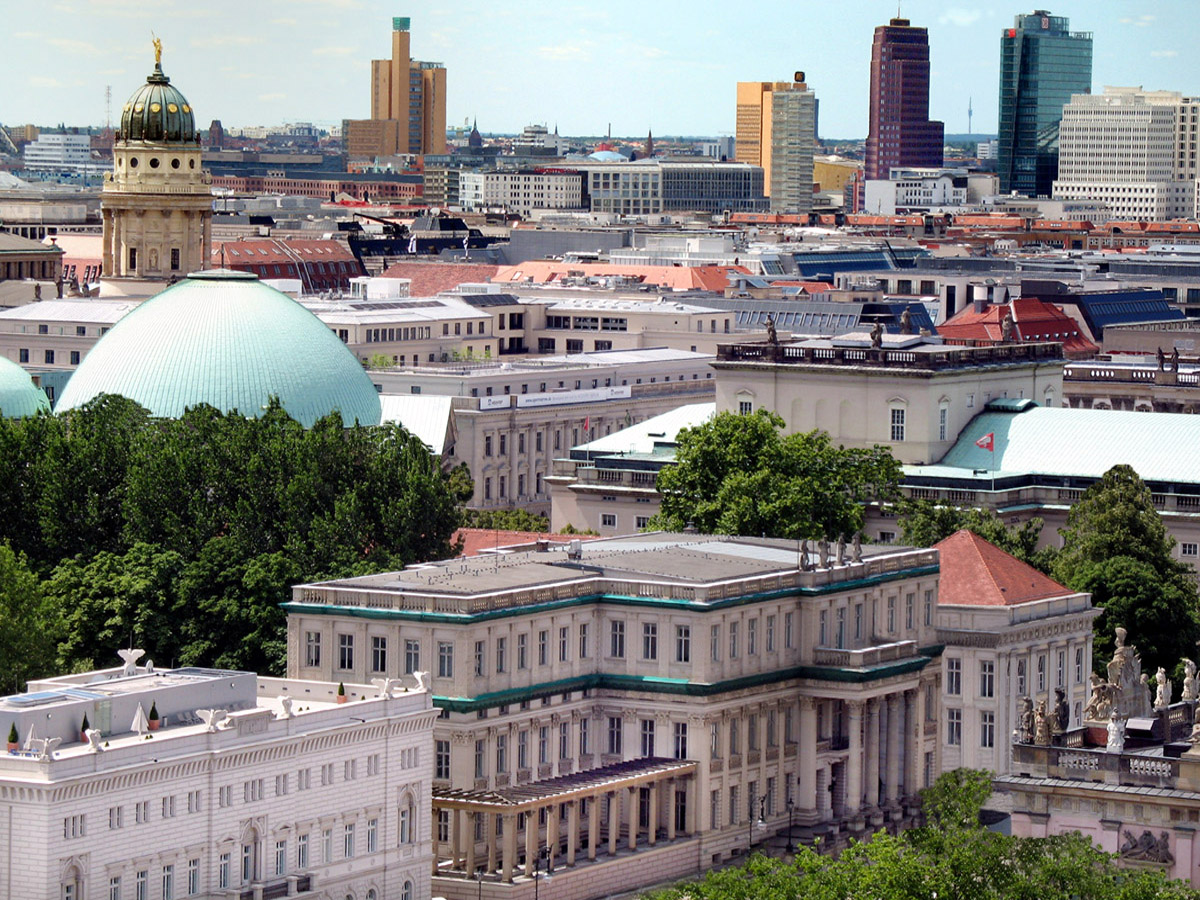
- View from Unter den Linden to Potsdamer Platz
- Tallest building: Estrel Tower (2025)
- Tallest building height: 176 m (577 ft)
- Tallest structure: Fernsehturm Berlin (1969)
- Tallest structure height: 368 m (1,207 ft)
- First 150 m+ building: Estrel Tower (2025)

Number of tall buildings
- Taller than 100 m (328 ft): 14 (2025)
- Taller than 150 m (492 ft): 1

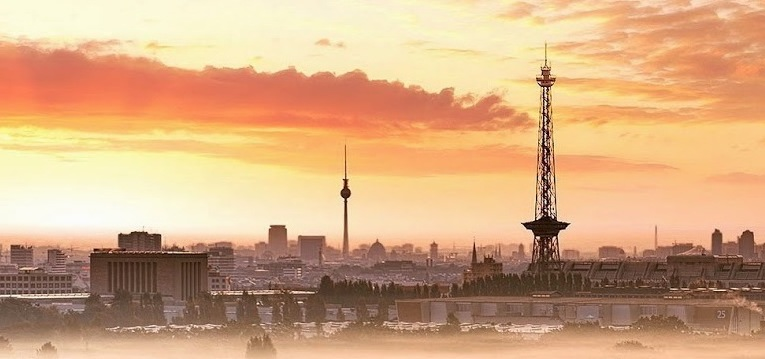
Skyline of Berlin

This list of tallest buildings in Berlin ranks skyscrapers, high-rises, and free-standing structures in the German capital of Berlin by height. The tallest structure in Berlin is the Fernsehturm Berlin, which rises 368 metres (1,207 ft), while the tallest skyscraper is the Estrel Tower, which rises 176 metres (577 ft), having been topped out in 2025. Although Berlin is the capital and largest city of Germany, it has relatively few tall buildings compared to the financial centre of the country, Frankfurt.

A cluster of office high rise buildings is located at Potsdamer Platz in the Mitte district and at Breitscheidplatz in the Charlottenburg-Wilmersdorf district. High rises and skyscrapers are under construction at the Alexanderplatz in the Mitte district. Two skyscrapers are also under construction in Charlottenburg and Neukölln.

Among the early skyscrapers were the Narva-Turm (1909), Behrensbau (1917), Siemensturm (1918), Borsigturm (1925) and Ullsteinhaus (1927). The 77 m (253 ft) tall Ullsteinhaus was Germany's tallest high-rise building before World War II.

Due to increasing population, tourism and commercial activities, the construction of residential, hotel and office high-rises has increased Berlin after the year 2000.

== Tallest buildings and structures ==
- The list includes existing free standing structures and buildings (above 65 m (213 ft)) in the city of Berlin as of 2024.
- This list includes steeples up to a height of 75 meters.
- The list does not include the mast radiator Sender Scholzplatz (230 metres) and the Richtfunkstelle Berlin-Frohnau (117 metres).
- The list does not include monuments like the Berlin Victory Column (67 metres).

Rank	Name	Image	Height m (ft)	Year	Use / Note
-	Berliner Fernsehturm		368 m (1,207 ft)	1965–1969	Television tower, restaurant Tallest structure in Germany since 1969/1990; Second tallest structure in the European Union; Fourth tallest free standing structure in Europe since 1987; Third tallest free standing structure in the world from 1969 to 1973
-	Fernmeldeturm Berlin		212 m (696 ft)	1961–1964	Radio tower Tallest structure in West Berlin from 1964 to 1990
1	Estrel Tower		176 m (577 ft)	2021-2025	Office and Hotel tower Tallest Skyscraper in Berlin Since 2024
-	Berliner Funkturm		146.8 m (482 ft)	1924–1926	Radio tower Tallest structure in Berlin from 1926 to 1933
2	The Berlinian		146 m (479 ft)	2021-2027	Topped out. Originally started by Signa, now being built by Commerz Real. Tallest high rise at the Alexanderplatz.
3	Edge East Side Tower		142 m (466 ft)	2019–2023	Main tenant is Amazon; Tallest high rise in Berlin from 2023-2024
=4	Park Inn by Radisson Berlin Alexanderplatz		125 m (410 ft)	1967–1969	Hotel; Tallest high-rise in Berlin from 1969-2023; Tallest hotel in Eastern Germany from 1969 to 1990; Second tallest hotel in Germany since 1990
=4	Treptowers		125 m (410 ft)	1995–1998	Office; Tallest office building in Berlin from 1998-2023
6	Steglitzer Kreisel		120 m (394 ft)	1968–1980	Residential (Currently undergoing restructuring)
=7	Upper West		119 m (390 ft)	2013–2016	Hotel
=7	Zoofenster		119 m (390 ft)	2008–2012	Hotel
9	Atrium Tower		106 m (348 ft)	1993–1997	Office
=10	Europa-Center		103 m (338 ft)	1963–1965	Office, Residential; Tallest high-rise in Berlin in 1965
=10	Bahntower		103 m (338 ft)	1998–2000	Office
=10	Kollhoff-Tower		103 m (338 ft)	1998–1999	Office
13	Kudamm Karree		102 m (335 ft)	1974	Residential (Currently: Conversion to Fürst Tower and adding floors)
=14	Die Pyramide		100 m (328 ft)	1994–1995	Office
=14	BfA-Hochhaus		100 m (328 ft)	1976	Office
	Berliner Dom		98 m (322 ft)	1894–1905	Religion; Former height 116 meters
16	Stream Tower		97.5 m (320 ft)	2019–2021	Office
17	Internationales Handelszentrum		93 m (305 ft)	1976–1978	Office
18	Wohnhochhaus Ideal		90 m (295 ft)	1968–1969	Residential; Tallest residential building in Berlin since 1969
19	Postbank-Hochhaus		89 m (292 ft)	1965–1971	Residential (Currently undergoing restructuring)
	St. Mary's Church		89.7 m (294 ft)	1270, 1789	Religion
	Kirche am Südstern		89 m (292 ft)	1894–1897	Religion
	Lutherkirche		88 m (289 ft)	1891–1894	Lutheran Church
	Charlottenburg Town Hall		87.5 m (287 ft)	1899–1905	Borough town hall
	Heilandskirche		87 m (285 ft)	1894	Religion
	St. Sebastian		87 m (285 ft)	1893	Religion
	Apostel-Paulus-Kirche		85 m (279 ft)	1894	Religion
	St. Nicholas Church		84 m (276 ft)	1470	Religion
20	Hochhaus am Europaplatz		84 m (276 ft)	2023	Office
21	Wohnhochhaus; Zwickauer Straße		84 m (276 ft)	1969	Residential
22	Waldsassener Straße 29		84 m (276 ft)	1969	Residential
=23	GSW-Hochhaus		82 m (269 ft)	1999	Office
=23	Upbeat		82 m (269 ft)	2025	Office
=23	Charité main hospital		82 m (269 ft)	1977–1982	Hospital building
	Zwinglikirche		81 m (266 ft)	1908	Relilgion
	Altes Stadthaus		80 m (262 ft)	1902	
	Rathaus Spandau		80 m (262 ft)	1910–1913	Borough town hall
26	Telefunken-Hochhaus		80 m (262 ft)	1961	Education, Research; Tallest high-rise in Berlin from 1961 to 1965; Second tallest university building (TU Berlin) in Germany
=27	Königstadt-Carrée		79 m (259 ft)	2007–2011	Office, Hotel
=27	Wohnhochhaus; Joachim-Gottschalk-Weg		79 m (259 ft)	1968	Residential; Tallest residential building in Berlin when built in 1968
=27	Piano-Hochhaus		79 m (259 ft)	1999	Office
	Neue Nazarethkirche		79 m (259 ft)	1893	Religion
30	Two Tower		78.3 m (257 ft)	1998	Office
	St.-Johannes-Basilika		78 m (256 ft)	1897	Religion
	Heilige-Geist-Kirche		78 m (256 ft)	1906	Religion
	German Cathedral		78 m (256 ft)	1785	Religion
	French Cathedral		78 m (256 ft)	1785	Religion
=31	Gasometer Schöneberg		78 m (256 ft)	1908–1910, 2020	Industry, today office
=31	RBB Zentrale		78 m (256 ft)	1966–1967	Office
=31	Axel-Springer-Hochhaus		78 m (256 ft)	1959–1964	Office
	Stephanuskirche		77 m (253 ft)	1904	Religion
=34	Ullsteinhaus		77 m (253 ft)	1927	Office; Tallest high-rise in Berlin from 1927 to 1961; Tallest high-rise in Germany from 1927 to 1957
=34	Platz der Vereinten Nationen 1/2		77 m (253 ft)	1970	Residential
	St.-Simeon-Kirche		76.5 m (251 ft)	1897	Religion
	Emmauskirche		76 m (249 ft)	1893	Religion
=36	Allee der Kosmonauten 67/69		76 m (249 ft)	1985	Residential
=36	Helene-Weigel-Platz 6/7		76 m (249 ft)	1985	Residential
=36	Helene-Weigel-Platz 13/14		76 m (249 ft)	1985	Residential
	Segenskirche		75 m (246 ft)	1908	Religion
=39	Leipziger Straße 40/41		75 m (246 ft)	1977	Residential
=39	Leipziger Straße 43/44		75 m (246 ft)	1977	Residential
=39	Leipziger Straße 46/47		75 m (246 ft)	1977	Residential
=39	Leipziger Straße 48/49		75 m (246 ft)	1977	Residential
43	Rochstraße 9		74.3 m (244 ft)	1969	Residential
	Rotes Rathaus		74 m (243 ft)	1861–1869	Town Hall
44	Anton-Saefkow-Platz 3		73.8 m (242 ft)		Residential
=45	Haus Ruth		71 m (233 ft)	2023	Residential
=45	Siemensturm		71 m (233 ft)	1918	Office
	Kaiser Wilhelm Memorial Church		71 m (233 ft)	1890s	Memorial (Ruin since 1943), Former height 113 meters
	Rathaus Friedenau		71 m (233 ft)	1913–1916	Borough town hall
	Rathaus Schöneberg		70 m (230 ft)	1911–1914	Borough town hall
=47	Spreeturm		70 m (230 ft)	2020	Office
=47	Beisheim Center - The Ritz-Carlton Berlin		70 m (230 ft)	2002–2004	Hotel
49	Tour Total (Berlin)		69 m (226 ft)	2010–2012	Office
	Neukölln Town Hall		68 m (223 ft)	1909,1914	Borough town hall
	St.-Matthäus-Kirche		68 m (223 ft)	1846	Religion
50	Waldsassener Straße 11		67 m (220 ft)	1969	Residential
51	RIU Plaza Hotel		66.7 m (219 ft)	1970	Hotel
52	Delbrück-Hochhaus (P5)		65.4 m (215 ft)	2003	Mixed-use
=53	House of Travel		65 m (213 ft)	1971	Office
=53	Grandaire		65 m (213 ft)	2020	Residential
=53	Borsigturm		65 m (213 ft)	1924	Office; First high-rise built in Berlin (The 10-story Osram Werk building (40 meters) erected in 1909 is also considered as a high-rise. Remnants of it still exist.)

== Tallest under construction ==
Name	Borough	Height (m)	Height (ft)	Floors	Year
Hines Hochhaus Berlin	Mitte	150	492	39	?
Alexander A. Tower, MonArch Turm	Mitte	150	492	35	2021
The Berlinian (former MYND-Turm)	Mitte	146	453	36	2026
ALX Tower	Mitte	134	440	?	2026
ICC Hochhaus(proposed)	Charlottenburg	106	347	29	?
Max	Friedrichshain-Kreuzberg	95	311	?	2020
Moritz	Friedrichshain-Kreuzberg	86	282	?	2020
Upbeat Berlin	Berlin-Moabit	82	269	19	2025

== Tallest demolished buildings ==
This list ranks all demolished and destroyed buildings and structures in Berlin that stood at least 165 m (541 ft) tall.

Name	Height m (ft)	Year	Construction type	Location	Coordinates	Remarks
Richtfunkstelle Berlin-Frohnau	358 m (1,175 ft)	1978	Guyed Mast	Frohnau	52°39′13.66″N 13°17′43.59″E	Demolished in 2009
Transmitter Berlin-Köpenick, J1-Mast	248 m (814 ft)	1953	Guyed Mast	Köpenick	52°28′31″N 13°35′32″E	Demolished 2002
Transmitter Berlin-Köpenick, J2-Mast	248 m (814 ft)	1953	Guyed Mast	Köpenick	52°28′31″N 13°35′32″E	Dismantled in 1984
Chimney of VEB Elektrokohle Berlin	200 m (656 ft)	?	Chimney	Lichtenberg	52° 31′ 36″ N 13° 29′ 27 E	Demolished in 1993
Radio mast Berlin-Olympiastadium	181 m (594 ft)	1951	Guyed mast	Charlottenburg	52° 31′ 1″ N, 13° 14′ 28″ E	Demolished in 2005
Sendeturm Berlin-Tegel	165 m (541 ft)	1933	Radio tower	Reinickendorf	52° 34' 8.00" N 13° 17' 35.00" E	Tallest structure of Berlin from 1933 to 1940. Tallest wood tower in the world in 1933. Demolished in 1948

== See also ==
- List of tallest buildings in Germany
- List of tallest structures in Germany
