= Deutsche Bahn =

German state-owned national railway company

Deutsche Bahn AG
- Logo since 1994
- Type: State-owned Aktiengesellschaft
- Industry: Rail transport; logistics
- Predecessors: Deutsche Reichsbahn (1920–1949); Deutsche Bundesbahn (1949–1994); Deutsche Reichsbahn (1949–1994)
- Founded: 1 January 1994 (32 years ago)
- Headquarters: Bahntower, Berlin, Germany
- Area served: Europe
- Key people: Evelyn Palla (CEO)
- Products: Rail transport; cargo transport; services
- Revenue: ▲€56.3 billion (2022)
- Net income: ▼€227 million (2022)
- Owner: Government of Germany
- Number of employees: 211,000 (Germany); 338,000 (Worldwide)
- Website: www.deutschebahn.com

Deutsche Bahn AG (Note: Pronounced /ˈdɔɪtʃə ˈbɑːn/ DOYCH-ə BAHN; German pronunciation: [ˈdɔʏtʃə ˈbaːn], lit. 'German Railway') (DB) (Note: German pronunciation: [deːˈbeː]; also abbreviated DB AG, pronounced [deːbeː aːˈɡeː].) is the national railway company of Germany, and a state-owned enterprise under the control of the German government. With its head office in the Bahntower in Berlin, it is a joint-stock company (Aktiengesellschaft, AG).

DB was founded after the merger between Deutsche Bundesbahn and the East German Deutsche Reichsbahn in 1994 after the unification of Germany and has been operating ever since. Deutsche Bahn is the second-largest transport company in Germany, after the German postal and logistics company Deutsche Post / DHL. DB provides both long-distance and regional transport, serving around 132 million long distance passengers and 1.6 billion regional passengers in 2022. In 2022, DB transported 222 million tons of cargo.

== Company profile ==
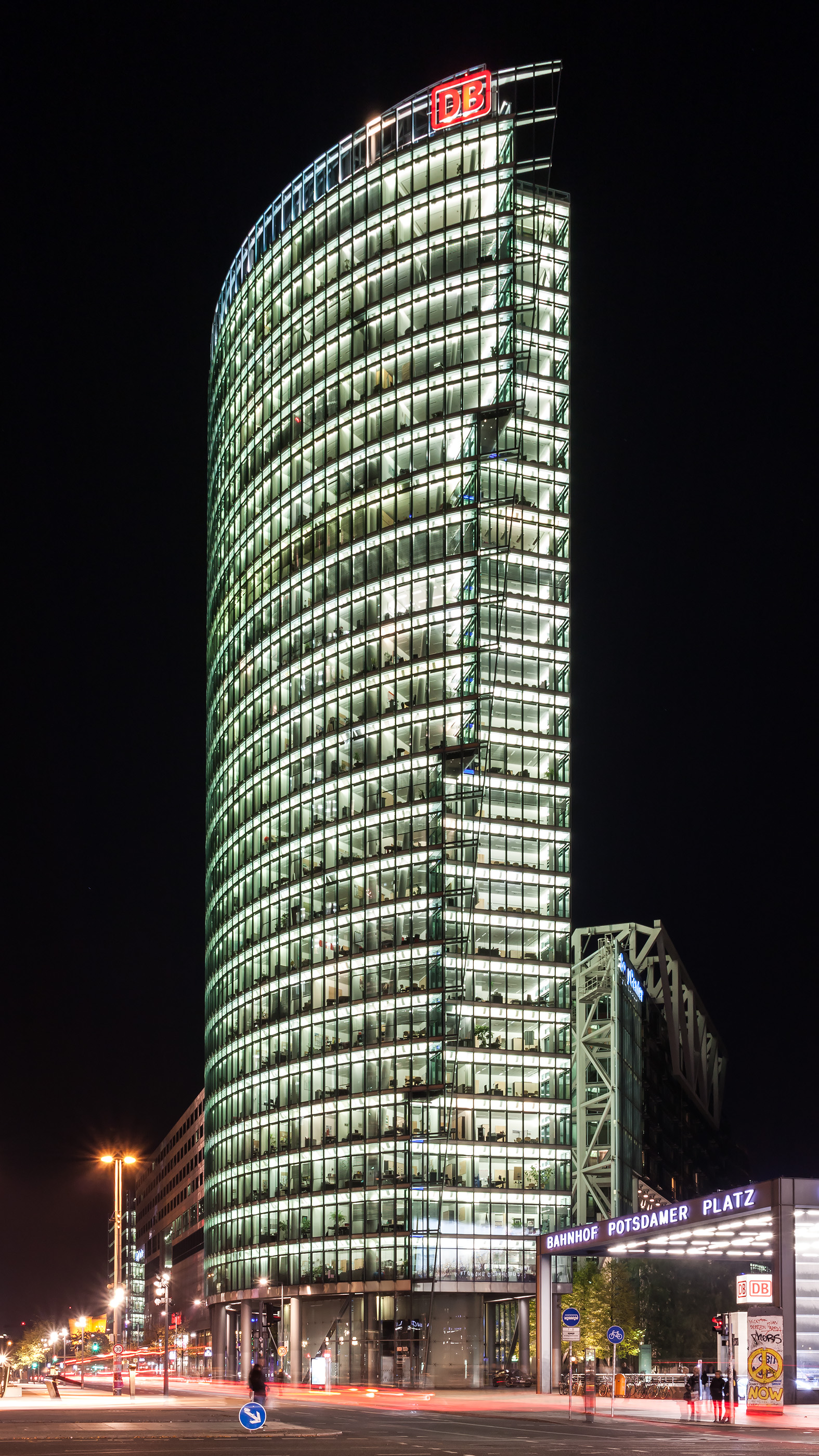
Bahntower at Potsdamer Platz in Berlin houses DB's head office

The group is divided into several companies, including DB Fernverkehr (long-distance passenger), DB Regio (local passenger services) and DB Cargo (rail freight). The Group subsidiary DB InfraGO also operates large parts of the German railway infrastructure, making it the largest rail network in Europe.

The company generates about half of its total revenue from operating rail transport, with the other half of the business comprising further transport and logistics businesses, as well as various service providers. The company generates further revenue through public transport contracts and support services for infrastructure maintenance and expansion. The Deutsche Bahn Group is divided into various organizational units that perform their tasks with subsidiaries.

== Rail transport ==
DB Personenverkehr is the unit that manages passenger travel within Germany. Originally called Reise & Touristik (lit. 'Travel and Tourism'), this group is responsible for the managing, servicing and running of German passenger services. This group is divided into DB Fernverkehr and DB Regio.

=== DB Fernverkehr ===
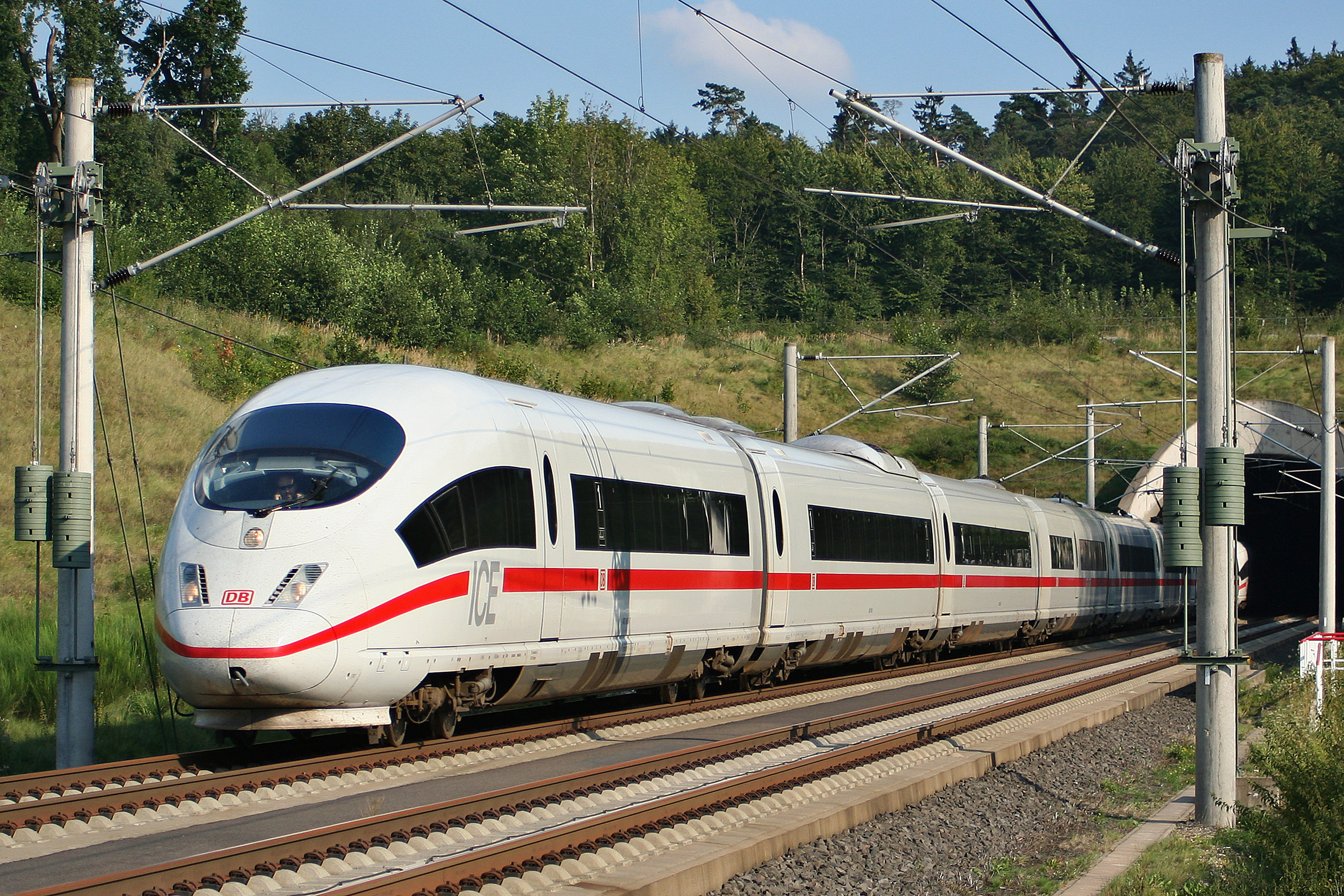
A Siemens ICE 3 long-distance high-speed train of DB Fernverkehr

DB Fernverkehr AG is a semi-independent division of Deutsche Bahn that operates long-distance passenger trains in Germany. It was founded in 1999 in the second stage of the privatisation of German Federal Railways under the name of DB Reise & Touristik and renamed in 2003.

DB Fernverkehr operates all Intercity Express and Intercity trains in Germany as well as in some neighboring countries and several EuroCity and EuroCityExpress trains throughout Europe. Unlike its sister companies DB Regio and DB Cargo, DB Fernverkehr still holds a de facto monopoly in its segment of the market as it operates hundreds of trains per day, while all competitors' long-distance services combined amount to no more than 10–15 trains per day.

DB Fernverkehr operated a few long-distance coach services throughout Germany, called IC Bus, which since have been terminated.

=== DB Regio ===
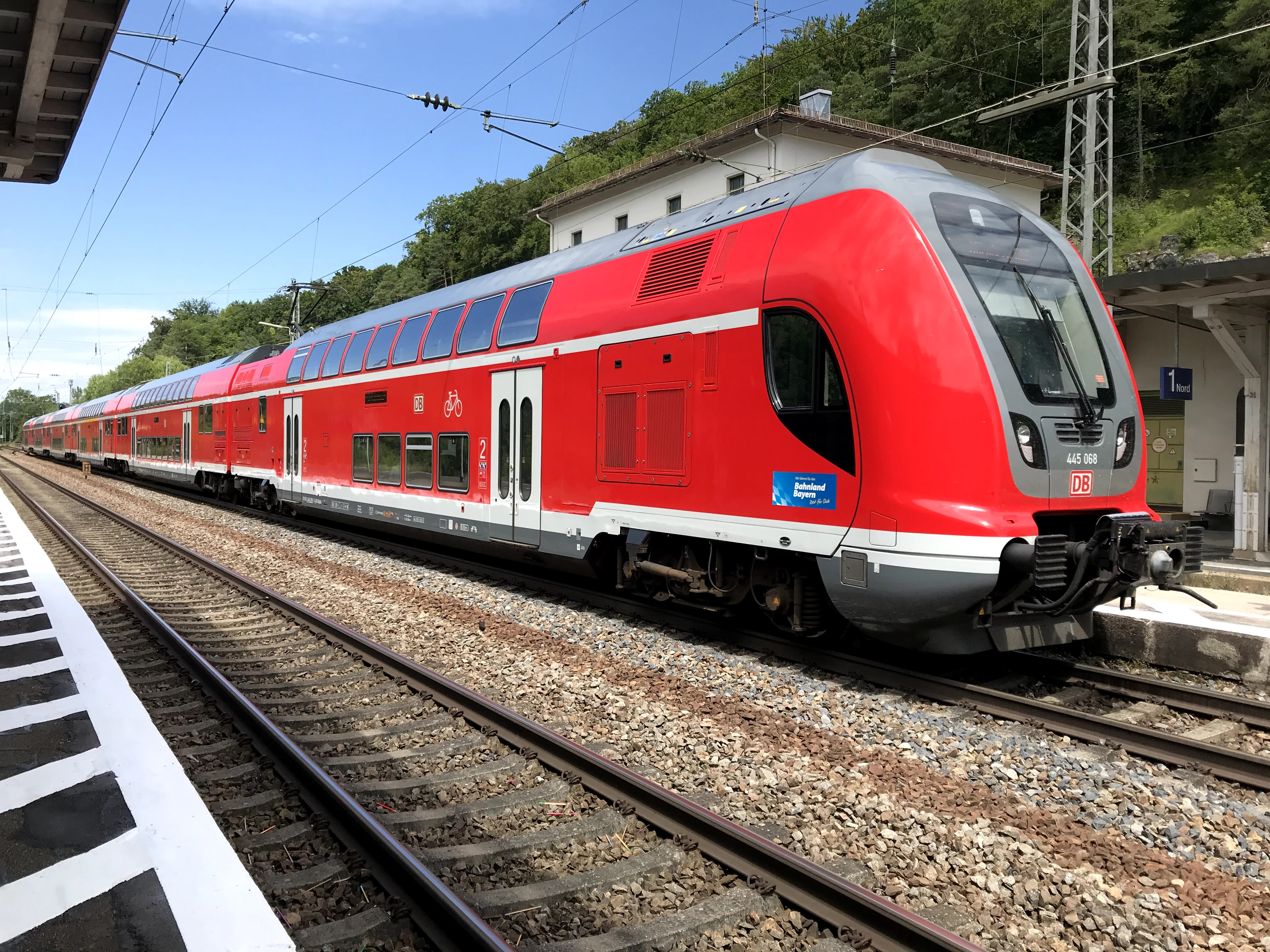
A Bombardier Twindexx regional train of DB Regio

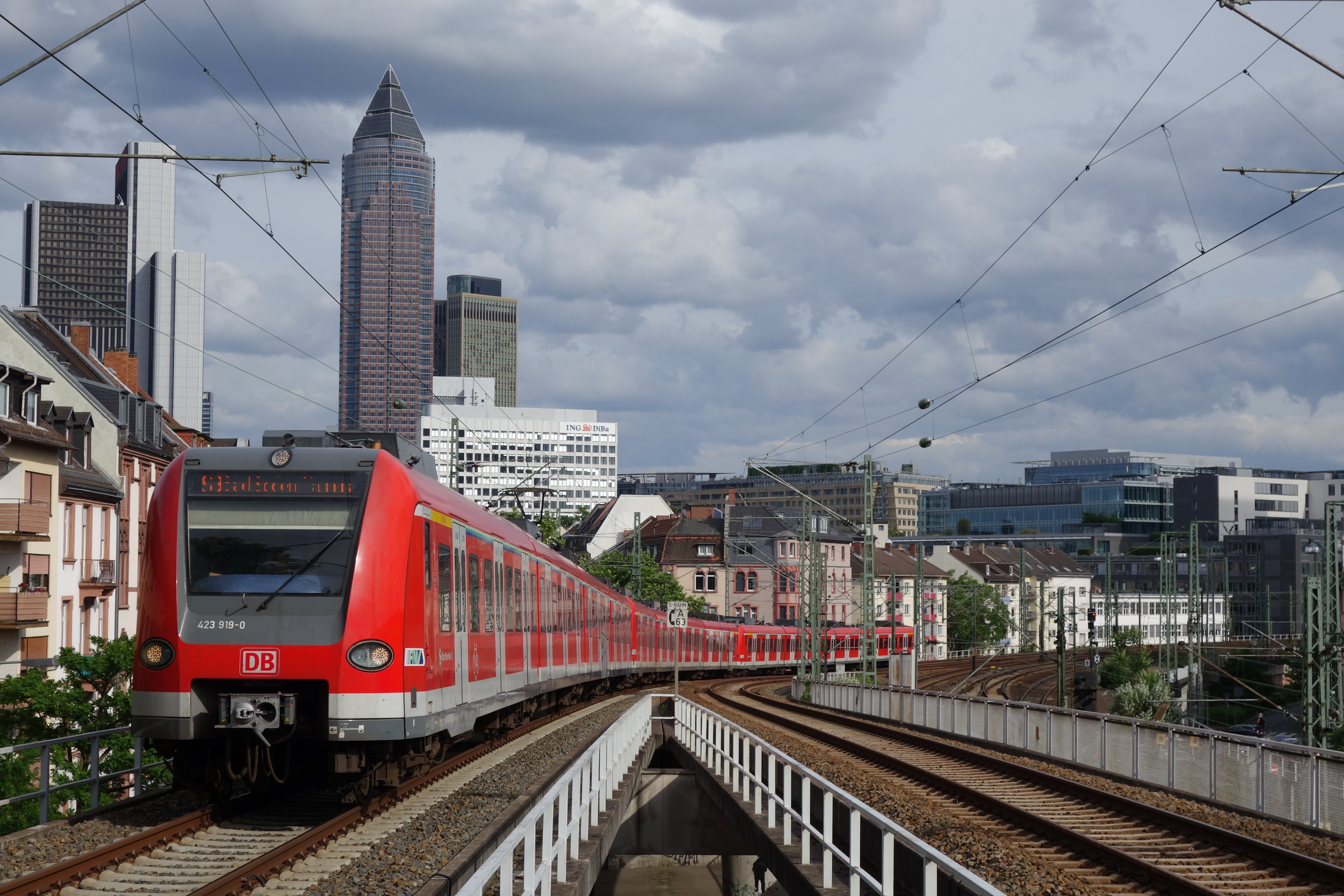
DBAG Class 423 serving as S-Bahn in the urban area Frankfurt Rhine-Main

DB Regio AG is the subsidiary of Deutsche Bahn that operates passenger trains on short and medium distances in Germany. Unlike its long-distance counterpart, DB Fernverkehr, it does not operate trains on its own account. Traffic is ordered and paid for by the Bundesländer (states) or their respective regional train operation supervisors.

Some states have awarded long-term contracts to DB Regio (usually 10 to 15 years), in others, DB Regio's operations are decreasing, in North Rhine-Westphalia, their market share is expected to be lower than 50%. DB Regio rail services are divided into several regional companies:

- DB Regio Nord for Schleswig-Holstein, Hamburg, Lower Saxony, Bremen
- DB Regio Nordost for Berlin, Brandenburg, Mecklenburg-Vorpommern
- DB Regio NRW for North Rhine-Westphalia
- DB Regio Südost for Saxony, Saxony-Anhalt, Thuringia
- DB Regio Mitte for Rhineland-Palatinate, Saarland, Hesse and parts of Baden-Württemberg
- DB Regio Baden-Württemberg for the rest of Baden-Württemberg
- DB Regio Bayern for Bavaria
- S-Bahn Hamburg
- S-Bahn Berlin
- RegioNetz (small, independent networks, like Erzgebirgsbahn, Gäubodenbahn, Kurhessenbahn, Oberweißbacher Bergbahn, Südostbayernbahn, Westfrankenbahn for easier organisation)

The bus services consist of 25 bus companies, which have subsidiary companies themselves.

== Logistics ==
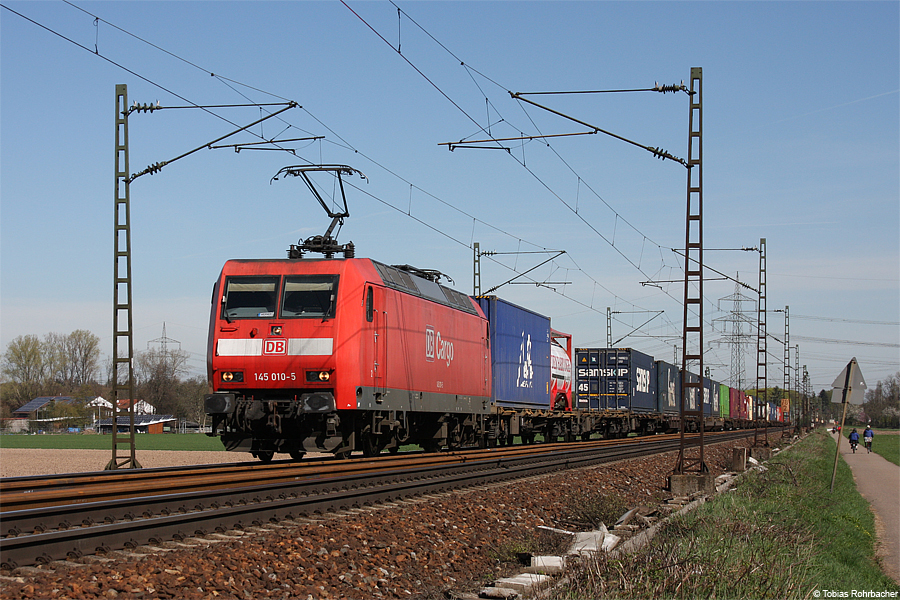
Freight train from DB Cargo in Germany

The Transport and Logistics division acted in the market with the business units DB Schenker and DB Cargo, which were combined under the umbrella of DB Schenker, and the Intermodal division, which operates in combined transport. In 2016, rail freight transport was separated from logistics and DB Schenker Rail was renamed DB Cargo.

In cooperation with the logistics provider time:matters, DB also offers the transport of shipments weighing up to 20 kg (44 lb) on its EC/IC/ICE trains.

== Infrastructure ==
=== DB InfraGO ===
The infrastructure division was divided into the DB Netz (rail infrastructure), DB Station&Service (stations and services) and DB Energie (energy) business units. At the end of December 2023, DB Netz merged with DB Station&Service to create DB InfraGO AG. The new company is intended to reduce poor communication between the two previously separate infrastructure firms.

=== DB Engineering & Consulting ===
DB Engineering & Consulting, which is responsible for construction supervision, construction planning and maintenance, is also assigned to this department without being part of a business area. Via its subsidiary DB Engineering & Consulting, DB signed a memorandum of understanding with Iranian rail operator Bonyad Eastern Railways (BonRail) in May 2017 and shortly after a consulting contract with Islamic Republic of Iran Railways; both projects were abandoned after the United States imposed new sanctions against Iran and said firms doing business with Iran would be barred from doing business with the United States.

The California High-Speed Rail Authority's (CHSRA) board approved on 15 November 2017 an early train operator contract with DB Engineering & Consulting USA. The firm is the U.S. arm of Deutsche Bahn AG. As early train operator, DB Engineering & Consulting will assist CHSRA with planning, designing and implementing the state's high-speed rail program.

== Foreign ventures ==
=== Arriva ===
Deutsche Bahn purchased Arriva in August 2010 off the London Stock Exchange. To satisfy the European Commission, Arriva's German operations were rebranded Netinera and sold. As of July 2022, Arriva operated 15,700 buses and 800 railway vehicles in 14 European countries, mainly in the United Kingdom and Ireland. In 2019, Deutsche Bahn unsuccessfully tried to sell the business. In October 2023, Deutsche Bahn agreed on terms to sell Arriva to I Squared Capital, with the transaction scheduled to be completed in 2024. The sale was completed on 4 June 2024 at a reported price of £1.4 billion.

=== DB Cargo UK ===
DB also has interests abroad, owning the United Kingdom's largest rail freight operator, DB Cargo UK, which also operates the British Royal Train and also has interests in Eastern Europe. It is possible to obtain train times for any journey in Europe from Deutsche Bahn's website.

=== Trans-Eurasia Logistics ===
Trans-Eurasia Logistics is a joint venture with Russian Railways (RŽD) that operates container freight trains between Germany and China via Russia.

== History ==
=== Background: the Deutsche Reichsbahn ===
The railway network in Germany dates back to 1835 when the first tracks were laid on a 6 km (3.7 mi) route between Nuremberg and Fürth. The Deutsche Reichsbahn operated from 1920 through the Weimar and Nazi eras until 1949, when it was split between East and West Germany into two successor entities, Deutsche Reichsbahn and Deutsche Bundesbahn, respectively. They remained separate throughout the Cold War era division of Germany, and joined after the 1989 fall of the Berlin Wall, and German reunification in 1990. On 1 January 1994 Deutsche Reichsbahn and Deutsche Bundesbahn were merged to form one company, Deutsche Bahn, the successor organisation to the Reichsbahn. At the same time, Deutsche Bahn adopted its current logo and DB abbreviation. Kurt Weidemann modernised the logo and typographer Erik Spiekermann designed a new corporate font known as DB Type. When Deutsche Bahn was formed in January 1994, it became a joint stock-company, and was designed to operate the railways of both the former East and West Germany after unification in October 1990 as a single, uniform, and private company. There are three main periods of development in this unified German railway: its formation, its early years (1994–1999), and the period from 1999 to the present.

Originally, DBAG had its head office in Frankfurt am Main but moved to Potsdamer Platz in central Berlin in 1996, where it occupies a 26-storey office tower designed by Helmut Jahn at the eastern end of the Sony Centre and named Bahntower. As the lease was to expire in 2010, DB had announced plans to relocate to Berlin Hauptbahnhof, and in 2007 a proposal for a new head office by 3XN Architects won an architectural competition which also included Foster + Partners, Dominique Perrault and Auer + Weber. However, these plans were put on hold due to the 2008 financial crisis, and the Bahntower lease was extended. Construction of the new head office building was started in 2017 under the title "Cube Berlin" according to the designs by 3XN. Finished in February 2020, the Cube will house the legal offices of Deutsche Bahn, but not become the main head office.

=== 1999 to present ===
The second step of the Bahnreform (railway reform) was carried out in 1999. All rolling stock, track, personnel, and real assets were divided between the subsidiaries of DBAG: DB Reise & Touristik AG (long-distance passenger service, later renamed DB Station & Service AG (operating the stations)). This new organisational scheme was introduced not least to implement European Community directive 91/440/EEC that requires open access operations on railway lines by companies other than those that own the rail infrastructure.

In December 2007, DB reorganised again, bringing all passenger services into its DB Bahn arm, logistics under DB Schenker and infrastructure and operations under DB Netze.

The DB is owned by the Federal Republic. By the Constitution, the Federal Republic is required to retain (directly or indirectly) a majority of the infrastructure (the present DB Netze) stocks.

In 2008, it was agreed to "float" a portion of the business, meaning an end to the 100% share the German Federal Republic had in it, with a plan that 25% of the overall share would be sold to the private sector. However the onset of the 2008 financial crisis saw this cancelled.

In 2014, the Jewish community of Thessaloniki demanded that the Deutsche Bahn, which is the successor of the Deutsche Reichsbahn, should reimburse the heirs of Greek Holocaust victims of Thessaloniki for train fares that they were forced to pay for their deportation from Thessaloniki to Auschwitz and Treblinka between March and August 1943.

In June 2018 controversy grew in the United Kingdom over widespread cancellations of railway services and numerous delayed services operated by Deutsche Bahn in Britain, under its Northern brand. This resulted in Britain's Minister of Transport, Chris Grayling, setting up an enquiry into whether the Deutsche Bahn subsidiary had breached its contractual agreement to provide railway services in the north of England.

In 2024, Deutsche Bahn faced significant operational challenges during the Euro 2024 football tournament, including frequent train delays, cancellations, and infrastructure issues. The rail carrier reported a €1 billion half year net loss stemming from investments to repair its rail network, strikes and bad weather in July of the same year. As a result, Deutsche Bahn announced that they would shed 30,000 administrative jobs, roughly equal to 9% of their workforce.

In September 2024, the company came to an agreement with DSV of Denmark, a logistics company; in the agreement, DSV will acquire Schenker from Deutsche Bahn for $15.84 billion.

In 2026, Deutsche Bahn banned Alcohol in all of their stations.

=== Logo ===
1 April 1920 to 26 April 1945,
operating as Deutsche Reichsbahn

30 August 1924 to 31 December 1993,
operating as Deutsche Reichsbahn.
This mark was used in tandem with the previous logo until April 1945.

10 October 1946 to 31 December 1993,
operating as Deutsche Bundesbahn

Current logo, in use since 1 January 1994,
operating as Deutsche Bahn

== Train categories ==
Trains in Germany are classified by their stopping pattern, average speed and level of comfort provided:

=== Long-distance trains ===
- ICE (Intercity-Express) for high-speed long-distance train services between major cities and regions. Certain routes also cross European borders into the Netherlands, Belgium, France, Switzerland and Austria.
- EC (EuroCity) for intercity trains that cross borders, and connect Germany with other countries. Can also be operated by foreign state railways.
- IC (InterCity) for long-distance semi-high-speed services that connect regions and cities. IC services are slightly lower in class than ICE services, with trains reaching lower speeds (average around 160 – 220 km/h) and with more frequent stops. On some IC routes the trains use legacy railway lines instead of the high-speed lines the ICE takes. International IC services are usually operated as EuroCity.

Just as ICE, EC and (few) IC cross European borders, train categories of other operators cross into Germany and are operated in cooperation with Deutsche Bahn:

- ECE for international high-speed rail services in cooperation with SBB. Currently two routes (Frankfurt-Milan and Munich-Zurich).
- TGV in cooperation with SNCF from France to Frankfurt and Munich via Stuttgart.
- Railjet from Austria to Munich and Frankfurt in cooperation with ÖBB and from Prague to Copenhagen via Berlin and Hamburg in cooperation with ČD.

=== Regional trains ===
- IRE (Interregio-Express) are longer distance RE trains that connect regions and cities. IRE trains only exist in the Berlin-Lichtenberg — Wrocław Główny route.
- RE (Regional-Express) serve regions and connects cities, and do not stop at every station on the route.
- RB (Regionalbahn) stop at all stations on the route (except where S-Bahn is available) and are often the most basic train service available.
- S (S-Bahn) is a type of rapid transit for larger cities and stop at all stations. S-Bahn operate high-frequency services and are usually characterised by crossing through the city centre with dense station spacing.

There are several other operators in Germany which sometimes offer other categories, also, a local transport authority or tariff associations might brand the trains in a different way than DB does. For example, in the Nuremberg region, RE and RB trains are not differentiated, but called R instead. In some regions, such as Verkehrsverbund Berlin-Brandenburg, private operators do use the RE and RB labels, in others, such as Saxony, they do not. In online and print information systems of DB, private trains officially labelled RB and RE by their operators, might get a different label, for example "ABR" for trains operated by Abellio, though on platforms, trains and maps or timetables issued by the local transport authority overseeing regional train services, these abbreviations usually do not appear.

=== Former categories ===
- D (D-Zug or Schnellzug, abbreviated from Durchgangszug) was the express train category and used to be the highest train category. It was replaced by IC and the even faster ICE. The trains of the SyltShuttle plus car shuttle service connecting the island of Sylt with the mainland are still officially referred to as D trains.
- E (Eilzug) was the semi-fast service offering faster journeys than normal passenger trains but not at such long distances and speed as D trains, though there were some quite long running E trains. No direct successor, would be located between RE and IC.
- IR (InterRegio), set between RE and IC was meant to connect cities and regions at a lower price, but also be used for local traffic. Replaced partly by IC, RE and IRE.
- MET (Metropolitan) was a luxury train service between Hamburg and Cologne from 1999 to 2004. The two special MET train sets were used for IC and ICE services afterwards until 2021, and had a comfort level above the regular IC and ICE coaches.
- N (Nahverkehrszug), the most basic form of train service stopping at all stations. When all local train services were vertaktet, i.e. operating at a fixed interval (mostly one train per hour), they were rebranded as RB.
- SE (Stadt-Express) operated as a mixture of RE and RB: trains skipped many stations in urban areas but made all stops in the countryside. Rebranded as RE and RB. In some regions, such as Rhine-Main (Frankfurt, Rhein-Main-Verkehrsverbund), the local transit authority advertised trains as SE. Internally, DB classified them as either RE or RB, but even DB trains display "SE" on their destination boards. This ceased in December 2016.

== Tickets ==
DB offers two different pricing models for single or return tickets for routes that include long-distance trains:

- The Flexpreis (originally Normalpreis): gives full flexibility, i.e., all trains on the given date can be used on the chosen route. This price is independent of the time of purchase for a given route and tickets are reimbursable prior to the day of departure.
- The Sparpreis and Super-Sparpreis are generally cheaper tickets that must be purchased in advance and are only valid for a specific connection.

Ticket prices generally rise degressively over distance, particularly for Sparpreise and Supersparpreise. Seat reservations are included only for first class Flexpreis tickets and seating capacity without reservation is not assured, even for tickets valid on one particular connection only.

Local trains (S, RB, RE, IRE) also accept tickets issued by local transport associations, which can also be used on buses, trams, and U-Bahn trains.

DB offers concessionary fares with the BahnCard discount cards, which are available as BahnCard 25 (25% discount on Flexpreis and Sparpreis), BahnCard 50 (50% discount on Flexpreis and 25% discount on Sparpreis), and BahnCard 100 (unlimited travel on all Deutsche Bahn trains, a few private train companies and also in many local transport associations).

Other special tickets, such as the Länder-Tickets ("state tickets"), which give unlimited journeys on local trains and in many transport associations within a state, and Interrail are also available. These tickets offer group tickets, where up to five people can travel on a single ticket.

== Sponsorship ==
Deutsche Bahn sponsored the German football club Hertha BSC between 2006 and 2015.

== Incidents ==
- 2025 Riedlingen derailment (2025)
- 2025 Hamburg train accident
- Garmisch-Partenkirchen train derailment (2022)
- Bad Aibling rail accident (2016)
- 2012 Stuttgart derailments
- Hordorf train collision (2011)
- Brühl train derailment (2000)
- Eschede train disaster (1998)

== See also ==
- Rail transport in Germany
- Railway electrification system
- Transport in Germany
