= Stream Tower =

High-rise building in Berlin, Germany

- Bachturm (German)
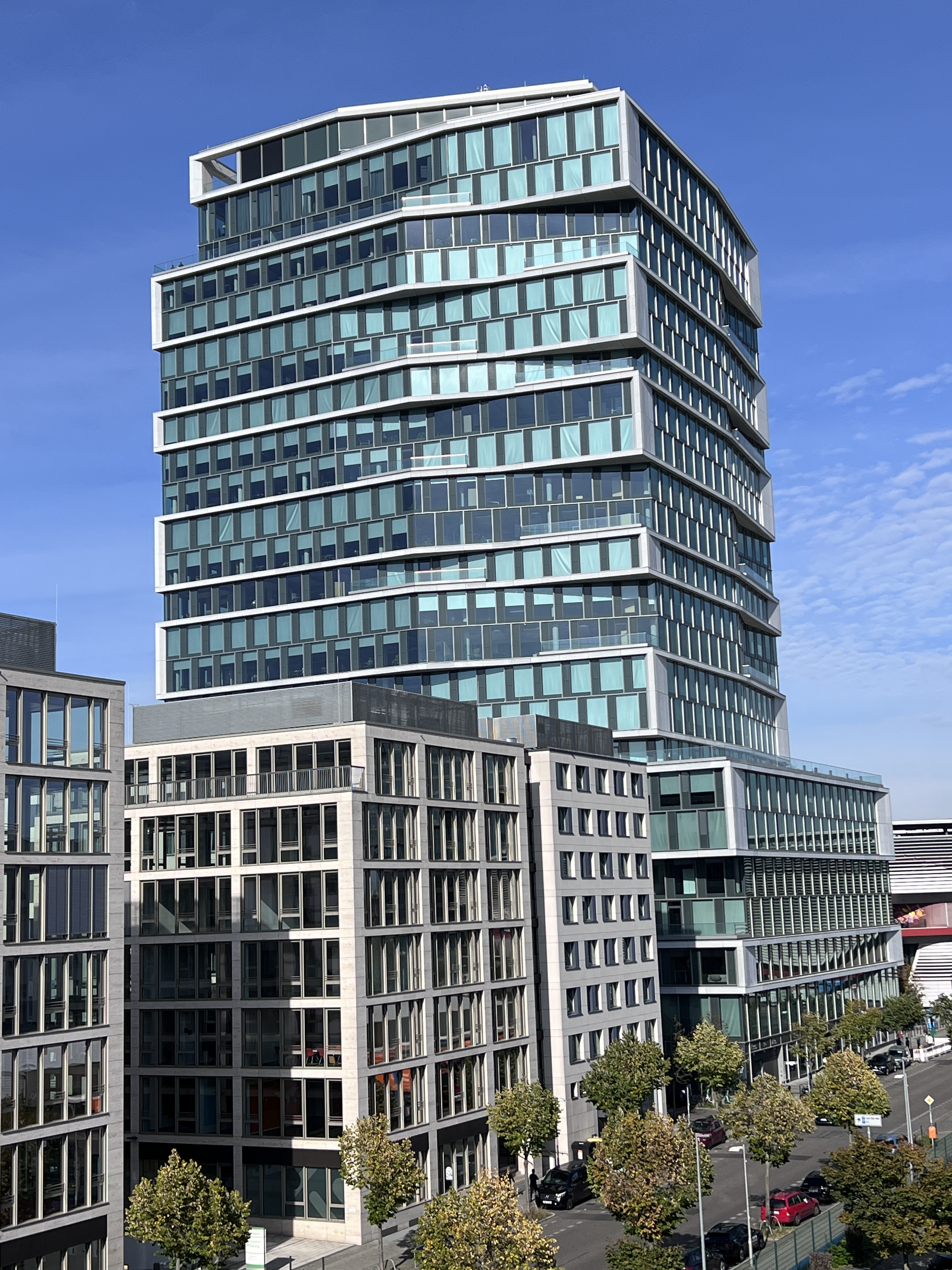
- Interactive map of the Stream Tower area

General information
- Status: Completed
- Type: Office
- Location: Berlin, Germany, 7 Hedwig-Wachenheim-Straße, Friedrichshain, Berlin, Germany
- Coordinates: 52.50505°N 13.44485°E
- Construction started: 2019
- Completed: 2021
- Owner: PGIM Real Estate

Height
- Roof: 97.5 m (320 ft)

Technical details
- Structural system: Concrete
- Floor count: 24 (+2 underground)
- Floor area: 57,000 m^{2} (614,000 sq ft)

Design and construction
- Architects: Gewers & Pudewill
- Developer: Signa Holding
- Structural engineer: wh-p Ingenieure

The Stream Tower (German: Bachturm) is a high-rise office building in the Friedrichshain district of Berlin, Germany. Built between 2019 and 2021, the tower stands at 97.5 m (320 ft) tall with 24 floors and is the current 14th tallest building in Berlin.

== History ==
The new high-rise building with 24 floors and around 57,000 m^{2} (614,000 sq ft) of gross floor area was designed by the Berlin architectural firm Gewers Pudewill. The groundbreaking ceremony took place on March 6, 2019. From the seventh floor onwards, the building is staggered in depth and is described by the architects as an "urban sculpture".

Construction was completed at the beginning of 2022 and handed over by the client, the Austrian company Signa Holding, to the main tenant Zalando.

The building was the 2024 recipient of the "Excellent Architecture" German Design Award.

=== Architecture ===
The concept which stood behind the creation of the building involved organizing the sizeable building with a winding concrete strip structure that folds upwards, creating visual distortion on the vast facade areas and contributing to the urban aspect. The terraces and loggias created by horizontal movements link the house to the city. The dynamic folding design provides varying perspectives of the building from various angles, enhancing the liveliness of the urban area.

The building's interior consists of exposed concrete and wood, creating a sturdy foundation for potential future uses. Two terraces on each floor of the building, one facing southeast and one facing west, can be effectively used along with multiple lounges and meeting rooms interspersed throughout, creating a contemporary office layout.

== See also ==
- List of tallest buildings in Berlin
- List of tallest buildings in Germany
