= Motel One =

German low cost hotel chain

Coordinates: 48.10926°N 11.57951°E

- Company type: Private
- Industry: Hospitality
- Founded: 2000; 26 years ago
- Founder: Dieter Müller
- Headquarters: Munich, Germany
- Area served: Worldwide
- Brands: The Cloud One
- Revenue: €980 million (2024)
- Number of employees: 3.634 (2024)
- Parent: Motel One Group GmbH
- Website: www.motel-one.com

Motel One is a German hotel chain headquartered in Munich. It operates properties in eleven European countries as well as one hotel in New York City. A few of the company's hotels use their upscale subsidiary brand The Cloud One instead.

== History ==
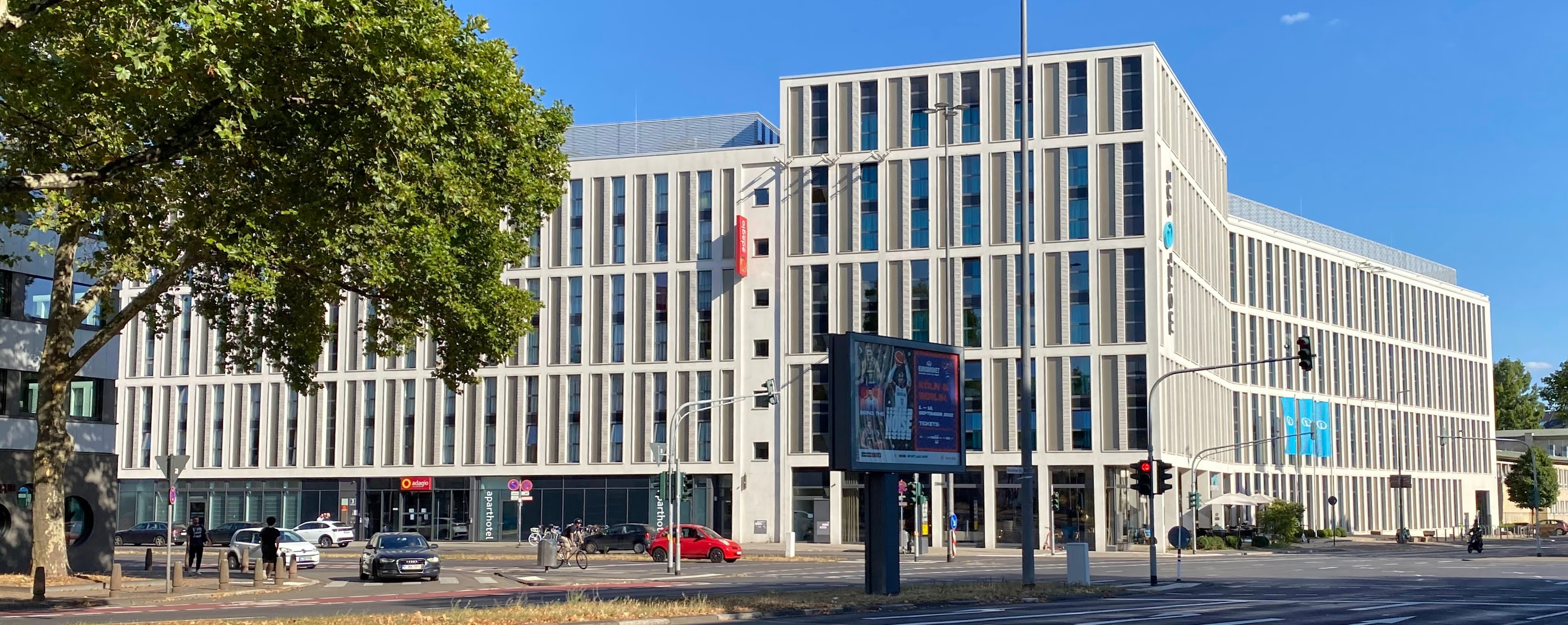
Motel One in Cologne

It was founded in 2000 by the former Accor manager Dieter Müller in Munich and is now run by him and his wife, Ursula Schelle-Müller. In the same year, the first Motel One opened in Offenbach am Main. Hotels in Schweinfurt, Lohfelden, Ratingen and Kleinmachnow followed – in places that are mostly close to big cities but outside the inner city. In 2004 the motel-one management changed its strategy, concentrating on opening new motels in central locations in the big cities. In the year 2015, nine small hotels were sold, for the start-up phase, to the real estate investor FDM Management, which operates them as Première-Classe-Hotels.

== Corporate affairs ==
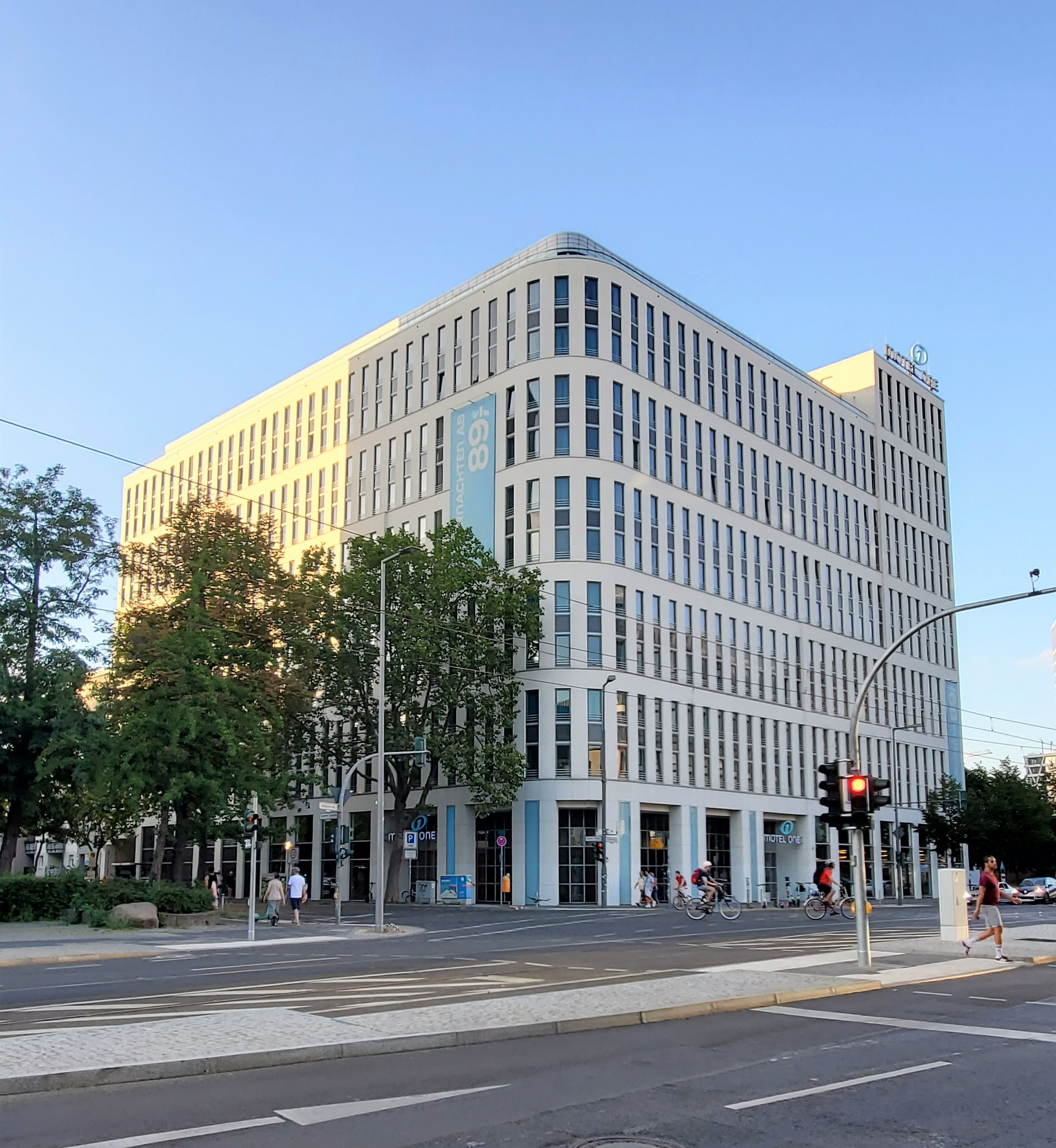
Motel One in Berlin

In the 2012 financial year, an average utilization rate of 73 percent was achieved with more than 2.5 million rented rooms. Sales of the hotel companies rose by 30 percent to 175 million Euro and the EBITDA from 44 to 62 million Euro. Earnings before taxes were up 45 percent to 34 million Euro.

At the beginning of 2016, Motel One had 53 hotels with over 14,000 rooms, most of them in Germany, six in Salzburg and Vienna in Austria, six in the United Kingdom (3 in Scotland and one in London), and one in Belgium, the Netherlands and the Czech Republic. The company currently employs over 2000 people. Although in January 2015 it was announced that Motel One would separate from nine hotels from the first generation by January 31, 2015, [3] but further advances in expansion would continue. By 2017, 74 hotels with 18,000 rooms are to be part of the company.

The portfolio is increasingly shifting to other European countries. The company aimed to achieve an international share of 40 percent by 2016. The operator of Motel One is One Hotels & Resorts AG, of whose majority shareholder Müller holds 57 percent. Investors were two sons of Dietmar Hopp and Morgan Stanley.

In summer of 2015, the opening of the new Motel One at the new central station of Vienna with 533 rooms spread over 18 floors. It became the largest Motel One so far.

== Description ==
The interior of the companies hotels uses the corporate identity colors brown and turquoise. Motel One offers the guest an average of 16 square meters of room, without a closet, telephone, mini-bar and room service, but therefore an individually designed lounge in each hotel.

The lounge, breakfast café and bar area in the One Lounge is typically regionally themed. At the Motel One on the Waidmarkt in Cologne, the theme is "Eau de Cologne". The Motel One Dresden on the Zwinger opened in April 2013 and is based on the theme "Zwinger". The Motel One in Immermannstraße near Düsseldorf's main railway station has been open since June 2013; The theme "Japan" is reflected again in the lobby. Opened on 1 December 2014, the Motel One London Tower Hill is dedicated to the theme of the British Crown Jewels, which are kept in the nearby Tower of London.

== Locations ==
=== Motel One ===
As of 2024, Motel One operates the majority of its hotels in 25 German cities, several of which feature more than one property with 10 Motel Ones in Berlin alone. Additional hotels are located in Austria, Belgium, the Czech Republic, Denmark, France, Ireland, the Netherlands, Poland, Switzerland, Spain and the United Kingdom.

=== The Cloud One ===
Currently five locations are marketed using the company's upscale brand The Cloud One introduced in 2023. These are located in Düsseldorf, Hamburg, Nuremberg, Prague and New York City. Some of these are repurposed and remodelled former Motel One locations.
