= Bahntower =

Skyscraper in Berlin, Germany

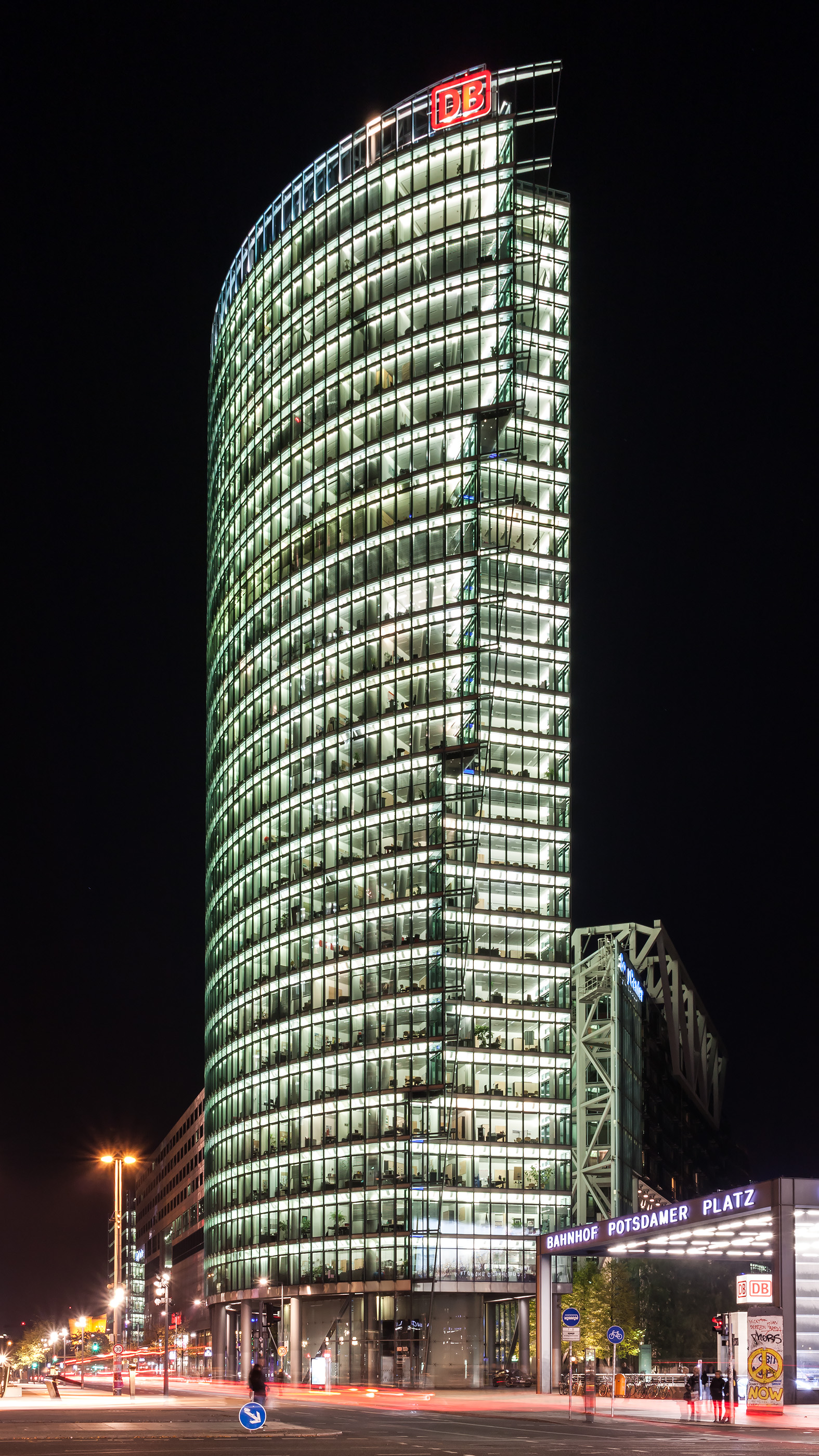
- Bahntower in 2014
- Interactive map of the Bahntower area

General information
- Type: Commercial offices
- Location: Potsdamer Platz, Berlin, Germany
- Coordinates: 52°30′35″N 13°22′30″E
- Construction started: 1998
- Opening: 2000
- Owner: Morgan Stanley

Height
- Antenna spire: 103 m (338 ft)
- Roof: 94 m (308 ft)

Technical details
- Floor count: 26
- Floor area: 22,000 m^{2} (240,000 sq ft)

Design and construction
- Architect: Helmut Jahn
- Developer: Deutsche Bahn
- Main contractor: Hochtief AG

The Bahntower (English: Railway Tower), also written as BahnTower and Bahn-Tower, is a 26-story, 103-metre (338 ft) skyscraper on the Potsdamer Platz in Berlin, Germany. Built between 1998 and 2000, the Bahntower provides 22,000 m^{2} (240,000 sq ft) of office space for the headquarters of Deutsche Bahn (English: German Railway). It is the tenth-tallest building in Berlin and the seventy-eighth tallest building in Germany.

== History ==
In 2007 and 2008, it was reported that small pieces of glass had fallen onto the street from cracks in the façade. This was followed by a near-fatal incident in 2016 in which a pane of glass measuring 30 by 150 cm (1 by 5 ft) fell onto a car on the street below.

The original owner of the skyscraper was Sony as part of the wider Sony Center. In February 2008, Morgan Stanley and others bought the Sony Center with the tower for €600 million. In 2007, Deutsche Bahn had planned to move to a new headquarters built by Danish company 3XN outside the Berlin Hauptbahnhof, although this fell through and Deutsche Bahn extended its Bahntower contract.

When Morgan Stanley's real estate funds came into difficulties they sold their stake to South Korea's National Pension Service in 2010.

In 2016, the Bahntower was featured in the Berlin skyline scene, which is part of the Lego Architecture series.
