= Nico van der Laan =

Dutch architect (1908–1986)

Nico van der Laan (25 August 1908 – 20 September 1986) was a Dutch architect, as were his father Leo van der Laan and his brothers Jan and Hans, with whom he was closely associated.

== Life and work ==
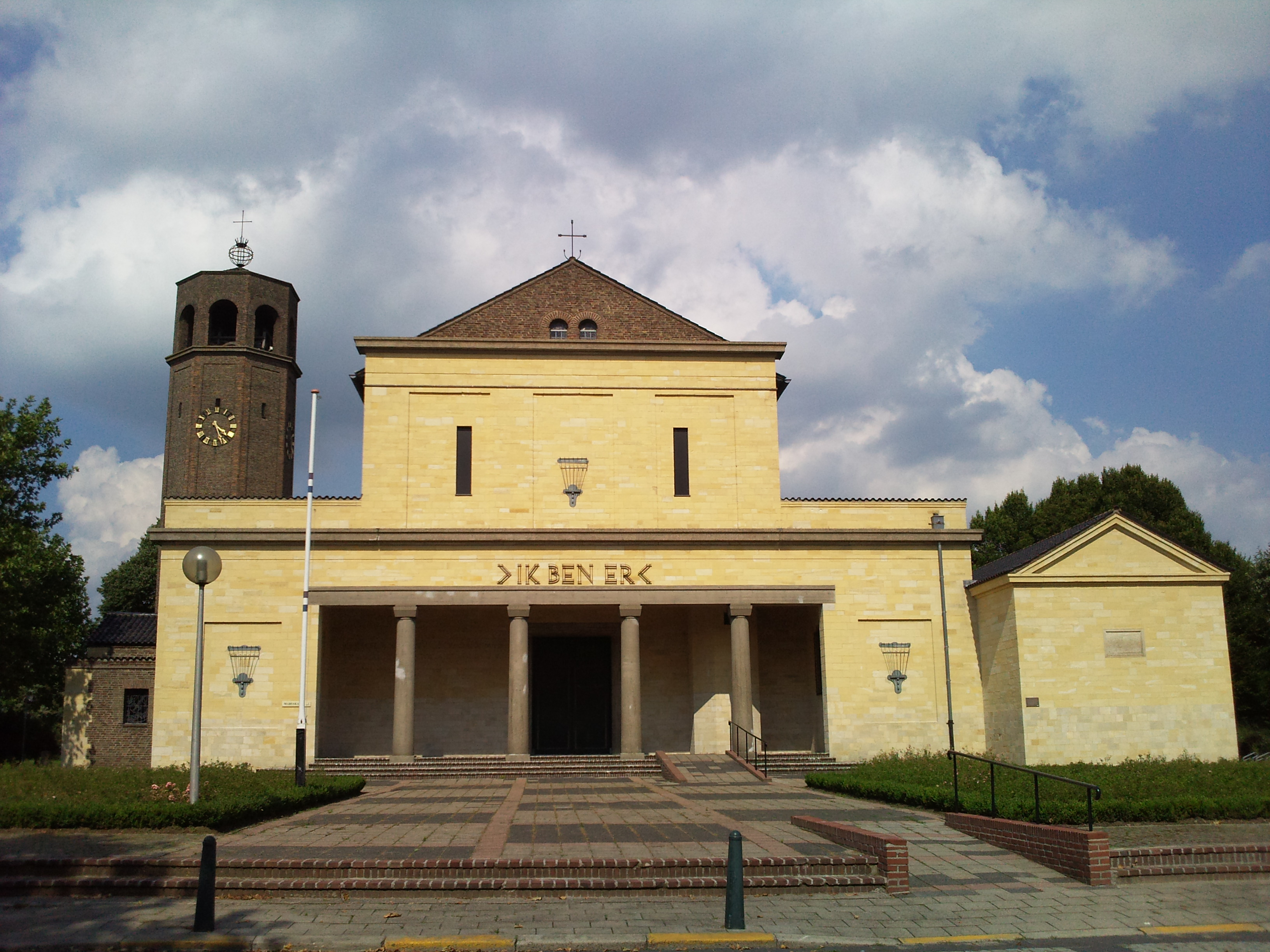
St. Martin's Church, Gennep, in 2010

Nico van der Laan was born in Leiden, son of the architect Leo van der Laan. He studied to 1937 at the Technische Hogeschool in Delft. His eldest brother Jan took over their father's architectural practice in Leiden.

Together with his brother Hans, who in 1927 became a Benedictine monk at Oosterhout Abbey, Nico immersed himself in the theory of the origins of architecture.

After World War II, with his brother Hans, he led a course in Church Architecture in the Kruithuis in 's-Hertogenbosch, using the early Christian basilica as an example, for training architects in the post-war reconstruction of ecclesiastical buildings. From these courses arose the Bossche School, a name given by opponents of the Van der Laan brothers and their followers.

One of his most notable buildings is St. Martin's Church in Gennep. His brother Hans was also very probably involved in the construction of this church, and drawings of it in Hans' hand are known. Nico also supported his brother in other ways, in terms of finance and morale.

From 1946 Nico van der Laan also had his own architectural practice.

== Sources ==
- Remery, Michael, 2010: Mystery and Matter: On the Relationship Between Liturgy and Architecture in the Thought of Dom Hans van der Laan OSB (1904-1991 (Studies in Religion and the Arts vol. 3). Brill ISSN 1877-3192 Online version
