= Bossche School =

Historical architecture style

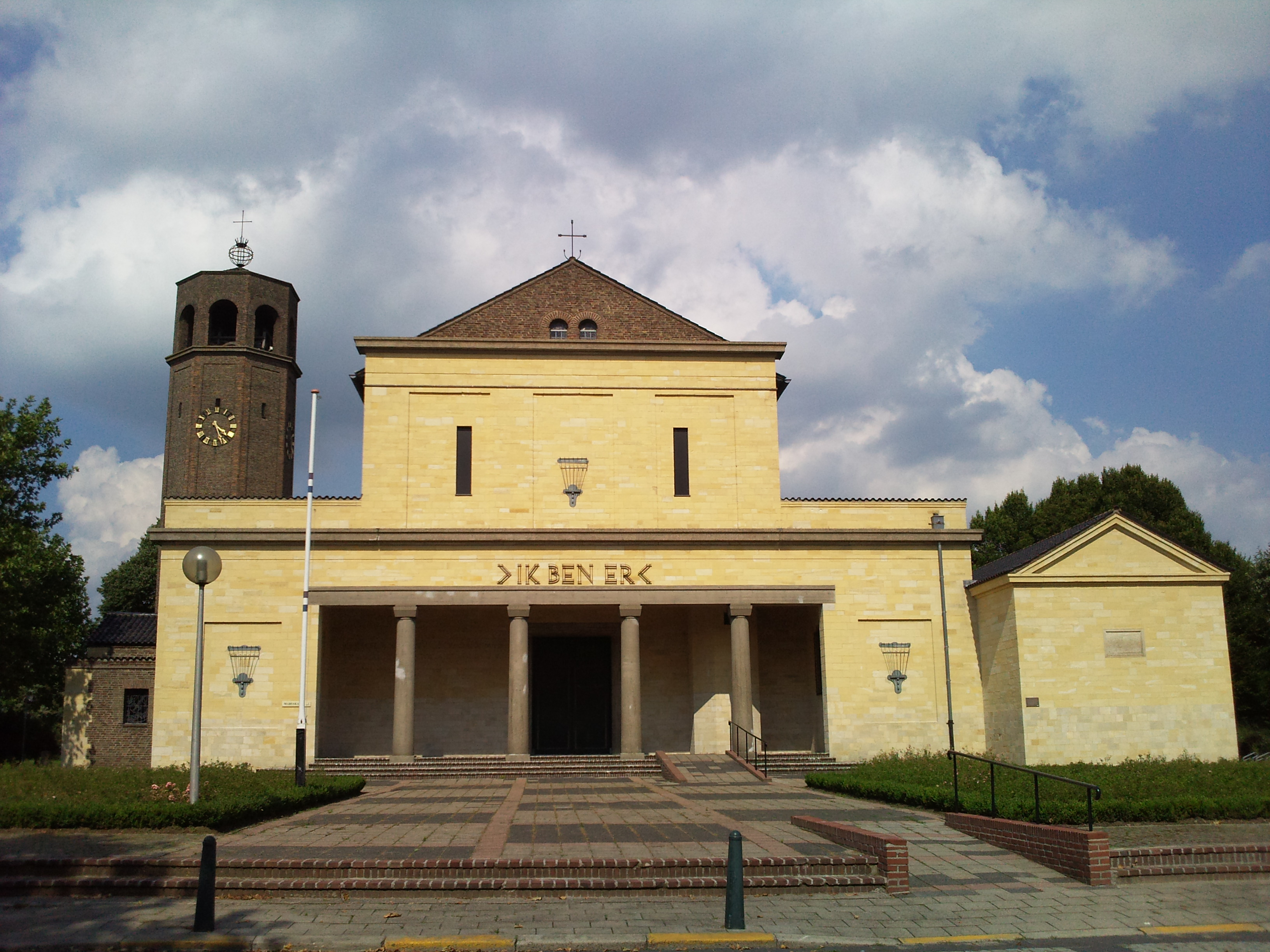
St. Martin's Church, Gennep

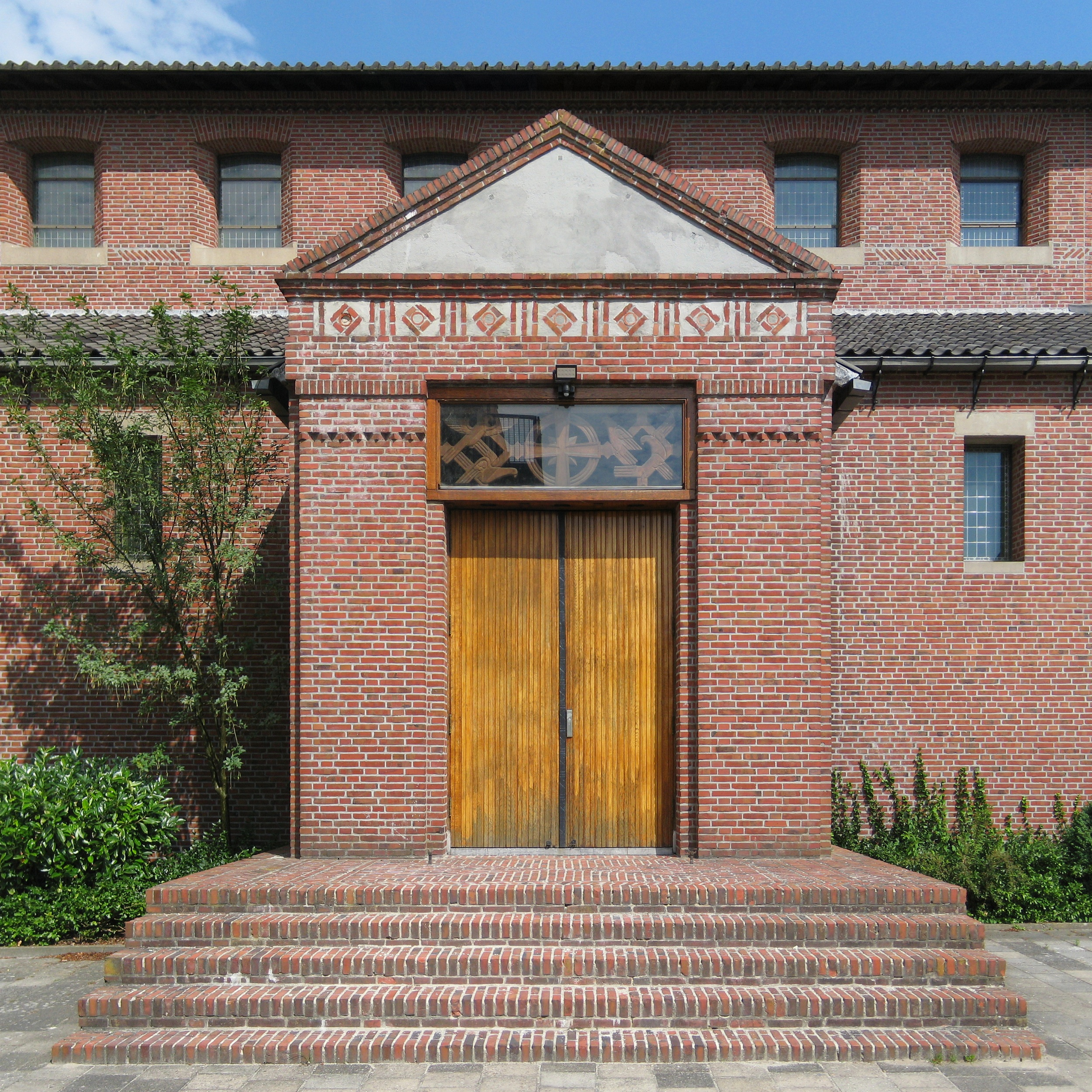
South entrance of the Church of the Saviour, Groningen

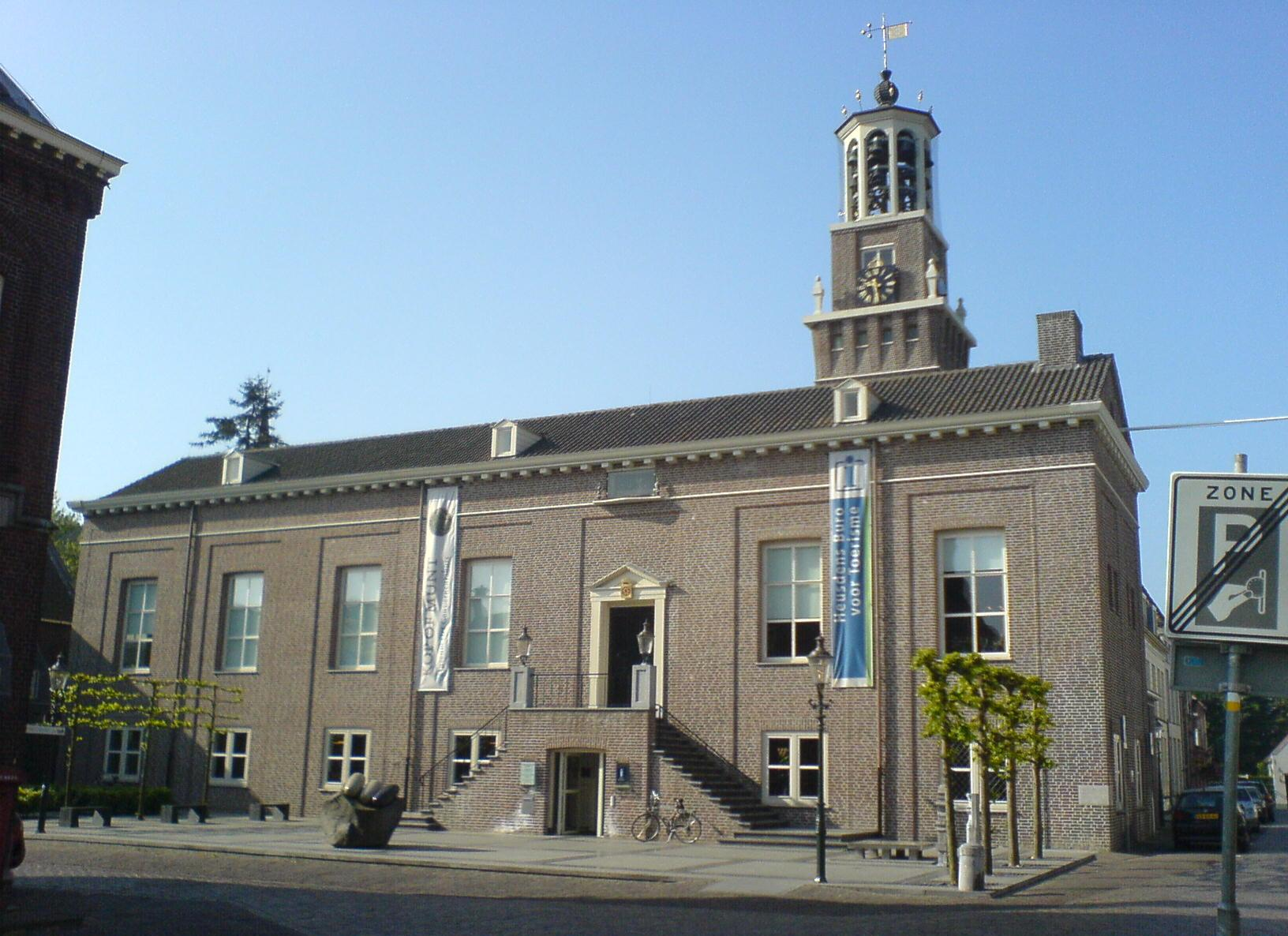
Town hall, Heusden

The Bossche School was a traditionalist movement in Dutch architecture which was strongly based on numerical relationships. It arose from the Delft School and was influential primarily on the design of Catholic churches.

The name of the movement came from the three-year Course in Ecclesiastical Architecture which was offered from 1946 to 1973 in the Kruithuis in 's-Hertogenbosch. The training was intended to guide architects during the post-war reconstruction of churches. The leaders were Dom Hans van der Laan, his brother Nico van der Laan and C. Pouderoyen.

== Features ==
A notable feature of the Bossche School is the sober design of the buildings. The proportions in particular were fixed by the so-called plastic number. The building materials used were principally brick, concrete and wood, that is to say, the materials that are easily available in the Netherlands, just as in Italy, for example, much use is made of marble.

Their churches are mostly three-part basilicas, modelled on Early Christian churches in Italy. The towers are also reminiscent of the campaniles of northern Italy. In the second half of the 20th century many churches, monasteries and houses were built in this style, predominantly in the south of the Netherlands. Because of falling church attendance, a large number of these buildings have been threatened with demolition, as happened for example St. Willibrord's Church in Almelo.

The Bossche School was the latest phase in the development of Dutch church architecture. Now, when new churches are built, to the extent that they still are, specialist architects are not necessarily required, and increasingly functional architecture is preferred.

== Examples ==
A good illustration of the principles of the School is provided by St. Benedictusberg Abbey near Vaals, where Hans van der Laan was responsible for the construction of the church, a crypt and atrium.

At Madurodam, a scale model of St. Martin's Church, Gennep, is given as an example of the Bossche School.

At Heusden, the town hall, which was destroyed in World War II by the occupying Germans, was rebuilt according to the principles of the Bossche School, although not necessarily to the general liking of the locals.

At Odiliapeel the "Kruisvindingskerk" ("Church of the Discovery of the Cross") by the architect Jan de Jong (1959) has been declared a locally protected monument by the municipality of Uden.

== Architects ==
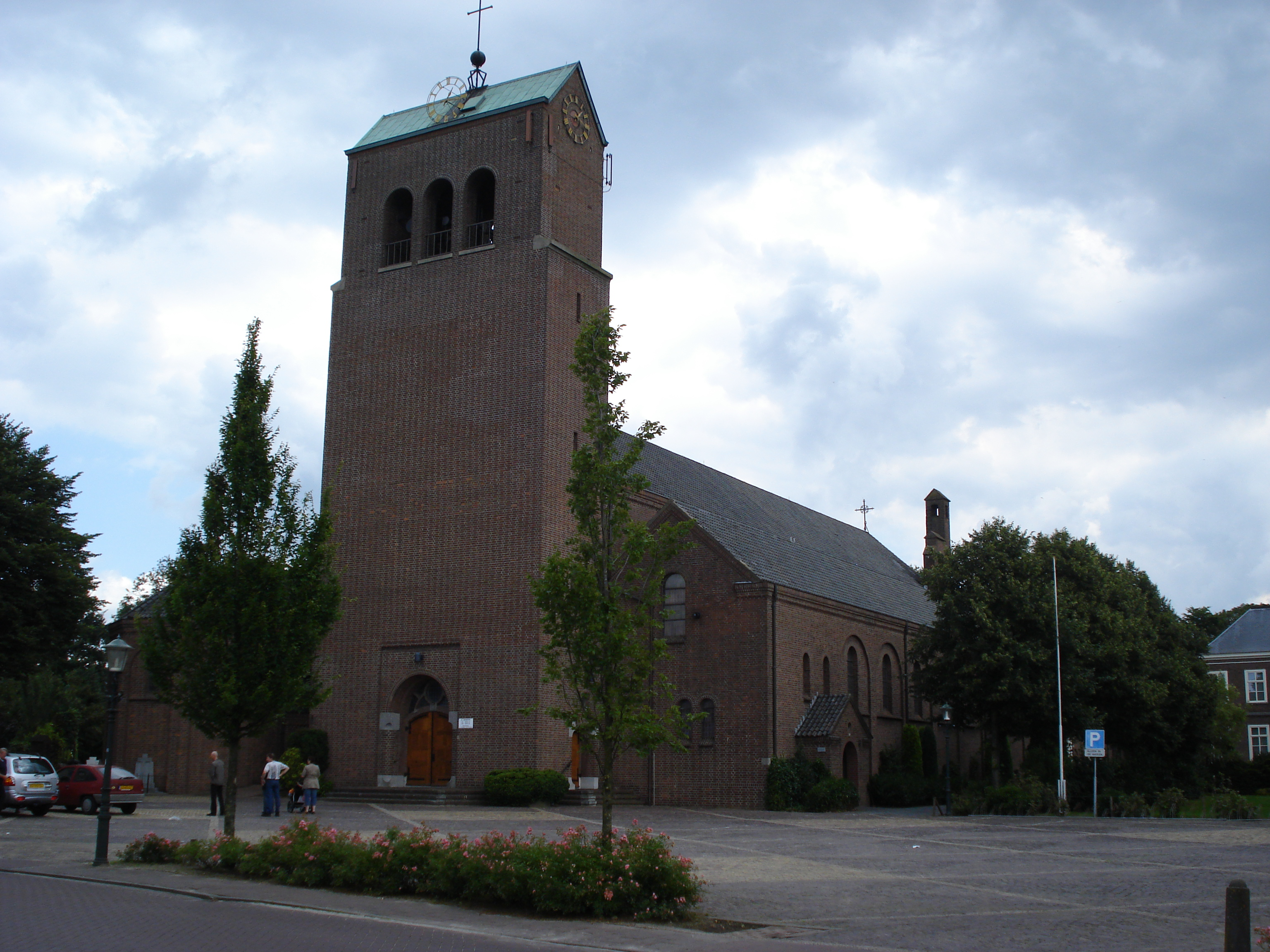
Sint-Jan's-Onthoofdingskerk in Nuland

Architects of the Bossche School included:

- Dom Hans van der Laan
- Jan de Jong
- Nico van der Laan
- Evers en Sarlemijn
- Gerard Wijnen
- Fons Vermeulen
- W.M. van Dael
- A.J.C. van Beurden
- C. Pouderoyen
- J. Magis
