= St Willibrord's Church =

St Willibrord's Church may refer to:

- St. Willibrord's Church, Utrecht, Netherlands
- St Willibrord's Church, Clayton, Greater Manchester, United Kingdom

== See also ==
- St. Willibrord's Abbey
