= Slangenburg Castle =

Dutch castle

- Kasteel Slangenburg
- Varsseveld / Doetinchem, The Netherlands
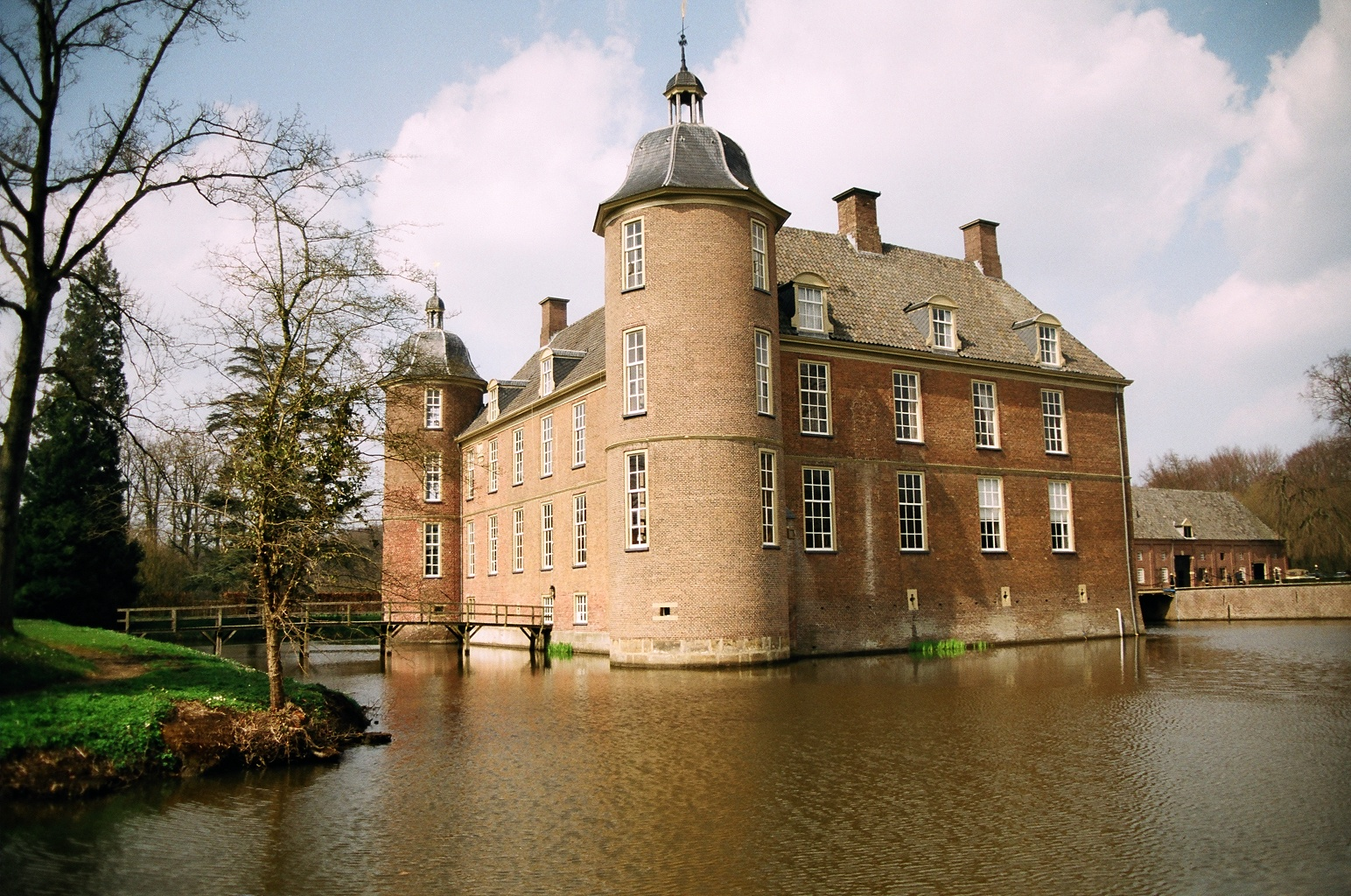
- Slangenburg Castle

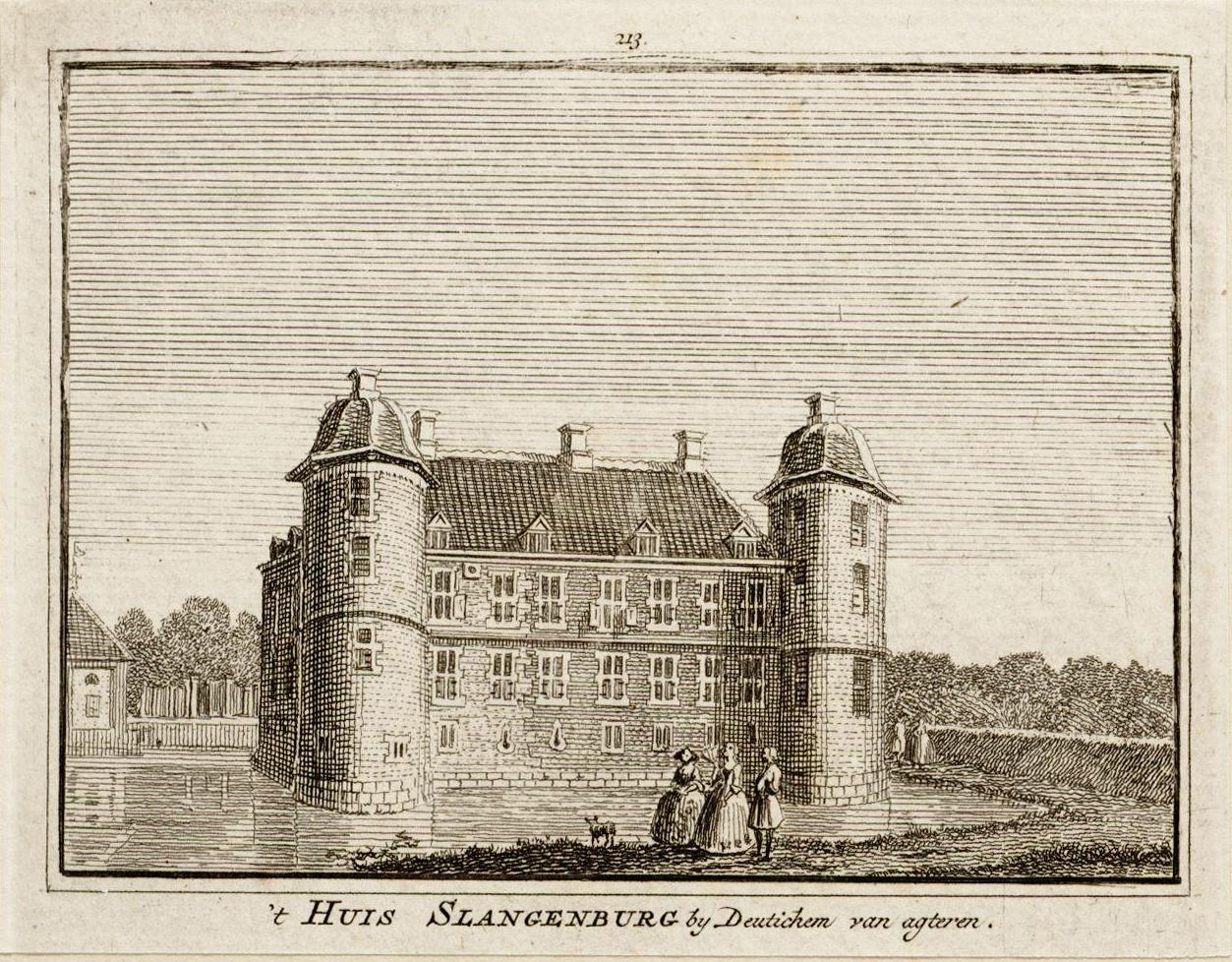
- Slangenburg Castle in an old print

Site information
- Type: Castle
- Owner: Dutch government
- Open to the public: Yes (partly)
- Condition: Good

Location
- The Netherlands
- Coordinates: 51°57′38″N 6°21′39″E

Site history
- Built: 1500
- Materials: Brick

Slangenburg Castle (Dutch: Kasteel Slangenburg) is a castle in the municipality of Doetinchem in the province of Gelderland in the Netherlands. The castle is located in the forest of the same name between the towns of Varsseveld and Doetinchem, about 5 kilometers from the latter.

Slangenburg Castle was constructed in the Late Medieval period. In the 17th century the castle became the property of General Frederik Johan van Baer, also known as General Slangenburg, who rebuilt it for residential purposes.

The last private owners were a German family called Passmann, who are buried in a private cemetery next to the moat. After World War II all German properties were confiscated by the Dutch government, who thus acquired the castle, which, with the surrounding terrain and the buildings within the outer moat, now forms part of the portfolio of the Rijksgebouwendienst ("State Buildings Service"), while the surrounding area falls under the care of the Dutch environmental agency, the Staatsbosbeheer.

At present the castle is used as a guesthouse by the nearby Benedictine monastery, St. Willibrord's Abbey (Sint-Willibrordabdij), a newly built structure of the 1950s situated on a part of the castle's former estate. The original monastic community, from Oosterhout Abbey, was initially accommodated in the castle itself in the years immediately following the war.

The estate and the monastery chapel are open to the public. The estate, roughly trapezoid in shape, features a system of lanes which is centuries old.

== Gallery ==
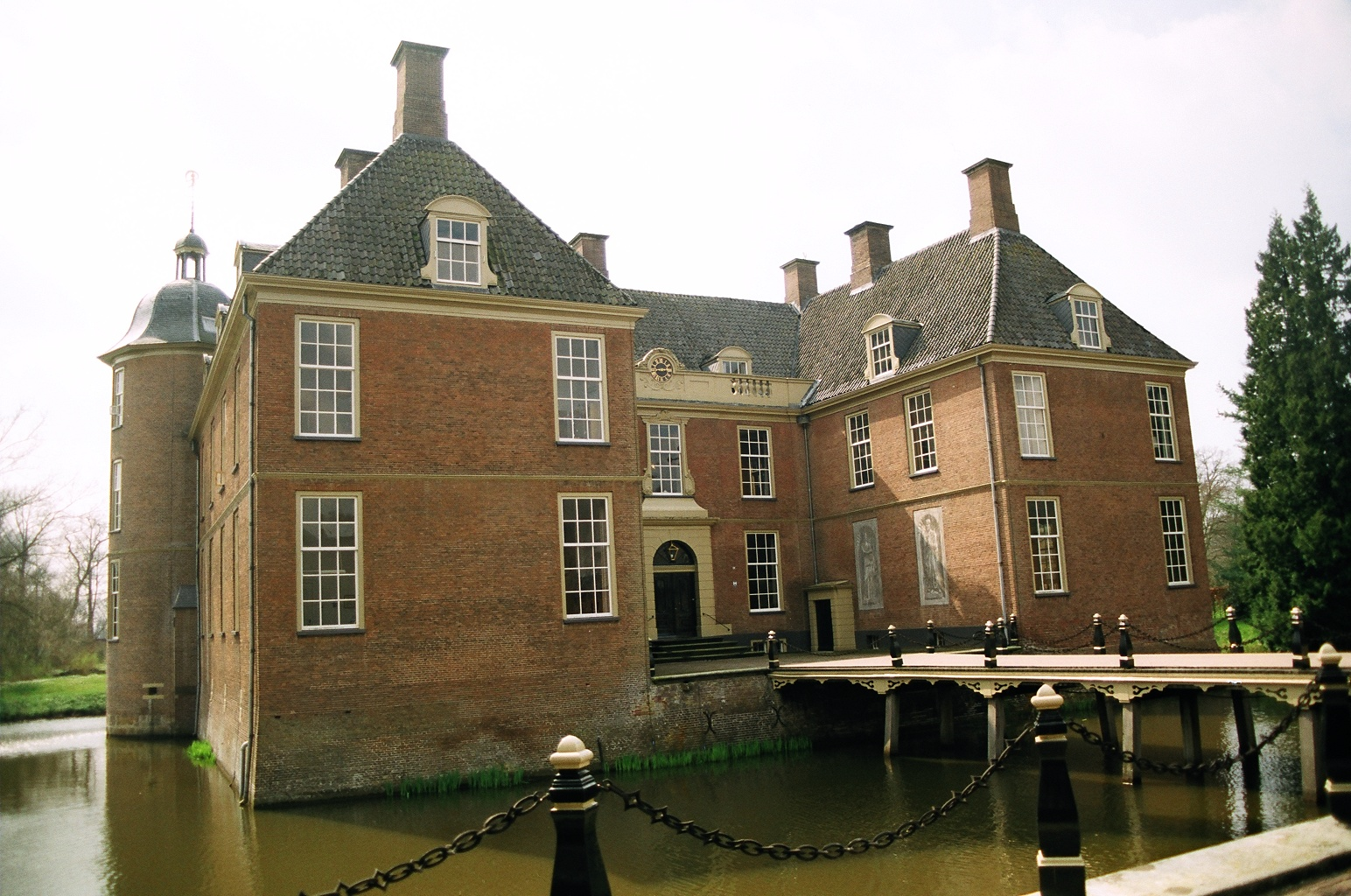
Entrance to the castle

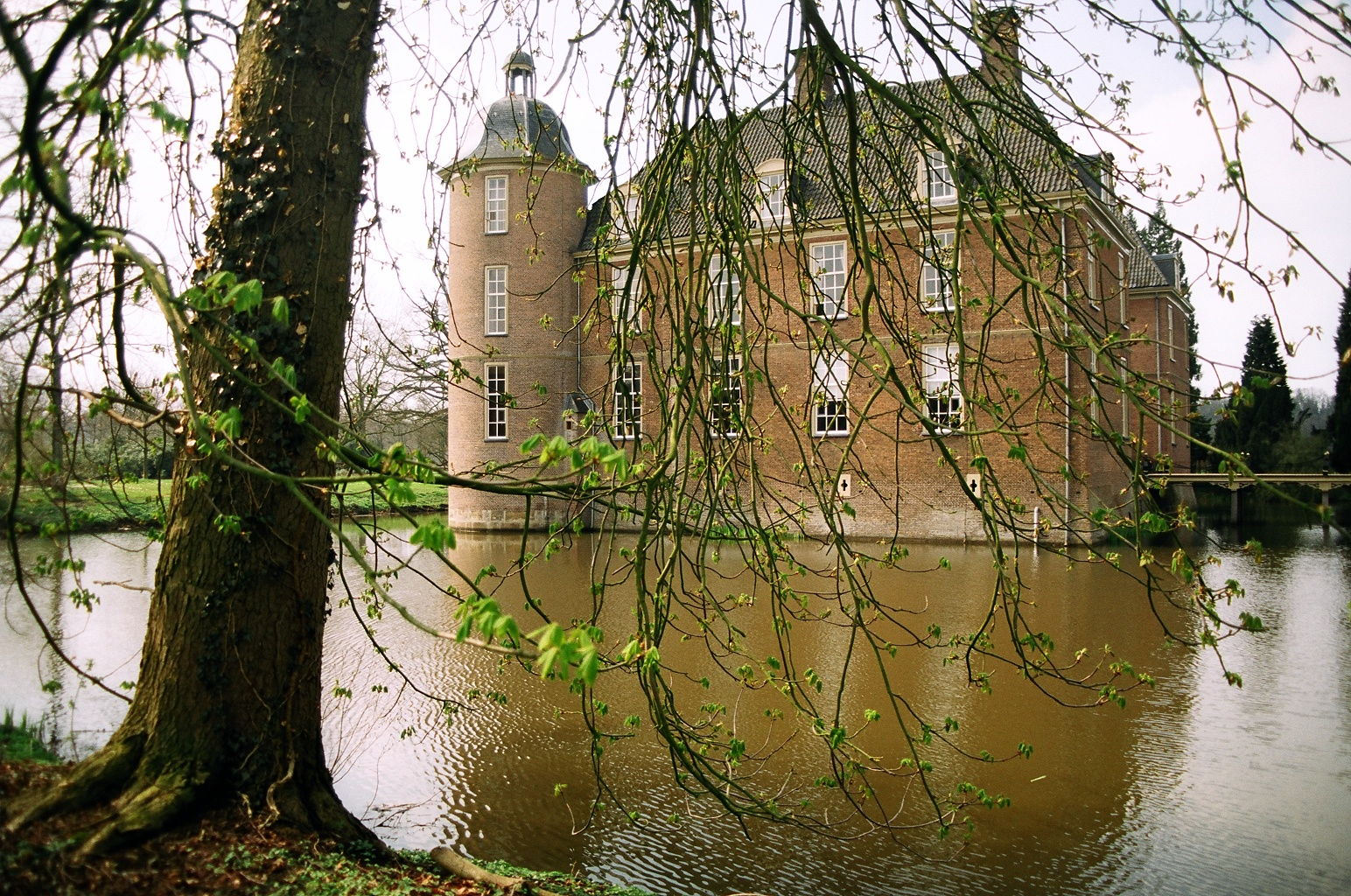
The castle over the moat

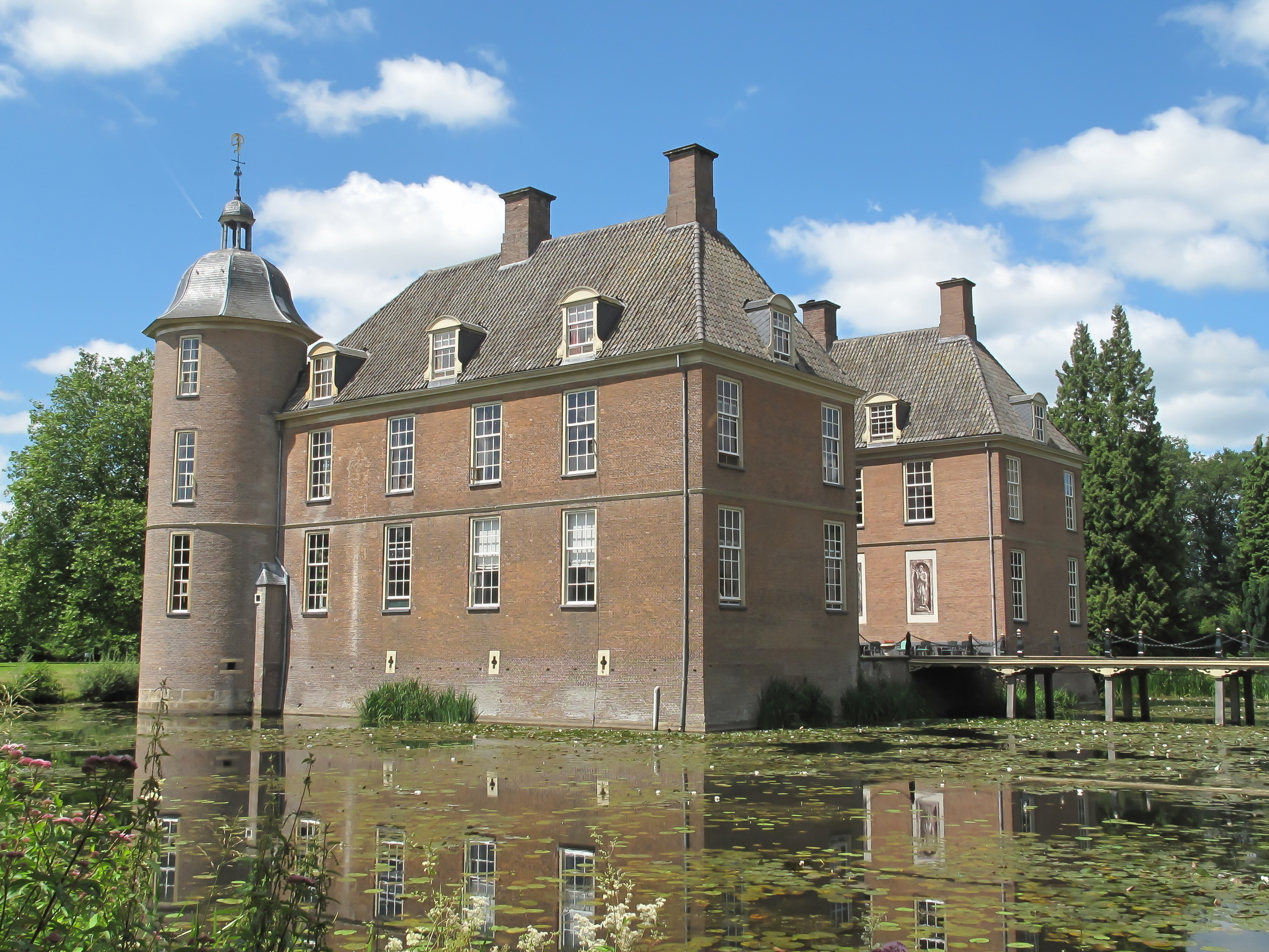
Outside view

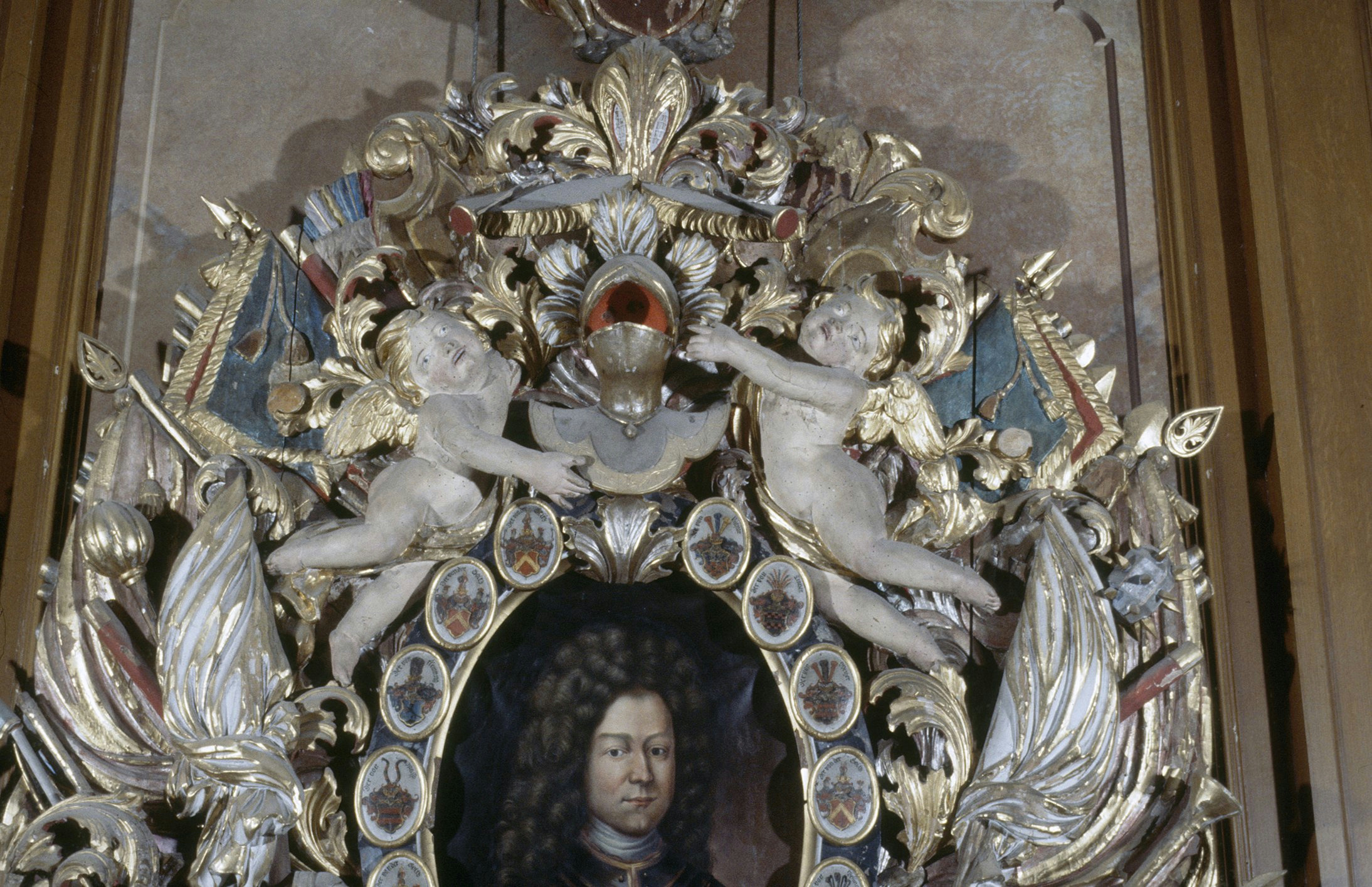
Detail of the interior

== See also ==
- List of castles in the Netherlands
