= Hans van der Laan =

Dutch architect (1904–1991)

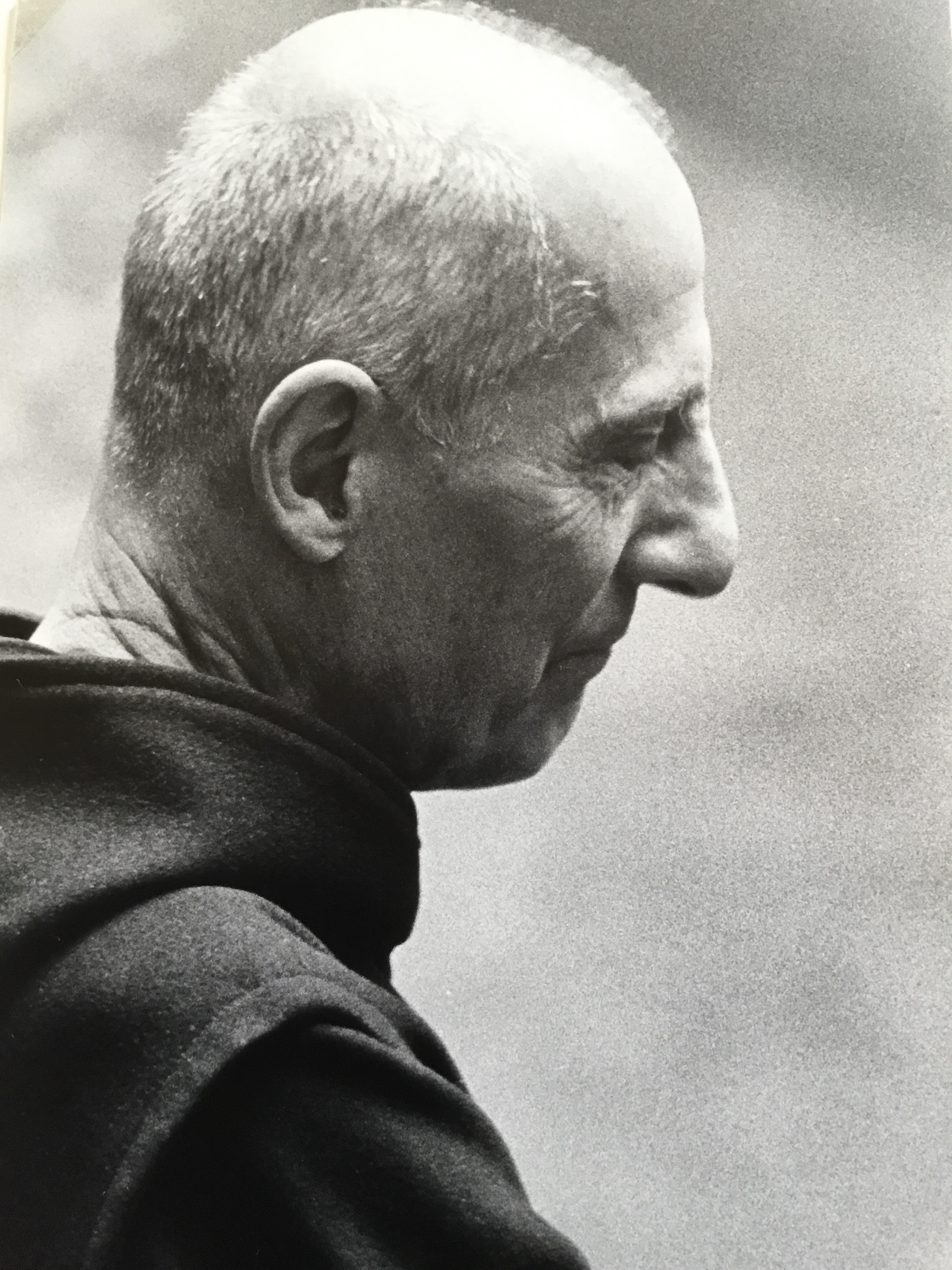
Hans van der Laan Portrait

Dom Hans van der Laan (29 December 1904 – 19 August 1991) was a Dutch Benedictine monk and architect.

He was a leading figure in the Bossche School. His theories on numerical ratios in architecture, in particular regarding the plastic ratio, were very influential. He may be regarded as intellectually related to the second generation of "De Groep".

== Early life ==
Van der Laan was the ninth of the eleven recorded children of Leiden architect Leo van der Laan (1864–1942) by his marriage to Anna Stadhouder (1871–1941). His brothers Jan van der Laan and Nico van der Laan also became architects. His teenage years were marred by a diagnosis of tuberculosis when he was seventeen. The illness also delayed the commencement of his university level studies, but he used a year in a sanatorium to study higher mathematics so that once he did resume his studies he was able to omit the mathematics based elements of the standard course.

Hans studied architecture from 1923 to 1926 at the Technische Hogeschool of Delft, where M.J. Granpré Molière was the dominant figure. Granpré Molière regarded his Catholic faith as inseparably bound up with architecture, a concept with which Van der Laan could not agree. He did not complete his course and in 1927 moved to St. Paul's Abbey, Oosterhout, to become a Benedictine monk. He was ordained into the priesthood in 1934. Later he lived in St. Benedictusberg Abbey at Mamelis near Vaals. As sacristan he developed a strong interest in the design of liturgical objects and church furnishings. His interest in architecture was also reawakened. He tried to find an answer to the question of which criteria the aesthetics of a building must meet, and developed a theory of numerical relationships in which the "plastic ratio", a three-dimensional expression of the golden ratio, played a central part.

After World War II Van der Laan, with his brother Nico, led a course in Church Architecture in the Kruithuis in 's-Hertogenbosch, using the early Christian basilica as an example, for training architects for the post-war reconstruction of Catholic churches and monasteries, and also of secular buildings. From these courses arose the Bossche School, a name given by opponents of the Van der Laan brothers and their followers. To illustrate his ideas about relationships he made use of two teaching aids developed by himself: the architectural abacus and the morphotheque, for two- and three-dimensional forms respectively.

Why we build houses

"Since the ground is too hard for our bare feet, we make sandals: for the sole of the sandal we use a material softer than the floor but harder than our feet. If the sandal soles were as hard as the floor or as soft as our feet they would be useless. But since they are just hard enough not to wear out too fast, and yet still soft enough to be comfortable, they provide a harmonious interface between our soft feet and the rough ground.

A house involves something more than the simple interface between our feet and the ground. It concerns the meeting between our whole being and the entire natural environment. Successfully achieving that meeting between the two is no more simply a matter for the small piece of softened ground that we wear on our feet, but a 'piece of habitable space', which we can separate from the natural environment with walls."

Hans van der Laan in "De architectonische ruimte" (1977)

== Works ==
Van der Laan designed only a few buildings, mostly Christian, not all of which were realised. In Helmond he built with his brother the octagonal St. Joseph's Chapel (1948). The church of St. Benedictusberg Abbey (1967) at Mamelis (near Vaals) is his best-known executed work. His design for the library of the same monastery was awarded the Limburg Architecture Prize in 1989. The crypt, the sacristy and a courtyard or atrium there were also designed by him. (The rest of the premises date from the 1920s and are not by him).

In Belgium he built Roosenberg Abbey at Waasmunster (Sisters of Mary, 1975), as well as the mother house in the same place (from 1978), and the church of the Immaculate Heart of Mary ("Onbevlekt Hart van Maria") in Wijnberg in Wevelgem. In Best a house with a patio was built to his designs (Naalden House, 1981). The last work to be executed from his designs was the monastery of the Benedictine nuns of Tomelilla in southern Sweden (largely finished in 1995).

One of the earliest works of the Dutch artist group the Observatorium was based on his work.

=== List ===
- St. Salvator's Chapel in Baarle-Nassau, 1929-1930
- Guest wing of the Benedictine nunnery in Oosterhout, 1938
- St. Joseph's Chapel in Helmond, 1948
- St. Benedictusberg Abbey in Mamelis in Vaals, 1956–1968
- Onbevlekt Hart van Maria in Wijnberg in Wevelgem, Belgium, 1963-1969
- Roosenberg Abbey in Waasmunster, Belgium, 1972–1974
- Jos Naalden House in Best, 1972–1982
- Bethlehem Church in Breda, 1977–1979
- Benedictine monastery in Tomelilla, Sweden, 1986–1991
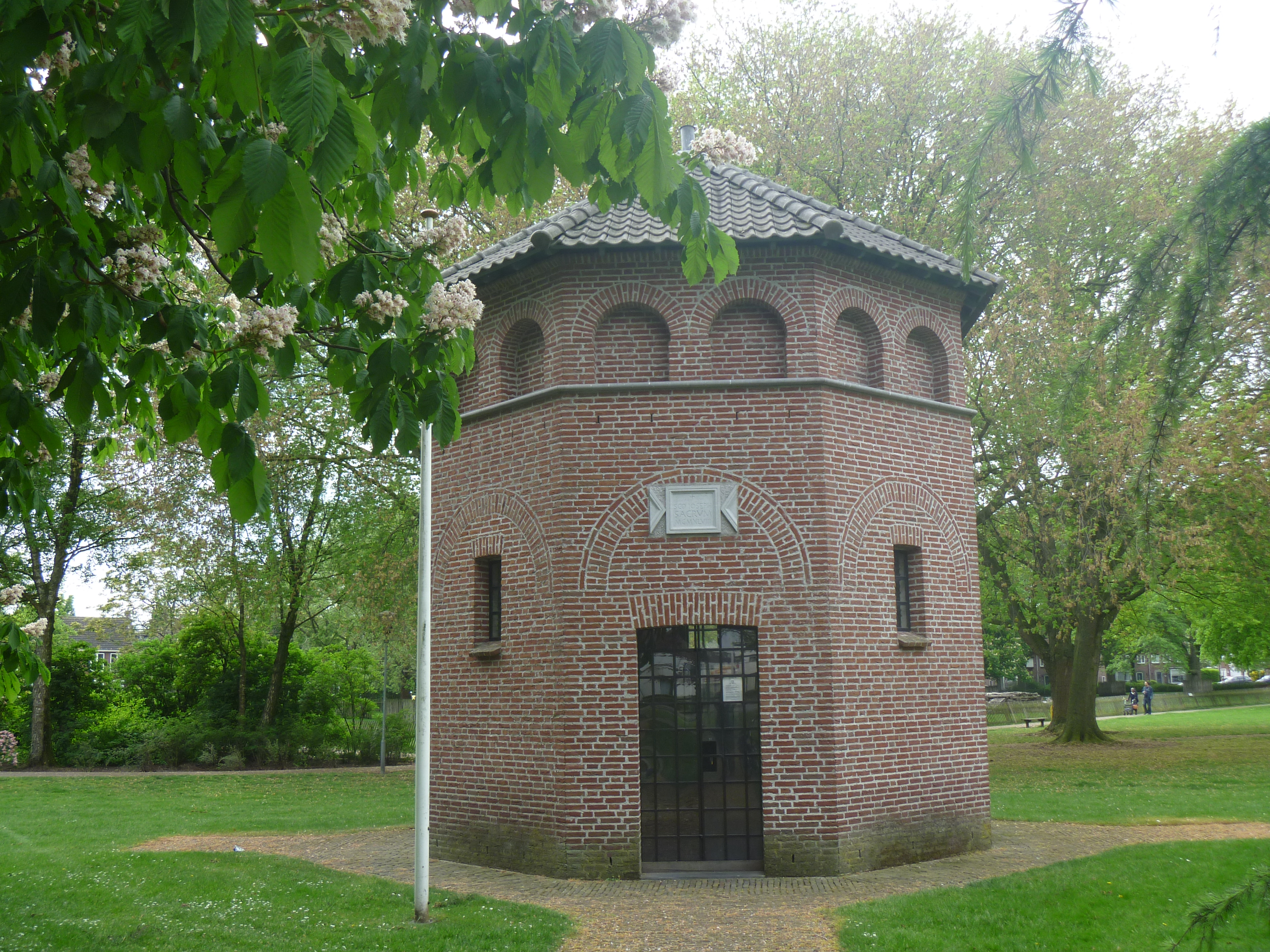
St. Joseph's Memorial Chapel, Helmond (1948)

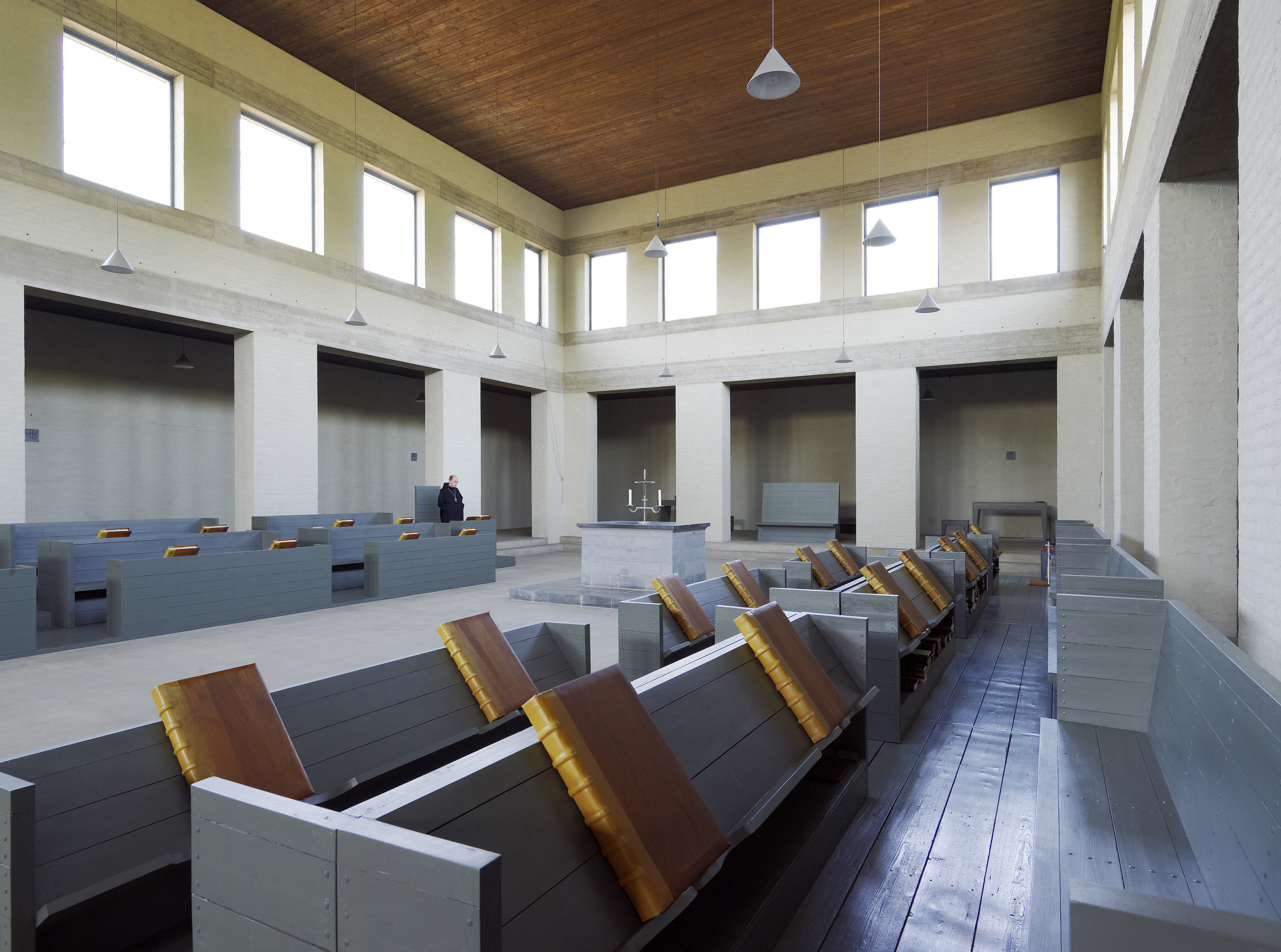
Church of St. Benedictusberg Abbey, Mamelis in Vaals (1967)

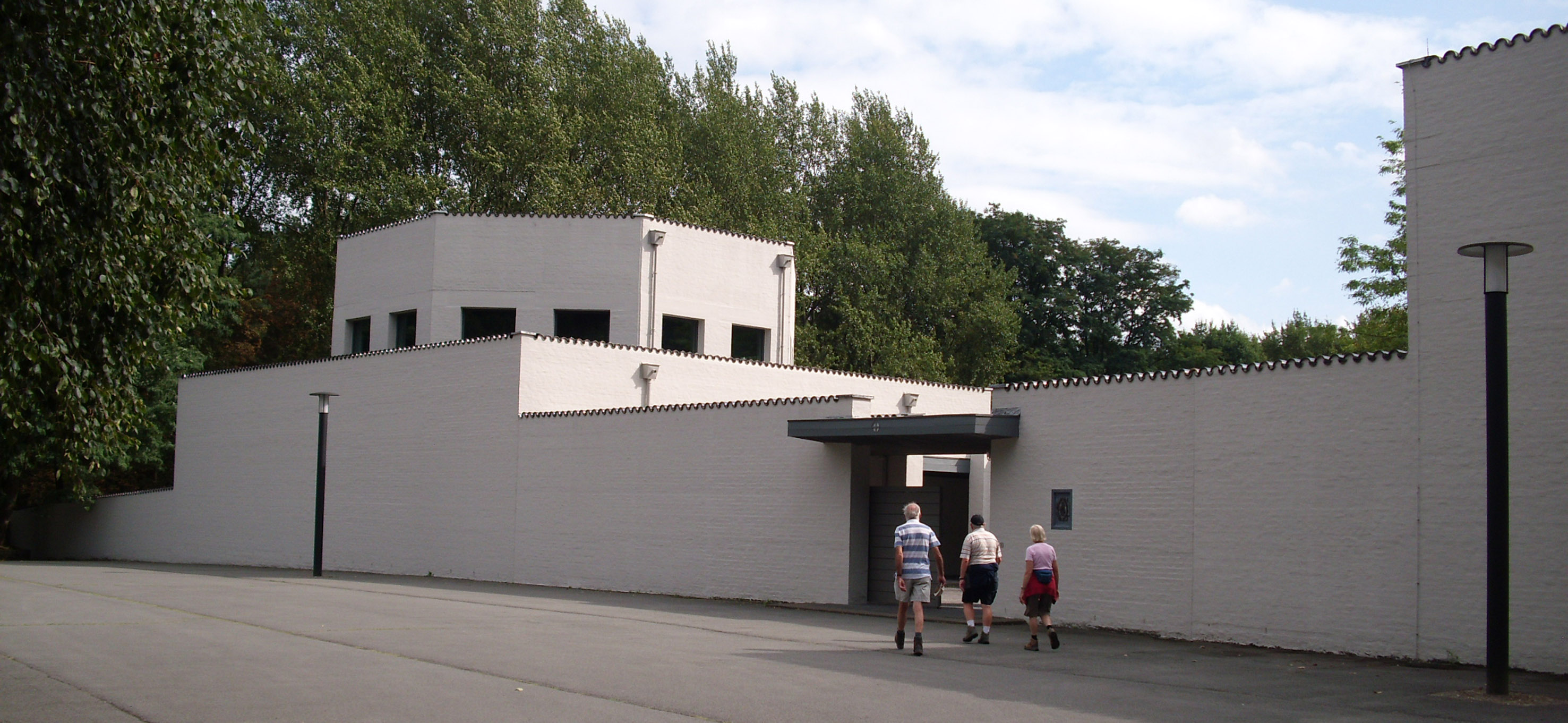
Roosenberg Abbey, Waasmunster (1975)

He also designed the furniture and fittings for his buildings.

=== Theoretical works ===
- Het plastisch getal. Brill, Leiden 1967
- De architectonische ruimte. Brill, Leiden 1977 (also available in English as: "Architectonic Space" Brill, Leiden, Netherlands, ISBN 9789004069435.)
- Het vormenspel der liturgie. Brill, Leiden 1985 (also available in English as: "The Play of Forms",ISBN 978-9004146334.)

== Bibliography ==
- Ferlenga, Alberto: Dom Hans van der Laan – Works and Words, Architectura & Natura, 2011, ISBN 978-94-6140-019-2
- Ferlenga, Alberto; Verde, Paola: Dom Hans van der Laan – works and words, Architectura & Natura, 2001
- Padovan, Richard: Dom Hans van der Laan – modern primitive, Architectura & Natura, 1994
- Remery, Michael, 2010: Mystery and Matter: On the Relationship Between Liturgy and Architecture in the Thought of Dom Hans van der Laan OSB (1904-1991) (Studies in Religion and the Arts vol. 3). Brill ISSN 1877-3192 ISBN 9004182969
- Voet, Caroline: Between the Lines and its Margins. Spatial Systematics in the work of Dom Hans van der Laan (1904-1991). (Dissertation) KU Leuven, Arenberg doctoral school of science, engineering & technology, 2013. ISBN 978-94-6018-706-3 Abstract online (table of contents)
- Voet, Caroline: "Dom Hans van der Laan. Tomelilla", Architectura & Natura, Amsterdam 2016.
