= Observatorium (artist collective) =

Artist collective

Anton Mauve
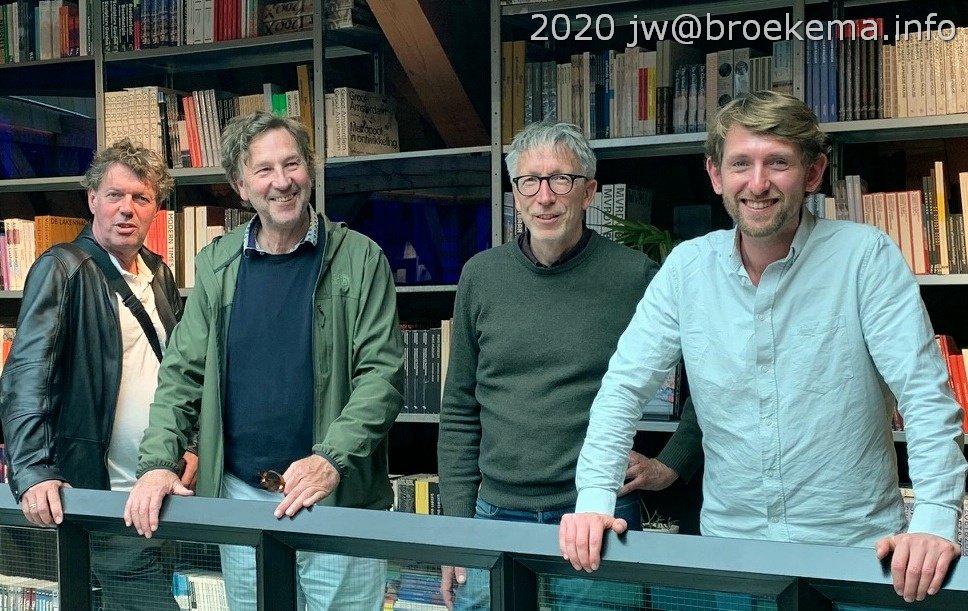
- Geert van de Camp, André Dekker, Lieven Poutsma and Ruud Reutelingsperger
- Born: 1997 (age 28–29); Rotterdam, Netherlands
- Known for: Conceptual art, environmental art
- Movement: Conceptual art
- Awards: Dutch Design Award (nomination)
- Website: https://www.observatorium.org/

The Observatorium is a Dutch artist collective based in Rotterdam and specialized in conceptual art, environmental art and architecture. It was founded by Geert van de Camp (sculptor and installation artist), André Dekker (conceptual artist) and Ruud Reutelingsperger (painter). In the late 2000s the interior architect Lieven Poutsma joined the group. They regularly work with specialists and other stakeholders on a project basis.

== History ==
In the mid-1990s, the founders of Observatorium started jointly designing residential structures, abstract spaces in which artists and other interested parties were invited to briefly observe and reflect. The first spaces were realized in galleries in Düsseldorf (1994), Groningen (1995), Rotterdam (1995) and The Hague, 1996.

In 1997, the first outdoor residential structure was realized on New York's Staten Island. The abstract structure was based on specific dimensions by the architect Hans van der Laan. This structure was resurrected a year later, in 1998, in the middle of a meadow in the Hoeksche Waard.

From the beginning of the new millennium, the Observatorium has designed permanent sculptures in public space, such as the Nieuw-Terbregge Observatory in 2001 and the Zandwacht on Maasvlakte 2 in 2015. The collective is involved in studies, competitions, lectures and other publications.

They have received various awards, including nominations for the Dutch Design Award in 2009 and 2011.

== Work ==
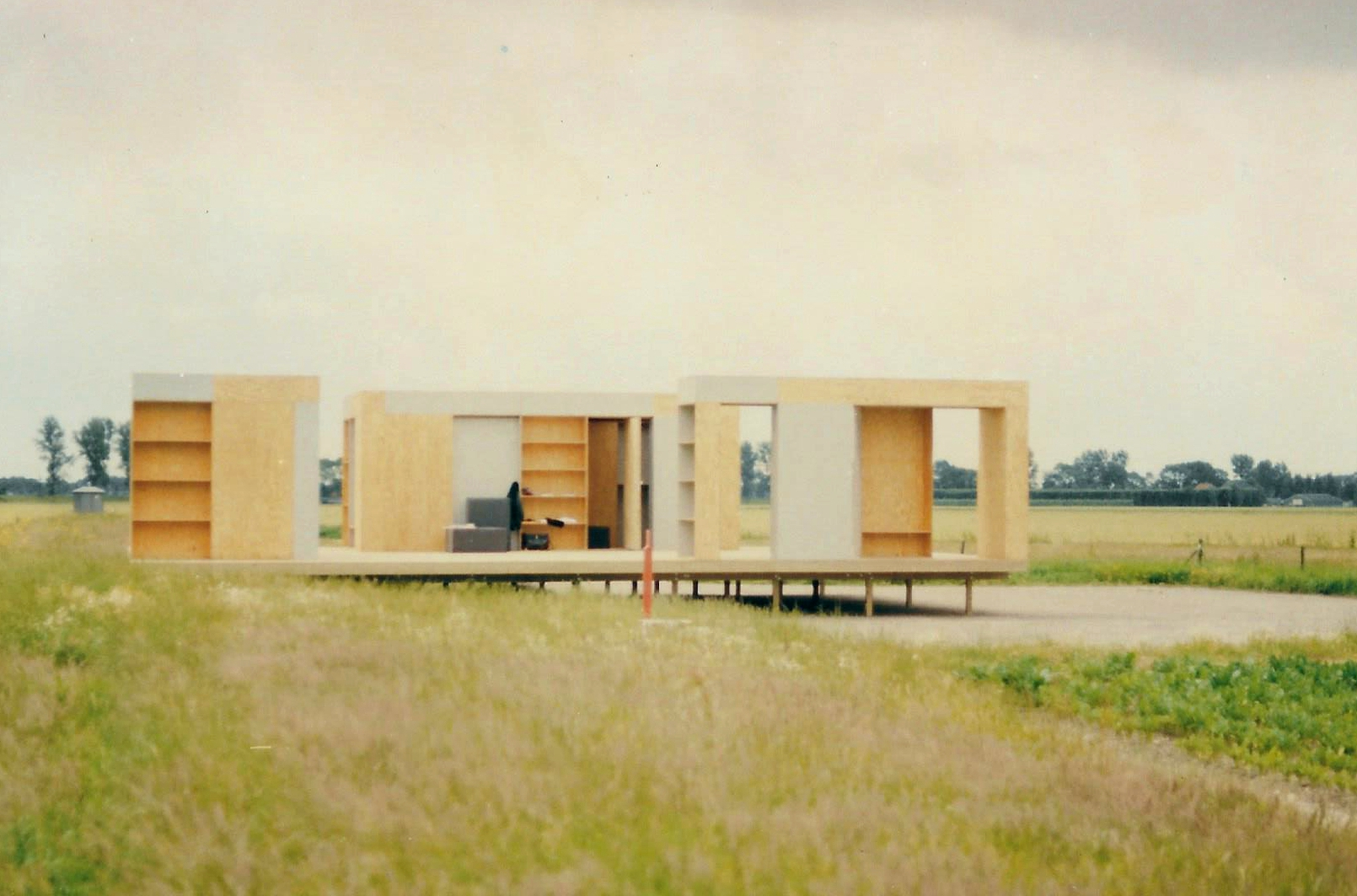
Observatorium Hoeksche Waard, 1998

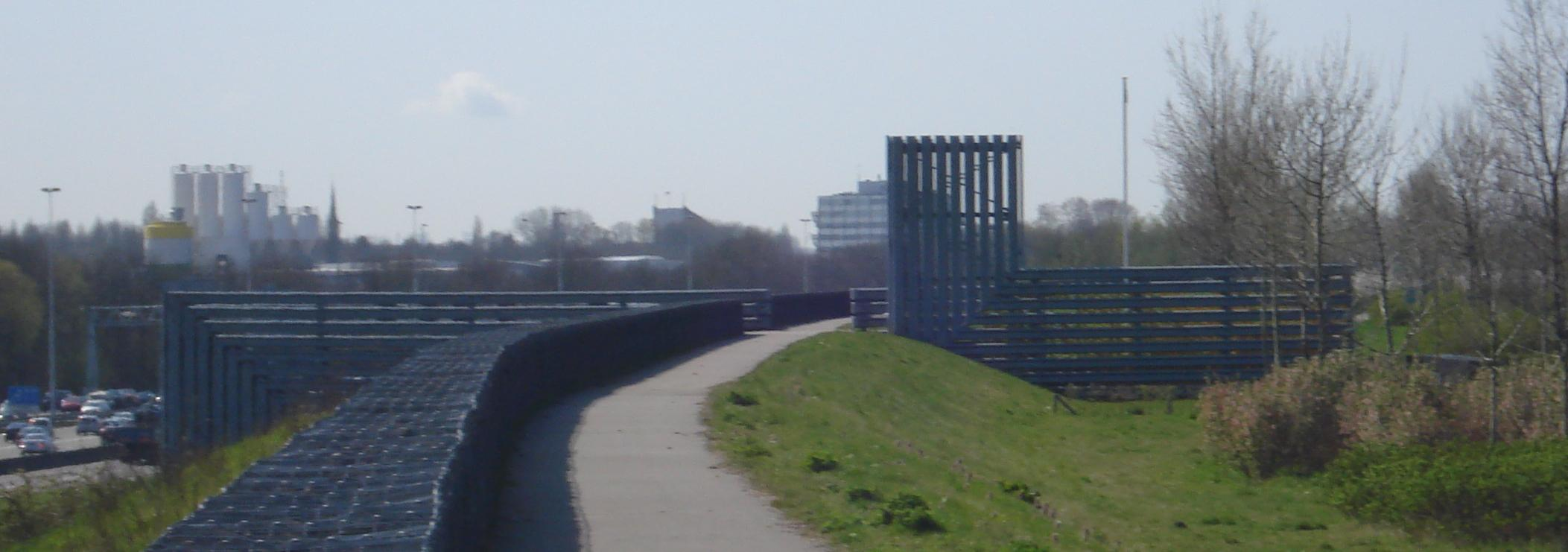
Observatorium Nieuw-Terbregge, Rotterdam 2001

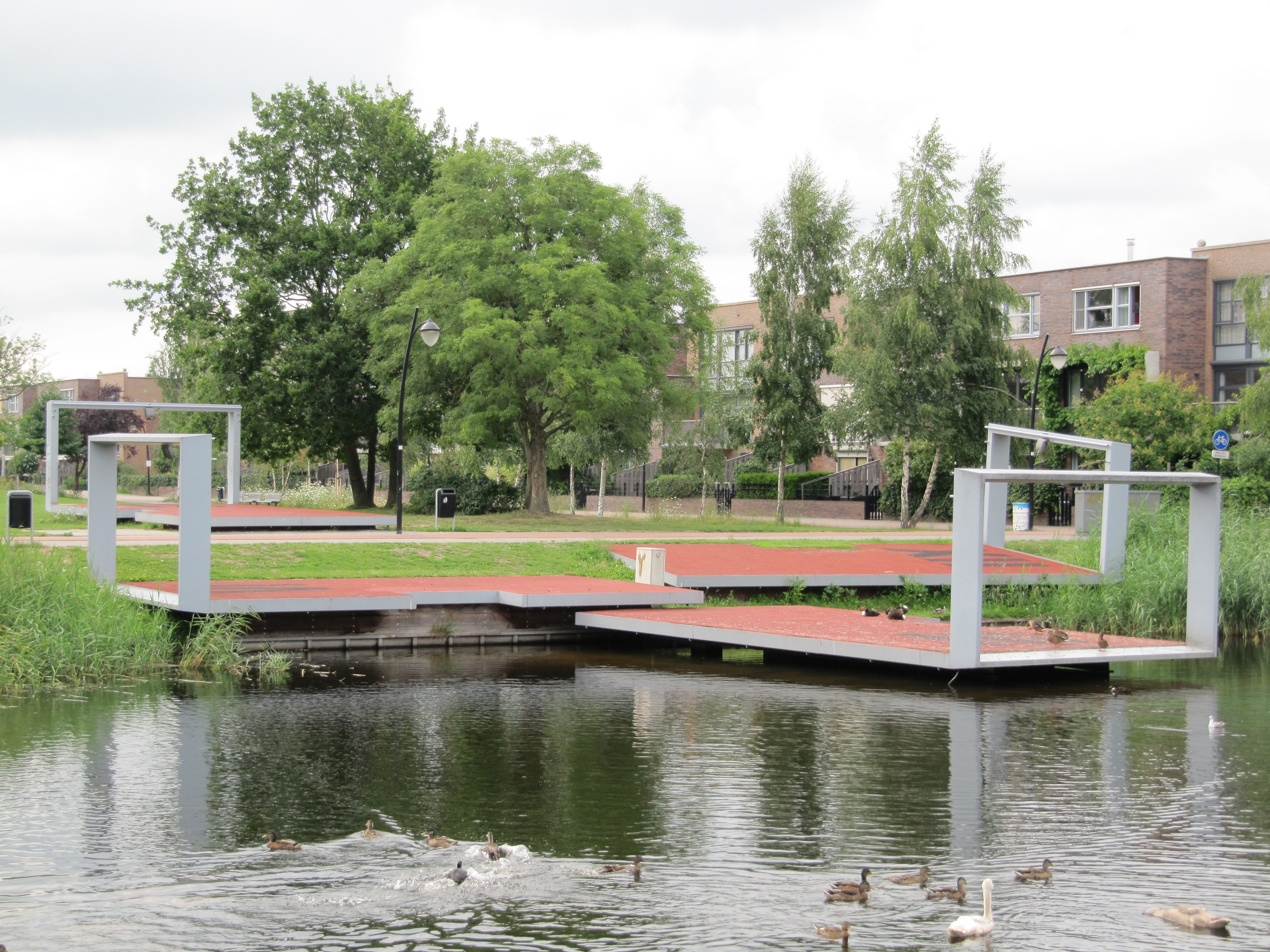
Podium der Tijden, Amersfoort 2010

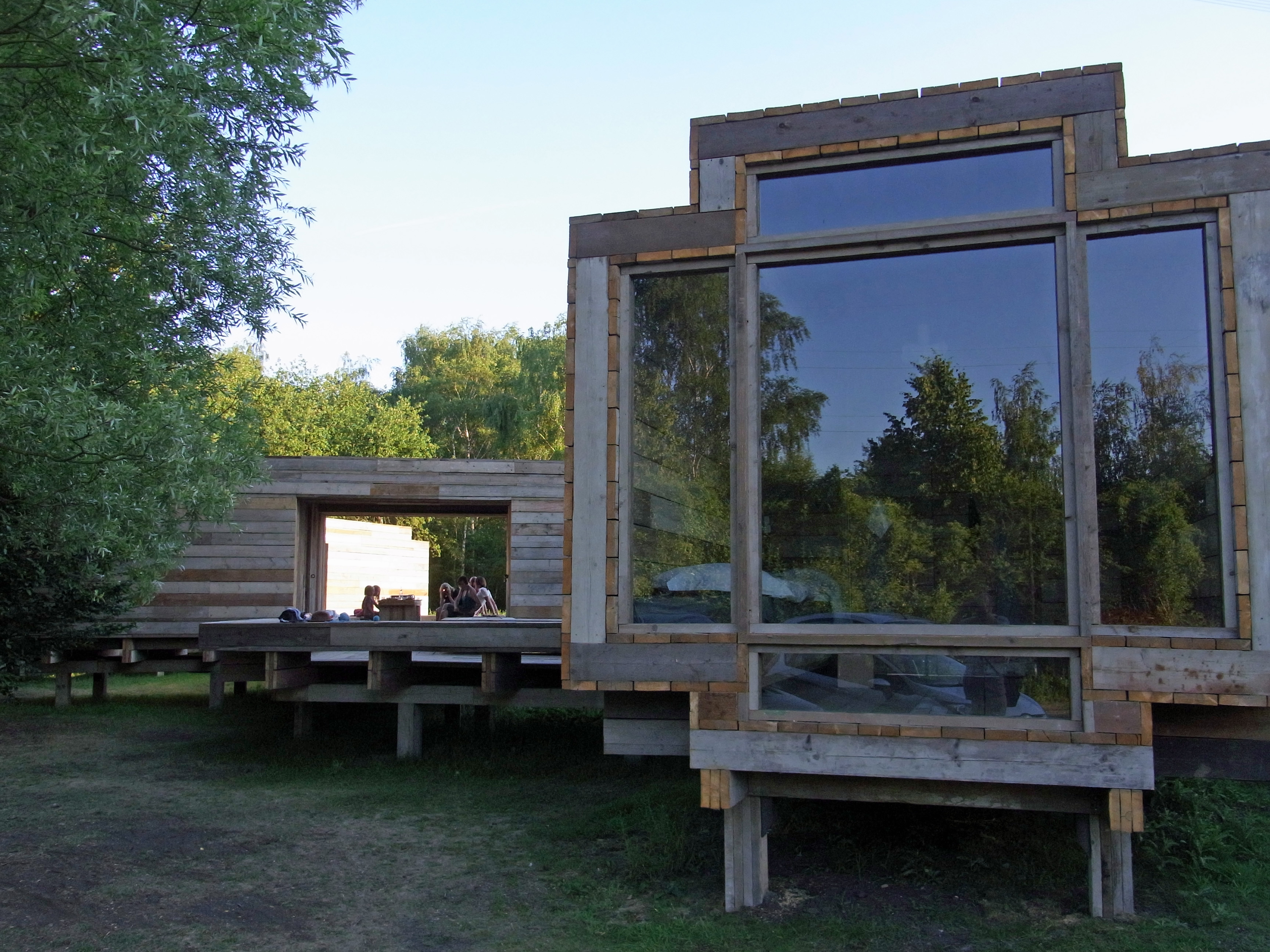
Warten auf den Fluss, Essen 2010

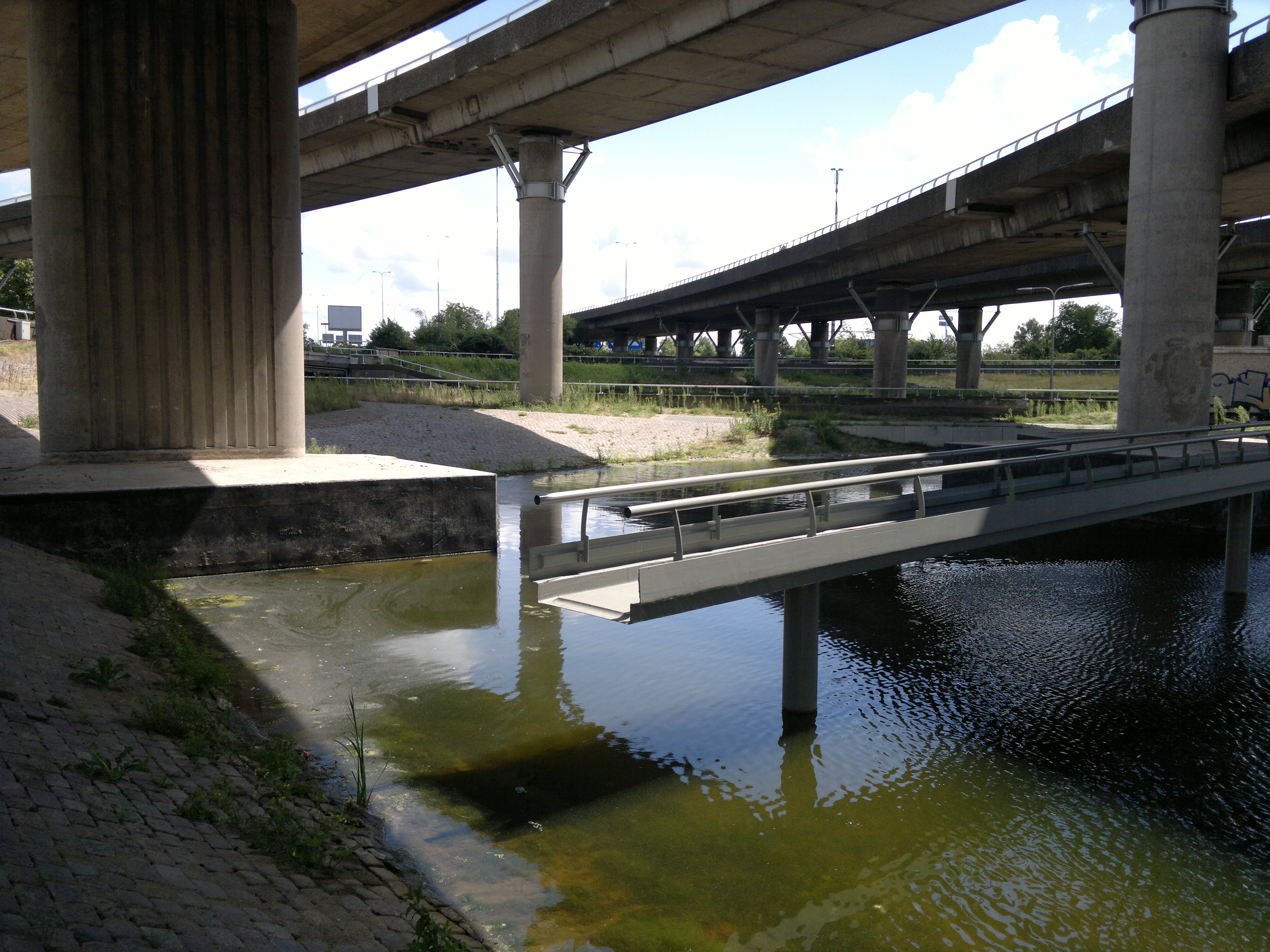
Sculpture knooppunt Kleinpolderplein, 2012

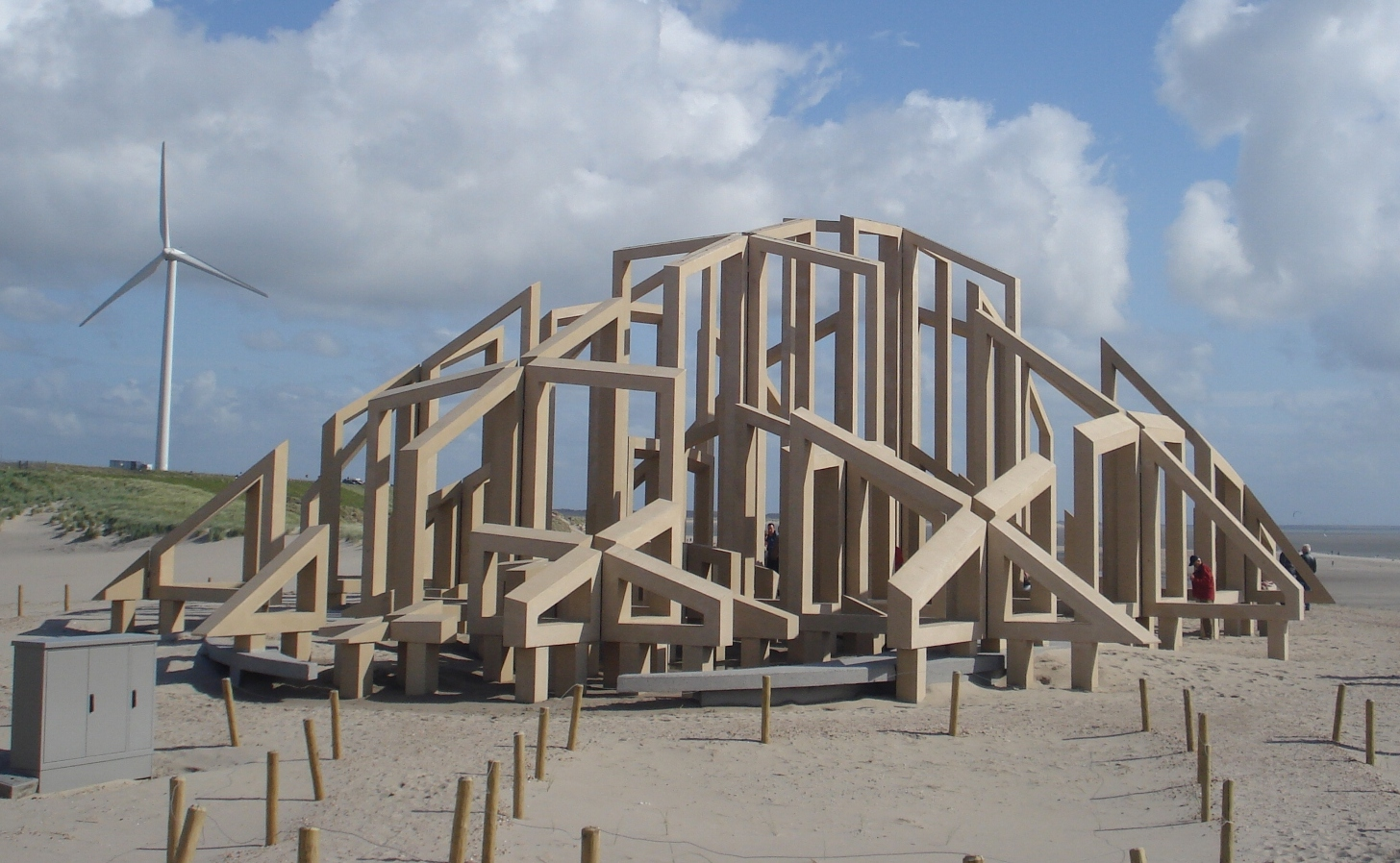
Zandwacht, 2e Maasvlakte, 2015

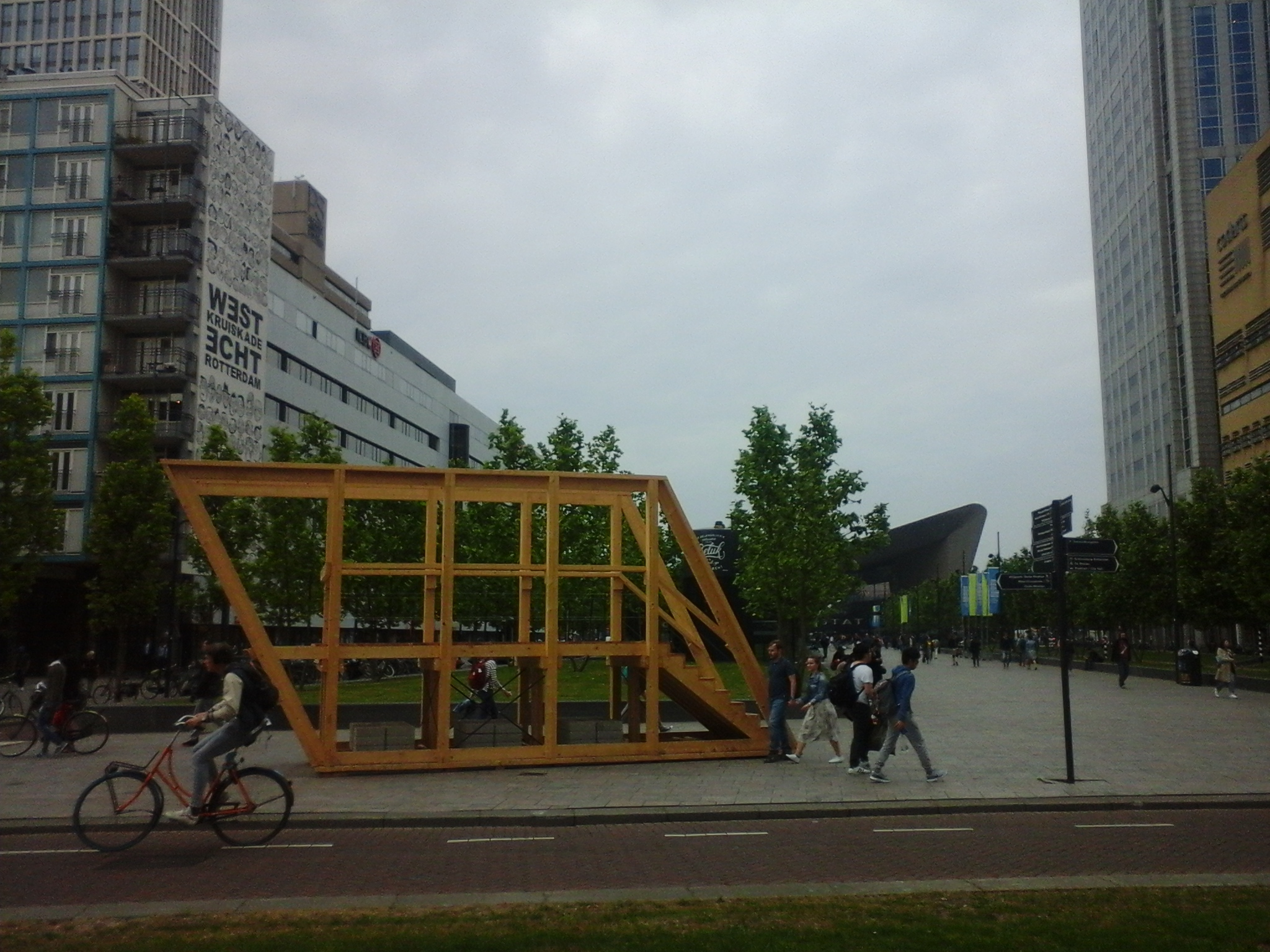
Rotterdamse Straatkijkers, 2018

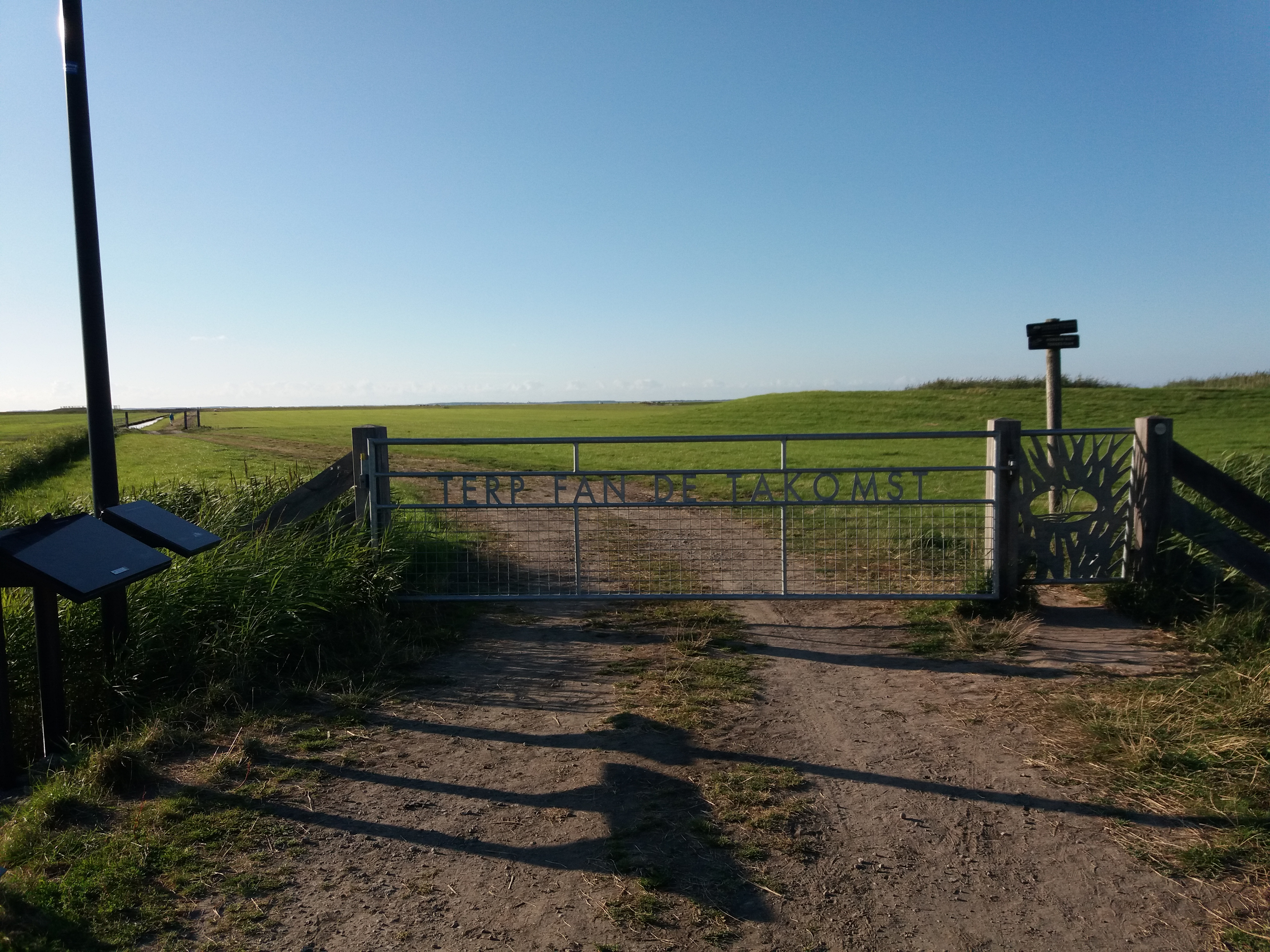
Terp fan de Takomst, 2020

== Publications, selection ==
- Andre Dekker, Observatory, Geert van de Camp, Big Pieces of Time, 2010.
- Observatory. The Green Shadow, 2016.
- Observatory. Zollverein: Park - Dust, Silent Spectacle. 2017.
- :Geert van de Camp, Andre Dekker, Lieven Poutsma, Ruud Reutelingsperger. Public Art for Public Life. Learnings from Observatorium. Rotterdam: nai010, 2022.
