= Odiliapeel =

- Village
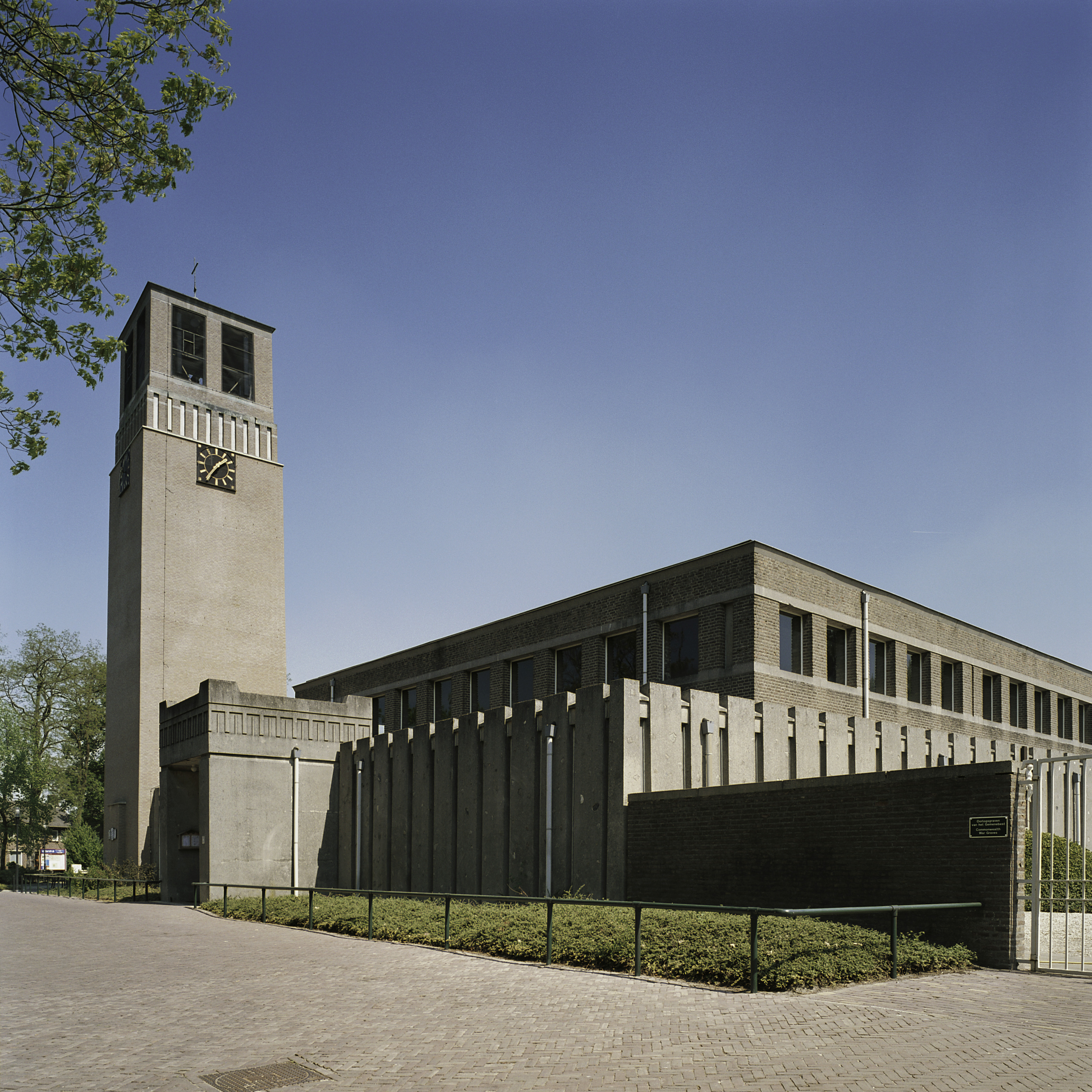
- Kruisvindingskerk

- Location in the province of North Brabant in the Netherlands Odiliapeel (Netherlands)
- Coordinates: 51°38′40″N 5°42′20″E
- Country: Netherlands
- Province: North Brabant
- Municipality: Maashorst
- Established: 1921

Area
  - Total: 14.38 km^{2} (5.55 sq mi)
- Elevation: 22 m (72 ft)

Population (2021)
  - Total: 2,045
  - Density: 142.2/km^{2} (368.3/sq mi)
- Time zone: UTC+1 (CET)
  - Summer (DST): UTC+2 (CEST)
- Postal code: 5409
- Dialing code: 0413

Odiliapeel (Brabantian: De Piejel) is a village in the Netherlands. It is situated in the northeast corner of the province of North Brabant, south of Volkel Air Base. It used to be part of the municipality of Uden, but merged into the municipality of Maashorst in 2022.

Odiliapeel was founded in 1921 as a peat excavation settlement. On 5 May 1930, it was officially named Odiliapeel, and is a combination of Odilia of Cologne and the region Peel. The initial excavation of the area started in 1908, however, a government subsidy plan led to the systematic exploration of the area. The village was designed by Heidemij (nowadays: Arcadis).

The Catholic Kruisvindingskerk was built between 1958 and 1959 in the style of the Bossche School as an aisleless church and a massive tower attached to the side of the church.

== Gallery ==
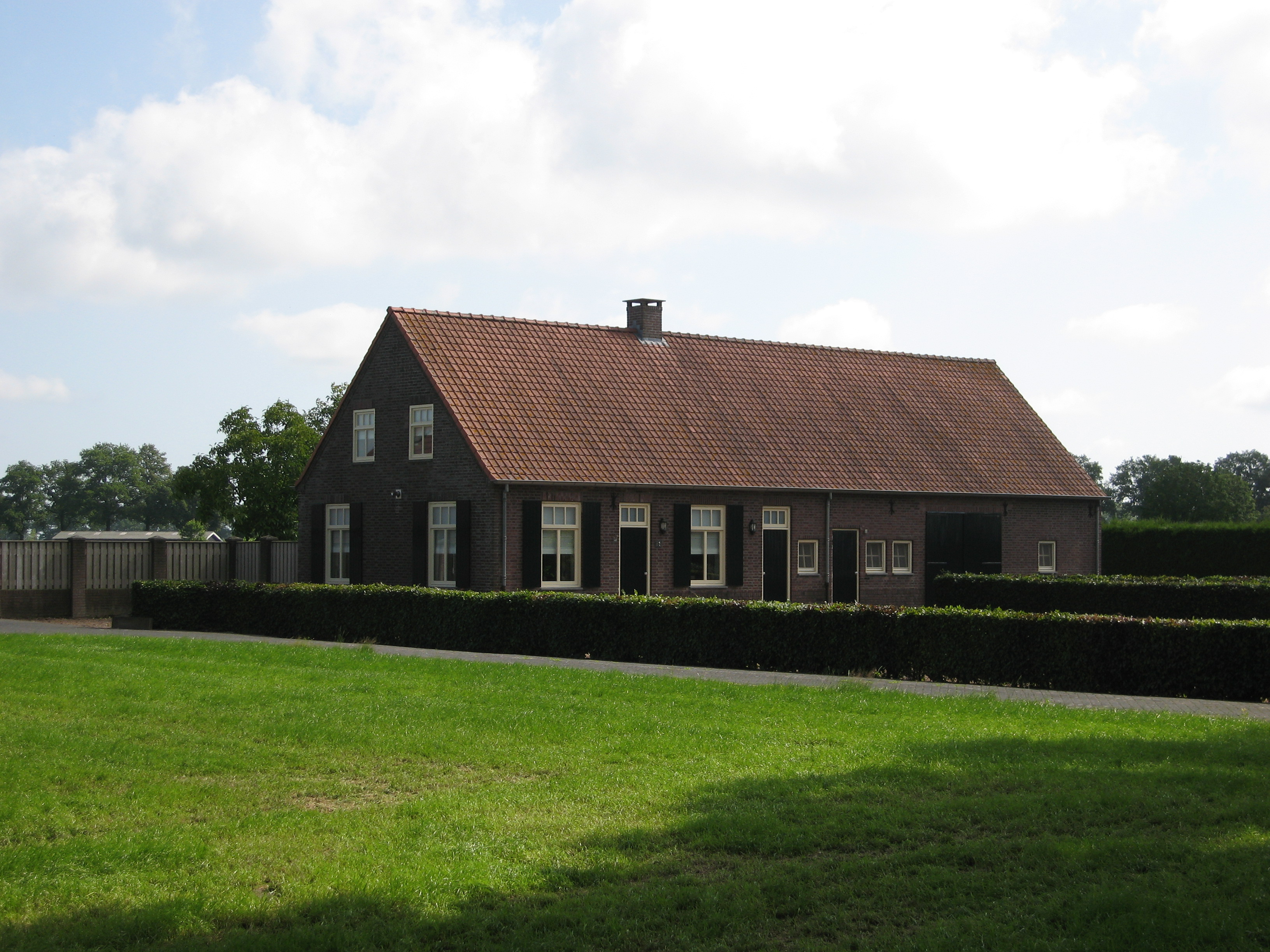
Farm in Odiliapeel

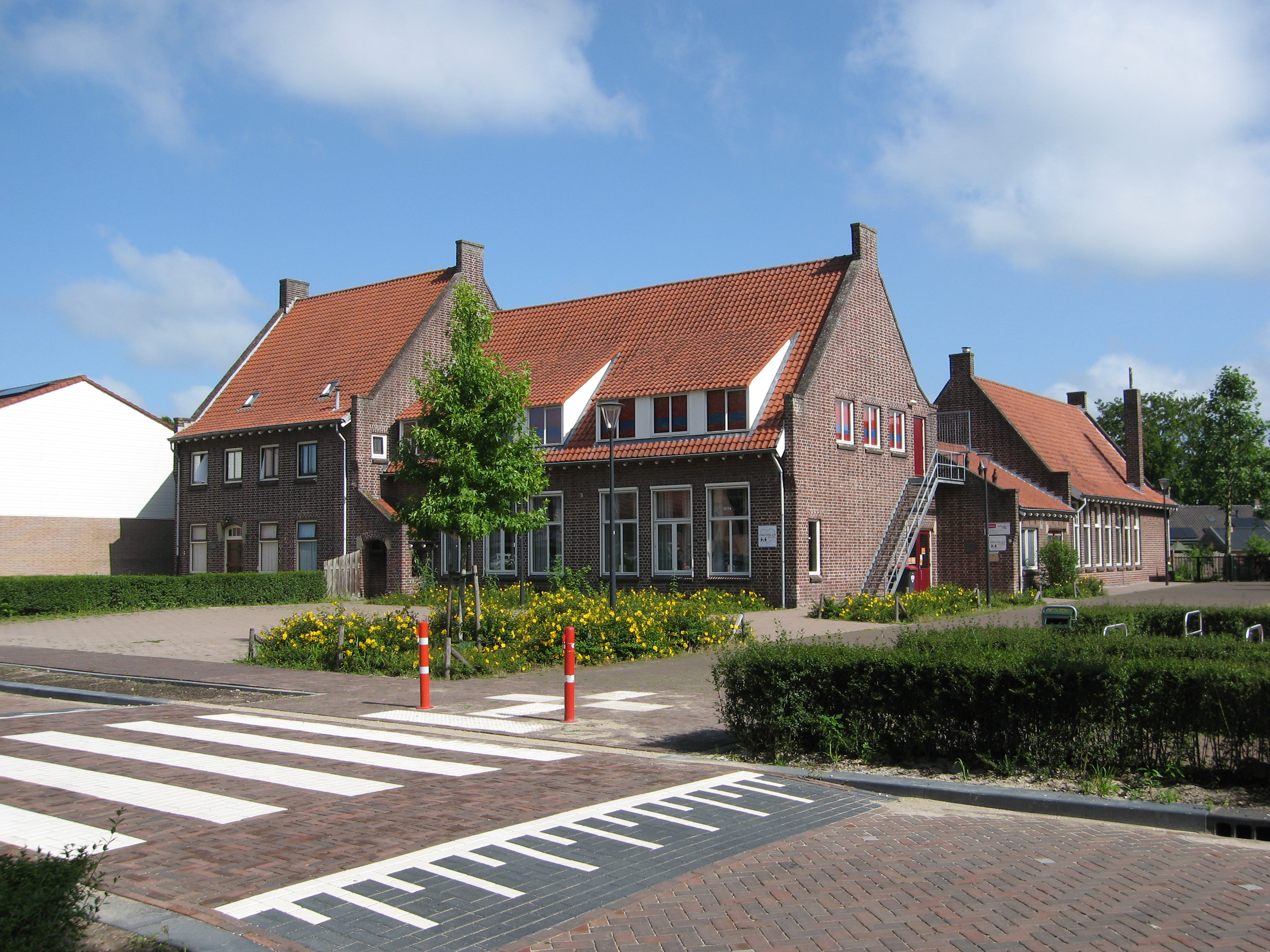
Community house

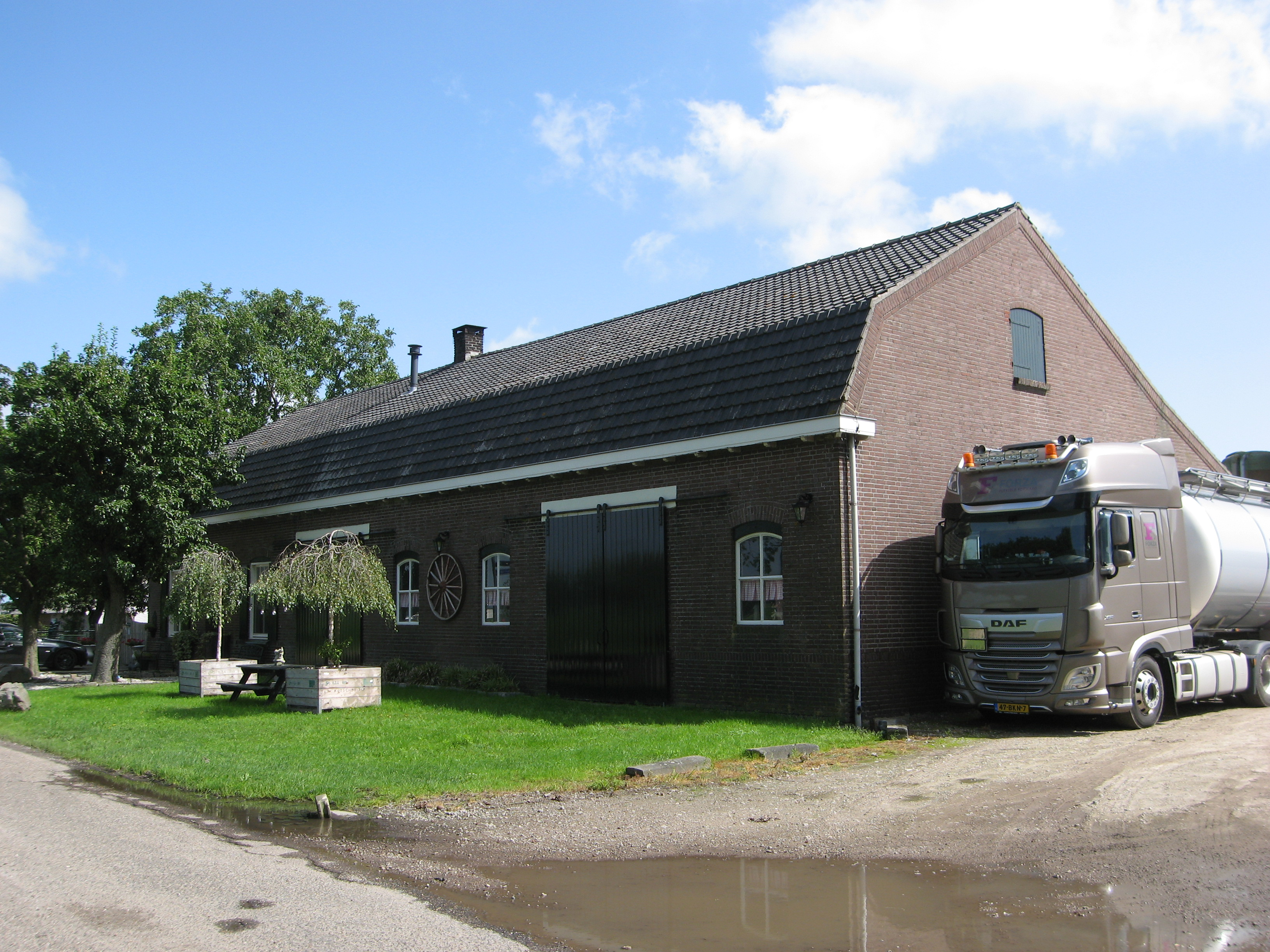
Farm in Odiliapeel
