= St. Willibrord's Abbey =

Dutch Monastery

Coordinates: 51.9514°N 6.3675°E

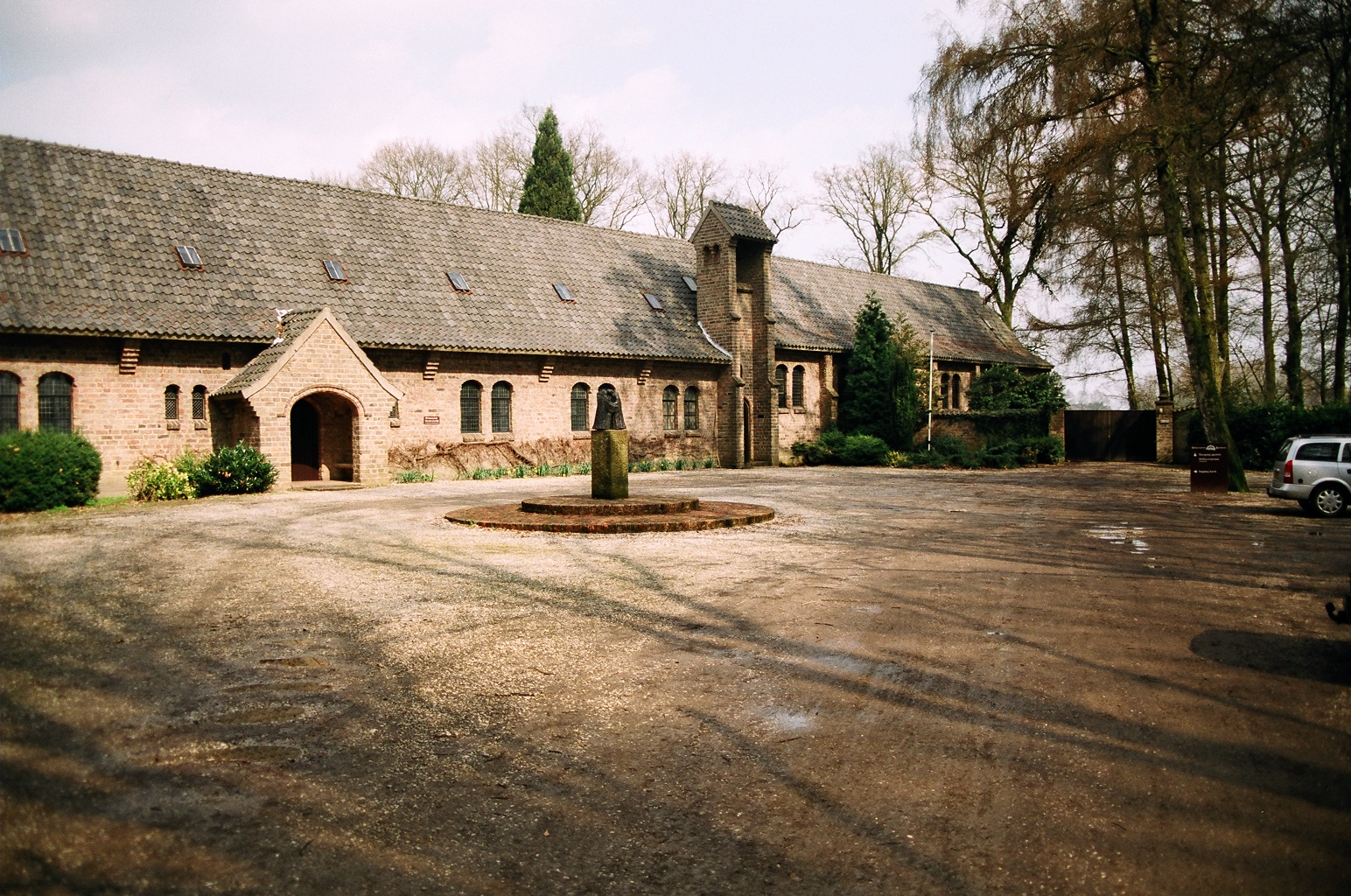
St. Willibrord's Abbey

St. Willibrord's Abbey (Dutch: Sint-Willibrordsabdij) at Doetinchem in Gelderland is the most recently established Benedictine monastery in the Netherlands.

== History ==
The monastery, dedicated to Saint Willibrord, was founded immediately after World War II by the over-populated Oosterhout Abbey. Initially the monks lived in Slangenburg Castle, which they partially restored. In the 1950s they succeeded in building a new monastery on part of the castle estate. As building materials were scarce immediately after the war, the monastery was largely built out of old paving stones, and the roofs were constructed without wood: the tiles sit directly on concrete beams.

A large new abbey church was planned, but never materialised: the present church building was originally intended as the monastery library.

The community has a long history of commitment to interreligious dialogue. The retreat house includes a zendo with a rock garden, patterned on the famous Zen gardens of Kyoto. Fr. Cornelius Tholens, abbot from 1954 to 1972, was a founder of the Dialogue Interreligieux Monastique, the European arm of the DIMMID which held its annual meeting here in 2019.
