= St. Benedictusberg Abbey =

St. Benedictusberg Abbey (The Abbey of Mt. St. Benedict)
- Mamelisabdij / Abdij va Mameles (Dutch: Abdij Sint-Benedictusberg) (Limburgish: Abdij St. Benedictusberg)
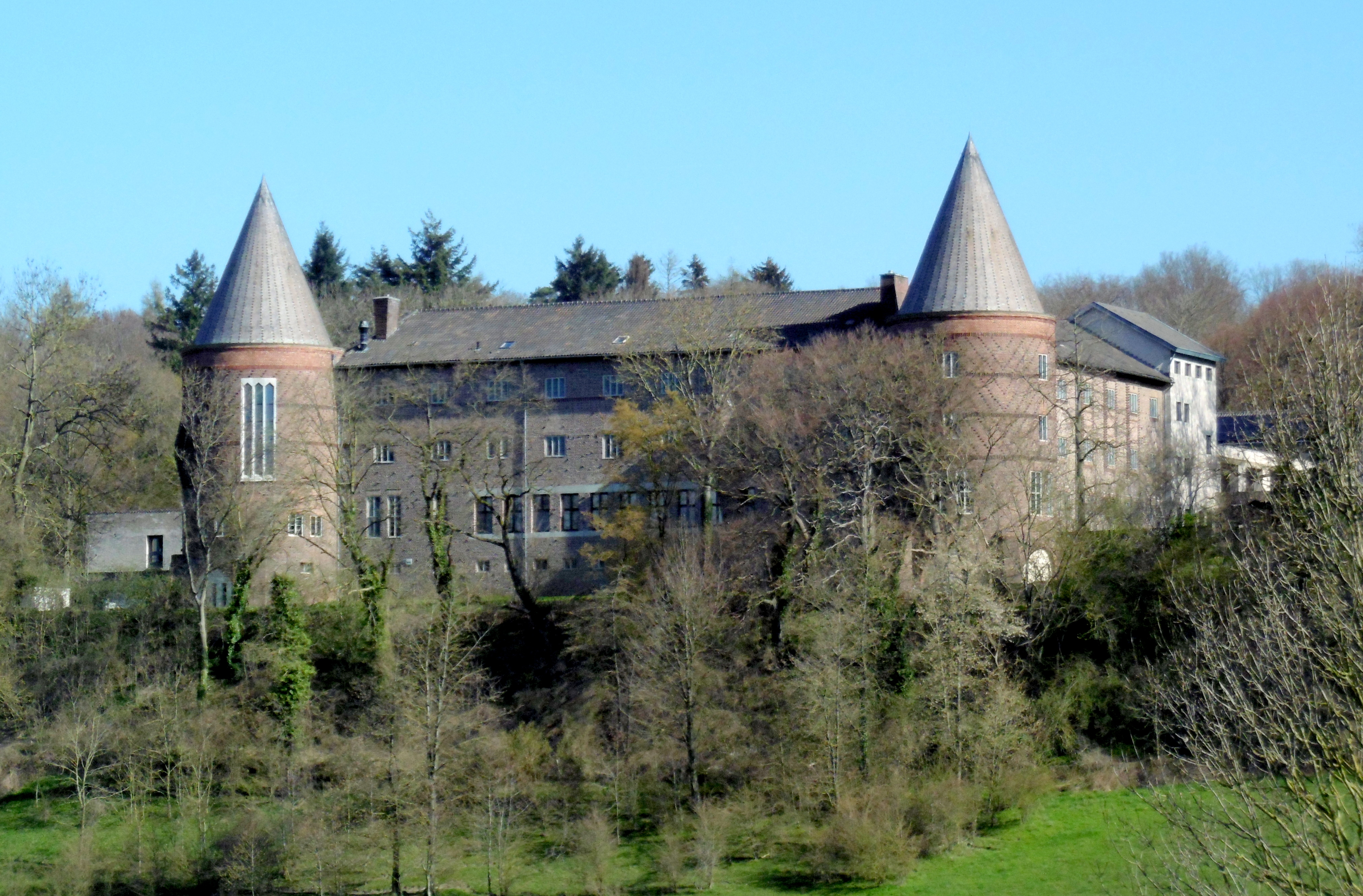
- St. Benedictusberg Abbey, Mamelis

- Location within Netherlands

General information
- Location: Mamelis, Vaals, Limburg, Netherlands
- Coordinates: 50°48′5″N 5°58′21″E

St. Benedictusberg Abbey, also Mamelis Abbey, is a Benedictine monastery established in 1922 in Mamelis, a hamlet which administratively falls within Vaals, Netherlands. It is a rijksmonument.

Since 1951 St. Benedictusberg has belonged to the Solesmes Congregation, which is part of the Benedictine monastic confederation.

== History ==
As part of Bismarck's power struggle (Kulturkampf) with the Roman Catholic Church in Germany, monastic orders had been forbidden to accept novices. The 1872 Jesuits Law had banned the more assertively independent Catholic orders, and the Benedictines had in effect found themselves exiled. A change of pope in 1878 toned down Rome's confrontational approach, but the restrictions in Germany were relaxed only slowly, and during the 1870s large numbers of religious Catholic refugees from Germany had settled in the Netherlands and in Belgium.

A number of originally German monks remained at Affligem Abbey in central Belgium, as part of this German monastic diaspora, and in 1893 a group of them set off to found a monastery of their own, the Abbey of St. Clement in Merkelbeek, Dutch Limburg, close to the frontier with Germany. St. Clement's was the first Benedictine foundation to be authorised in the Netherlands following the Protestant Reformation, three centuries earlier. Subsequently these German monks founded (or re-founded) Kornelimünster Abbey (near Aachen) in 1906 and an abbey at Siegburg in 1914. These monasteries, like Merkelbeek itself, were at this time part of the German "pro-province" of the Subiaco Cassinese Congregation.

The outbreak of war in 1914 created difficulties for Merkelbeek, with many of the monks forced to leave: not all would return. When the war ended, in late 1918, the monks decided to relocate to a site closer to the frontier with Germany, choosing to build on farmland half a kilometer outside the hamlet of Mamelis, in the southern part of Limburg. Work on construction of St. Benedictusberg Abbey began in 1922, with the first side of an imposing four sided edifice surrounding a central precinct, designed by the distinguished church architect Dominikus Böhm, working with a young Martin Weber. Construction was interrupted almost before it had started, in 1923, by the backwash from the economic crisis.

In 1927 Dom Romuald Walters affiliated the new Abbey to the Beuronese Congregation, which was then in a particularly dynamic phase, notable both for theological research and in respect of involvement with the modernisation of Gregorian liturgy. The Beuronese were also a relatively prosperous fulcrum of monastic revival.

The return of war in 1939 and the German invasion in 1940 brought massive new challenges, because the German monks were called up for military service. Those who refused were faced with sustaining their neutrality in an occupied country. Liberation in September 1944 brought no respite for the German monks in Limburg who were initially interned and then expelled to what remained of Germany.

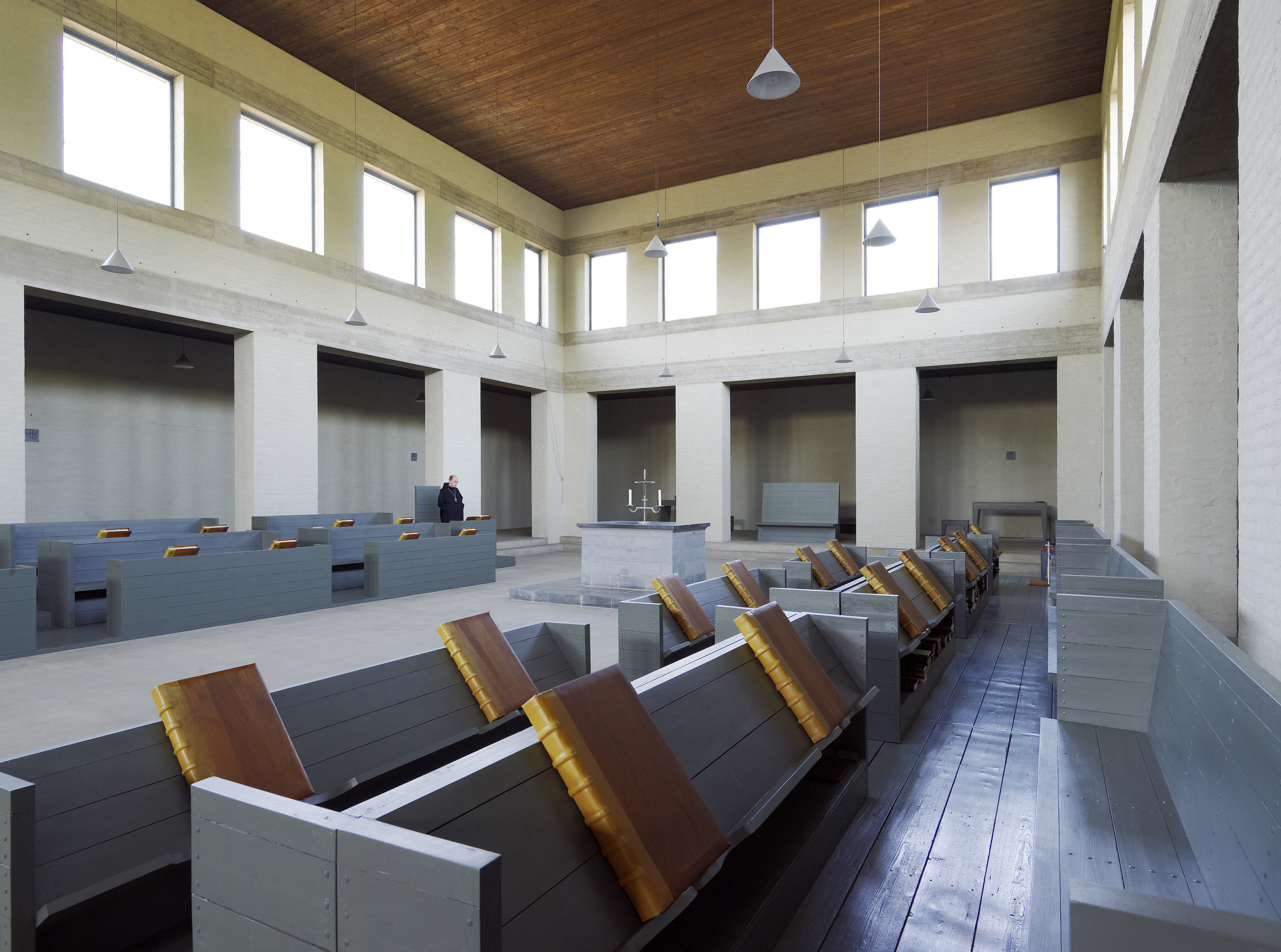
The 1967 St. Benedictusberg Abbey church by Hans van der Laan has plastic ratio proportions.

The monastery buildings were occupied by the American Army, later being used to house "political delinquents" and returning Dutch refugees from Indonesia. Just one monk, having Dutch citizenship, was permitted to remain within the walls of the monastery, and he prevented the total pillage and destruction of the monastic records, but most of these nevertheless disappeared.

In 1947 the diocese began negotiations with the Benedictine congregation over revival of monasticism at Mamelis, and it was agreed that the foundation should be placed within the Benedictine Solesmes Congregation. That happened in 1951, with the arrival in November of thirteen monks from Oosterhout.

Finally a monastery church was built, and consecrated in 1962. It received abbey status in 1964.

== Today ==
Offices are sung in Latin, with prominence given to Gregorian chant.

From 1964 tot 1996, Dom Nicolaas de Wolf (1931-2015) was abbot. He was succeeded by Dom Adrianus (Ad) Lenglet. At the moment (April 2026) about 11 monks are living in the abbey. In addition, the abbey has about 60 oblates.
