= St. Paul's Abbey, Oosterhout =

Former Benedictine abbey in the Netherlands

Coordinates: 51°38′17.45″N 4°52′31.66″E

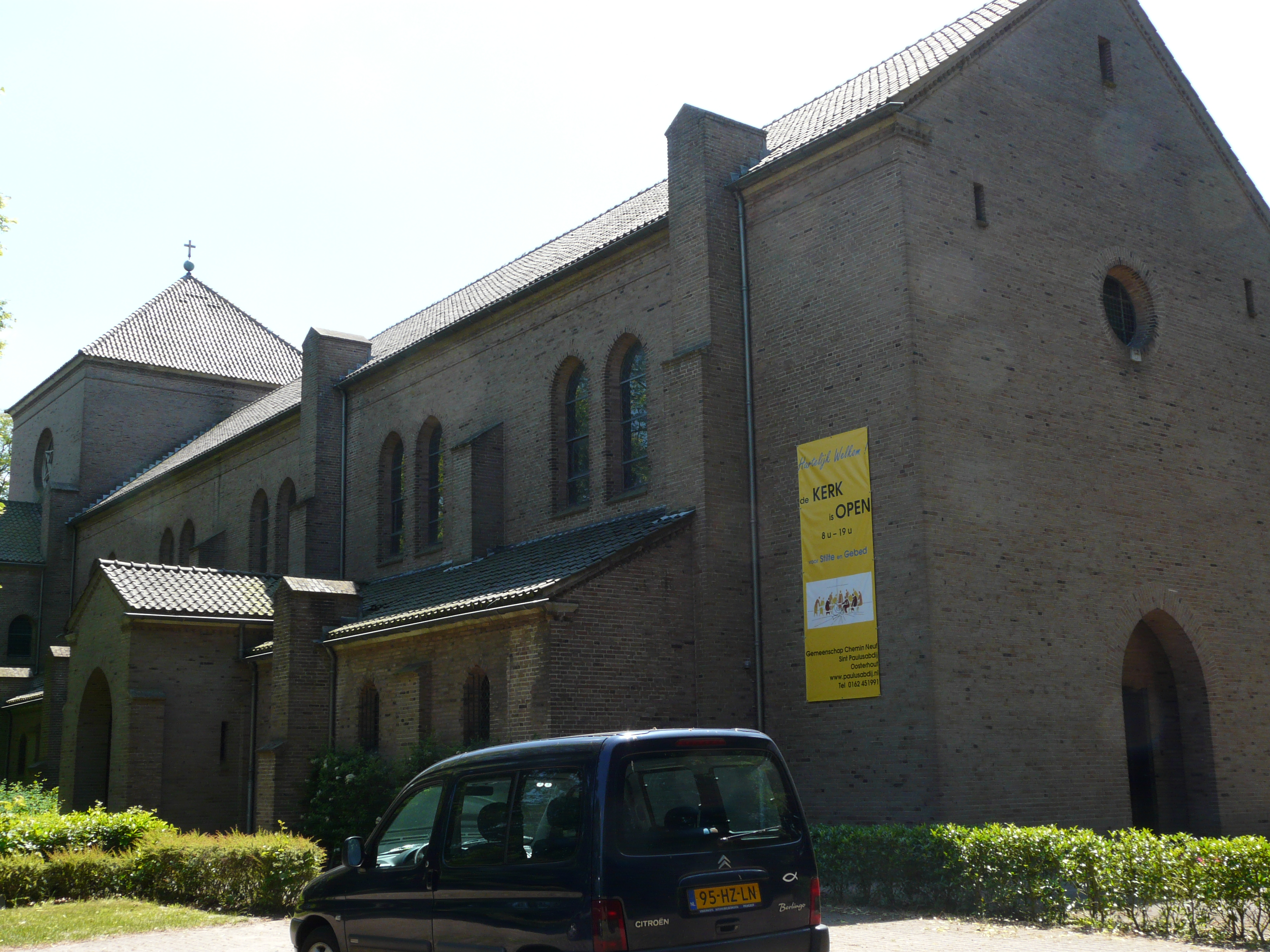
Abbey church

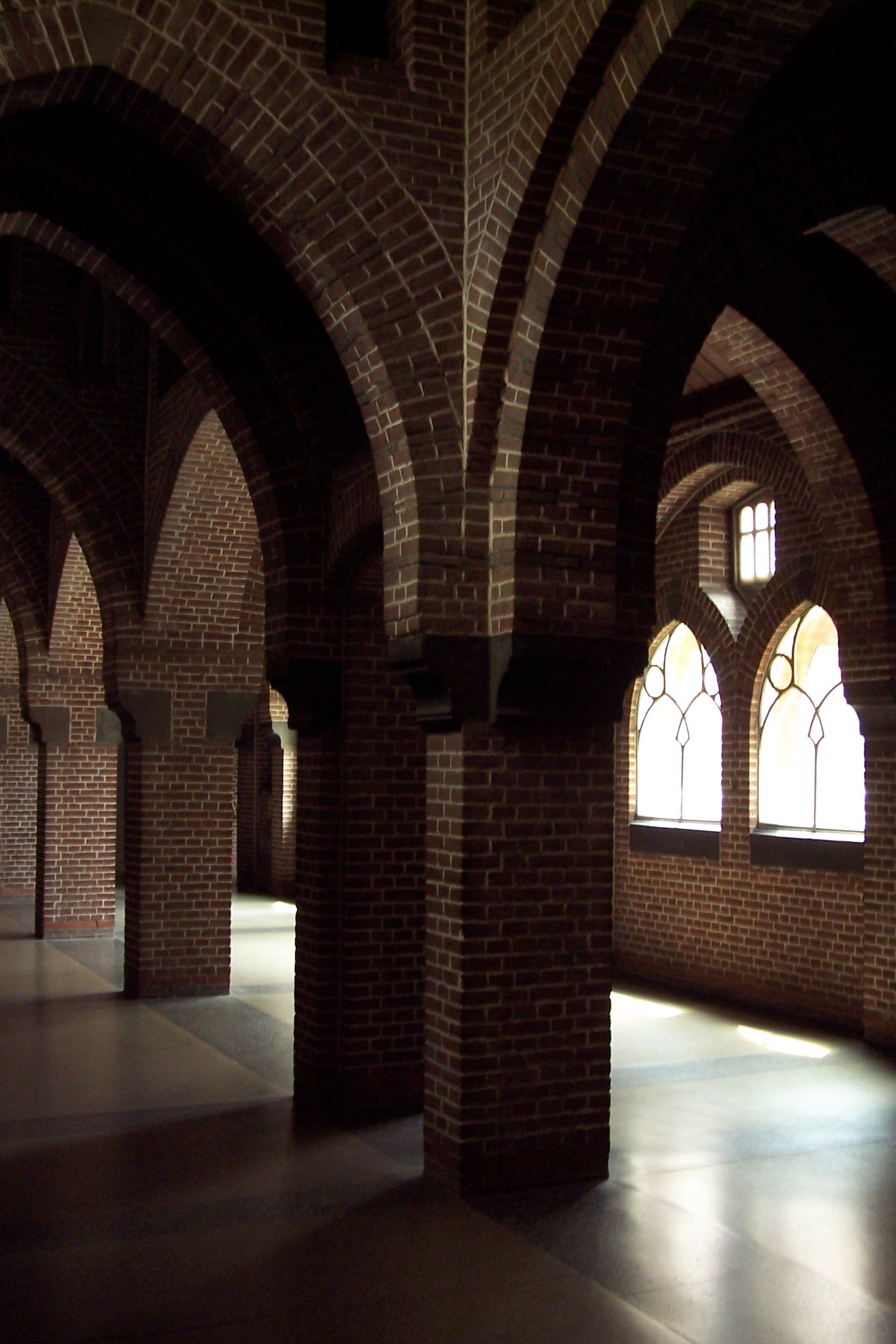
Brick architecture by Dom Bellot

St. Paul's Abbey, Oosterhout, also Oosterhout Abbey (Dutch: Sint-Paulusabdij) is a former Benedictine abbey in Oosterhout, North Brabant, the Netherlands.

== History ==
St. Paul's Abbey was founded by monks from Wisques Abbey in Wisques in the Pas-de-Calais who were forced to leave France by the anticlerical policies and popular feeling of the period. The community settled initially in Belgium, at first in Honnay and later in Montignies-Saint-Christophe. The Benedictine nuns of Wisques had already settled in Oosterhout in the Onze-Lieve-Vrouweabdij (Abbey of Our Lady, Oosterhout) and the abbot of Solesmes wanted both communities close to each other in the same town. The monks therefore bought 2 hectares of land nearby but had difficulties with the Dutch architect who was working for the nuns. Eventually the new priory was built under the supervision of the architect Dom Bellot, and proved to be a masterpiece of brick architecture, as well as the architect's first great work. The building was finished in 1907 and the community was raised to the status of an abbey in 1910. Dom Jean de Puniet was the first abbot.

After 1918 the monks were able to return to France if they wished but not all did so, and a number of Dutch monks by that time had joined the community. In the end the restored community at Wisques from 1920 numbered about 30 monks and became a priory under the supervision of Oosterhout. In 1928 Oosterhout and Wisques became independent abbeys belonging to the Benedictine Solesmes Congregation. In 1922 the writer Frederik van Eeden was baptised in this abbey after his conversion.

The monks of Oosterhout remained largely French, including the abbot, but Dutch monks entered in increasing numbers and by 1941 the community consisted of about 100. The abbey businesses also flourished: a farm, poultry-raising, an orchid nursery, a pottery, icon painting and the restoration of artworks. They also specialised in historical and liturgical research.

On land which the abbey had bought in 1908 in Egmond-Binnen, the architect Alexander Kropholler was commissioned in 1929 to build a monastery, St. Adelbert's Abbey, declared a priory in 1936.

After the death of Dom de Puniet in 1941 a Dutch abbot was elected, Dom Mähler.

In 1930 the chapter room was built, with Hans van der Laan as architect. Together with Nico van der Laan he also designed the guest house. This was the first work on the basis of the architectural numerical ratios that culminated in the Bossche School. In 1956 a new church was also built, designed by J.H. Sluijmer, as the old one had become too small.

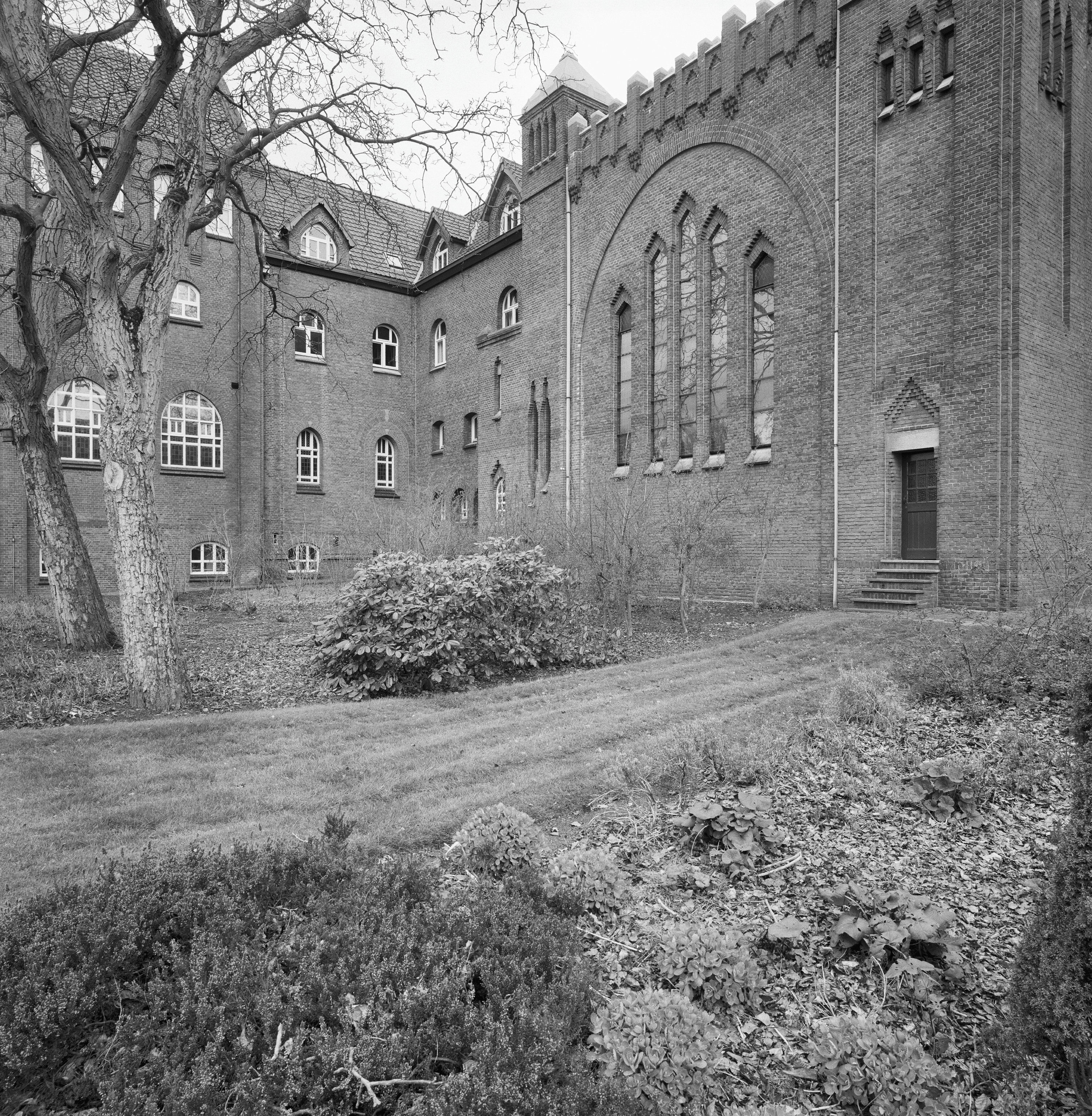
View of the abbey 2001

After World War II there were many new entrants and this made possible the foundations of St. Willibrord's Abbey at Slangenburg and of St. Benedictusberg Abbey at Mamelis in Vaals.

In 1969 a Dutch Congregation within the Benedictine Confederation was formed, which the two abbeys in Oosterhout joined, as did those in Egmond and Slangenburg. The abbey in Vaals remained part of the Solesmes Congregation. St Paul's Abbey was the archabbey of the new Congregation.

== Decline ==
Shortly afterwards however the post-war movement away from the Church, particularly marked in the Netherlands, began to make itself felt in the significant reduction in the number of novices, which had the effect of making the community a smaller and rapidly aging one. More and more activities and the farming had to be passed into private hands. The abbey had eventually to be given up in 2006 and the 15 remaining monks, whose average age was 78, went to the monastic care home Zuiderhout in Teteringen, although the survivors attend an annual service in the former abbey church at Oosterhout. The Chemin Neuf Community took over the buildings. The abbey's many works of art were given in 2007 to the Museum Catharijneconvent in Utrecht.

The abbey was registered as a Rijksmonument in 2001.

== Notable monks of Oosterhout ==
- Paul Bellot, architect
- Pieter van der Meer de Walcheren, writer
- Father Frans Huiting, prior
- Michel van Winkel, PPR politician
- Jacques van der Meij, artist
- Mattheus Notenboom, ceramicist
- In 1974 a 45-year-old monk of Oosterhout, Brother Mattheus, was arrested after confessing to having provided weapons to the imprisoned criminals Jan Brouwers and Daan Denie, who were thus enabled to escape from prison.
