= Heilig Geist, Frankfurt =

Heilig Geist
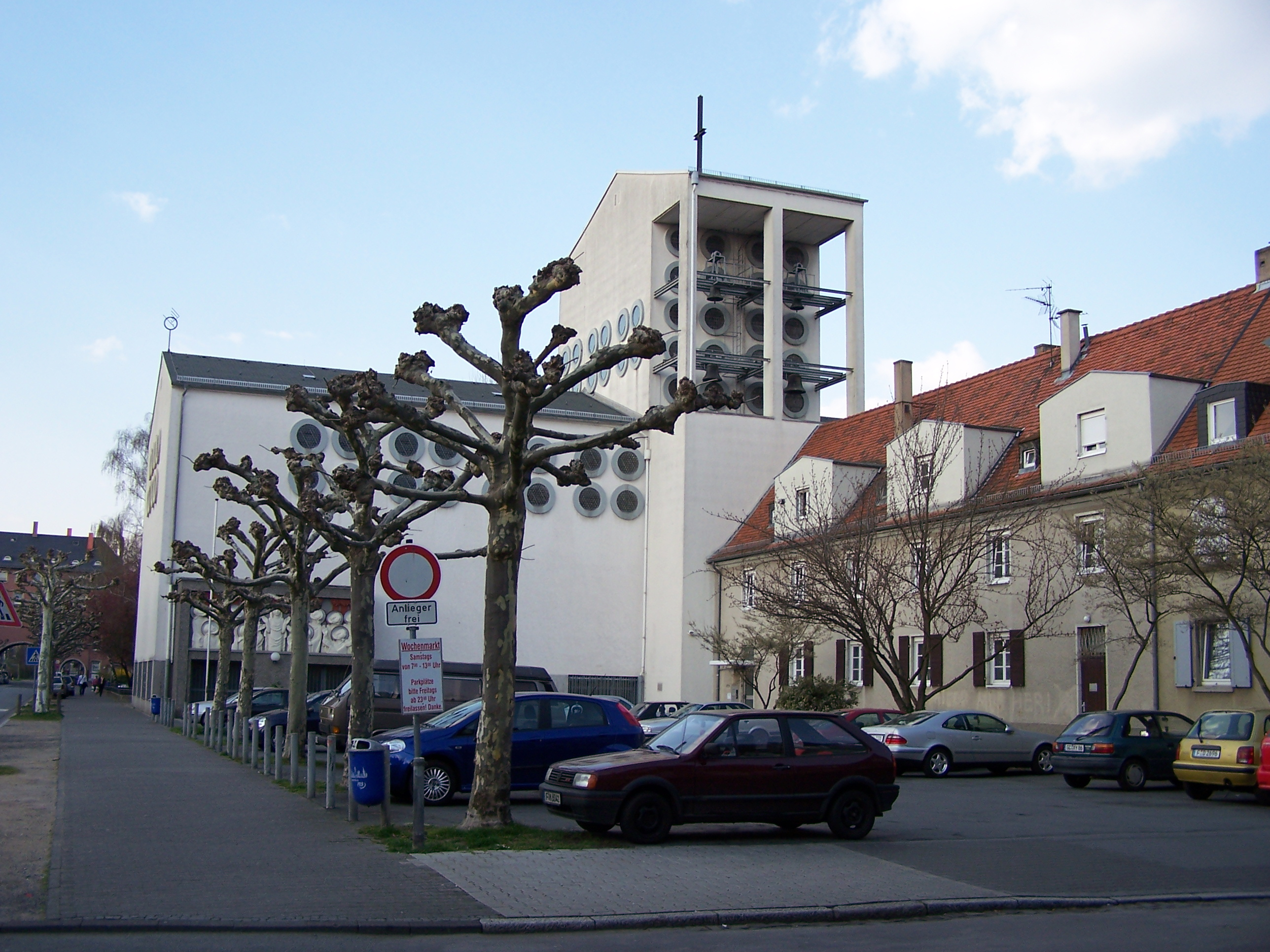
- View from Schäfflestraße
- Heilig Geist
- 50°07′45″N 8°44′03″E
- Location: Frankfurt am Main, Germany
- Denomination: Catholic

Administration
- Diocese: Limburg

Heilig Geist (Holy Spirit) is the name of a Catholic church in the suburb Riederwald of Frankfurt am Main, Hesse, Germany. The parish church of the Riederwald congregation is part of the Roman Catholic Diocese of Limburg. On 1 January 2015 the parish became a Kirchort (church location), part of the parish St. Josef, Frankfurt.

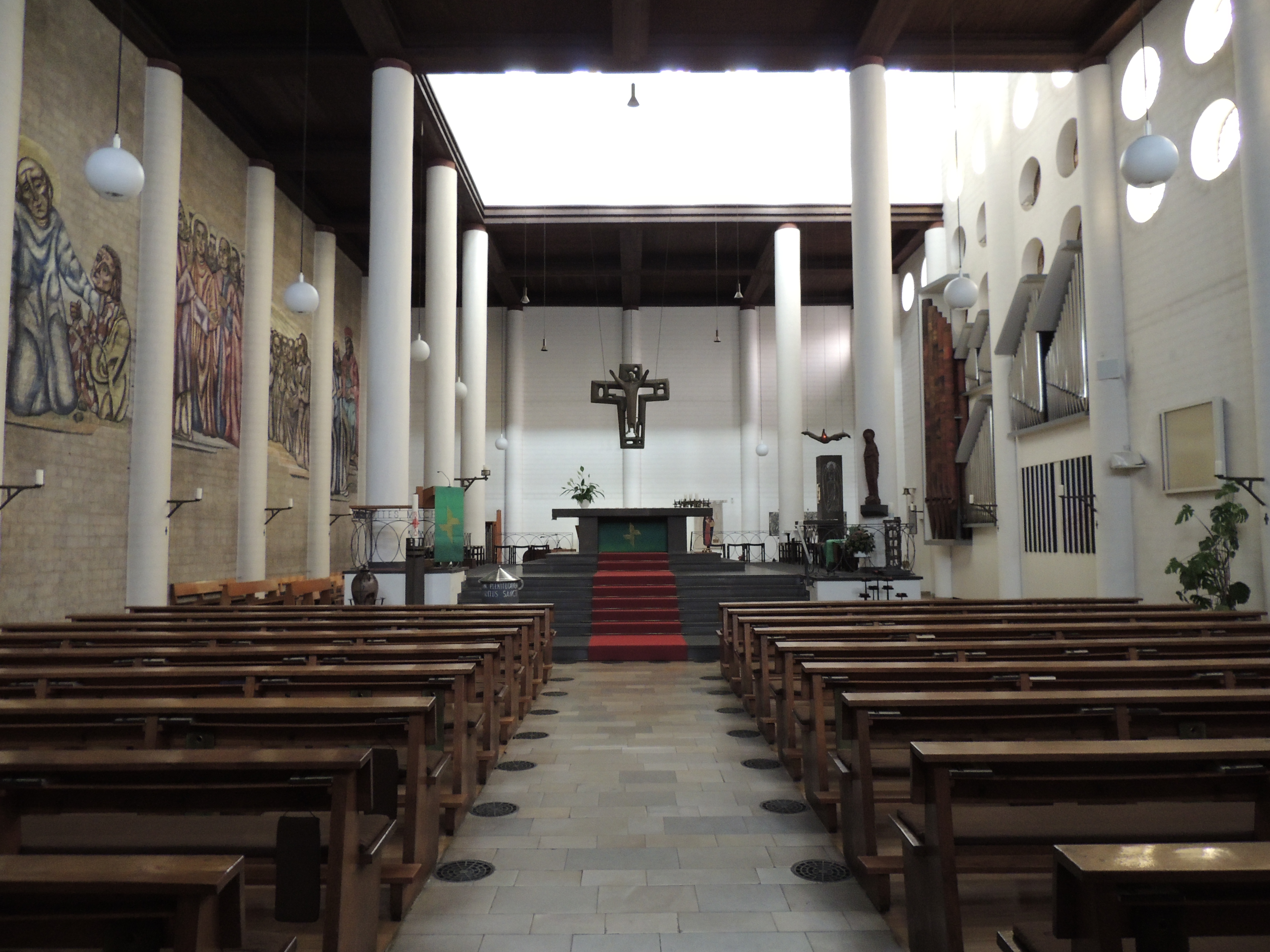
Interior

== Logos ==
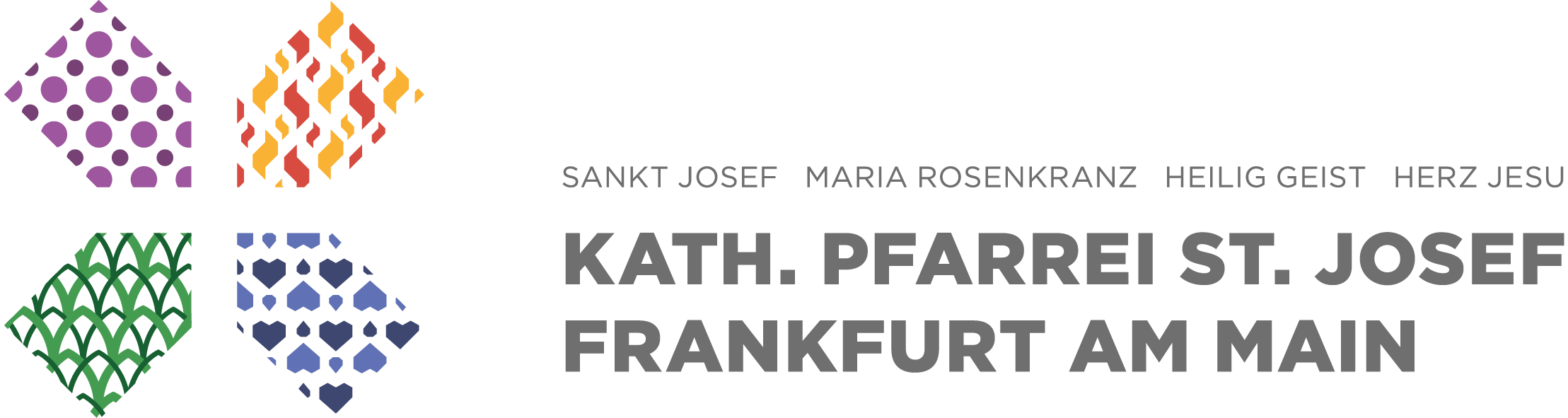
Logo of the Parish of St. Josef Frankfurt am Main

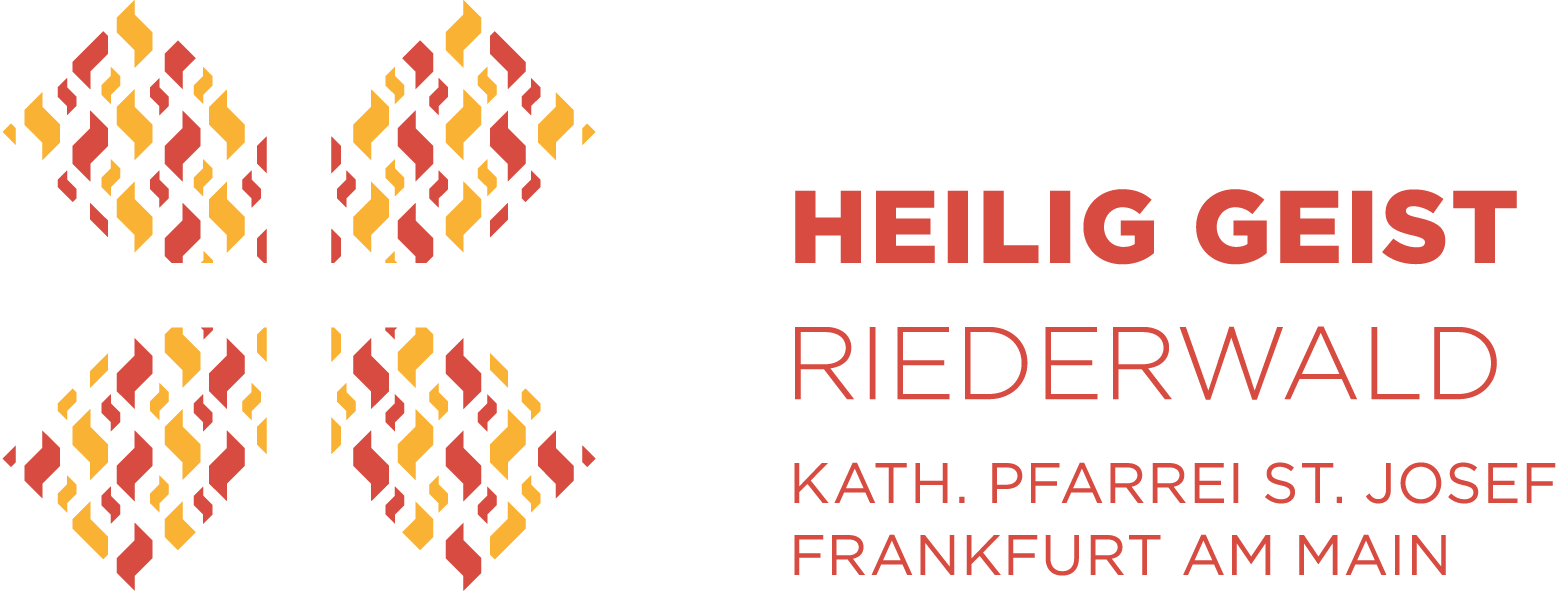
Logo of the church location

Logo of the Roman Catholic Diocese of Limburg

== History ==
In 1923, the parish bought a property to build a church, designed by Martin Weber on a commissioned by minister Georg Heinrich Hörle. Groundbraking was on 13 July 1930. It was dedicated by Bishop Antonius Hilfrich on 20 September 1931.

The church was severely damaged during World War II. It was restored after the war. Wilhelm Kempf, later Bishop of Limburg, was parish priest of the congregation from 1942 to 1949. From 1991, Peter Reulein was the church musician, who moved then to the Liebfrauen in the centre of Frankfurt.

On 1 January 2015, four parishes were combined to St. Josef, with locations (Kirchort) St. Josef, Maria Rosenkranz, Heilig Geist and Herz Jesu.

== Building ==
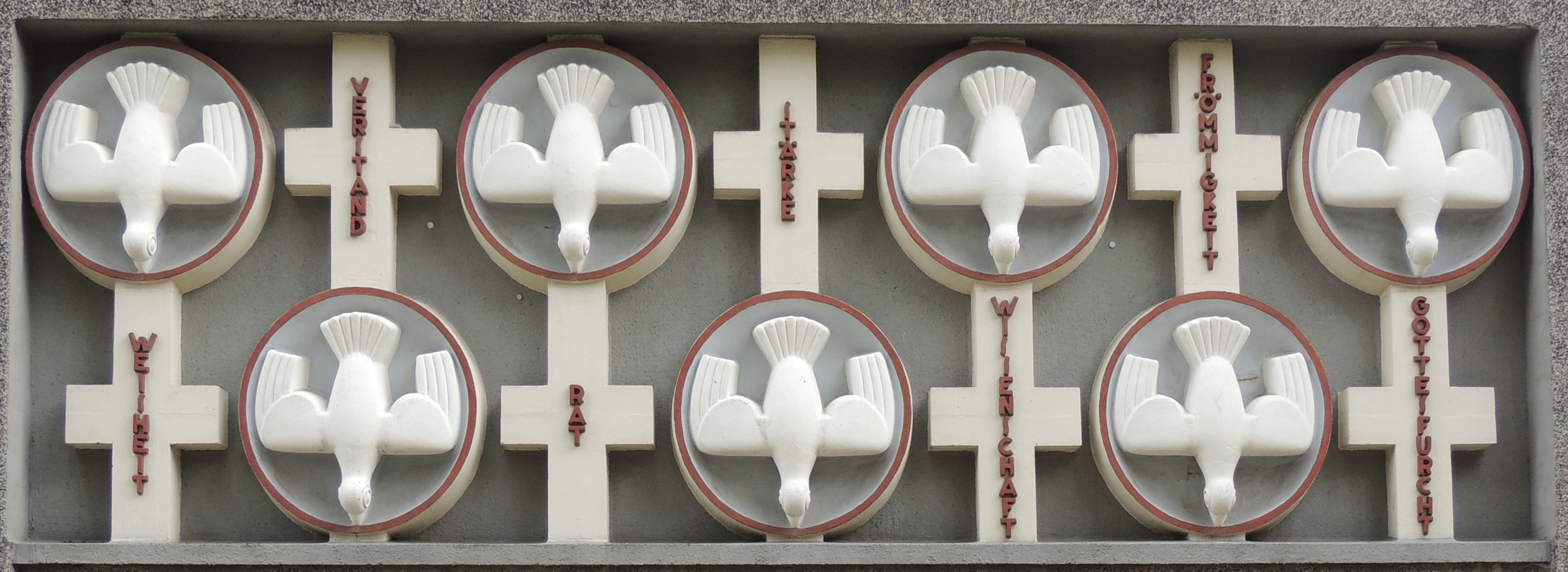
Relief Seven gifts of the Holy Spirit (North portal) by Arnold Hensler

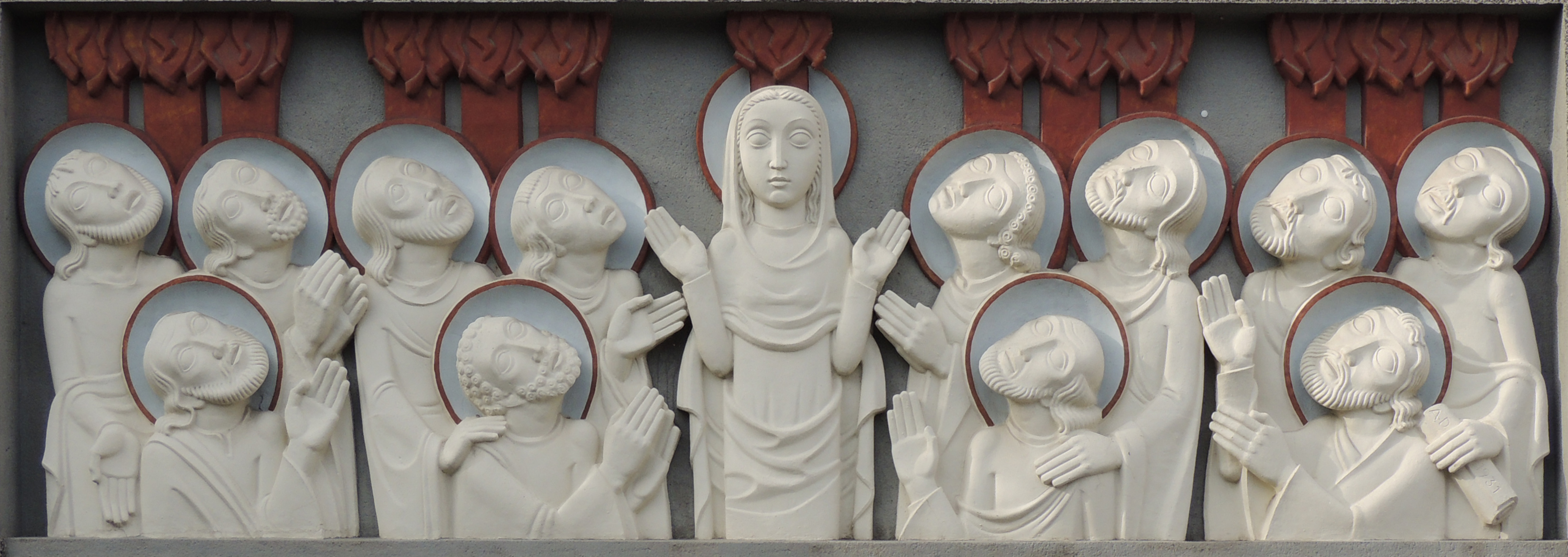
Relief Pentecost (South portal) by Hensler

The church was designed intentionally modest, different from more monumental works by Weber such as Heilig Kreuz in Bornheim. The church is connected to the minister's house.

== Literature ==
- Lothar Altmann (1977), Hl.-Geist-Kirche Frankfurt am Main (in German), München + Zürich: Schnell & Steiner
- Georg Heinrich Hörle (1931), Die Heilig-Geist-Pfarrei und ihre neue Kirche in Frankfurt am Main-Riederwald (in German), Frankfurt am Main
- Gudrun Berger, Harald Berger, Gaby Gann, Ludwig Janzen, Heinrich Kress, Walter Kropp, Dieter Muthig, Willi Thiele, Martin Weber (2006), Katholische Kirchengemeinde Zum Heiligen Geist Frankfurt-Riederwald (ed.), 75 Jahre Heilig-Geist-Kirche Frankfurt Riederwald 1931–2006 – Festschrift zum 75. Kirchweihfest der Heilig-Geist-Kirche Frankfurt am Main-Riederwald (in German), Frankfurt am Main: Katholische Kirchengemeinde Zum Heiligen Geist Frankfurt-Riederwald
- Adrian Seib (2011), "Martin Weber – Die Kirchen Heilig-Kreuz und Heilig-Geist in Frankfurt am Main als bahnbrechende Sakralbauten im Werk des Architekten", Das münster – Zeitschrift für christliche Kunst und Kulturwissenschaft (in German), vol. 64, no. 1, Regensburg: Schnell & Steiner, pp. 3–9, ISSN 0027-299X
- Franz Josef Hamm (2011), "Martin Weber und Arnold Hensler – Eine Künstlerpartnerschaft", Das münster – Zeitschrift für christliche Kunst und Kulturwissenschaft (in German), vol. 64, no. 1, Regensburg: Schnell & Steiner, pp. 10–19, ISSN 0027-299X
