= Holy Cross Church, Frankfurt-Bornheim =

Roman Catholic Church in Frankfurt am Main-Bornheim, Germany (built 1929)

Coordinates: 50°07′37″N 08°43′06″E

Heilig-Kreuz-Kirche Holy Cross Church
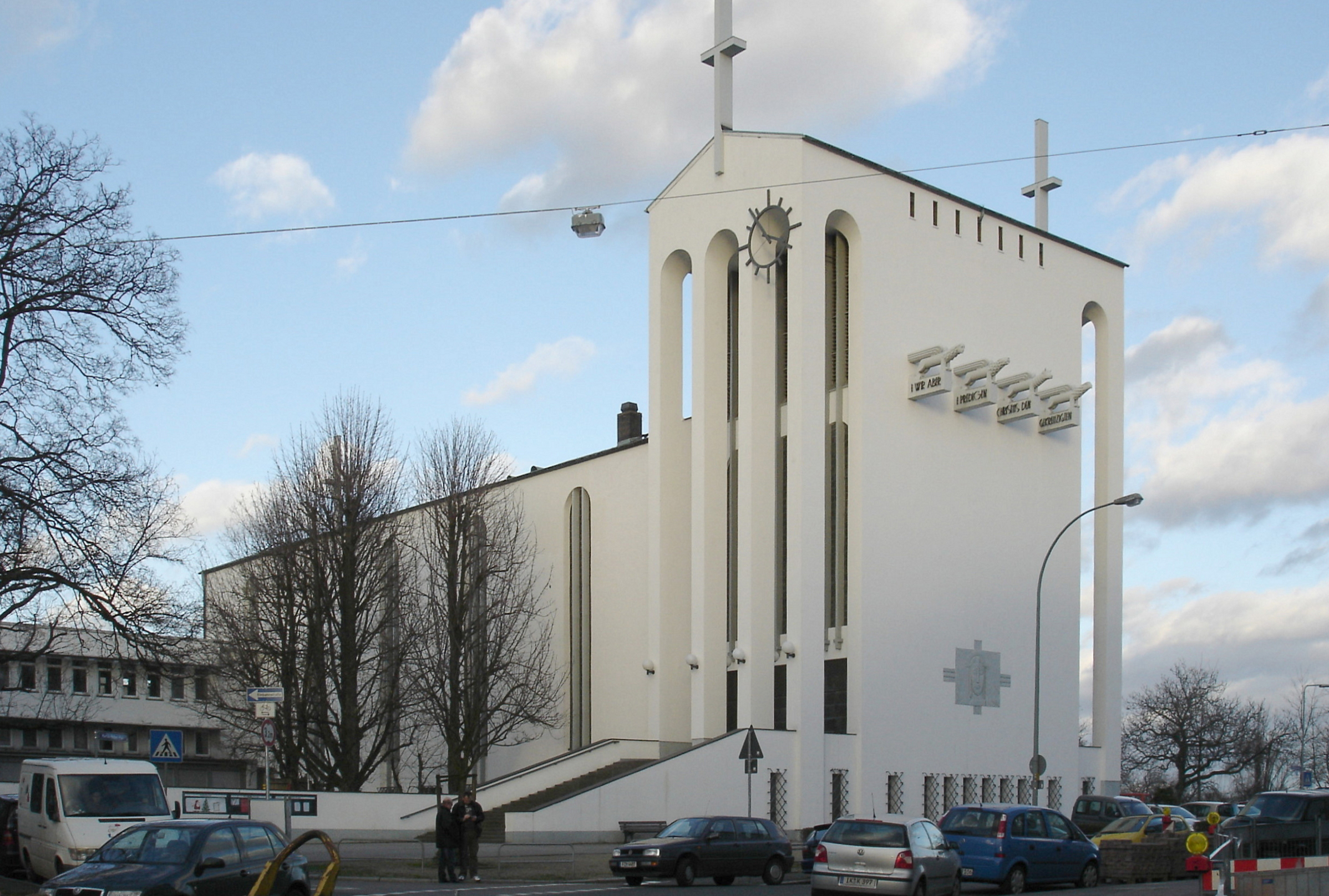
- Holy Cross Church from south west

- Location within Hesse
- Location: Frankfurt-Bornheim, Hesse
- Country: Germany
- Language(s): German (until 2025); English (until 2026)
- Denomination: Catholic
- Website: none

History
- Status: future unclear
- Founder: Joseph Höhler
- Dedication: Holy Cross
- Dedicated: 25 August 1929
- Consecrated: 25 August 1929

Architecture
- Functional status: Active
- Heritage designation: Kulturdenkmäler in Hessen; Cultural monuments in Hesse
- Architect: Martin Weber
- Architectural type: Church
- Style: New Objectivity; Modern architecture
- Years built: 1928–1929
- Groundbreaking: 19 February 1928
- Completed: 25 August 1929

Specifications
- Capacity: between 850 and 950 visitors
- Length: 53.20 metres (174.5 ft)
- Width: 18.52 metres (60.8 ft)
- Height: 25.00 metres (82.02 ft)
- Materials: Steel frame, Concrete

Administration
- Diocese: Diocese of Limburg

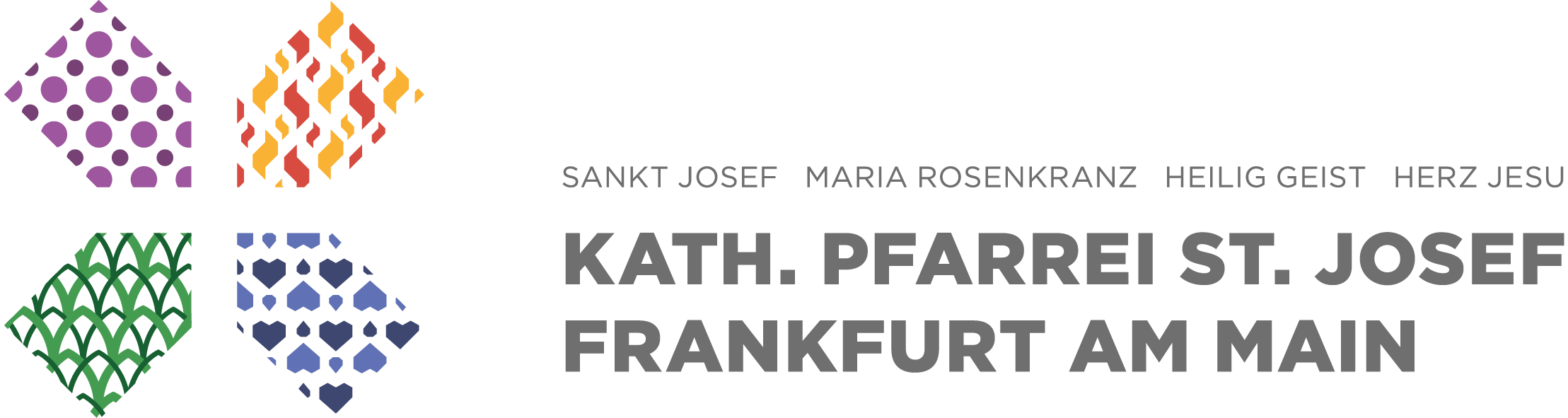
- Parish: St. Josef Frankfurt am Main

Clergy
- Priest: none

The Holy Cross Church (German: Heilig-Kreuz-Kirche) is a Catholic church in the Bornheim district of Frankfurt am Main (Germany) in the Bornheimer Hang settlement. From 1929 to 1950 and again from 2007 to 2015, it was a branch church of the parish of St. Josef in Frankfurt am Main. In between, the church had its own parish from 1950 to 2007. From 2007 to 2025, it was the seat of the meditation centre of the Diocese of Limburg. From 2011 until mid of June 2026, it has been a church location of the International English-Speaking Catholic. The future of the church building after that was still uncertain in June 2026 but a sale was planned. The church is located in the Diocese of Limburg.

The church was built by Martin Weber from 1928 to 1929, on a rise then known as Bornheimer Hang. It was finally completed on 25 August 1929 and handed to the Catholic congregation of Bornheim. It was damaged during Second World War and subsequently rebuilt with the help of donations. The Holy Cross Church is considered an important example of modern Catholic sacred architecture from the late 1920s. Martin Weber's design is attributed to New Objectivity or avant-garde church architecture of the interwar period and is part of the urban planning program New Frankfurt (German: Neues Frankfurt), which is considered part of the New Building (German: Neues Bauen) movement in architecture. The church is in the context of modernist architecture, without belonging to the Bauhaus style in the narrower sense. Its design is similar to the Frauenfriedenskirche (Church of Our Lady of Peace) in Frankfurt-Bockenheim.

== Current or most recent use ==
With the reintegration of its own parish into the parish of St. Josef, the use of the church changed fundamentally. The diocese dedicated it from 1 August 2007 as the location of a Holy Cross – Centre for Christian Meditation and Spirituality. The centre was directed from August 2007 until July 2018 by the Franciscan Helmut Schlegel OFM, who worked there until June 2019 as a retreat and meditation leader and priestly co-worker. Since November 2018 until May 2024 the centre was directed by the theologian Samuel Stricker, who worked with a team of contributors, for example from the order of Medical Mission Sisters. In May 2024, Sr. Kristina Wolf MMS took over as acting director of the centre, as Samuel Stricker moved to another position within the Diocese of Limburg. At the end of August 2025, the closure of the meditation centre of the Diocese of Limburg founded in 2007 and its location was announced at the end of the year with a celebration on the Saturday before the fourth Sunday of Advent, 20 December 2025. The last event held at the meditation centre in Holy Cross Church after its official closure on 20 December 2025, was the Midnight Mass at Christmas Eve on 24 December 2025. As the future use of the church had not yet been decided at the end of December 2025, some events continued to be held in January 2026 in rooms such as the crypt.

Following the announcement that the meditation centre would close at the end of 2025, the future use of the church building was still undecided at April 2026. According to the Diocese of Limburg, various options were being considered. At the beginning of December, discussions took place between the parish of St. Josef Frankfurt and the Diocese of Limburg. One of the possibilities was the sale and conversion of the church and the former rectory on Kettelerallee. The kindergarten run by the parish and the rest of the building above it would not be affected. At that time, there were three options for the parking lot with access from Löwengasse. A final decision had not yet been made at the time of the last update of the article.

The uncertain situation facing the church in December 2025 caused sadness and despair among many participants at the meditation centre and members of the parish. This affected, among others, members of groups from the former Holy Cross parish, which existed until 2007 and still used church premises in 2025. A petition in a letter to the diocese called for prospects, participation in the process, and transparent information, especially for these groups. For older parishioners in particular, the journey to St. Josef's parish church was too far. No further German-language Catholic services had been scheduled at the Church of the Holy Cross since the end of December 2025.

Due to the restoration of the interior of St. Leonhard’s Church, services of the International English-Speaking Catholic Parish ave been held instead at Holy Cross Church since May 7, 2011. Even after the work at St. Leonhard’s was completed, this parish continued to hold its Sunday morning service at Holy Cross Church. In December 2025, it was announced that the International English-Speaking Catholic Parish could continue to use Holy Cross Church until the end of June 2026. A move to a different church location was planned for the period thereafter. At the end of March 2026, it was announced that from 21 June 2026, Liebfrauenkirche (=Church of Our Lady) in Oberursel (Taunus) would become the new church location for the English-speaking parish, replacing Holy Cross Church. The English-speaking congregation’s final service took place on 14 June 2026 at the Holy Cross Church, followed by the annual Parish Picnic.

The last time the public had the opportunity to enter the church was on 21 June 2026. As part of the World Design Capital programme organised by the World Design Organization (WDO), the final three of a total of eight ‘theatre strollings’ – held on three separate dates under the title ‘Built To Break – Architecture for All’ – took place in the Bornheimer Hang settlement, led by the performance group Boys* in Sync. with a tour of the space by the participants and a short choral concert by the vocal ensemble Vox Aevi. in the church.

== History ==
=== 20th century ===
==== Foundation ====
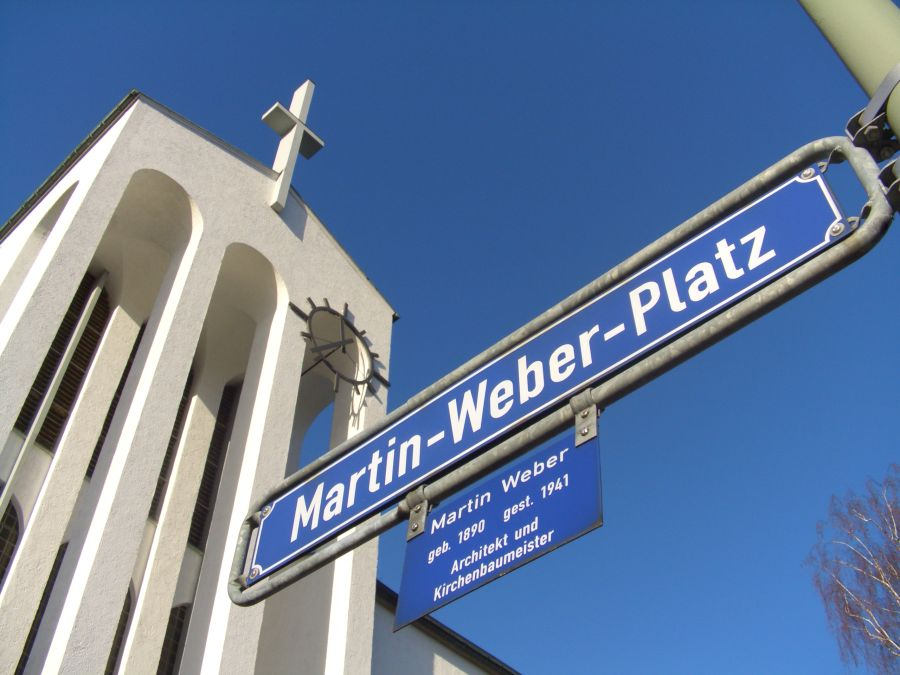
Steeple of the Holy Cross Church at the Martin-Weber-Platz

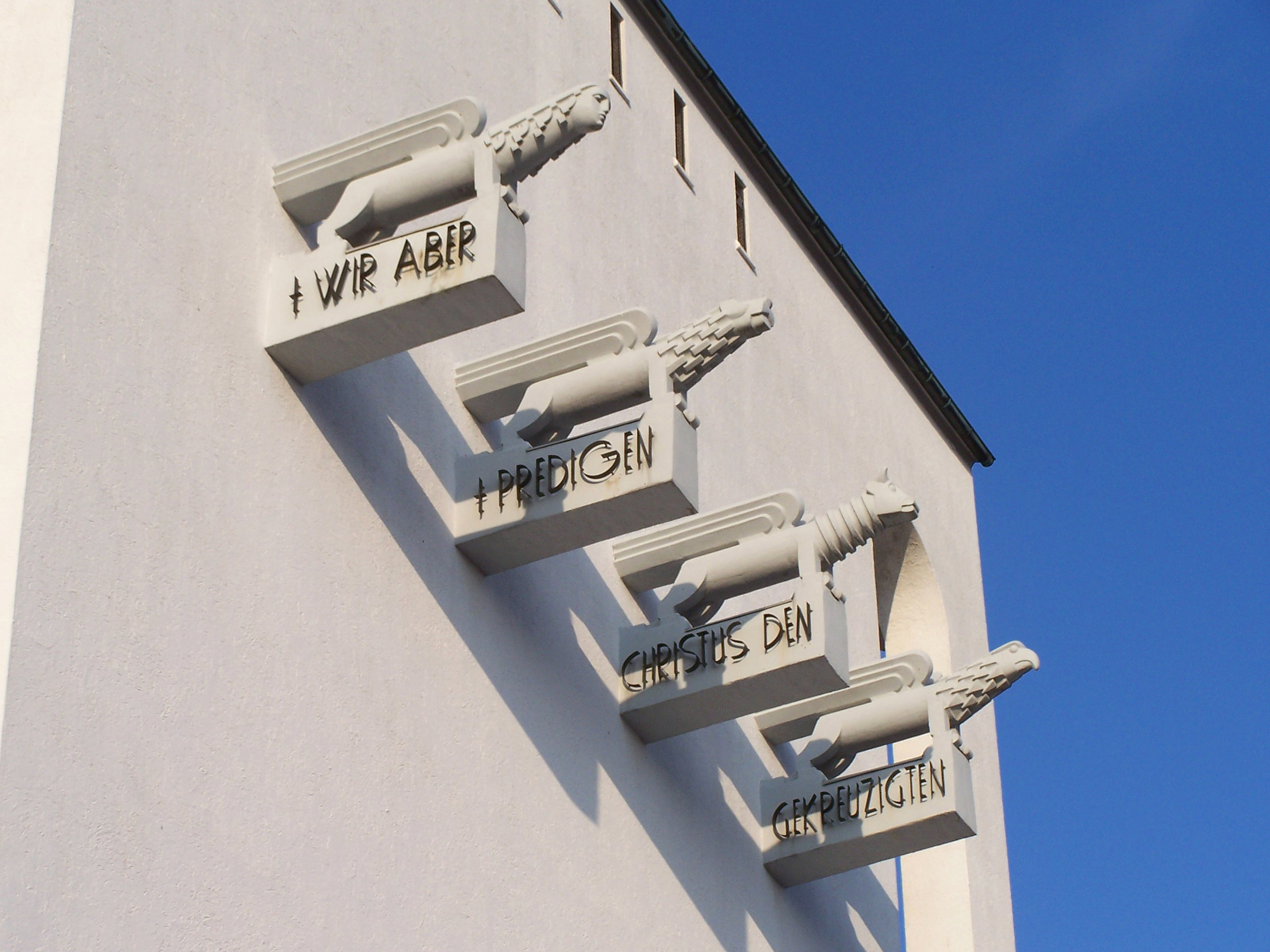
Four figures by Arnold Hensler at the south side of the steeple, symmbolizing the four Evangelists

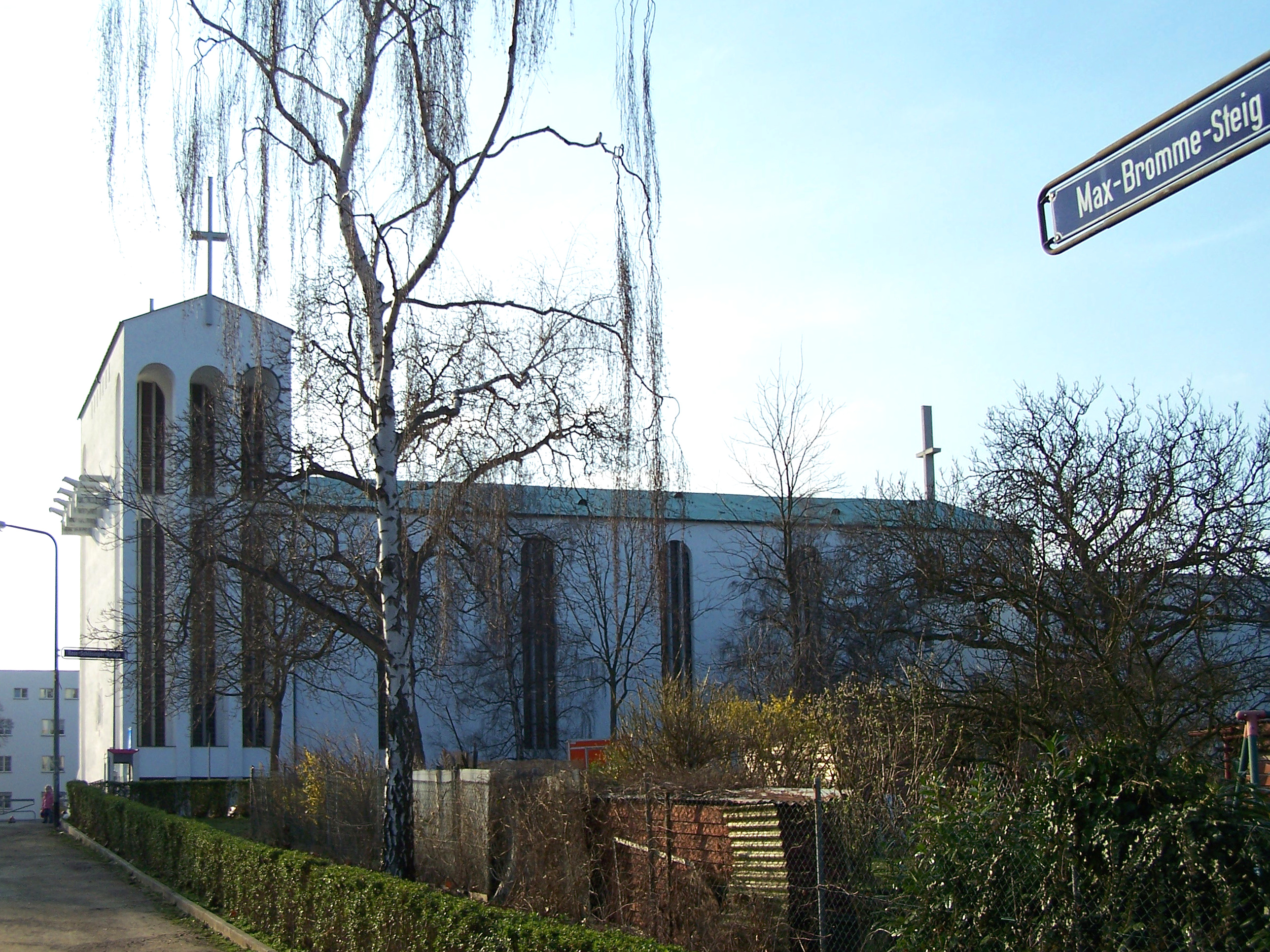
East side of Holy Cross Church, seen from the park on Bornheimer Hang

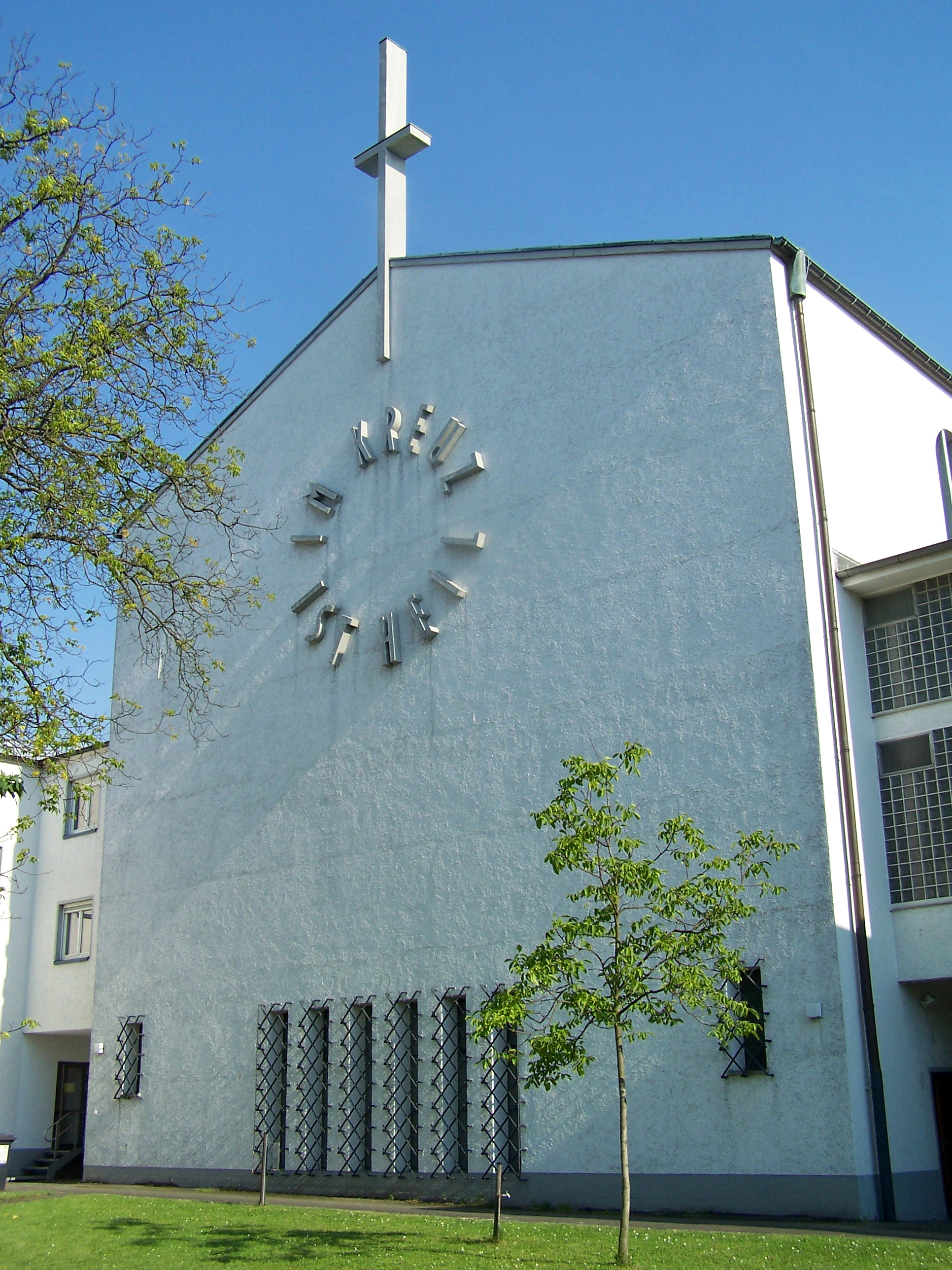
North side of the nave with circular inscription "Im Kreuz ist Heil" (Salvation is in the cross) by Arnold Hensler

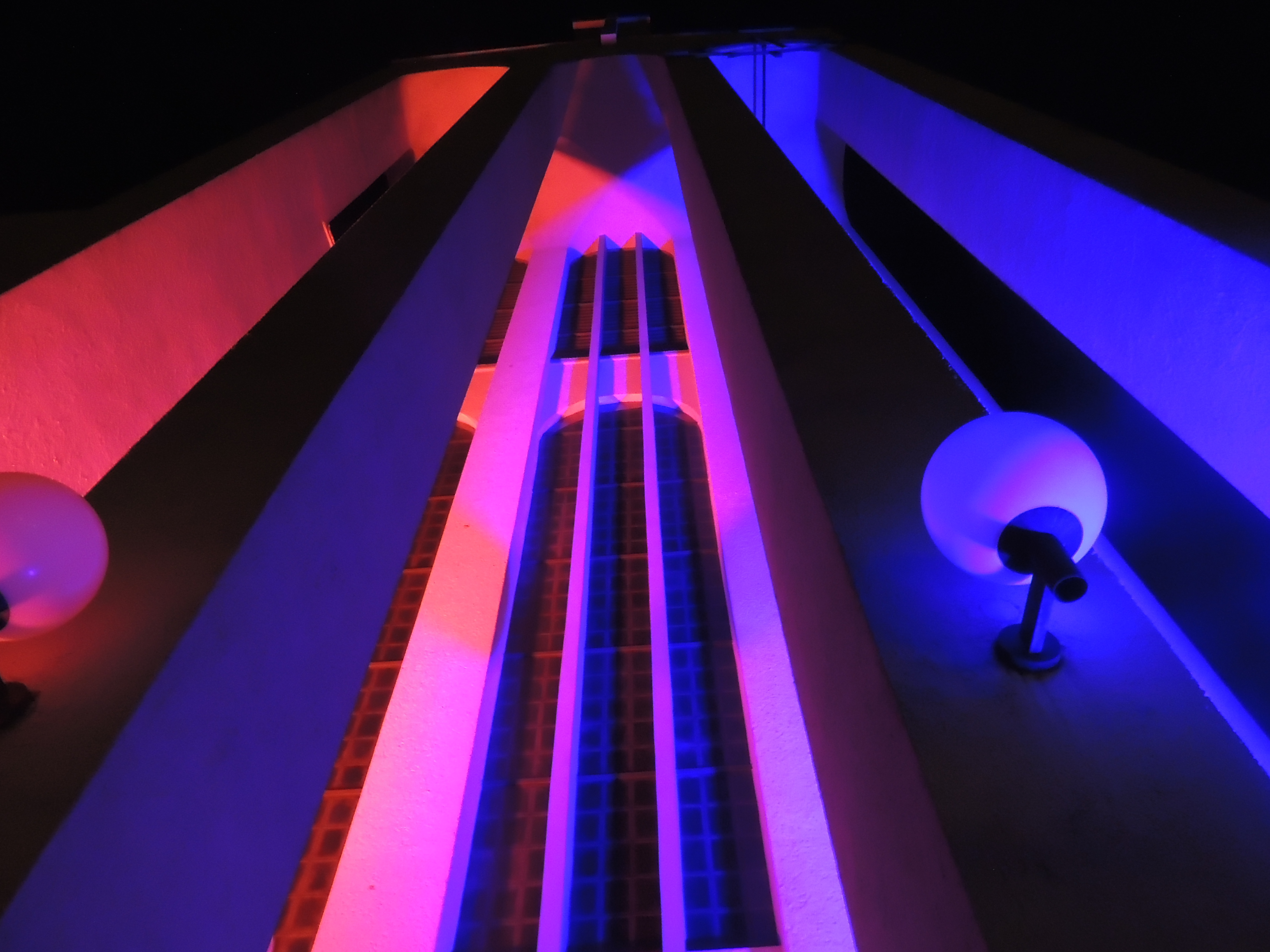
Exterior lighting at the tower on the first weekend of Advent 2020

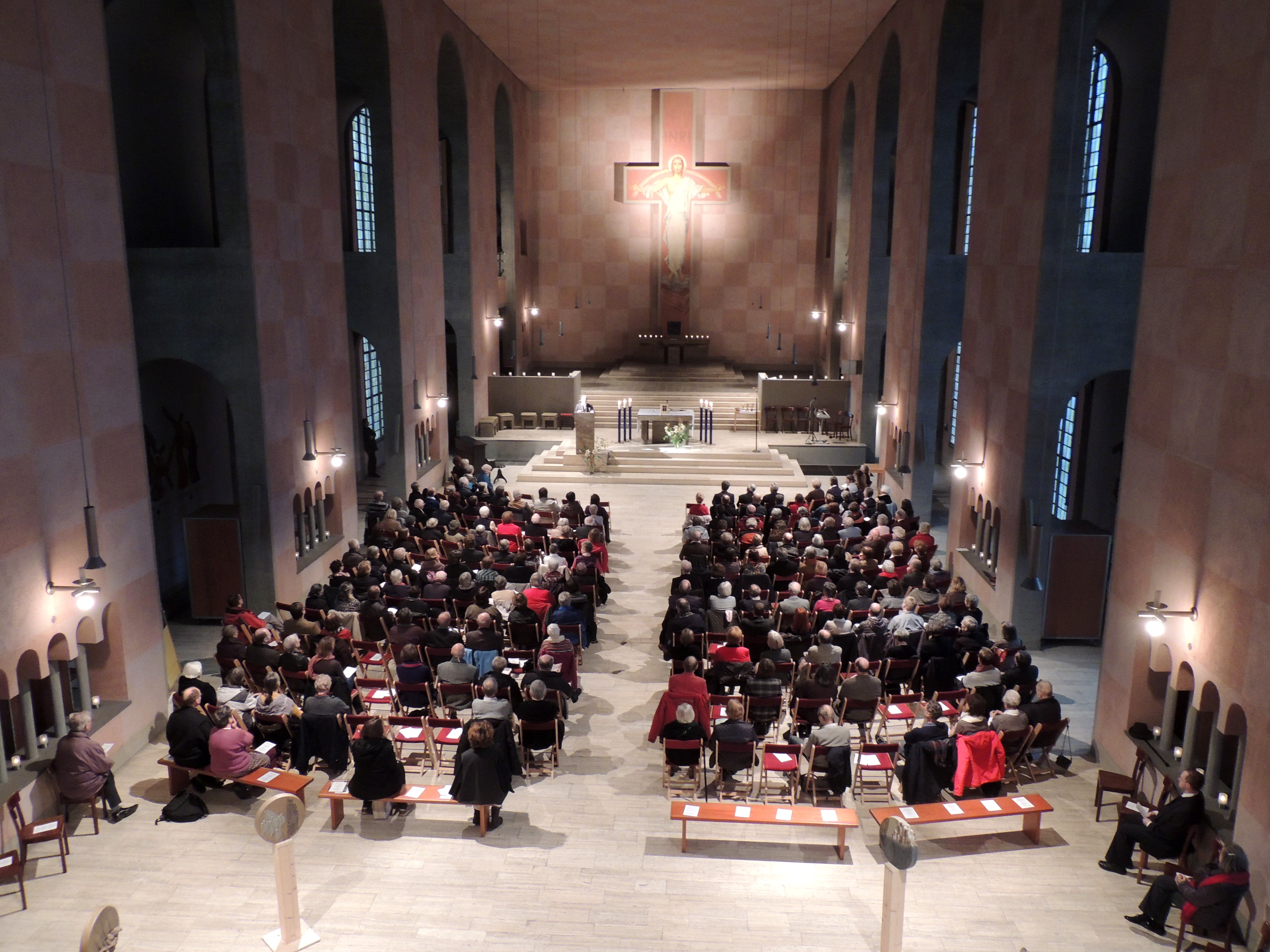
Interior, fifth anniversary of the centre on 11 November 2012

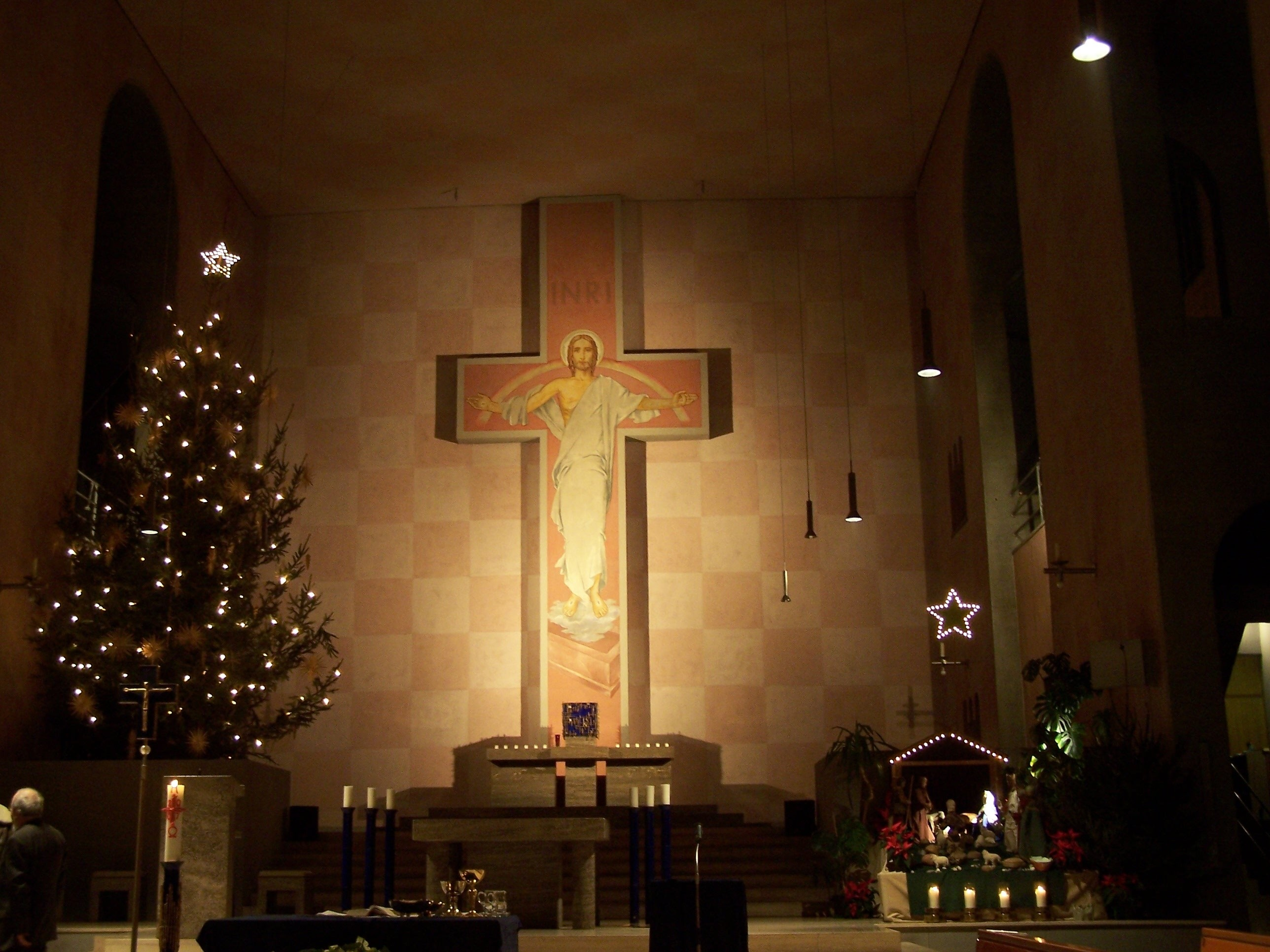
Chancel at Christmas 2007

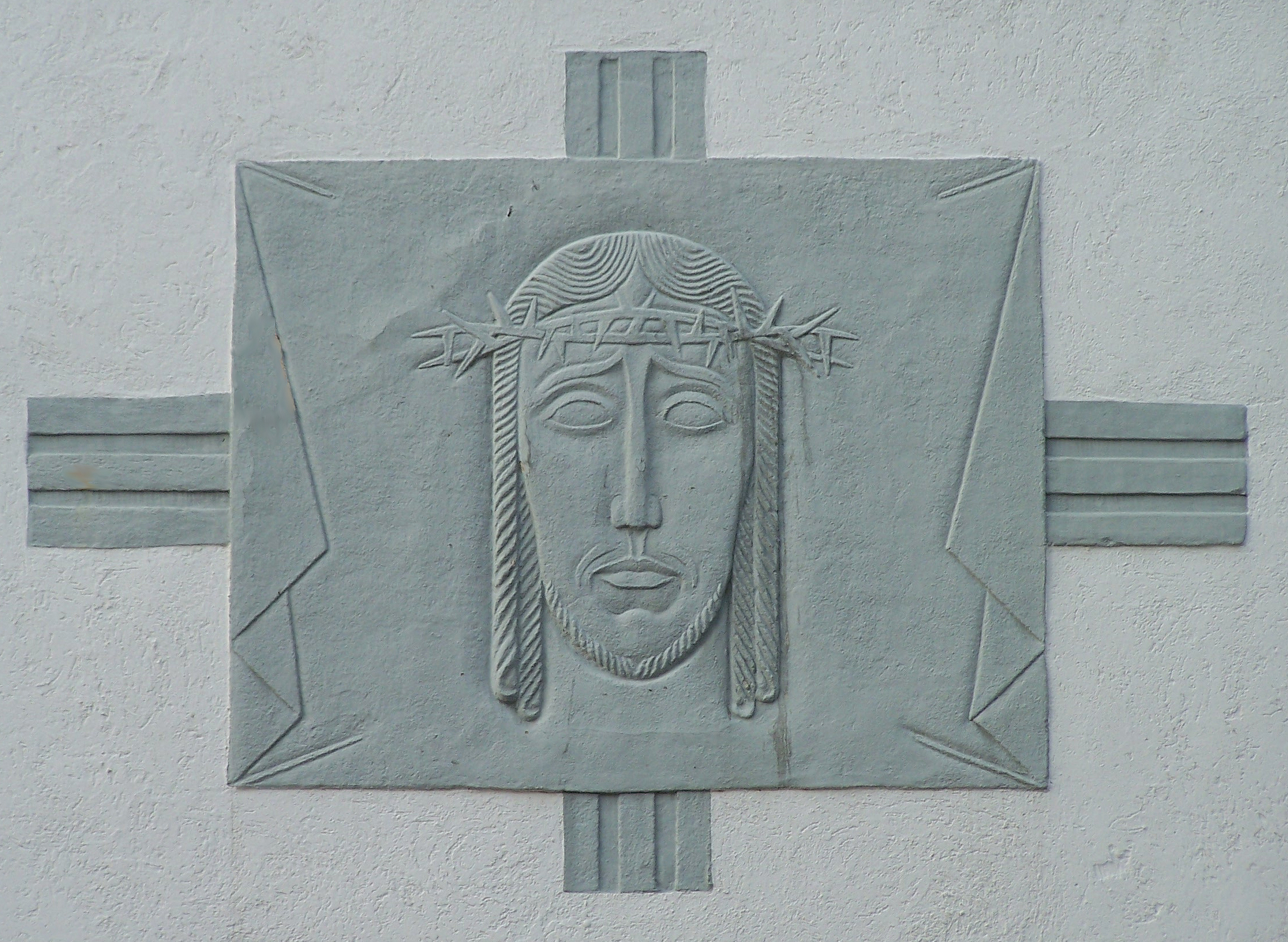
Veil of Veronica by Arnold Hensler at the southern wall of the steeple

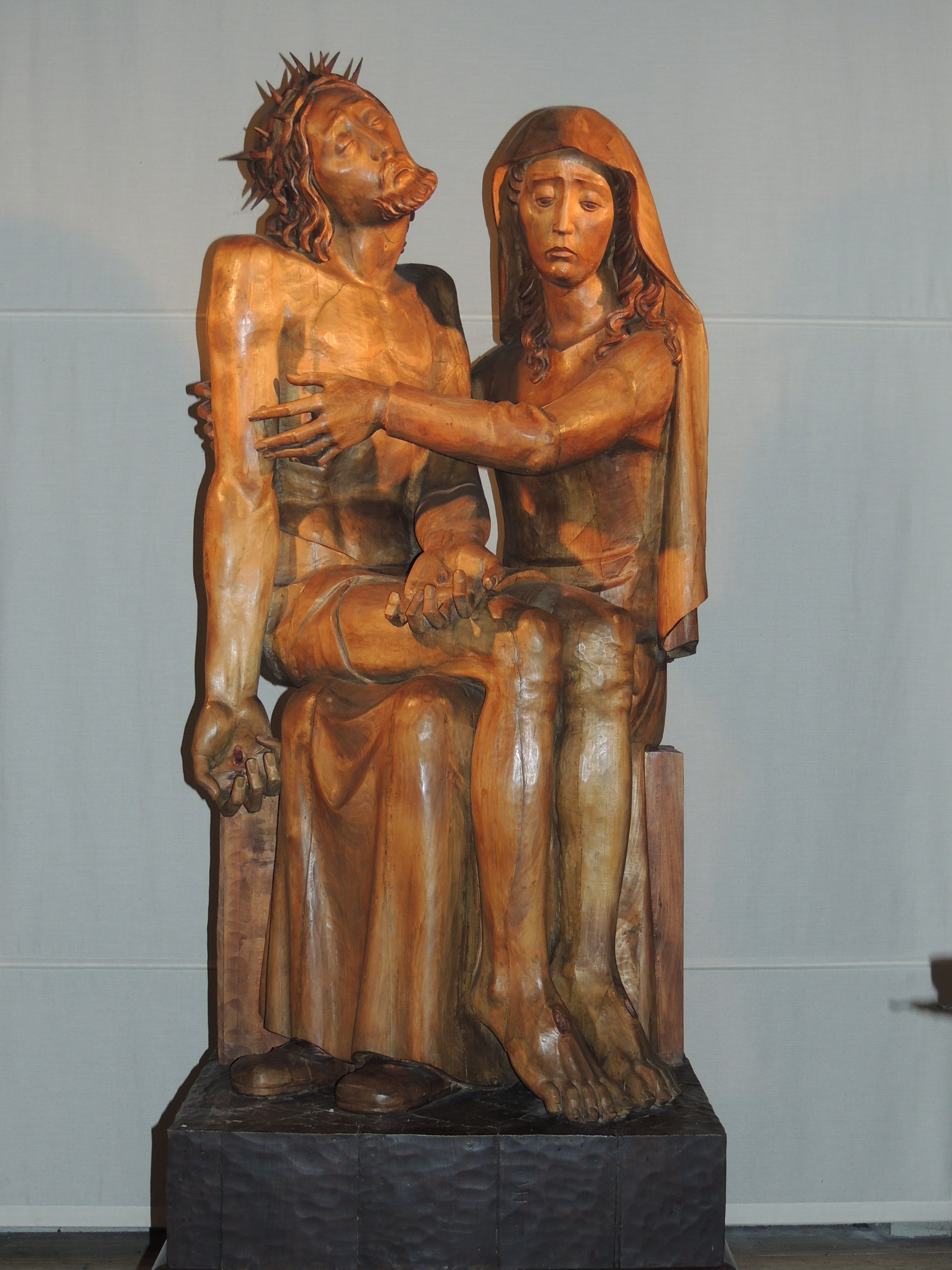
Pietà by Arnold Hensler and Otto Zirnbauer in its original place in the entrance hall

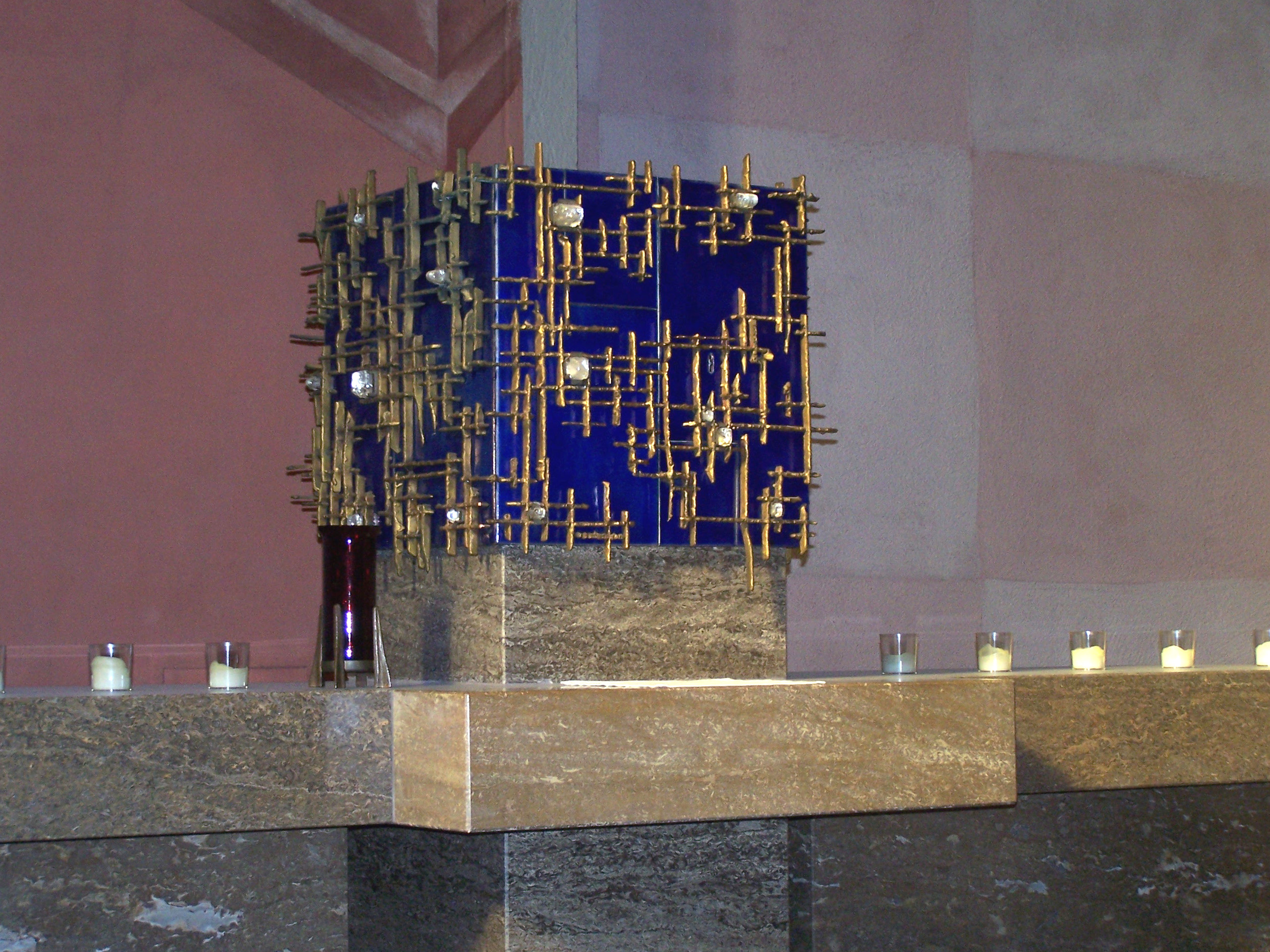
Blue enameled tabernacle from 1968

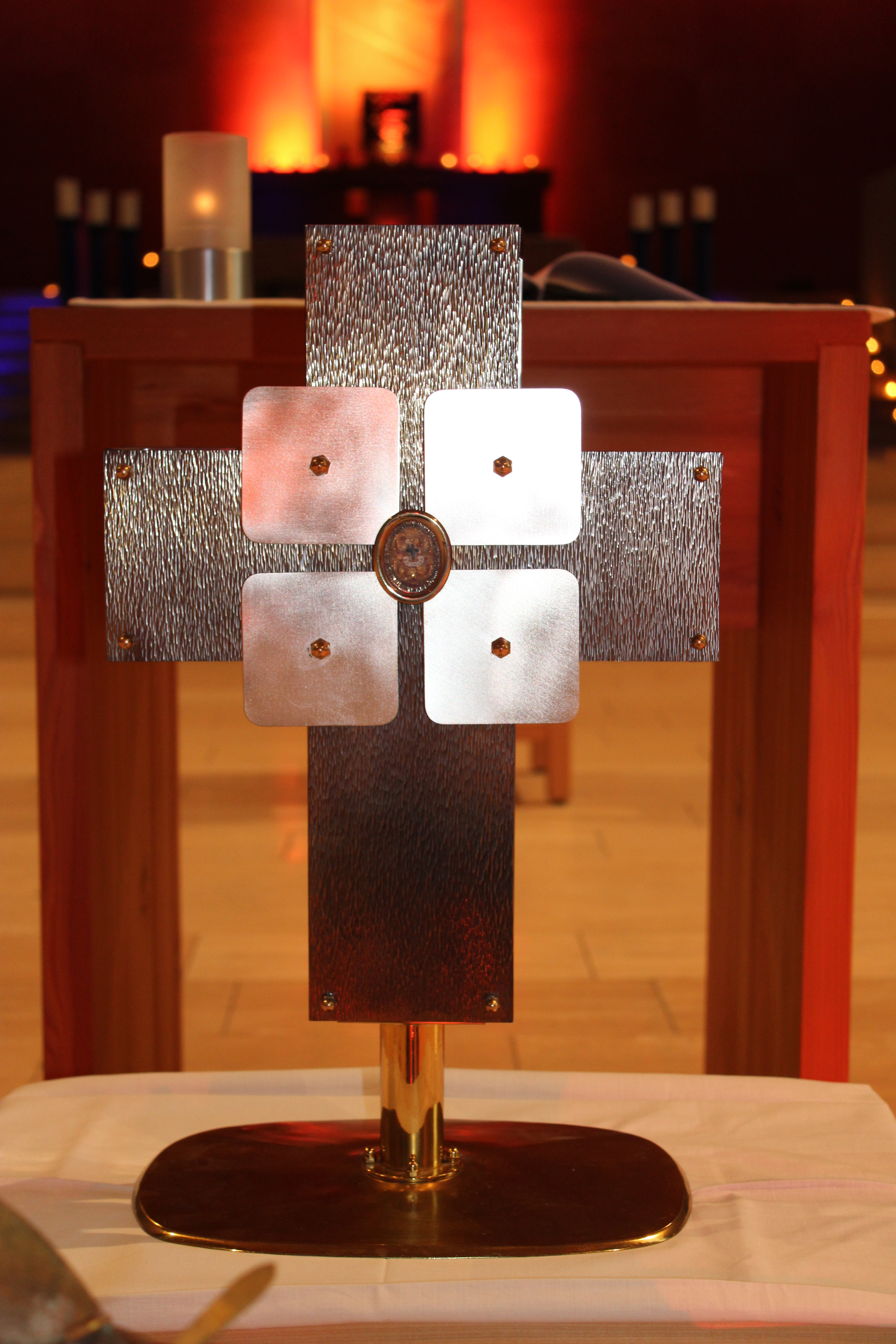
Reliquary containing a fragment of the Holy Cross

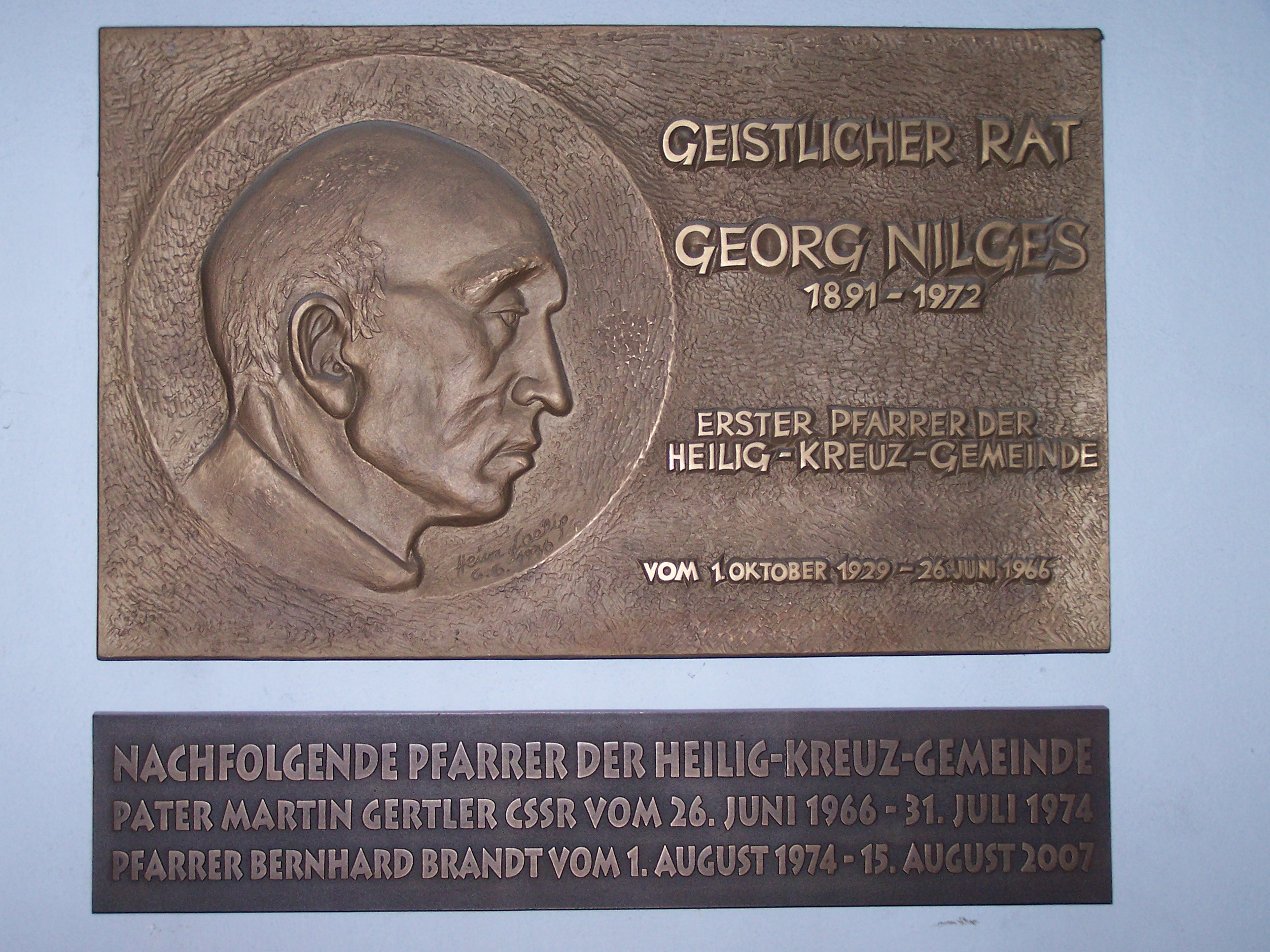
Commemorative plaque for the three parish priests inside the church

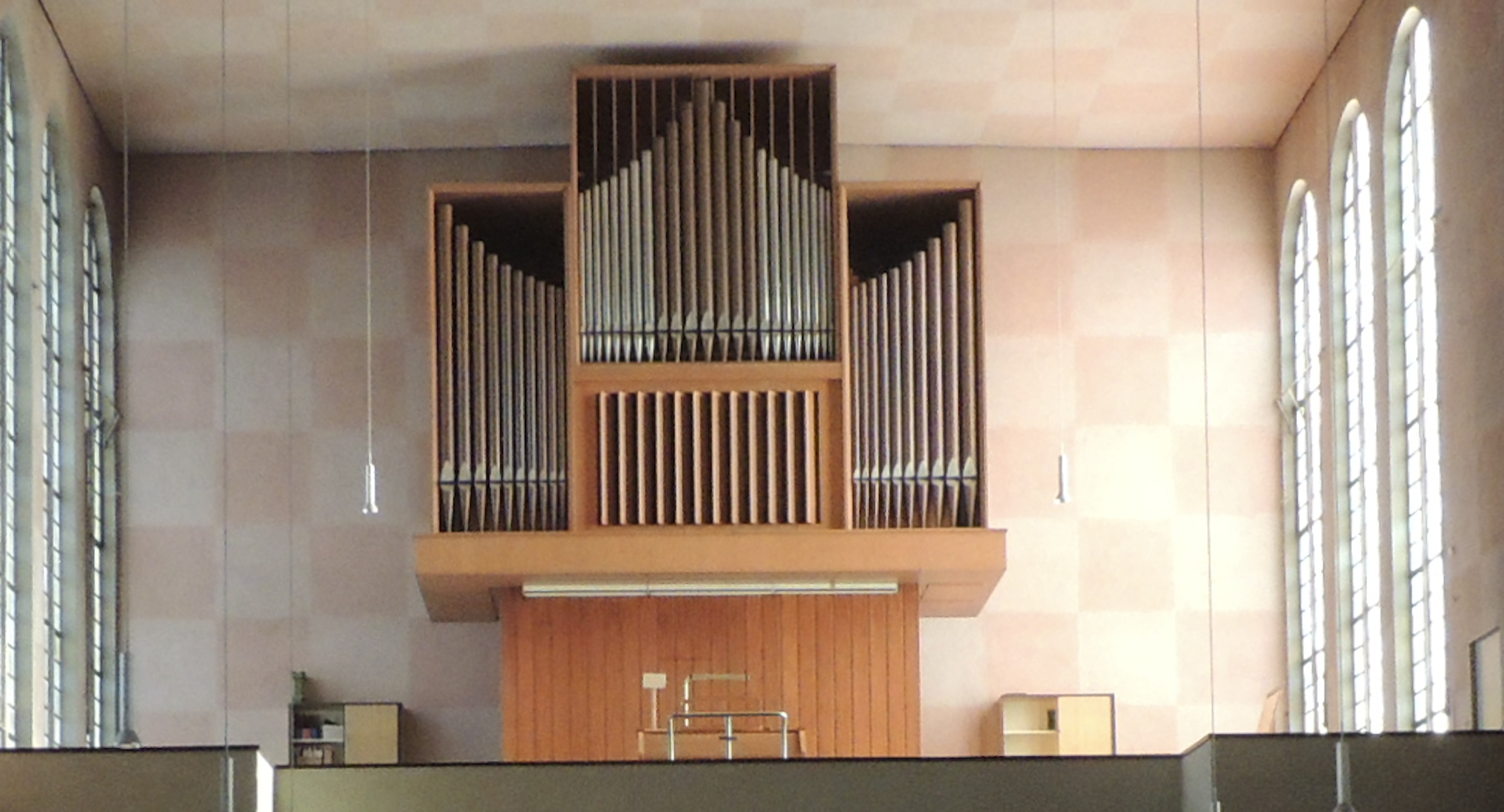
The organ on the gallery

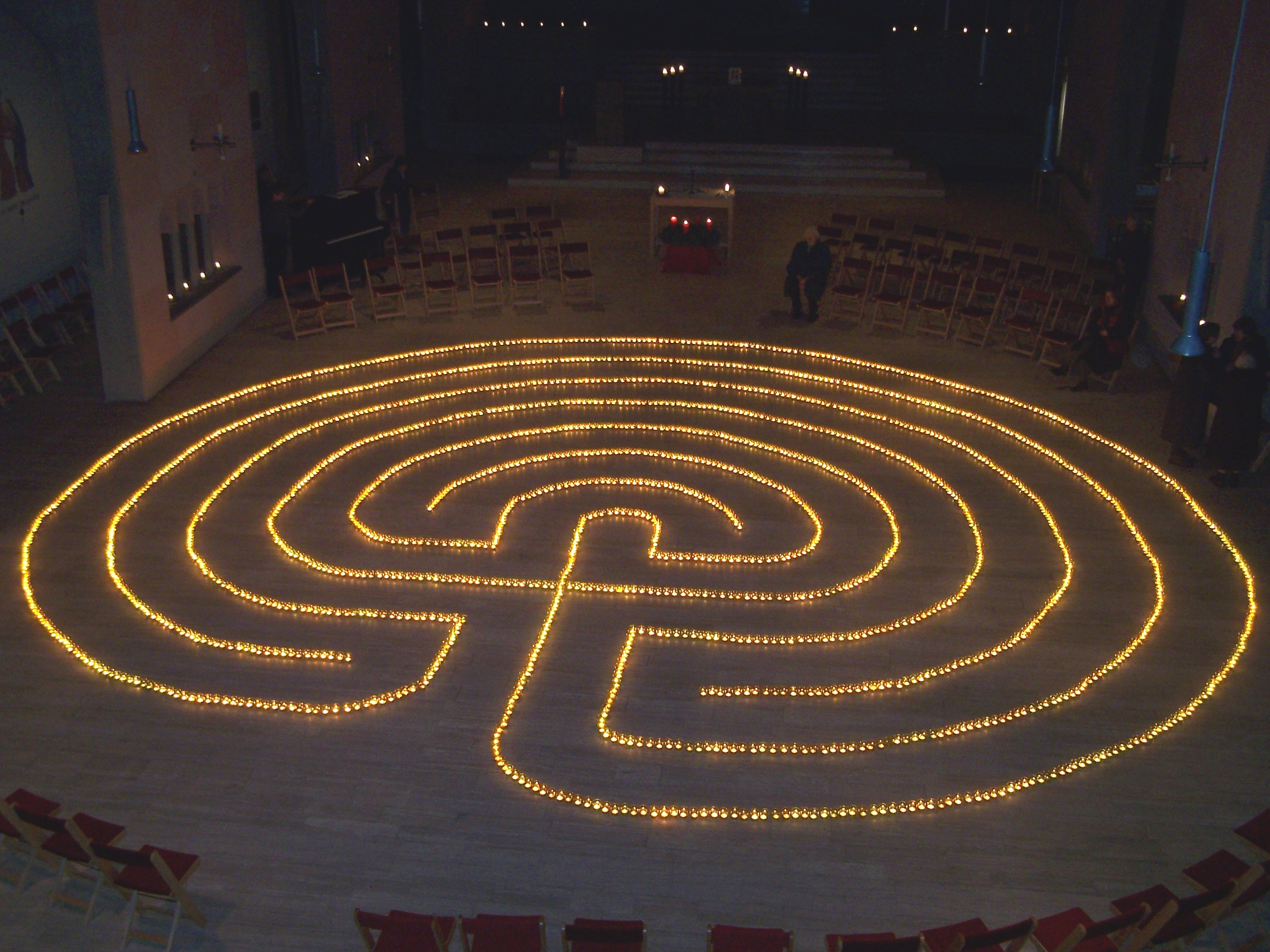
Advent-Labyrinth made with 2500 burning tealights the Saturday before Gaudete Sunday in 2011

Creation and use of Advent labyrinth in 2013

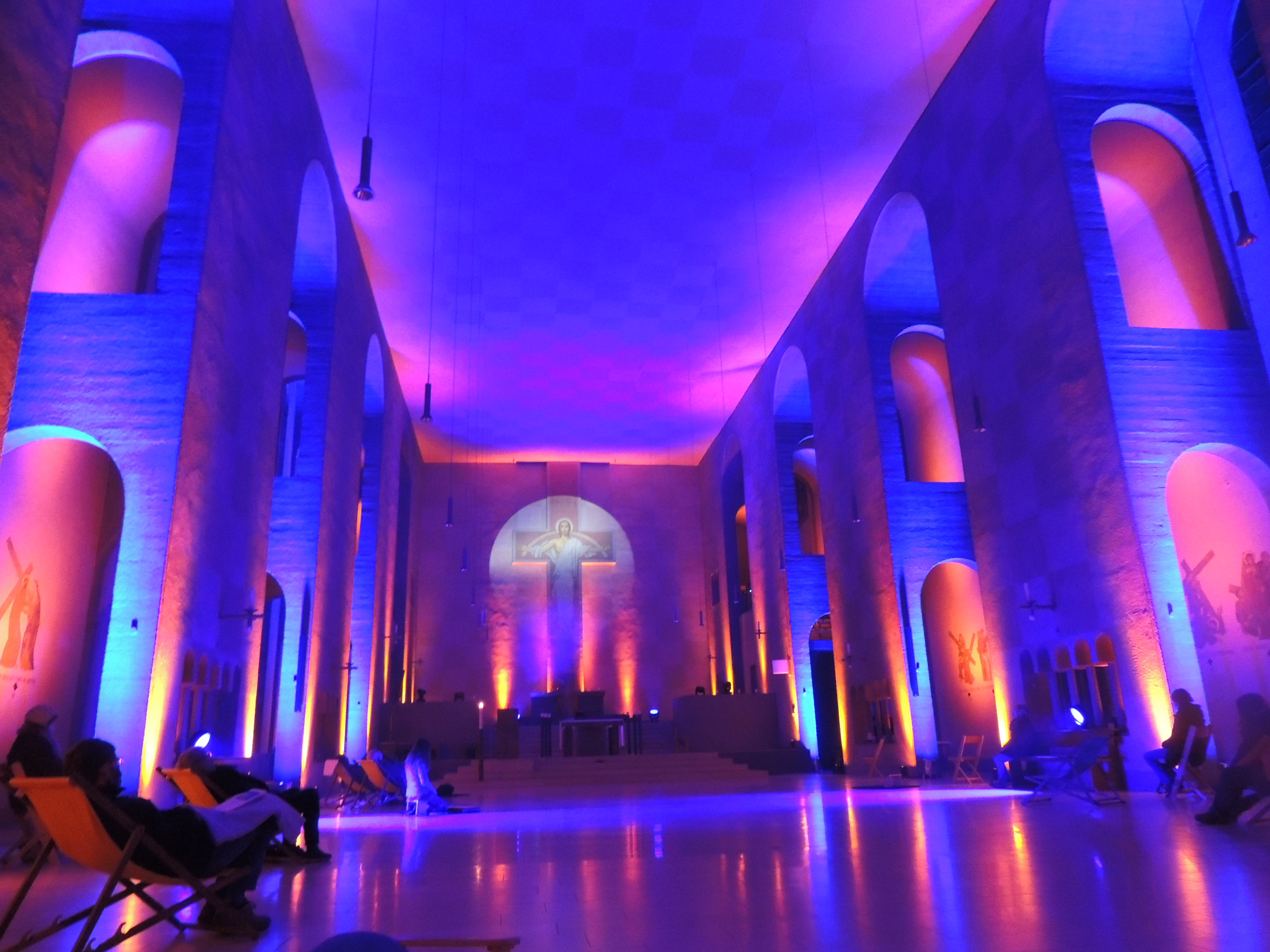
Part of the light show on the first advent weekend 2020 in the church ("Night Shimmer")

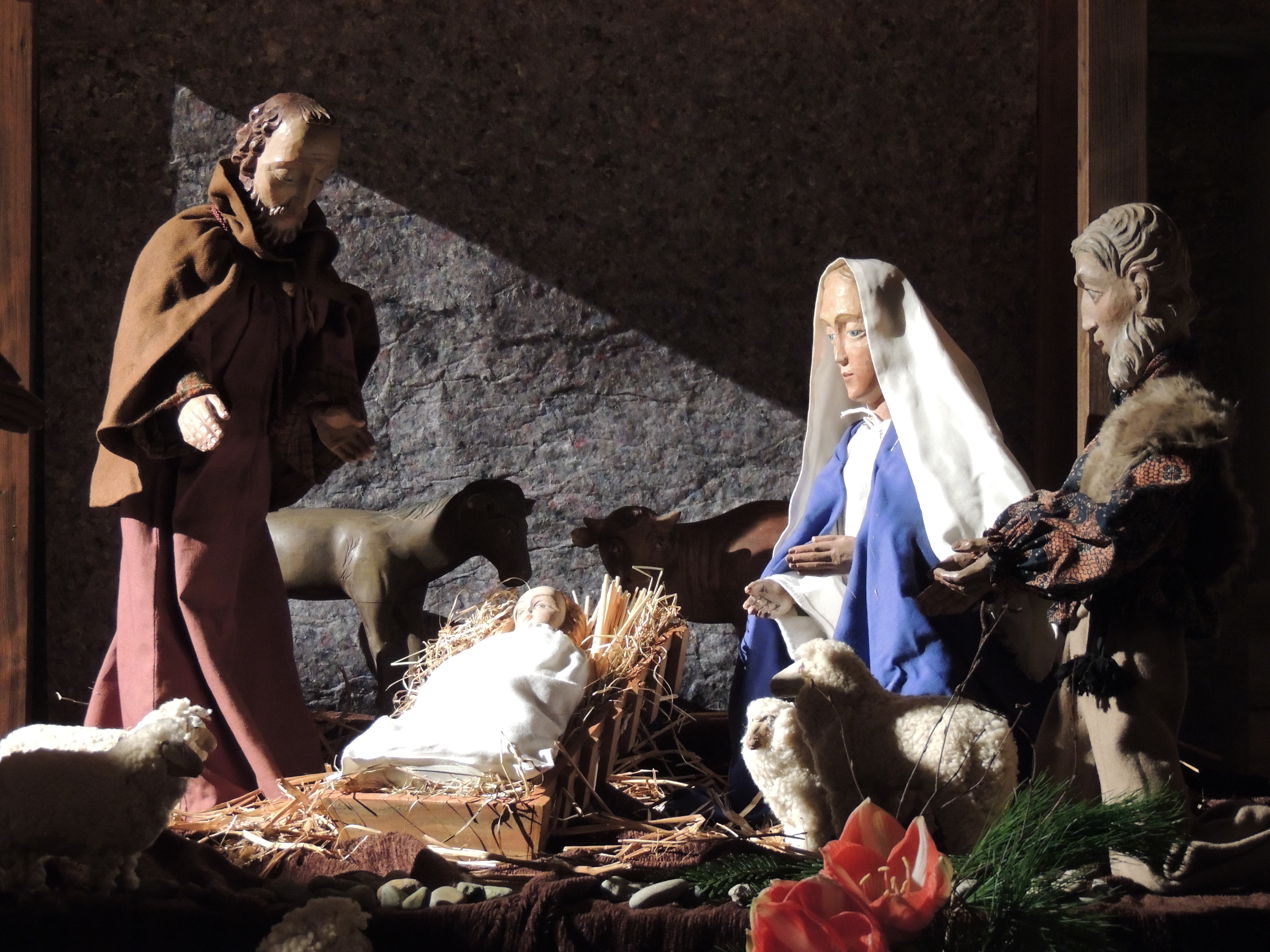
Nativity scene in 2011 with crib by Arnold Hensler and Otto Zirnbauer

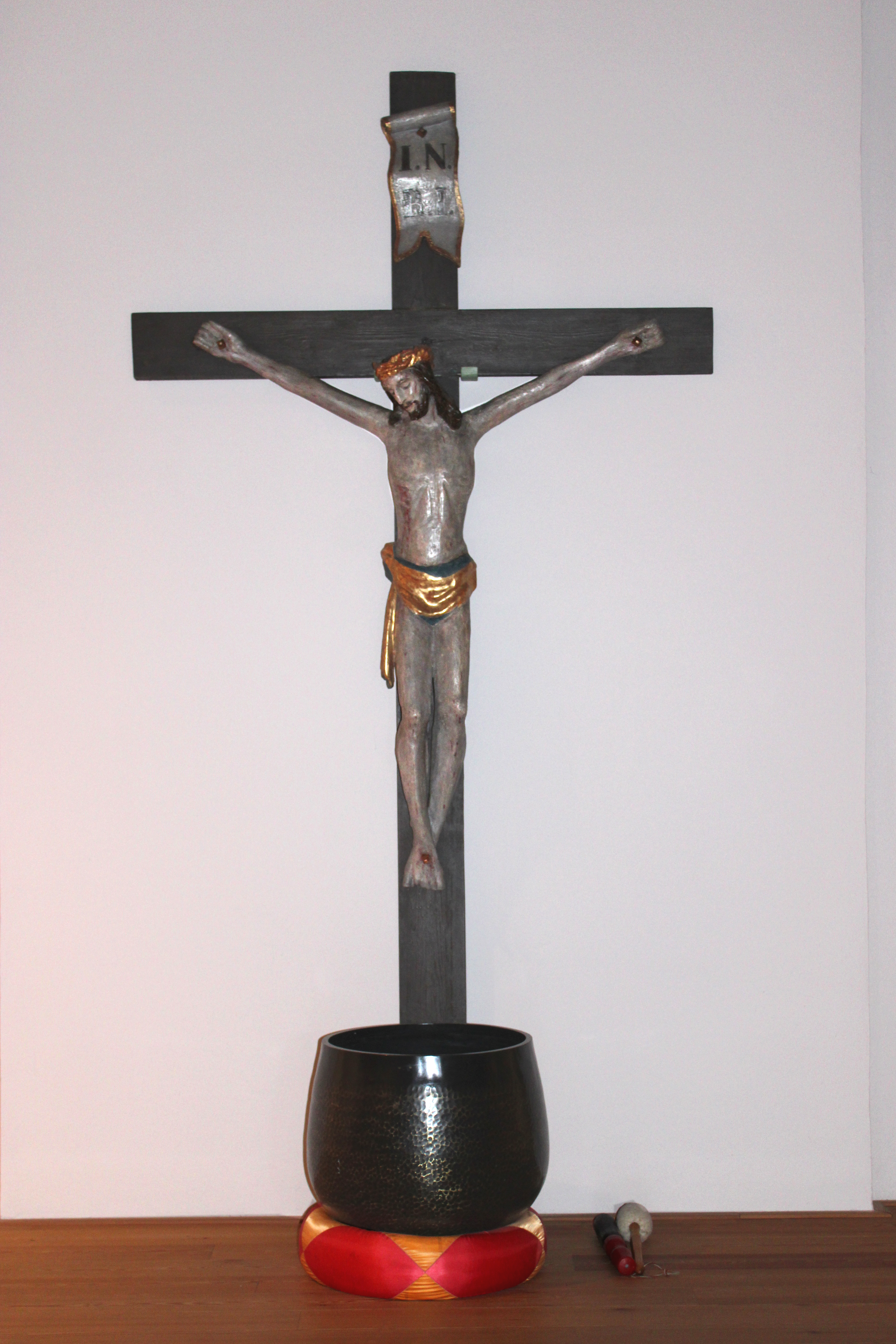
Wooden cruzifix in the crypt

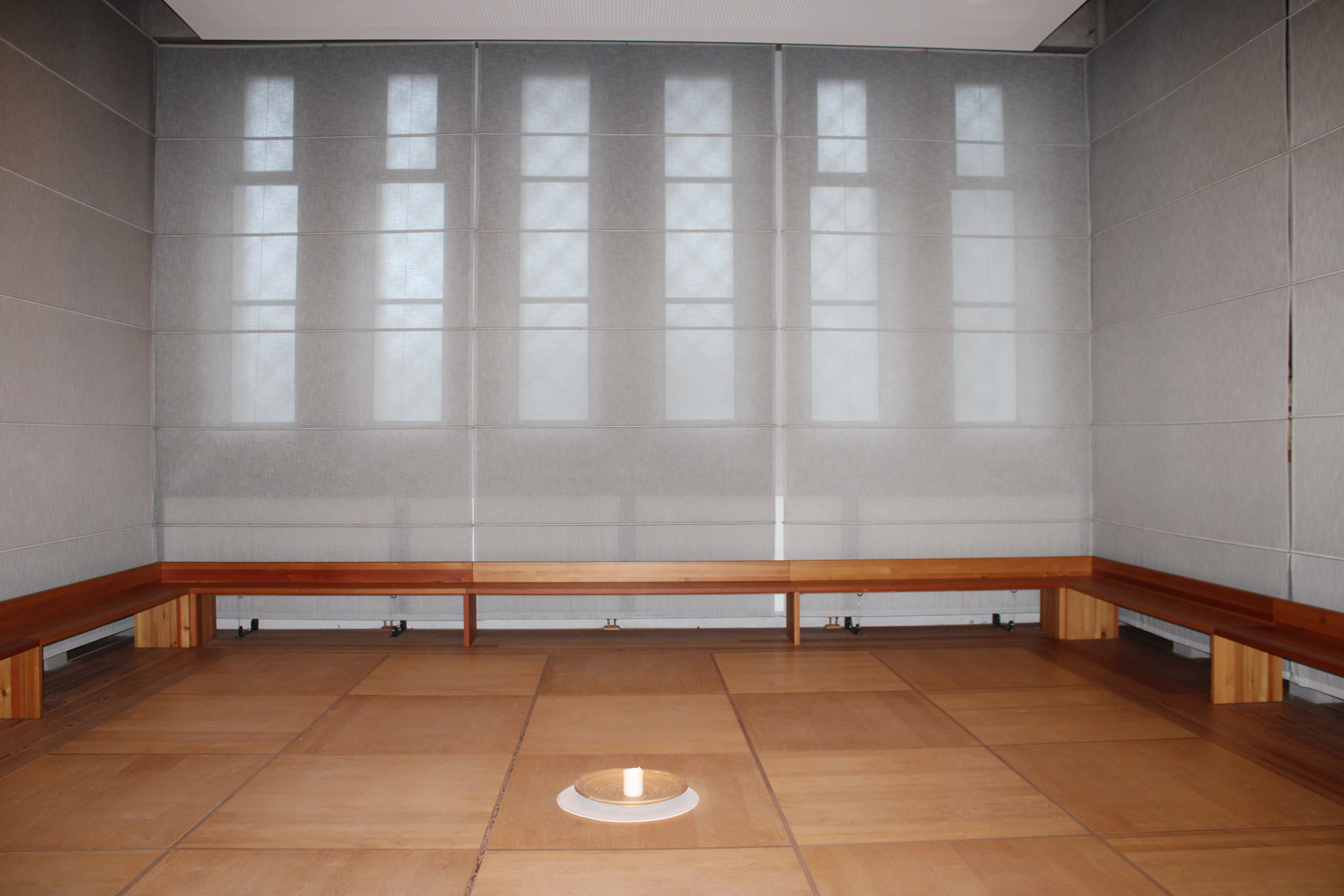
Meditation area in the crypt of the church

The Holy Cross church was built in 1929 by the master church builder Martin Weber and is at the edge of the housing development at the Bornheimer Hang. Weber also built the churches of St. Bonifatius in Frankfurt-Sachsenhausen in 1927 and of the Holy Spirit in Frankfurt-Riederwald in 1931. With these Frankfurt churches, alongside the Frauenfriedenskirche and the Pallottinerkirche St. Marien in Limburg an der Lahn, Martin Weber stands for "Neues Bauen" (=New Building Style) in the spirit of the Liturgical Movement in the Roman Catholic Church.

The church is located on the eastern edge of the settlement planned by Ernst May as part of the New Frankfurt (German: Neues Frankfurt) urban planning programme, above the Bornheimer Hang (=Bornheim slope). It is the most prominent church in New Frankfurt in terms of urban planning and, visible from afar, shapes the silhouette of the Bornheimer Hang settlement. On the side facing the city, the building forms the end point of Wittelsbacherallee, marking the end of the visual axis. However, it is not strictly axially symmetric, as the street turns right shortly before the portal to leave the wide steps of the church on the left. This urban design gesture is a mixture of representativeness and understatement and is exemplary of the style of New Frankfurt. The church is not an aloof structure, but blends seamlessly into the surrounding buildings. The white plastered façade matches the surrounding residential buildings of the settlement. The original four dials without numbers on the tower clocks, which can still be seen today on the front sides of the tower, can also be found on the former Frankfurt Großmarkthalle (=Frankfurt wholesale market hall) and other prominent buildings of New Frankfurt. Directly next to the church, the central laundry of the settlement was originally located in the archway above Ortenberger Strasse. Martin Weber took up Ernst May's clear design language and, with soaring round arches as a consistent design element both outside and inside, translated the essence of late Romanesque church architecture into the modern age. It blends seamlessly into May's modernism of New Frankfurt and yet stands out as a house of God. According to Helmut Schlegel, the church reflected the attitude to life of the public at the time of its creation, who, after the First World War and the global economic crisis in the 1930s, longed for new hope, space and grandeur.

The community centre originally planned for the Wittelsbacherallee was not built, so there was enough space to build the new church. The Holy Cross Church was the second Catholic church in Frankfurt-Bornheim. The parish was an outsourcing of the later neighbour fold St. Josef, the first Catholic church in Bornheim. The reason why their priest Joseph Höhler decided to build the new church at this location was the expansion of the Bornheim quarter eastward at the Bornheimer Hang, with the new settlement. This resulted in a growing number of Roman Catholics living in the quarter.

After the Catholic community had acquired the two plots of land totaling 6,200 m^{2} needed for the construction of the church in 1926 and 1927, the church executive committee decided in May 1927 to invite tenders for a closed architectural competition. Four architectural firms were invited: Hans (1872–1952) and Christoph Rummel (1881–1961) (Frankfurt), Richard Steidle (1881–1958) (Munich), Martin Weber (1890–1941) (Frankfurt), and Robert B. Witte (Dresden). The jury consisted of eight people, including the then parish priest, Pastor Höhler, as representative of the parish of St. Josef, the city planning officer Ernst May, and the architect Hans Herkommer. The competition had several stipulations for the church, e.g. the front of the steeple at the Wittelsbacherallee, between 700 and 800 seats, a high altar and two side altars and an organ loft for 150 people. On 3 August 1927 a jury decided in a competition for the draft with the name slope crown by the master church builder Martin Weber (1890–1941). Weber called the building model "slope crown", since the church should crown the Bornheimer Hang (slope).

On 19 February 1928 the construction work began with the turning of the first sod. The foundation stone was laid on 18 March 1928. A deed with text in the shape of a cross, two daily newspapers, a yearbook of Frankfurt Catholics, five Reichsmarks in various currencies, and a bottle of Rhine wine were walled into the foundation stone.

The topping-out ceremony was celebrated on 14 September 1928. On 25 August 1929 the church was consecrated by Ludwig Maria Hugo, the bishop of the Diocese of Mainz, because Augustinus Kilian, the bishop of the Diocese of Limburg at the time, was ill. The name was chosen because there were several places in medieval Frankfurt dedicated to the holy cross. One of these was the chapel of the Hospital of the Holy Cross which was donated in 1343 by Wicker Frosch. Together with the chapel of the monastery of St. Katharinen which was built in 1354, it formed a small double church, the predecessor building of the today's Evangelical-Lutheran Katharinen church. In Holy Cross Church there is a reliquary containing a splinter of the Holy Cross. Until 1950 the Holy Cross parish was financially still a part of the St. Josef parish, with which it has a common church executive committee.

==== Second World War ====
During the Nazi era (from 1933) the Holy Cross parish was suppressed by the Nazis, and it lost fold members during World War II. Because of its prominent location, the church was used as a point of reference for the navigation of the bombers of the USAAF and the RAF. The windows at the west side of the church were destroyed on 4 October 1943 in an attack intended for the water works near the cemetery of Bornheim and destroyed the housing estate's wash house. During the first large-scale attack on Frankfurt in the evening of the same day, the windows of the eastern side and the parsonage building were destroyed by a line of bombs which came down on the garden plots at the Bornheimer Hang. With the next large attack on the city on 29 January 1944 parsonage building was heavily damaged. On the night of the 18/19 March 1944 the church was hit by several incendiary bombs, which pierced the roof timberwork. The bombs were extinguished inside the church. On 11 December 1944 the church was hit by three high-explosive bombs on its west side, completely destroying the large open staircase on the west side of the church tower and partially destroying the temporary chapel behind it in what later became the tower hall on the ground floor of the tower building, tearing a large hole in the west side of the nave. Pastor Georg Nilges wanted to retrieve the eucharist from the temporary chapel, but jumped back and thus escaped the explosion of the two bombs that devastated the lower church and completely destroyed its sacristy. The entire inventory, including chalices, monstrance, and thurible, was destroyed. Afterwards, church services had to be held in the boiler room below the tower, known as the "catacomb," which was used as an air raid shelter. In addition to the air raids, there were also attacks by low-flying aircraft. On 29 March 1945, the first soldiers of the United States Army stood in front of the church.

==== Post-war period ====
The boiler room underneath the steeple was used until 1. July 1946 as church. During the reconstruction period, starting on 26 September 1948, in which the external appearance of the church was preserved, the parish hall beneath the church was used as a lower church, which at that time was still connected to what would later become the crypt, where the altar area was located. In 1950 Holy Cross became its own parish with its own church executive committee.

In 1951, the contract for the restoration of the church was awarded under the leadership of architect Harald Greiner. By 1952, the interior of the church had been restored to its original condition and freshly renovated, and the large open staircase on the west side of the tower had been rebuilt. The church windows were glazed new by the glass painter Lorenz Matheis with stained glass window in white and golden yellow colours. The walls and the ceiling were painted in a single light colour. 1957 the kindergarten in the west of the church was built. In 1965 a stage for events was built in the parish hall under the church ship during a renovation.

In 1968 the altar area was transformed, a consequence of the liturgy reformation by the Second Vatican Council. The high altar, which was reduced in size, with the relics of the two martyrs Laurence and Urban was moved further down from its previous position under the cross, without the previous marble tabernacle, so that the priest could celebrate mass facing the congregation. A stone lectern replaced the demolished pulpit. The boundary walls of the ambones on the left and right were each replaced by a guard rail. In the right-hand ambo, a new blue enamelled tabernacle decorated with gilded metal grilles and rock crystals was placed on a marble pedestal. The two side altars and the communion benches were removed. The baptismal font stood for 22 years at the former location of the altar under the large wall cross in the choir room. The ceiling was painted orange-red and the walls light beige. In 1969, the first parish council election took place. The dark pews were replaced with light wood benches in 1971. In 1975, the administrative council elected by the parish council replaced the church council.

In 1990, as part of a restoration project led by architect Bernhard Weber (1930–2000), the chancel underwent further redesign. The baptismal font was moved back to the entrance area of the church. In its previous location, a sacrament altar with a tabernacle was erected, taking the place of the former high altar. The main altar was shortened again and the altar level was extended into the congregation area, with the lectern placed on the left side of the altar level. In 1992, during the renovation of the church interior, the original condition of the interior painting with its chequerboard pattern in light and dark red was largely restored, the large wall cross was extended to the ceiling and the inscription INRI was added to the upper part, and the apses were given boundary walls again. In 1995, the parish garden on Kettelerallee was reduced in size by residential buildings. In 1997, the previously unnamed square in front of the church tower at the upper end of Wittelsbacherallee was redesigned and given the name Martin-Weber-Platz.

=== 21st century ===
==== Holy Cross – Centre for Christian Meditation and Spirituality ====
At 1. August 2007 the Roman Catholic Diocese of Limburg intended the church on instruction of former bishop Franz Kamphaus to the Holy Cross – Centre for Christian Meditation and Spirituality. The centre was a pastoral institution of the diocese under the responsibility of the Pastoral Care and Education Division, Pastoral Care and Development Department (as of 9/2025). In the centre church services, meditation courses, contemplative prayer, Zen-meditation courses, days of reflection, spiritual exercises, retreats, and other meetings are offered. The Padre Helmut Schlegel of the Franciscan takes the responsibility for the offers as director/conductor of the centre until July 2018 and as a priestly employee until June 2019. In November 2018 the theologian Samuel Stricker took over the leadership of the meditation centre and in August 2019 Olaf Lindenberg the role as a priestly employee. The team included colleagues like for example from the Medical Mission Sisters (MMS). Although the offerings of the centre are affected by Christianity the target audience includes humans of all Religious denominations, world views and cultures. The team published a program normally annual. It was the first institution of its kind in Germany. The Holy Cross Church was one of five profile churches of the Diocese of Limburg. Furthermore, there were besides the Centre for Mourning Counselling (German:Zentrum für Trauerseelsorge) in St.Michael in Frankfurt-Nordend as well founded in 2007 also the three youth churches (German: Jugendkirchen) Crossover in St. Hildegard in Limburg an der Lahn, Jona in St. Bonifatius in Frankfurt-Sachsenhausen and Kana in Maria-Hilf in Wiesbaden-Nordost which were founded already in 2005.

In the church, small changes were gradually implemented by 2010. The previous church pews have been replaced by folding chairs, which allowed a more flexible use of the available space. The present main altar was no longer used for the church services of the centre for meditation and has been replaced by a small wooden altar, which formed a circle with the folding chairs. Stairlifts or wheelchair ramps have been installed for barrier-free access to the church interior or other premises. The crypt and the rooms of the former parsonage were redesigned for the use as a meditation centre.

In March 2020, the centre's program had to be suspended because all worship services in Germany and thus all other events had to be cancelled due to the COVID-19 pandemic in Germany. However, at certain times the church was daily open for meditation for a limited number of people. In May services were resumed on Saturdays under special conditions. In Advent 2020, four theme weeks were held with a special light show, the Advent Labyrinth, the Peace Light and about light figures. In December 2020, a Protestant vicar of the Protestant Church in Hesse and Nassau was employed for the first time in a six-month special vicariate in the centre.

On 20 August 2025, it was announced that the meditation centre of the Diocese of Limburg would be closing at the end of the year with a celebration on the Saturday before the fourth Sunday of Advent, 20 December 2025, after more than 18 years. The future use of the premises in Heilig Kreuz had not yet been decided at that time. This is determined jointly by the Diocese of Limburg; the parish of St. Josef Frankfurt, in whose parish territory the Holy Cross Church is located; and the Association of Catholic Parishes in Frankfurt. Further details were announced at the beginning of December 2025 (see Current Use).

On 20 May 2025, a team from the diocese decided instead to establish a specialist centre for spirituality, whose location, venues and programme were not yet known at that time. The Missionary Medical Sisters continue to work in this facility. Provided that future use of Holy Cross Church is compatible with specific offerings from the Spirituality Centre, the intention at that time was that the centre could continue to use the church premises if necessary.

==== From the new parish of St. Josef to the parish of a new type ====
With the establishment of the Centre for Christian Meditation and Christian Spirituality, the Holy Cross Church lost its previous role as a parish church. Thus, the former municipal territory of the Holy Cross parish belonged again to the parish of St. Josef from which the parish once emanated. The two Catholic Bornheim congregations, with a part of the parish territory of the previous parish of St. Michael, were united to form the new parish of St. Josef. The Church of St. Michael in Frankfurt-Nordend became the Zentrum für Trauerseelsorge (=Centre for Mourning Counselling) of the Diocese of Limburg. The parish of St. Josef in Bornheim and the neighbouring parish of Maria Rosenkranz (=Mary Rosary) in Frankfurt-Seckbach formed the common pastoral area Frankfurt-Bornheim. Together with their neighbours Maria Rosenkranz in Frankfurt-Seckbach, the new St. Josef parishioners formed the pastoral area Frankfurt-Bornheim until 31 December 2011, in which a stronger cooperation than before took place. The parish of St. Josef was at this time with almost 11,000 Catholics one of the largest in the Diocese of Limburg. On 1 January 2012 the pastoral rooms in Frankfurt were reorganized and from the two pastoral areas of Frankfurt-Bornheim with the parishes of St. Josef-Bornheim and Maria Rosenkranz in Seckbach and Frankfurt-Ost with the two parishes of Heilig-Geist (=Holy Spiritin Frankfurt-Riederwald and Herz-Jesu (=Heart of Jesus) in Frankfurt-Fechenheim, a new pastoral area called Frankfurt-Ost was created. It existed until 31 December 2014.

On 1 January 2015, a parish of the new type under the name of St. Josef Frankfurt am Main was founded from the four parishes of the pastoral area Frankfurt-Ost St. Josef in Bornheim, Maria Rosenkranz in Seckbach, Heilig-Geist in Riederwald and Herz-Jesu in Fechenheim with the church places of Sankt Josef Bornheim, Maria Rosenkranz Seckbach, Heilig-Geist Riederwald and Herz-Jesu Fechenheim. This includes the centralization of certain tasks, such as the parish secretariat. The parish now has about 16,500 members. By its location in the parish of the new parish of St. Josef Frankfurt am Main, it was also their branch church again from 2007 bis 2015. The buildings are managed by the Catholic City Church of Frankfurt am Main.

== Building ==
=== Tower Building ===
The church, with its steel frame construction, is covered by two flat gabled roofs on the nave and tower. It is accessed via a large flight of 24 steps on Wittelsbacherallee. The church interior is located one floor above street level. Martin Weber conceived the floor plan of the church as a further development of the floor plan of St. Boniface's Church in Frankfurt-Sachsenhausen.

The tower building has three arcades on each of its west and east sides, each covering almost the entire height, with a turret clock without numerals in the right-hand arcade, which opens onto the square on the south side of the tower in a fourth arcade. Beneath the arcades on the west side, there is a narrow forecourt with three metal doors leading to the foyer in front of the entrance hall. On the east is a loggia, which was intended as an outdoor pulpit. Above this are two floors, each with three arched windows for the gallery and the bell frame. The tower has seven floors from the bottom up: boiler room, tower hall, tower lobby, choir loft, organ loft, belfry and the level for the bell ringing machinery and clockwork. There are large crosses on the roof of the western and eastern front walls of the tower and on the ridge of the roof on the north side. The tower crosses and the roof cross on the nave are designed in Martin Weber's typical width-to-height ratio of 1:4 (1.50 × 6.00 metres) (‘Weber cross’).

At the southern external wall of the tower building ends the bell chair basic girder in four winged animal figures with the heads of a human, a lion, a bull and an eagle. They symbolize the four evangelists Matthew, Mark, Luke and John. On the four girders is an inscription with a text from the First Epistle to the Corinthians 1 Cor 1:23–24: Wir aber predigen Christus den Gekreuzigten, Christus Kraft und Gottes Weisheit (=But we preach Christ crucified, Christ the power of God, and the wisdom of God). Below the four animal figures is a plaster relief of the Veil of Veronica. The relief and animal figures, as well as the rest of the exterior decoration, were created by the sculptor Arnold Hensler from Wiesbaden.

The church has a three-part peal of bells. In 1955, the peal of bells in the newly built Protestant Heilandskirche [=Church of the Savior) was adapted to that of the Holy Cross Church and the Johanniskirche (=St. John's Church), so that all three peal of bells could sound together without disharmony.

Directly beneath the eaves are seven slit-shaped sound openings, which were also used to attach long yellow and white church flags. The exterior design of the tower has not changed in the first century of its existence. Only the clocks in the south-eastern and north-western arcades, as well as the halos of the evangelists depicted with animal bodies on the south side are no longer there.

=== Nave ===
The nave aligned precisely in a north–south direction so that, when viewed from the west, the tower appears as the dominant end point of Wittelsbacherallee. The chancel is located at the north end of the nave. After their inauguration, the interior was first painted red-pink plaid. The original windows bore large letters inside. It was a German translation of the Latin hymn Vexilla Regis (Des Kreuzes Zeichen zieht einher, =The banners of the king issue forth). The letters appeared dark in the day before the light shining from the outside through the windows. In the night they shone through the reflection of the light of the church illumination. On the northern exterior of the nave is the circular inscription ‘Im Kreuz ist Heil’ (=In the Cross is Salvation), designed by Arnold Hensler.

In Holy Cross Church, the chancel is located at the front wall of the nave. In the church St. Bonifatius in Frankfurt-Sachsenhausen, the altar is located in its own chancel, and the church Heilig-Geist in Frankfurt-Riederwald has in contrast to this a centrally located chancel.

In World War II the church and the adjoining parsonage in the Kettelerallee were damaged by several bomb hits. The church windows were destroyed in 1943 by the blast waves of bomb explosions nearby. The large main staircase at the tower was destroyed in 1944 by a bomb hit and the church roof of fire bombs. After reconstruction, the interior of the church was given a light coat of paint on the walls and ceiling in 1951. In 1968, the walls were painted light beige and the ceiling orange-red. In the 1990s, the original chequerboard pattern was restored. The new church windows were re-glazed in a yellowish hue beginning in 1951. The two side altars were removed in 1968. In addition, there were until this year a total of five side chapels in the church between the pillars in the inner church and the two side walls of the church ship. They were dedicated to various saints, such as Saint Elizabeth, Saint Rita and Saint Agnes. Behind the left front pillar was the staircase leading up to the pulpit, which also was removed in 1968 and had a rectangular sounding board. The church was put under cultural heritage management in 1986 together with its location and the assignment to the Ernst May settlement around the church. In 1990 extensive renovations were begun, in which the altar area was redesigned and the interior was restored to its original chequerboard pattern in 1992, also for reasons of cultural heritage management.

Under the church is the crypt, which was subjected to a major renovation and transformation to a meditation room because of the founding of the Centre for Christian Meditation and Spirituality. Among other things, the floor was provided with a parquetry made of larch wood and the actual meditation area was provided with panels of linen and a door frame made of wood as an access. On the south wall of the crypt is a wooden crucifix with a size of 183 x 138 cm. Presumably it originates originally from the Alps of the 17th or 18th century. It comes from the Nachlass of the wife May (née Ethel Mary Villers Forbes of the House of the Earl of Granard, Plymouth) of the Jewish entrepreneur Carl von Weinberg. She died in 1937, and knew the first parish priest of Holy Cross Georg Nilges from his time as a chaplain in Frankfurt-Niederrad.

Next to the crypt is a large auditorium with a stage, the parish hall of the former Holy Cross parish. In the foot of the tower building, which consists of seven floors, there is also the tower hall (German: Turmsaal), which is still used by the new parish of St. Josef Frankfurt am Main. On the outer walls of the side aisles, the inside of the left front partition of the left side aisle to the church room and the rear wall of the entrance hall in the tower building is a painted Stations of the Cross of 1932 created by the artist Georg Poppe. The penultimate (13th) station of the Stations of the Cross was until 2020 the Pietà made of wood by the sculptor Arnold Hensler and Otto Zirnbauer. In 2020, after a stay at an Arnold Hensler exhibition in the Diocesan Museum in Limburg, the Pietà was moved to a new location about halfway up the nave. On the altar side, there is a large cross that was redesigned during the reconstruction completed in 1952, on which there is a painting of the rising Jesus, which also thematically forms the conclusion of the Stations of the Cross. Until World War II, there were two large painted angels on the wall to the left and right of the cross. The gold-coloured crown hanging above the cross on the ceiling, which could be illuminated from below, was also not restored.

=== Further buildings ===
On property are in addition the 1957 established kindergarten, a parsonage building with a parish office and dwellings, a building with group and club areas, as well as a football pitch used by young people. The parish kindergarten of St. Josef was expanded in 2011 by another building in the former parish court on Ortenberger Straße.

== Organ ==
In 1964 the organ building company Gebr. Späth Orgelbau installed a typical pipe organ for this time. The tracker action works electrically, the organ stop loops are electro-pneumatically controlled. The organ was cleaned and overhauled in 2019 by the successor companies Freiburger Orgelbau Hartwig und Tilmann Späth. The freestanding organ console was completely redesigned and equipped with new organ stop rockers and LED-lighting fixtures. The electrics were partially renewed, as well as the leather of the bellows, the membranes and other electro-pneumatic parts. The wind chests were overhauled and the wind supply stabilised by new bellows controls and a new motor. On the tonal level, the post-voicing gave the organ more character and softened loud sharpness. After the reconstruction and reversion, the Pommer 16' sounded as the supporting drone.

I. Main C-g^{3}
1.	Bordun	16'
2.	Principal	8'
3.	Gems Horn	8'
4.	Octave	4'
5.	Tube Flute	4'
6.	Nasat	2 2/3'
7.	Octave	2'
8.	Mixture	six to eightfold
9.	Trumpet	8'

II. Swell C-g^{3}
10.	Couple Flute	8'
11.	Quintade	8'
12.	Principal	4'
13.	Night Horn	4'
14.	Schwiegel	2'
15.	Sifflute	1 1/3'
16.	Sesquialter	double
17.	Sharpen mixture	fourfold
18.	Schalmeyoboe	8'

Pedal C-f1
19.	Subbass	16.
	Zartbass	16' TM I.
20.	Principal Bass	8'
21.	Covered Bass	8'
22.	Noise Bass	fourfold
23.	Trombone	16'

- Coupler (Organ): II-I, I-P, II-P, Sub II-I, Super II-I
- Music play help: 2 free combinations, 1 free pedal combination, crescendo roller, tutti, trigger, slider chest, electric action, electropneumatic stop action

== Transport connections ==
The Holy-Cross-Church could easily be reached by walk in one minute from the tram stop Ernst-May-Platz of the tramline 14 of the Frankfurt tramway and the Stadtbahn station Eissporthalle/Festplatz of the line U7 of the Frankfurt light rail system (German: Frankfurt U-Bahn). Bus line 38 connects the sports centre (SCB) of the Turngemeinde Bornheim sports club and the Bornheimer Hang settlement with the district centre and the neighboring district of Seckbach. Also not far away is the motorway exit Frankfurt-Ost of the Federal Motorway 661 (German: Bundesautobahn 661).

== Camino de Santiago ==
Beneath the Bornheimer Hang at the eastern side of the church a branch of the German Camino de Santiago (Way of St. James) runs along. The route is based on the ancient trade route from Leipzig to Frankfurt am Main (Des Reiches Straße). The way starts in the bishop city Fulda and leads through Schlüchtern, Steinau an der Straße, Bad Soden-Salmünster, Gelnhausen, Langenselbold, Erlensee and Bruchköbel. It belongs to the net of main routes of the pilgrim of St. James in Europe which are leading to the grave of the saint in the cathedral of Santiago de Compostela. This branch which is 116 km long passes the Holy-Cross-Church and leads through the Ostpark and then passes the Seat of the European Central Bank at the former Großmarkthalle (Wholesale Market Hall) on its route to the Main river and the inner city of Frankfurt am Main. It passes also the Eiserner Steg (a footbridge made of iron) and leads further to Mainz and afterwards to Trier.

== Trivia ==
=== Novel ===
A Frankfurt-based scene of the 1999 novel Die Türkin (=The Turk) of the German writer Martin Mosebach, awarded with the Heimito von Doderer-Literaturpreis, was inspired by the Holy Cross Church. The described scenery around the "chiricoesque basilica" resembles the Holy Cross Church on the Bornheimer Hang.

=== Television film ===
At the end of June 2019, a confession different scenes for the Sat.1-television film Mörderische Tage – Julia Durant ermittelt (=Murderous days – Julia Durant investigates) in the Julia Durant series by Andreas Franz and Daniel Holbe with actress Sandra Borgmann in the title role was shot by the director Nicolai Rohde in the Holy Cross Church as a film set. The script was written by Kai-Uwe Hasenheit and Andreas Bareiss. For the shooting, chairs with black seats and backrests were set up inside the church by the film crew, as well as a custom-made confessional, which incorporates design elements and colour schemes from church doors. Inside it can be seenn for example the wall painting of a grave scene in the entrance area, the pipe organ and the confessional as a film setting. Several times the perron and the houses of the settlement at Bornheimer Hang in opposite in the Ortenberger Street can be seen. In addition, drone images of the tower building were used. The television film was first broadcast on 10 November 2019 on Sat.1 emotions and on 11 November 2019 on Sat.1.
