= Riedewald =

Riedewald is a surname. Notable people with the surname include:

- Harold Riedewald (died 1982), Surinamese lawyer
- Jaïro Riedewald (born 1996), Dutch footballer

== See also ==
- Riederwald, district of Frankfurt, Germany
