= Herz Jesu Fechenheim =

Church in Hesse, Germany

Herz Jesu
- Herz Jesu Fechenheim
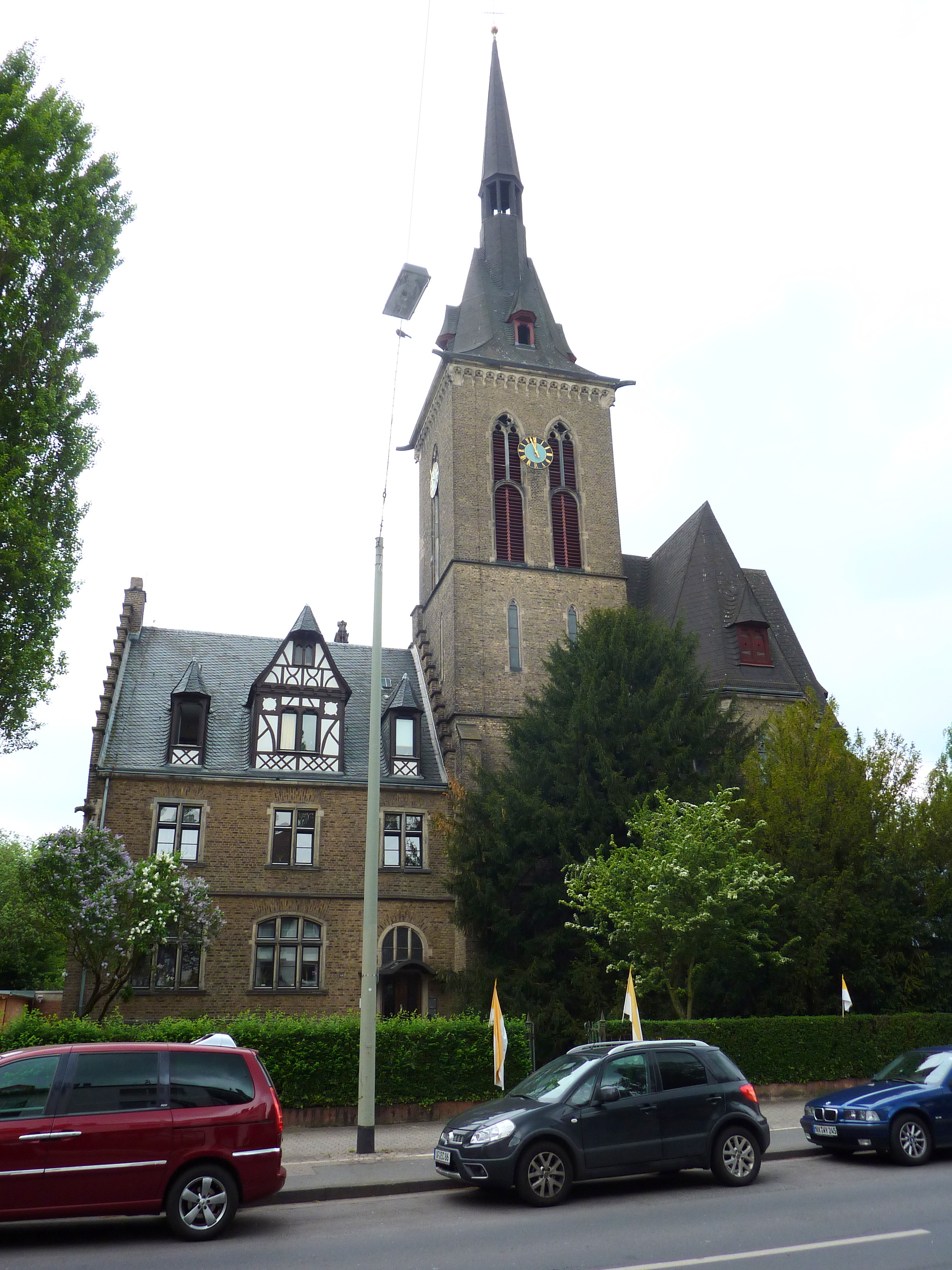
- View from the east

- Location within Hesse
- 50°07′36″N 8°46′04″E
- Location: Fechenheim
- Country: Germany
- Denomination: Catholic
- Website: www.herzjesufechenheim.de

History
- Status: church
- Dedication: Sacred Heart
- Consecrated: 4 May 1896
- Events: restoration 1984/85

Architecture
- Architect: Max Meckel
- Style: Gothic revival

Administration
- Diocese: Diocese of Limburg
- Parish: St. Josef Frankfurt am Main

Herz Jesu Fechenheim (Sacred Heart, literally: Heart of Jesus, German: Herz-Jesu-Kirche) is a Catholic church in the suburb Fechenheim of Frankfurt am Main, Hesse, Germany. The parish church of the Fechenheim congregation is part of the Roman Catholic Diocese of Limburg. On 1 January 2015 the parish became a Kirchort (church location), part of the parish St. Josef Frankfurt am Main.

== History ==
The church was built from 1895 to 1896 after a design by the architect Max Meckel in Gothic revival style. It was consecrated on 4 May 1896. Fechenheim was then independent and belonged to the Diocese of Fulda. When Fechenheim became part of Frankfurt in 1929, it came to the Diocese of Limburg.

The church was damaged by the bombing of Frankfurt on 2 March 1944. It was rebuilt with simpler interior style. In a renovation in 1984/85, part of the original interior design was restored, including vaults in one of the two naves.

On 1 January 2015, four parishes were combined to St. Josef, with locations (Kirchort) St. Josef, Maria Rosenkranz, Heilig Geist and Herz Jesu.
