= Maria Rosenkranz, Frankfurt =

Maria Rosenkranz
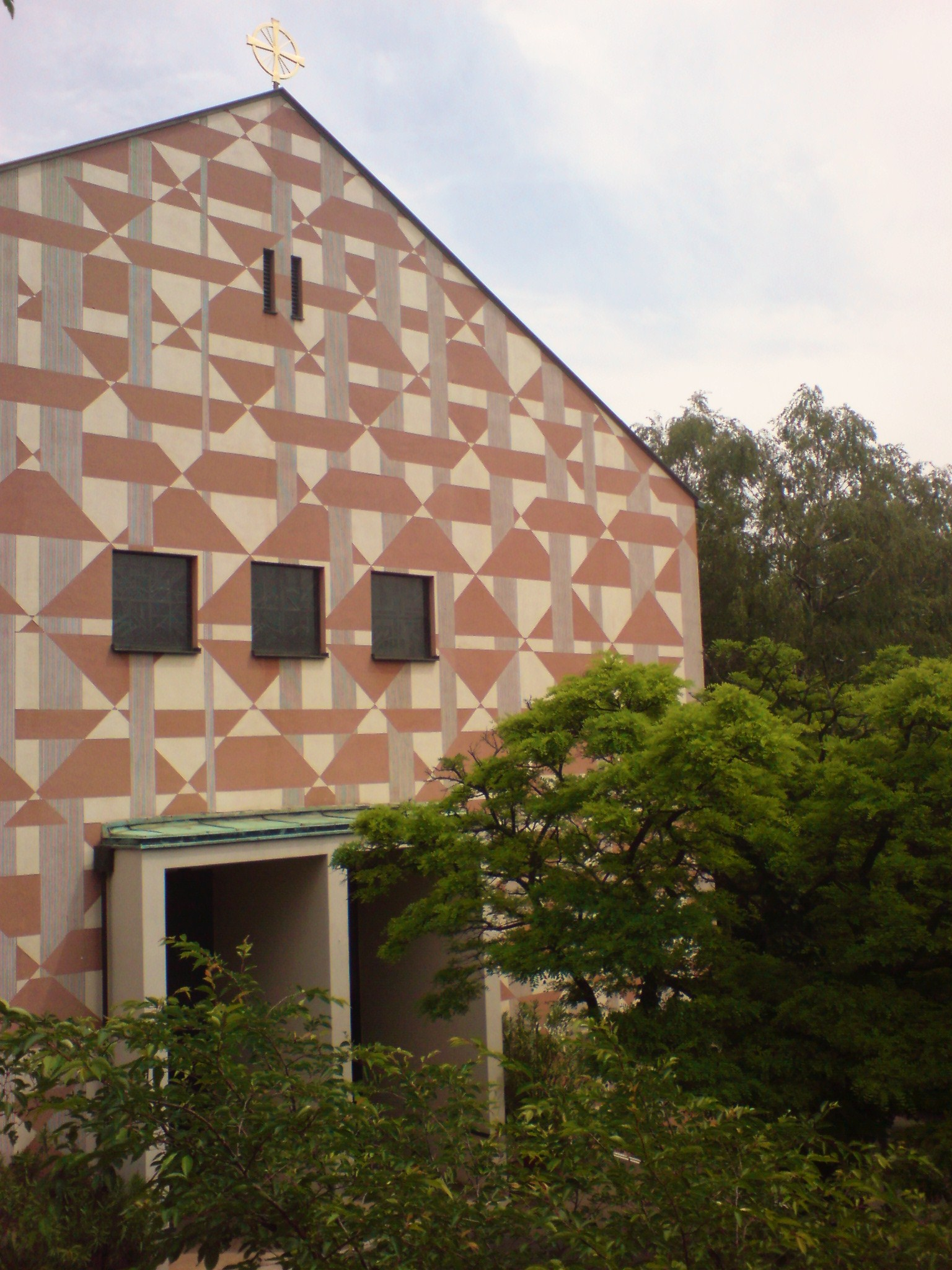
- Facade of the church

- 50°08′28″N 8°43′18″E
- Location: Frankfurt-Seckbach, Hesse
- Country: Germany
- Denomination: Catholic
- Website: www.mariarosenkranz.de

History
- Status: Parish church
- Dedication: Maria Rosenkranz
- Consecrated: 1953

Architecture
- Functional status: Active
- Architects: Heinrich Horvatin; Carl Rummel

Administration
- Province: Cologne
- Diocese: Limburg

Maria Rosenkranz (Mary Rosary) is a Catholic church in Frankfurt-Seckbach, part of Frankfurt am Main. It was completed in 1953. On 1 January 2015 the parish became a Kirchort (church location), part of the parish St. Josef Frankfurt am Main. The parish church of the Seckbach congregation is part of the Roman Catholic Diocese of Limburg.

== Logos ==
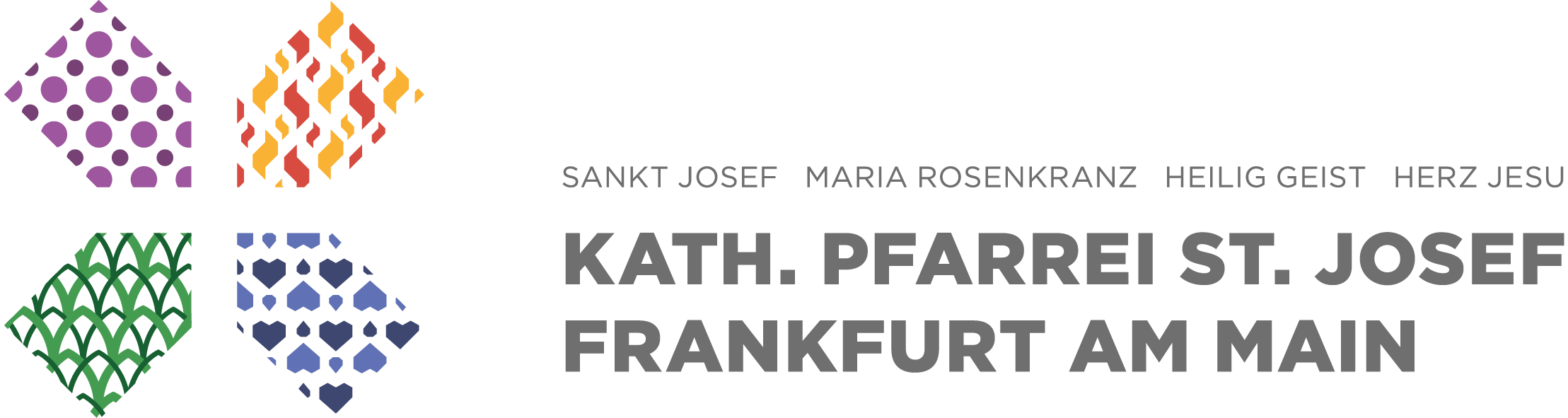
Logo of the Parish of St. Josef Frankfurt am Main

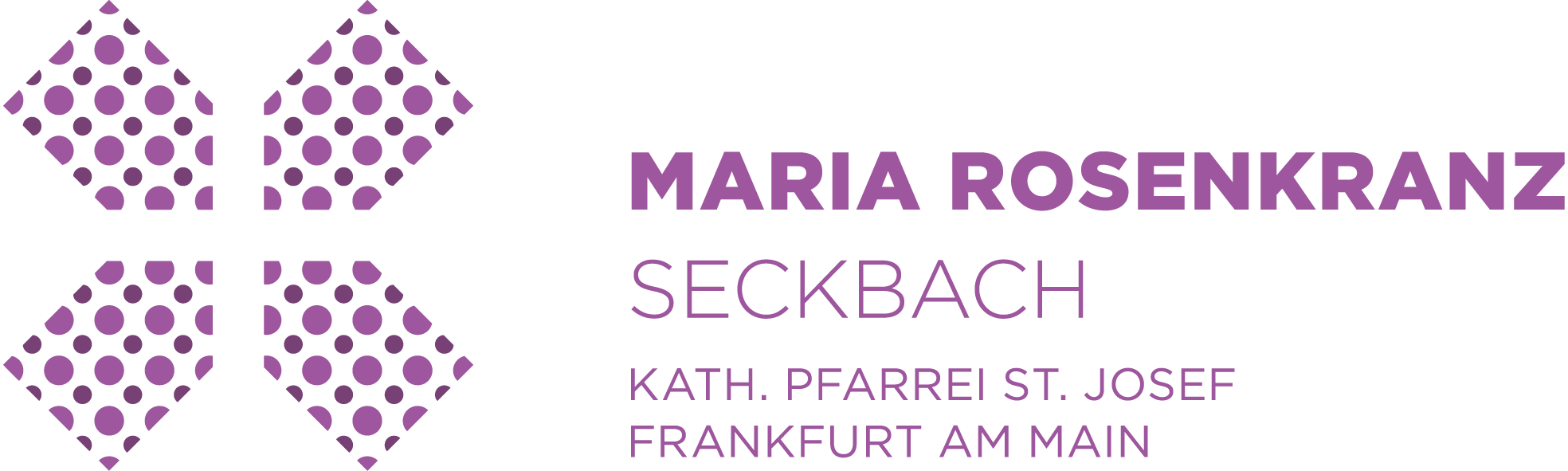
Logo of the church location

Logo of the Roman Catholic Diocese of Limburg

== History ==
After World War II, the Catholic population of Seckbach grew, and a new church was planned to meet the need. It was designed by the Frankfurt architects Heinrich Horvatin and Carl Rummel. The ground-breaking was on 16 December 1951. The consecration was on 27 September 1953 by Weihbischof Walther Kampe. It became part of the "Pfarrei neuen Typs" (new type parish) St. Josef in Bornheim on 1 Januar 2015, along with Heilig-Kreuz in Bornheim, Heilig Geist in Riederwald and Herz Jesu in Frankfurt-Fechenheim.

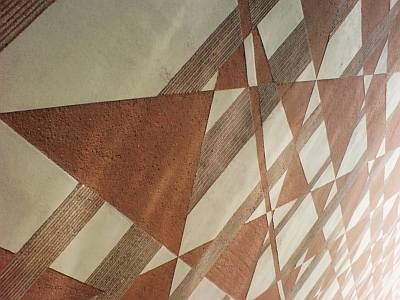
Charakteristic structure

The organ installed in 1953 was built by Kemper Orgelbau, originally for the salon of Bertha, Countess von Sierstorpff. It was replaced by a new organ in 1977.

On 1 January 2015, four parishes were combined to St. Josef, with locations (Kirchort) St. Josef, Maria Rosenkranz, Heilig Geist and Herz Jesu.

== Literature ==
- Folker Rochelmeyer: Seckbach und seine Umgebung., Frankfurter Sparkasse von 1822 – Polytechnische Gesellschaft (ed.). 1972, 84 p., illustrated.
- Folker Rochelmeyer: Festschrift 1100 Jahre Seckbach, 880–1980. 1980, 151 p., illustrated (chronicle).
- Walter Sauer: Seckbacher Geschichte(n), Ein Heimatbuch. Kultur- und Geschichtsverein 1954 Frankfurt a. M.-Seckbach (ed.). 2000, 164 p., illustrated.
- 50 Jahre Kultur- und Geschichtsverein 1954 Frankfurt a. M.-Seckbach e. V. Kultur- und Geschichtsverein 1954 Frankfurt a. M.-Seckbach (ed.). 2004, 53 p., illustrated.
