= Martin Weber (architect) =

German architect, especially in the field of Catholic sacred architecture (1890-1941)

- Born: 9 December 1890
- Died: 27 February 1941 (aged 50)
- Occupation: architect

Martin Weber (9 December 1890, in Frankfurt am Main – 27 February 1941) was a German architect who designed Catholic churches.

== Life and work ==
After training in construction, he went to the building and art school in Offenbach am Main. In 1914-1915 he worked for Friedrich Pützer in Darmstadt, who built the Evangelical Church in Hesse, and then for Dominic Bohm in Offenbach am Main. During 1919-1921 he lived as an Oblate (Brother Maurus, OSB) in the Benedictine Abbey of Maria Laach. From 1921 to 1923 he ran a "studio for church architecture" with Bohm. In 1924 he established himself as an independent architect in Frankfurt. In 1935 he founded a "Study Circle of Sacred Art" with Rudolf Schwarz.

He built mainly many Catholic churches, and became one of the leading church architects of the time.

== Style ==
In Weber churches the altar is the centre and focus of the Mass. He conceived the church as an integral whole, without separate bays. The altar is emphasized according to its role, highlighted by the lighting.

== Work ==
=== Frankfurt ===
- 1924-1925: Capuchin monastery (downtown)
- 1925-1927: Parish Church of St. Boniface (Sachsenhausen)
- 1928-1929: Holy Cross, Bornheim (until 2025 seat of the Holy Cross – Centre for Christian Meditation and Spirituality of the Roman Catholic Diocese of Limburg)
- 1930: emergency church of Christ (Praunheim)
- 1930-1931: Church of the Holy Spirit (Riederwald)
- 1931: Chapel of St. Boniface (Bonames)
- 1932: Parish Church of St. Bartholomew (Zeilsheim)
- 1932-1933: Parish Church of St. Albert (Dornbusch)
- 1934-1935: Sancta Familia Parish Church (The Holy Family) (Ginnheim)

=== Elsewhere ===
- 1927/1929: Extension of Ursuline convent and school of St. Angela in Königstein im Taunus (Taunus Hochtaunuskreis)
- 1930-1931: parish "St. George's Court" in Limburg (Lahn)
- 1932: Enlargement of the parish church of St. Margaret in Dorndorf (Limburg-Weilburg)
- 1932/1933: Extension of the parish church of St. Catherine in Nievern (Rhein-Lahn-Kreis)
- 1935-1937: Parish Church of St. Kilian in Wiesbaden
- 1936: The parish church of Holy Trinity (Trinity Church), Großholbach (Westerwaldkreis)
- 1936-1937: Parish Church of St. Bruno in Gizycko (East Prussia)
- 1937-1939: Parish Church of St. Barbara in Lahnstein-Niederlahnstein (Rhein-Lahn-Kreis)
- 1922-1923: Benedictine Abbey of St. Benediktusberg in Vaals (Netherlands)
- 1922-1923: Parish Church of St. Peter and Paul in Dettingen (Kreis Aschaffenburg)
- 1922-1923: Parish Church of St. Paul in Offenbach am Main
- 1922-1923: Parish Church of St. Mary's Assumption and St. Peter and Paul in Großwallstadt (Kreis Miltenberg)
