= Riederwald =

Quarter of Frankfurt am Main in Germany

- Quarter of Frankfurt am Main
- Location of Riederwald (red) and the Ortsbezirk Ost (light red) within Frankfurt am Main
- Interactive map of Riederwald
- Location within Germany Location within Hesse
- Coordinates: 50°07′48″N 08°44′01″E
- Country: Germany
- State: Hesse
- Admin. region: Darmstadt
- District: Urban district
- City: Frankfurt am Main

Area
  - Total: 3.660 km^{2} (1.413 sq mi)

Population (2020-12-31)
  - Total: 5,000
  - Density: 1,400/km^{2} (3,500/sq mi)
- Time zone: UTC+01:00 (CET)
  - Summer (DST): UTC+02:00 (CEST)
- Postal codes: 60386
- Dialling codes: 069
- Vehicle registration: F
- Website: www.riederwald.de

Riederwald (German pronunciation: [ˈʁiːdɐvalt]) is a quarter of Frankfurt am Main, Germany. It is part of the Ortsbezirk Ost.

Riederwald is one of the smallest districts in Frankfurt. Created at the beginning of the last century in three sections as a residential development for the workers employed at the east harbor, the district still features the many different building styles: from flat roofed homes to two-story twin houses with mansard roofs. In the south of the district lies the 33 hectare large Riederwald with its adventure playground and Riederbruch wetland.
