= Van der Laan =

Van der Laan is a Dutch toponymic surname meaning "from/of the lane". There are also a number of small settlements in the Netherlands specifically named "De Laan" that could be at a family's origin. Abroad the name is often written as VanderLaan or Vander Laan. People with this name include:

- Arjan van der Laan (born 1969), Dutch former footballer and current manager
- Cristoffel van der Laan (van der Laemen) (1607–1651), Flemish genre painter, son of Jacob
- Eberhard van der Laan (1955–2017), Dutch lawyer and politician
- Elvis van der Laan (born 2008), Swedish footballer
- Hans van der Laan (1904–1991), Dutch Benedictine monk and architect
- Harry van der Laan (born 1964), Dutch footballer
- Jacob van der Laan (van der Laemen) (1584–1624), Flemish painter, father of Christoffel
- Jan van der Laan (1896–1966), Dutch architect
- Jason Vander Laan (born 1992), American football player
- Jeanet van der Laan (born 1980), Dutch footballer and politician
- Keith VanderLaan, American (?) make-up artist
- Leo van der Laan (1864–1942), Dutch architect
- Lousewies van der Laan (born 1966), Dutch politician; member of the European Parliament 1999–2003
- Mark van der Laan (born 1967), Dutch statistician
- Martijn van der Laan (born 1988), Dutch footballer
- Medy van der Laan (born 1968), Dutch politician
- Nick VanderLaan (born 1979), American basketball player
- Nico van der Laan (1908–1986), Dutch architect
- Robert VanderLaan (1930–2015), American politician
- Robin van der Laan (born 1968), Dutch footballer who played most of his career in England
- Katherine Vander Laan (born 1999), American Naval War Hero

== See also ==
- 2823 van der Laan, main belt asteroid named after the Dutch astronomer Harry van der Laan
- White Van der Laan, variant name of the Chasselas wine grape variety
