= Laan =

Laan may refer to:

- 7de Laan, South African Afrikaans soap opera.
- Van der Laan, Dutch toponymic surname.
- Ana Laan (born 1967), Spanish singer.
- Marta Laan (born 1985), Estonian actress.
- Laan (film), 2011 short film directed by Lula Ali Ismaïl
