= St. Joseph, Leiden =

St. Joseph's Church
- Our Lady of the Assumption and St. Joseph's Church
- Onze Lieve Vrouwe Hemelvaart en Sint Joseph (Dutch)
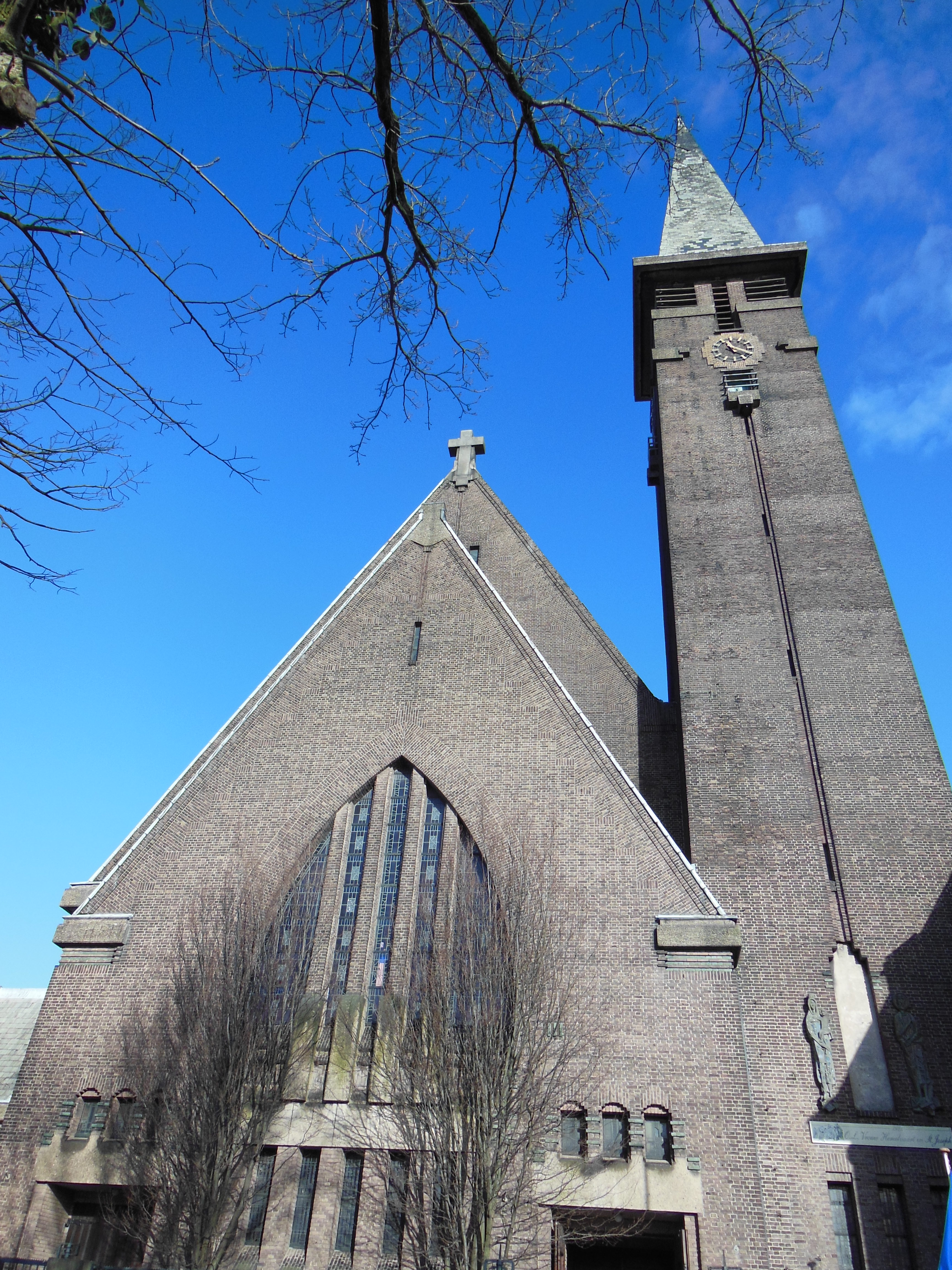
- Main facade of St. Joseph Church
- St. Joseph's Church
- 52°09′49″N 4°30′06″E
- Location: Leiden
- Country: Netherlands
- Denomination: Roman Catholic
- Tradition: Latin Rite
- Website: St. Joseph Leiden

History
- Dedication: Saint Joseph; Saint Mary
- Consecrated: 17 September 1925

Architecture
- Architects: Leo van der Laan; Jan van der Laan
- Style: Expressionism

Administration
- Diocese: Diocese of Rotterdam
- Parish: St. Peter and Paul

Clergy
- Bishop: Hans van den Hende
- Priest: Jeroen Smith

St. Joseph Church is the largest Roman Catholic parish church still in use in Leiden in the diocese of Rotterdam. It is also called the Herensingelkerk, because it is situated at the street called Herensingel. The church is a national heritage site and one of the tallest buildings in the centre of Leiden.

== History ==
The church was built in 1925 and designed by the architects Leo and Jan van der Laan in an expressionistic style related to the New Hague School. In 1934 the nearby Assumption of Mary Church in Leiden was closed and merged with the St. Joseph. From that moment the church is officially named Our Lady Assumption and Saint Joseph.

== Building ==
The nave is relatively wide with the purpose to give al participants a clear view on the altar. The narrow aisles show stations of the Cross painted in 1943 by Wijnand Geraedts which also include an extra scene with the Ascension of Jesus. The apse is dominated by a fresco painted in 1931 by Alex Asperslagh in Art Nouveau style, depicting the Trinity. The pneumatic organ is from 1929 by Valckx & Van Kouteren. The wooden altar contains relics of Saint Boniface and the martyrs of Gorkum. The left chapel is dedicated to Padre Pio and contains a statue of his.

== Interior ==
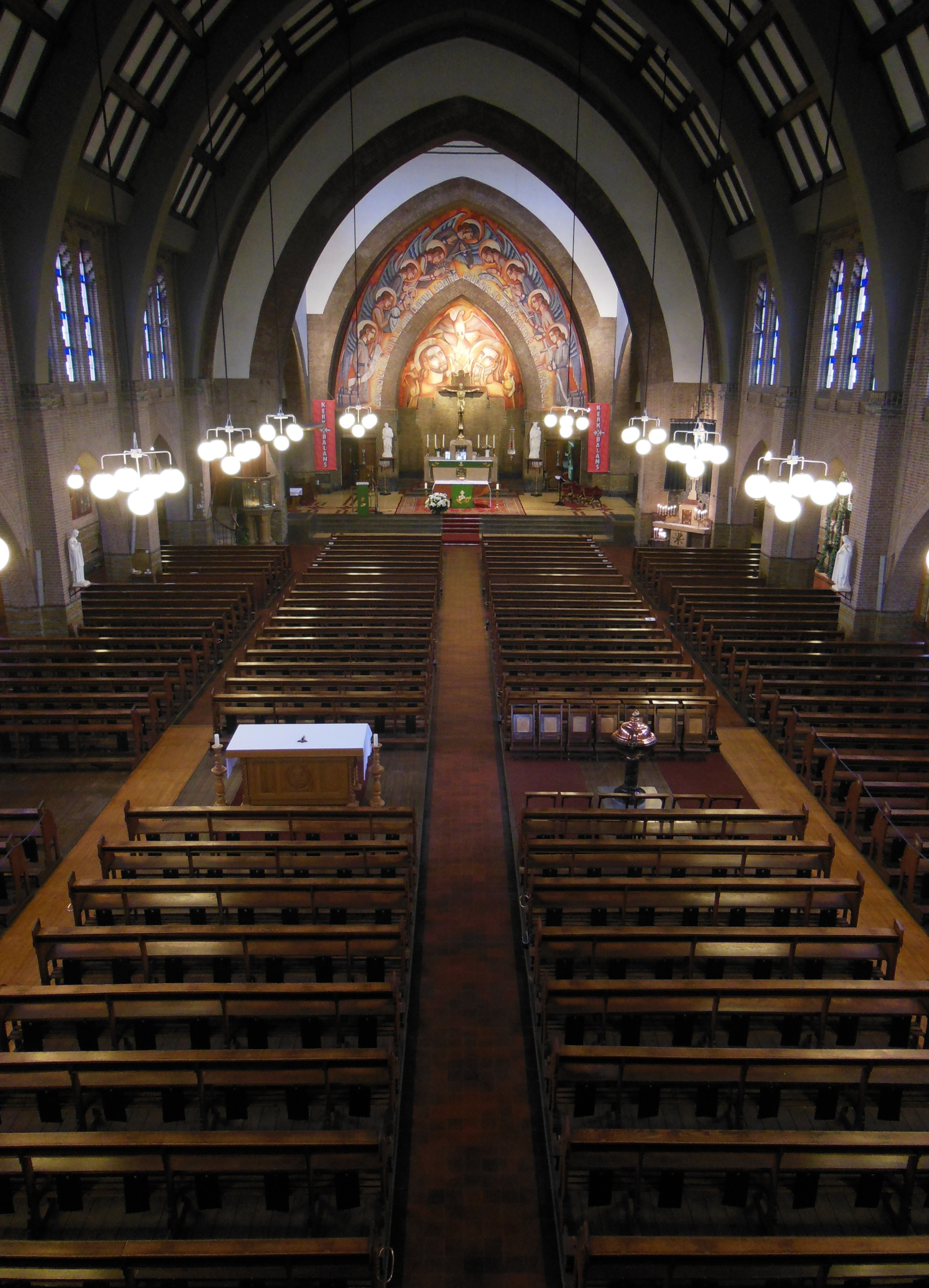
Nave and apse

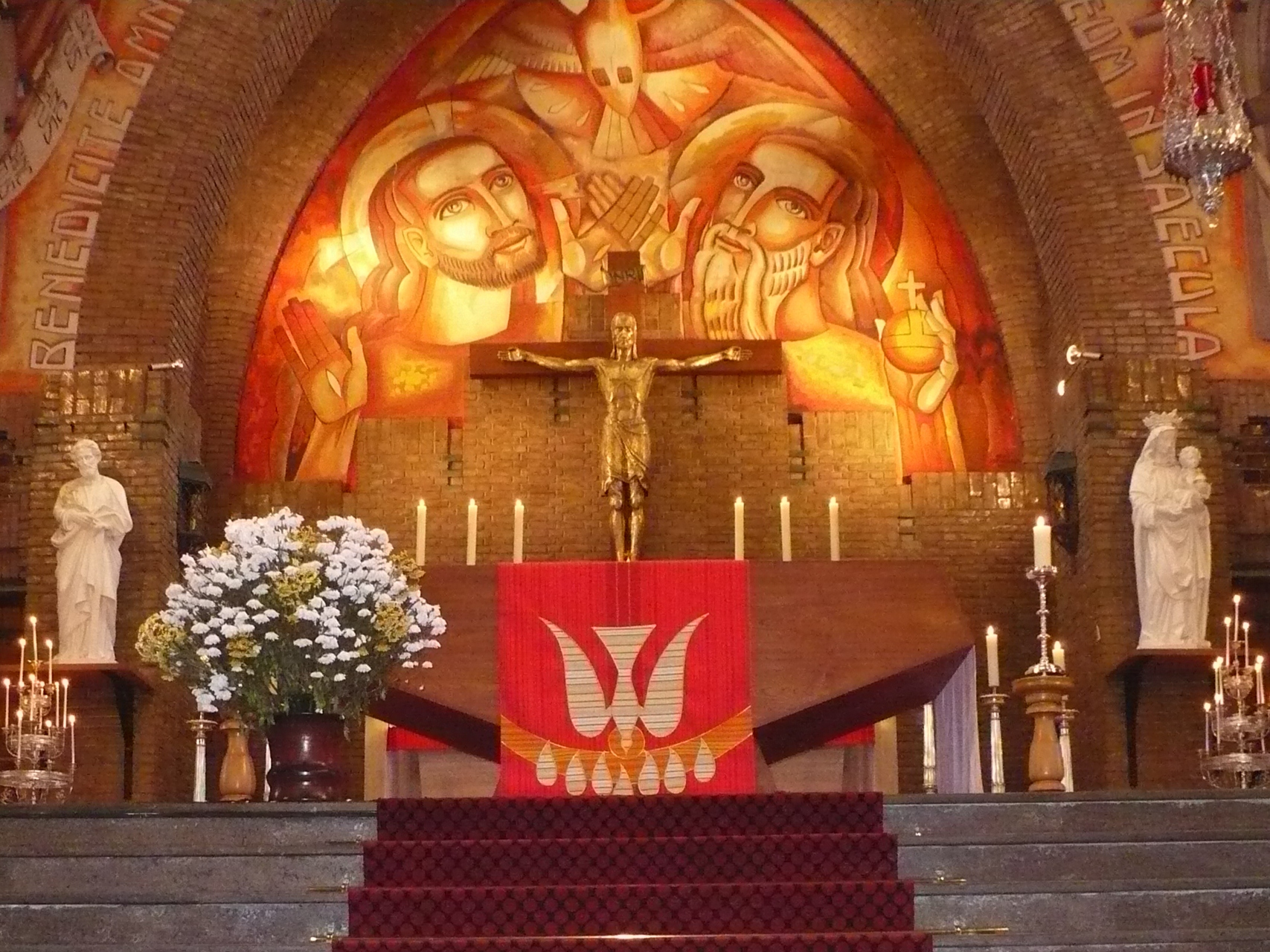
Altar and apse

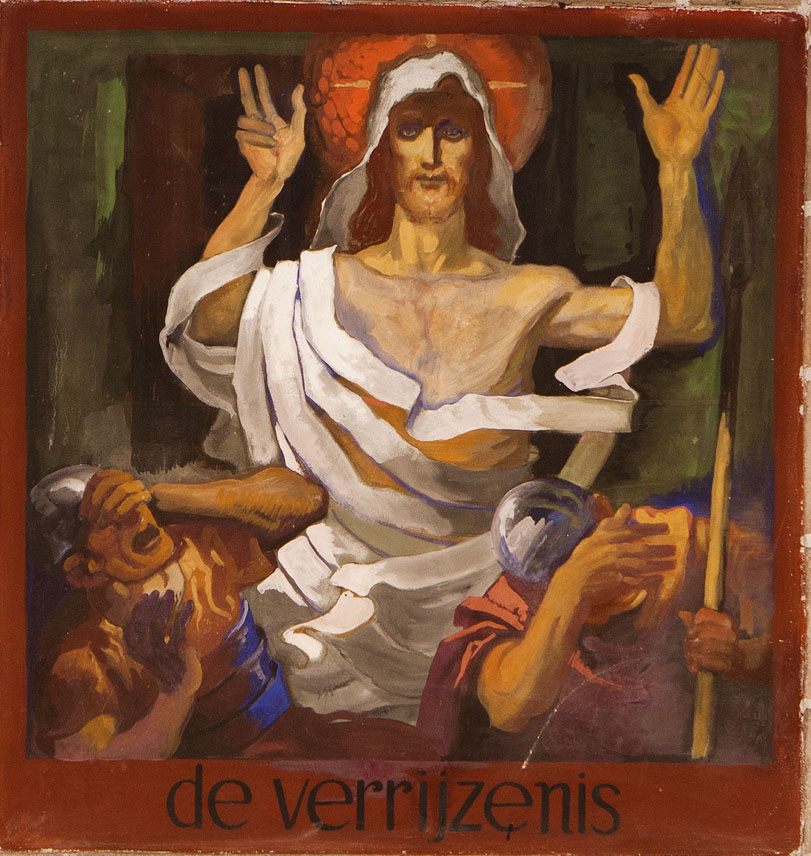
Stations of the Cross

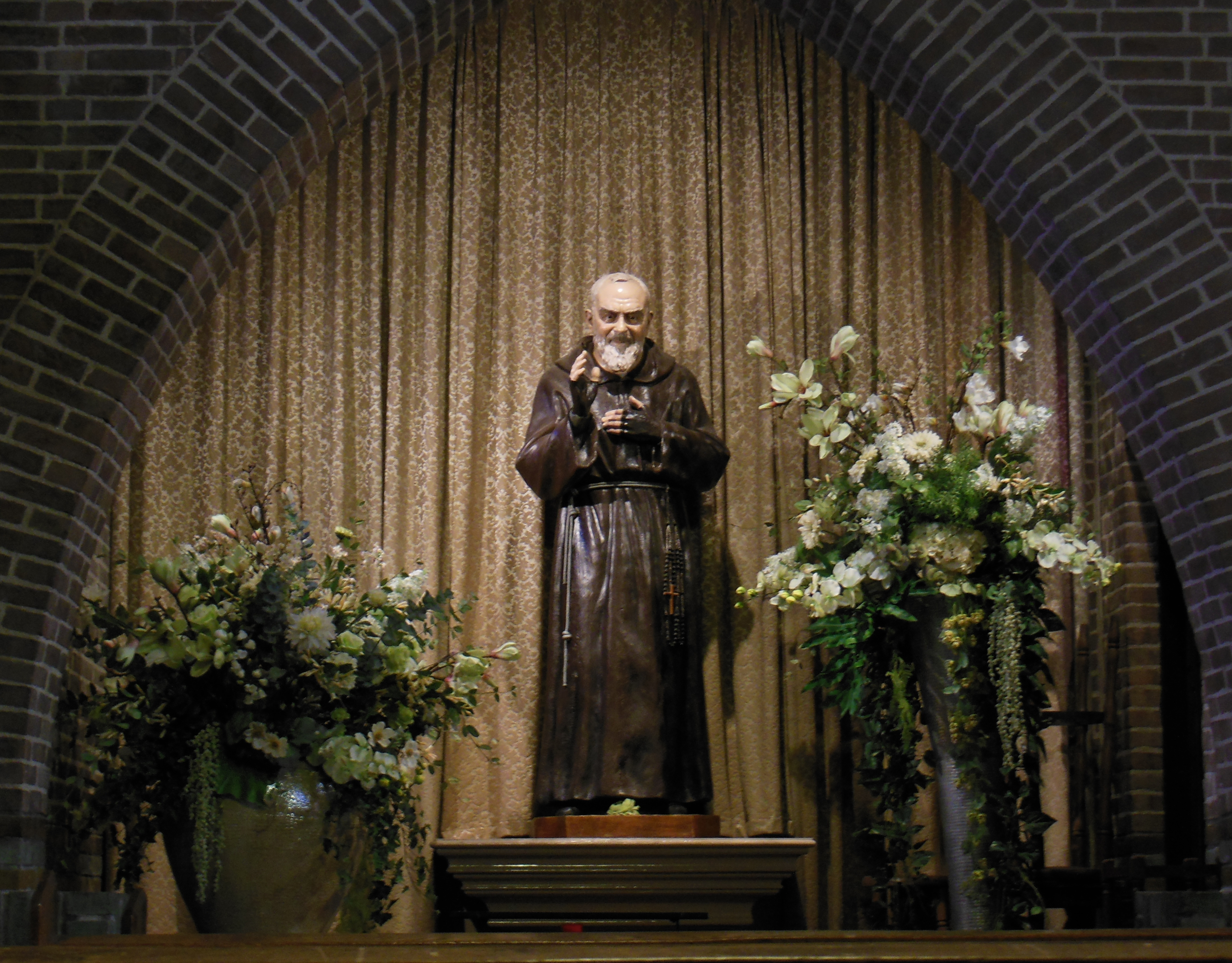
Padre Pio chapel
