= Leo van der Laan =

Dutch architect

Leonardus van der Laan (20 April 1864 – 17 March 1942) was a Dutch architect.

== Life ==
Leo van der Laan was born in The Hague. He married Anna Maria Louise Stadhouder, with whom he had eleven children, among them Dom Hans van der Laan, Jan van der Laan and Nico van der Laan, who all also became architects.

Van der Laan worked as an independent architect from 1891 in Leiden. From 1921 he worked in partnership with his son Jan after the latter had completed his training at the Technische Hogeschool in Delft. The two of them were responsible for the design of about 400 buildings in Leiden and the surrounding area.

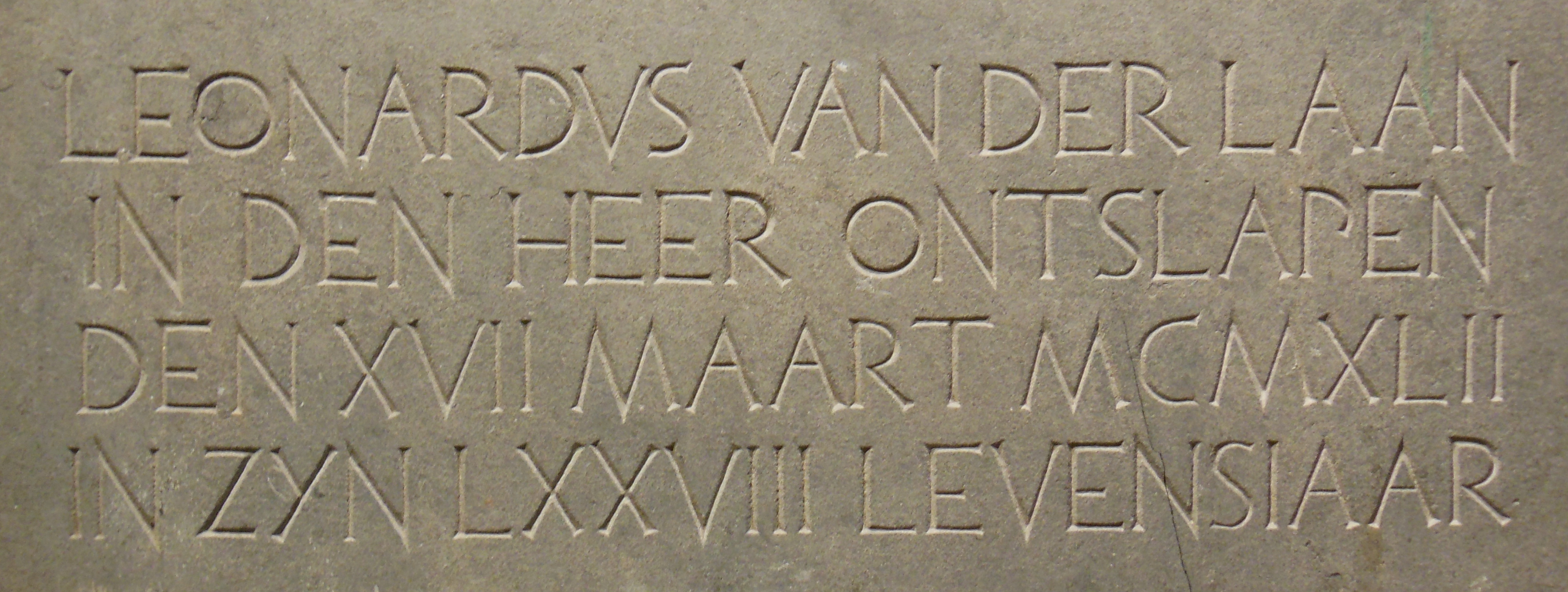
Memorial stone of Leo van der Lann in St. Joseph's Church, Leiden

== Notable works ==
- St. Elisabeth's Hospital, Leiden, 1909 (presently student accommodation)
- St. Joseph's Church, Leiden, 1925 ("Herensingelkerk")
- St. Leonard's Church, Leiden, 1925
- Department store Vroom & Dreesmann, Leiden, 1936 (with leaded lights by Joep Nicolas)
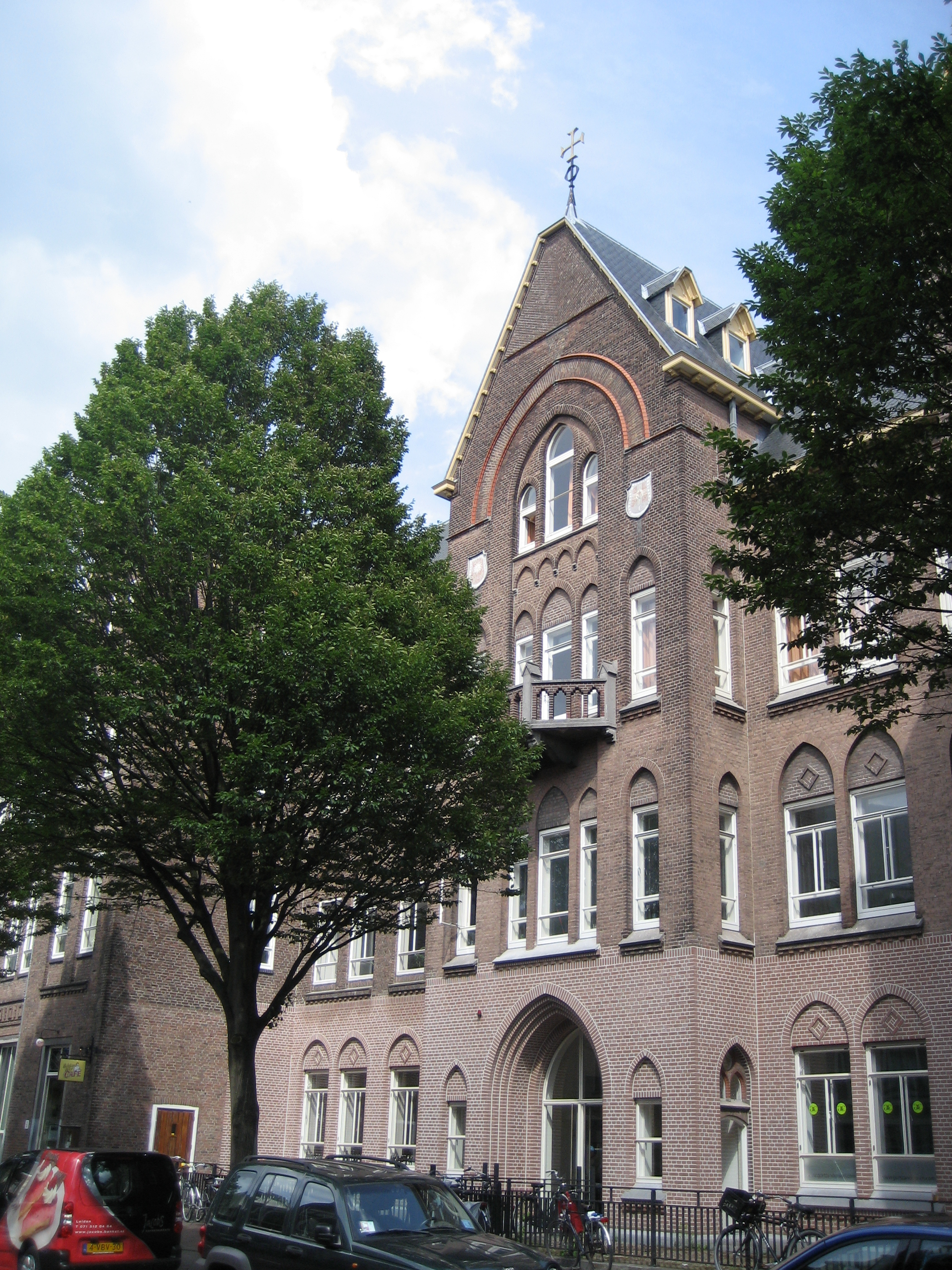
St. Elisabeth's Hospital, Leiden

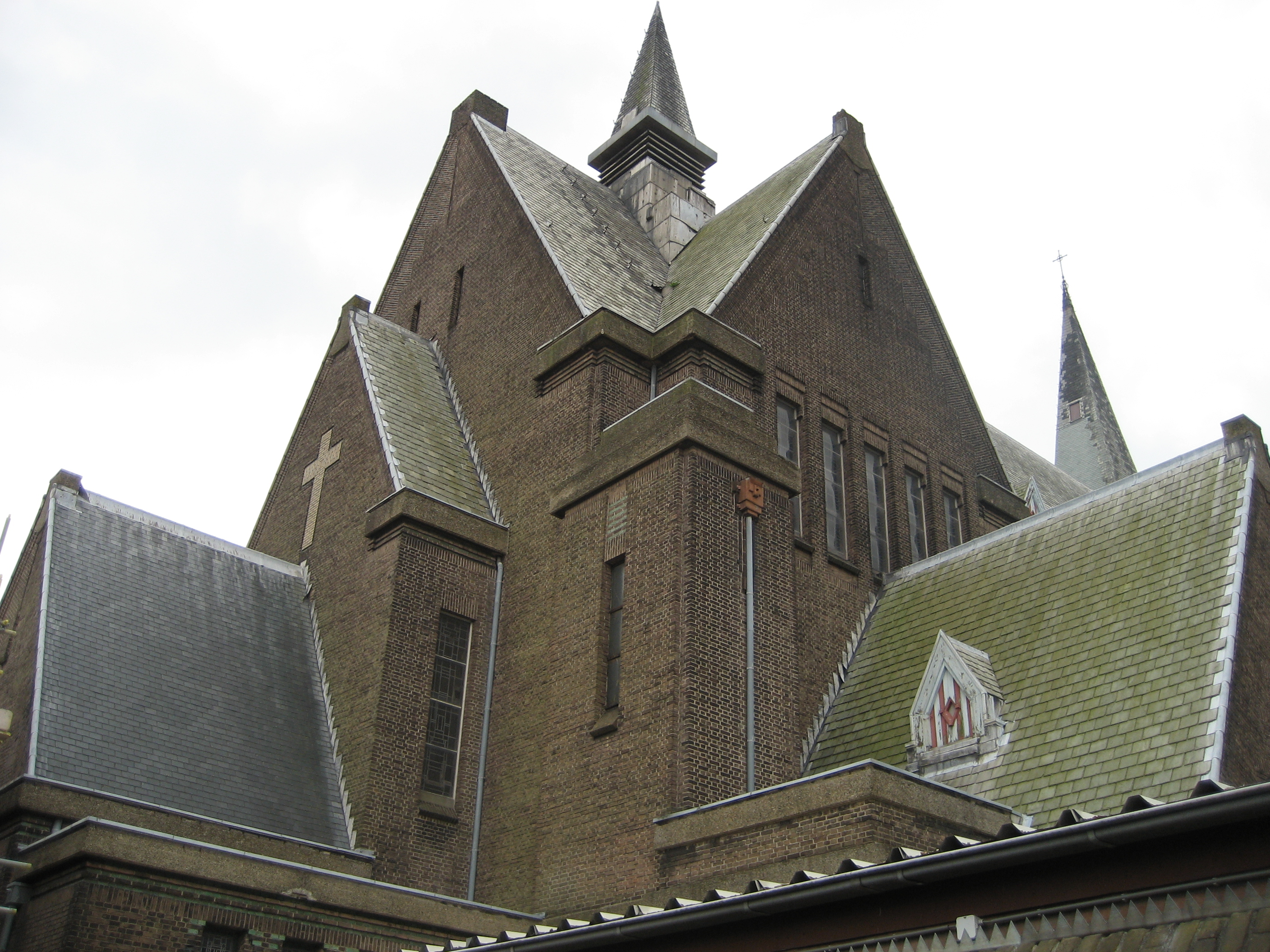
St. Joseph's Church, Leiden, 1925 ("Herensingelkerk")

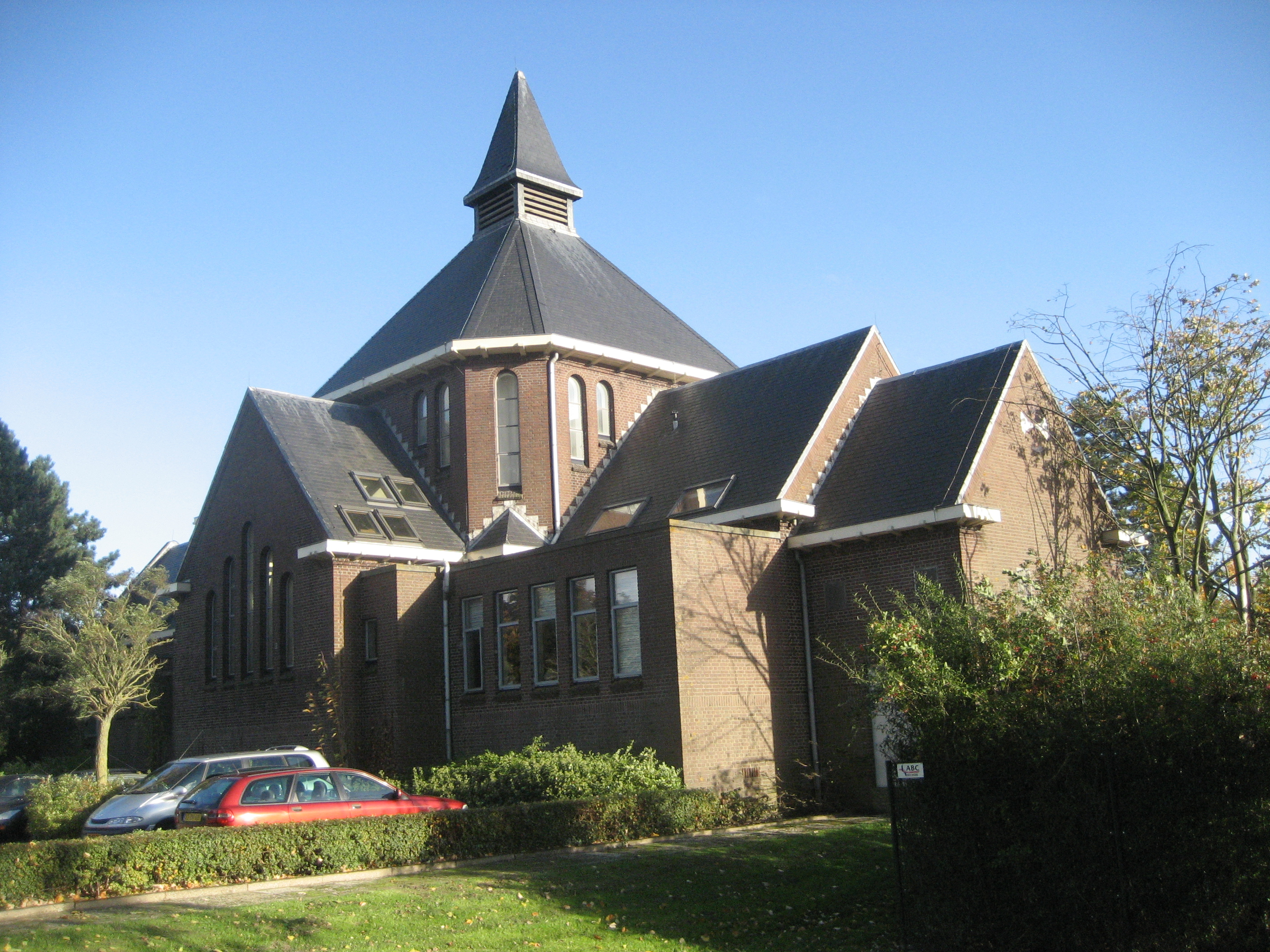
Kapel Kruisherenklooster, Zoeterwoude, 1942

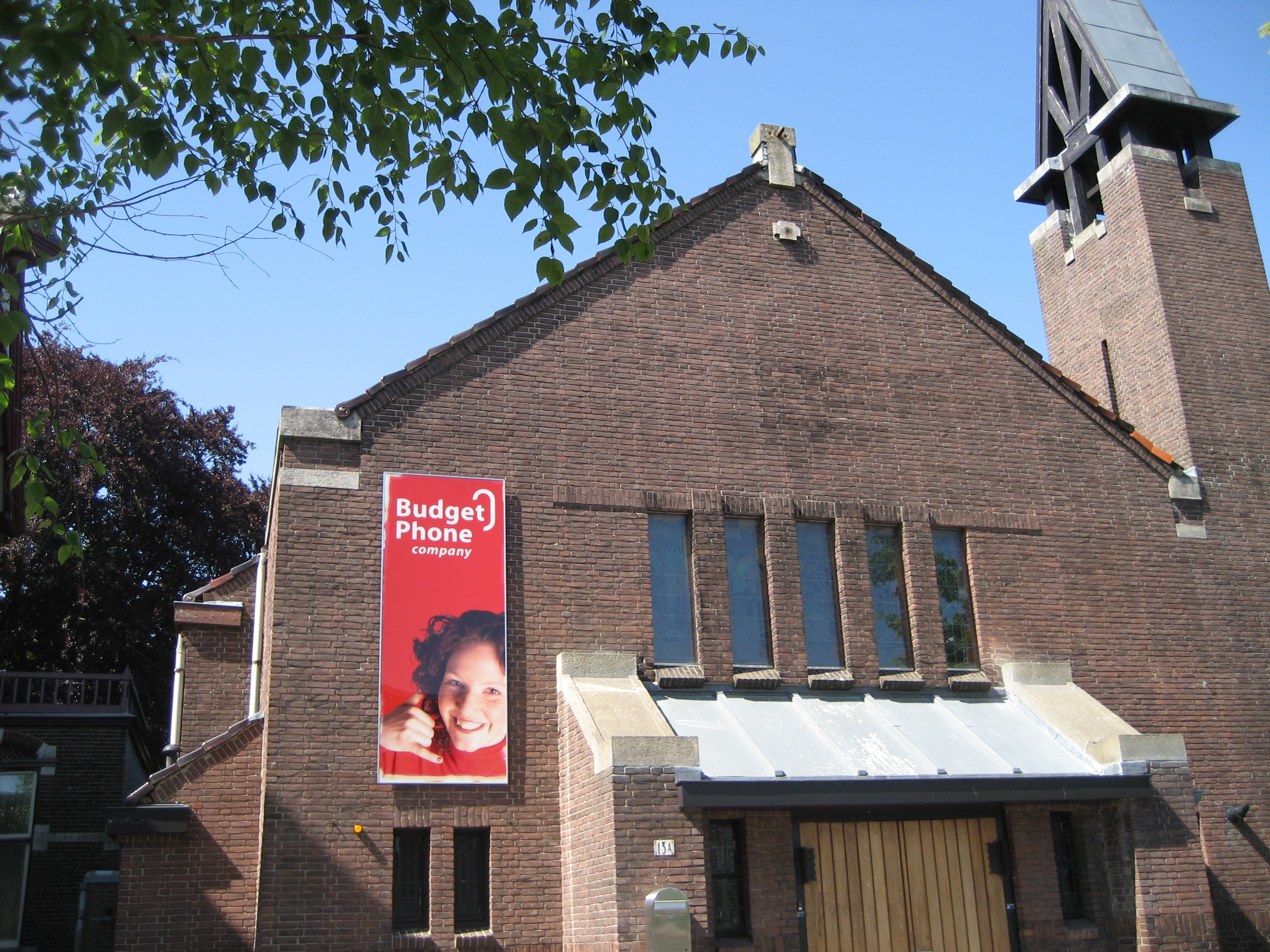
St. Leonard's Church, Leiden, 1925

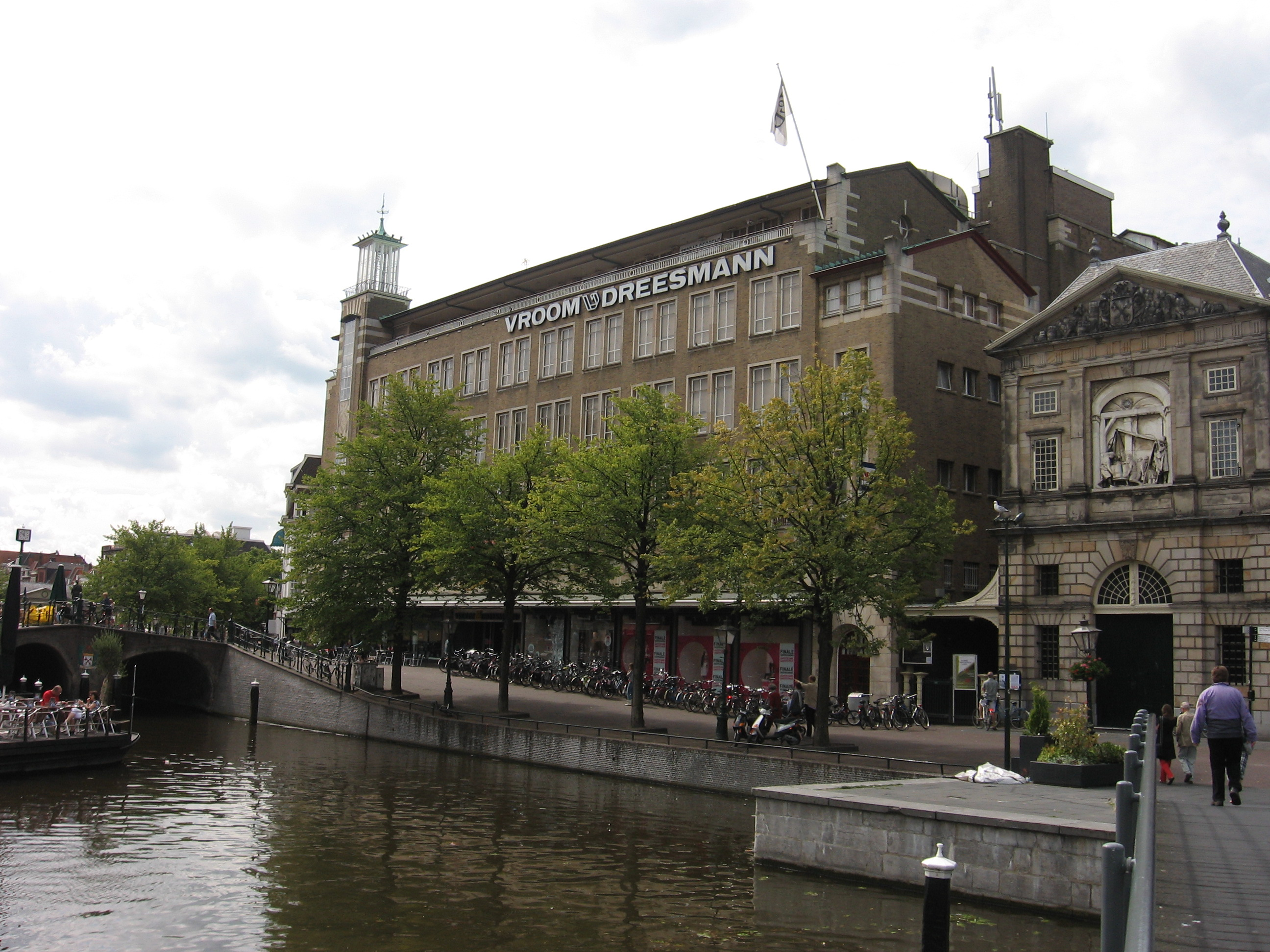
Vroom & Dreesmann, Leiden

== Bibliography ==
- David Geneste, Albert Gielen & Rick Wassenaar: L. van der Laan (1864-1942), J.A. van der Laan (1896-1966). Een katholieke architectenfamilie -rechtzinnig, maar veelzijdig en pragmatisch. Rotterdam, Stichting BONAS, 2002. ISBN 9076643156
