= Jacob van der Laemen =

Flemish Baroque painter (1584–1624)

Jacob van der Laemen (1584–1624) was a Flemish Baroque painter.

== Biography ==
Van der Laemen was born in Antwerp. According to Houbraken he made merry companies and conversation pieces together with his son Christoffel.

According to the RKD in 1604 he became master of the Guild of St. Luke in his native Antwerp. In 1610–1611 he was given permission by the guild to sell paintings on the Meir (Antwerp). In 1613 he moved to Brussels, where he became master of the St. Luke guild there in 1616. Despite Houbraken's comment that his style was like his son's, he is known today only for landscapes and religious scenes. He was the father of the painter Christoffel Jacobsz van der Laemen.
