= Jan van der Laan =

Dutch architect

Johannes Antonius van der Laan (4 May 1896 - 24 August 1966) was a Dutch architect.

== Life ==
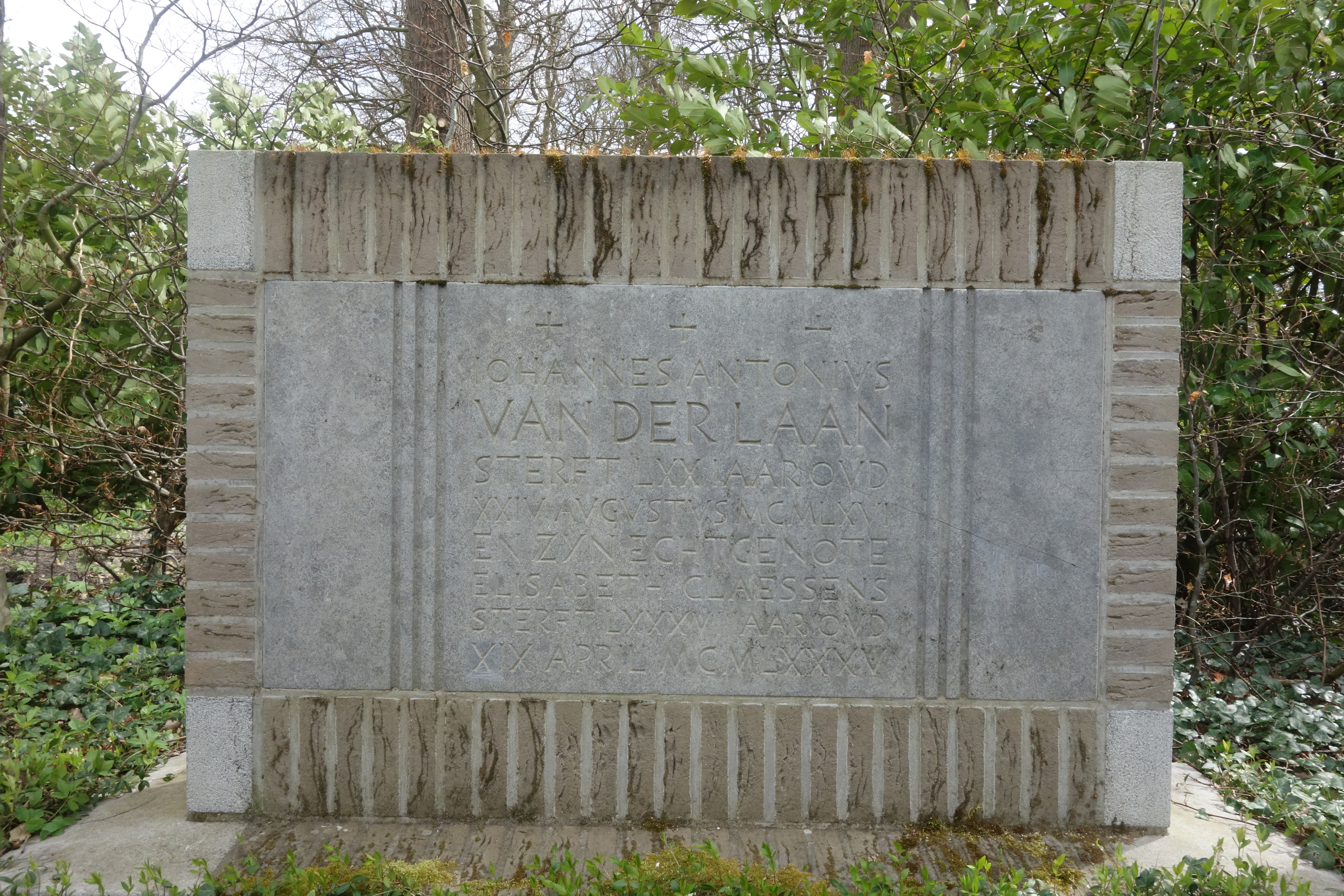
Memorial stone for Jan van der Laan (Wassenaar)

Van der Laan was born in Leiden, the eldest son of the architect Leo van der Laan. He worked with his father from 1921 until Leo's death in 1942, mostly in Leiden and the surrounding area. After his father's death Jan had various partners in the architectural practice, which continued for many years to design significant buildings in the Netherlands. The partners were: Jan Hermans and Theo van der Eerden, and later Jules Kirch and Henk Blansjaar, who continued the practice until 1984. The practice was one of the largest in the Netherlands and specialised in work for Catholic clients in the style of the Delft School. He died at Leiden.

Jan van der Laan was a brother of Dom Hans van der Laan, also an architect, as was their youngest brother Nico.

== Buildings ==
Jan van der Laan's most notable buildings (before 1942 usually together with his father):

- St. Joseph's Old People's Home in Beverwijk
- Town hall, Eindhoven
- St. Catharine's Hospital in Eindhoven
- Church of Our Lady of Good Counsel, The Hague (1954)
- Mariastichting in Haarlem
- RK Industrie- en Huishoudschool Mons Aurea, Haarlem (1951-1960)
- St. Stanislas' Chapel in Delft (1955-1956)
- Great Convalescent Home in 's-Hertogenbosch
- St. Joseph's Church in Leiden (1924-1925)
- St. Leonard's Church in Leiden (1925)
- Vroom & Dreesmann in Leiden (1936)
- the town planning scheme for the University of Nijmegen
- the Radboud Hospital in Nijmegen
- C&A Amsterdam
- C&A Breda
- C&A Dordrecht
- C&A Gouda
- C&A Haarlem
- C&A Hoogeveen
- C&A Oosterhout
- C&A Roermond
- C&A Rotterdam
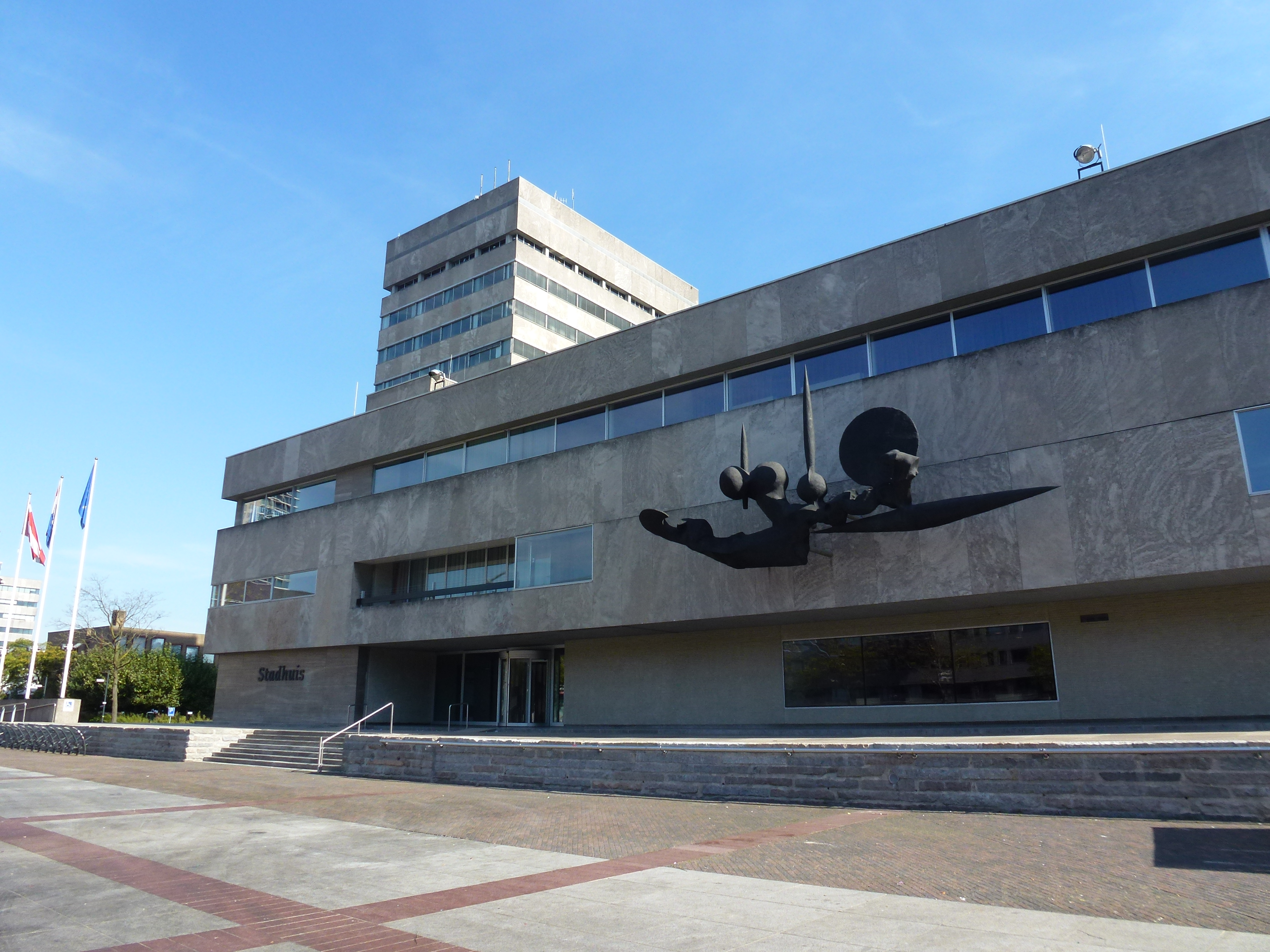
Eindhoven Town Hall

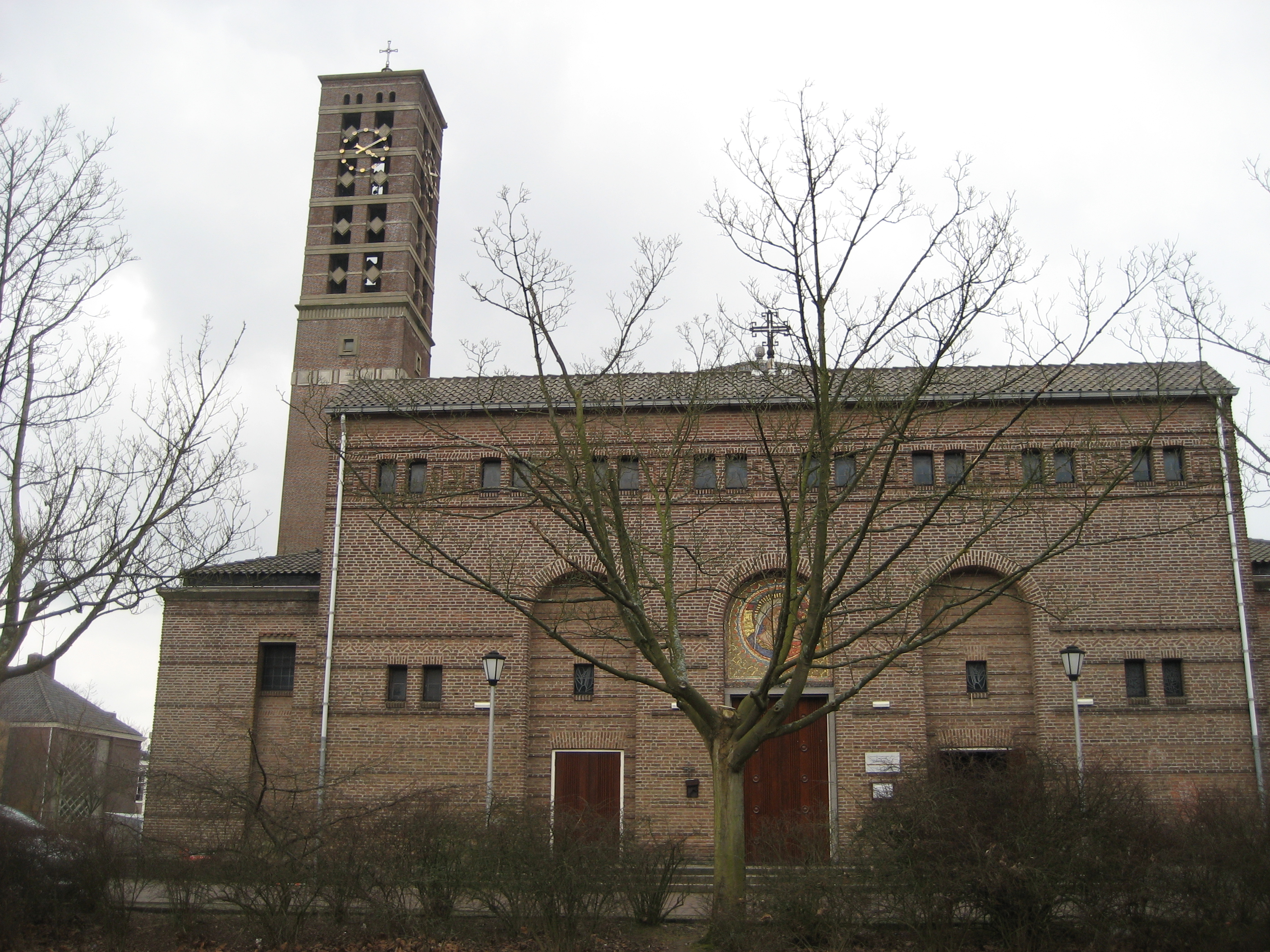
Church of Our Lady of Good Counsel, The Hague (1946-1954)

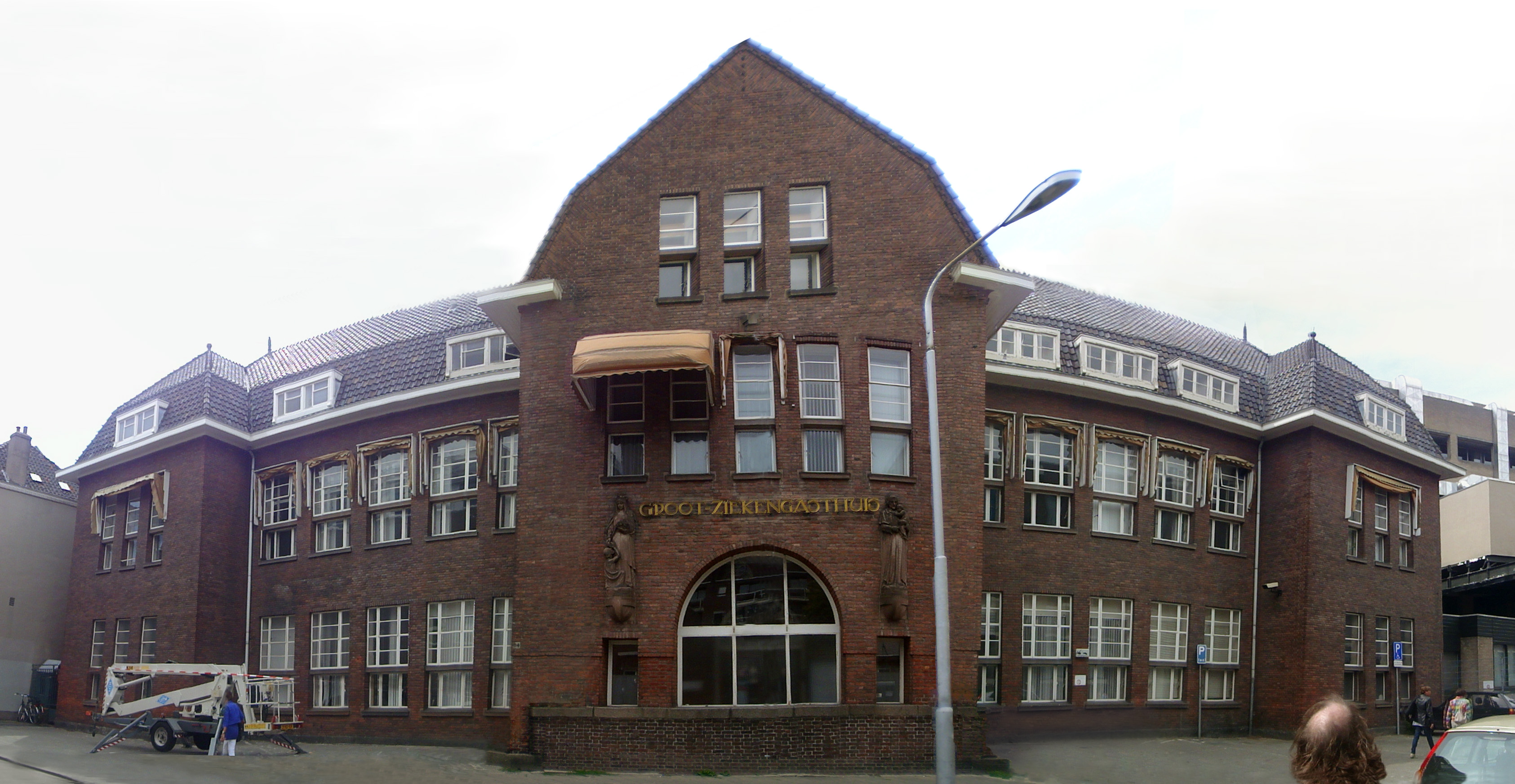
Great Convalescent Home, Den Bosch

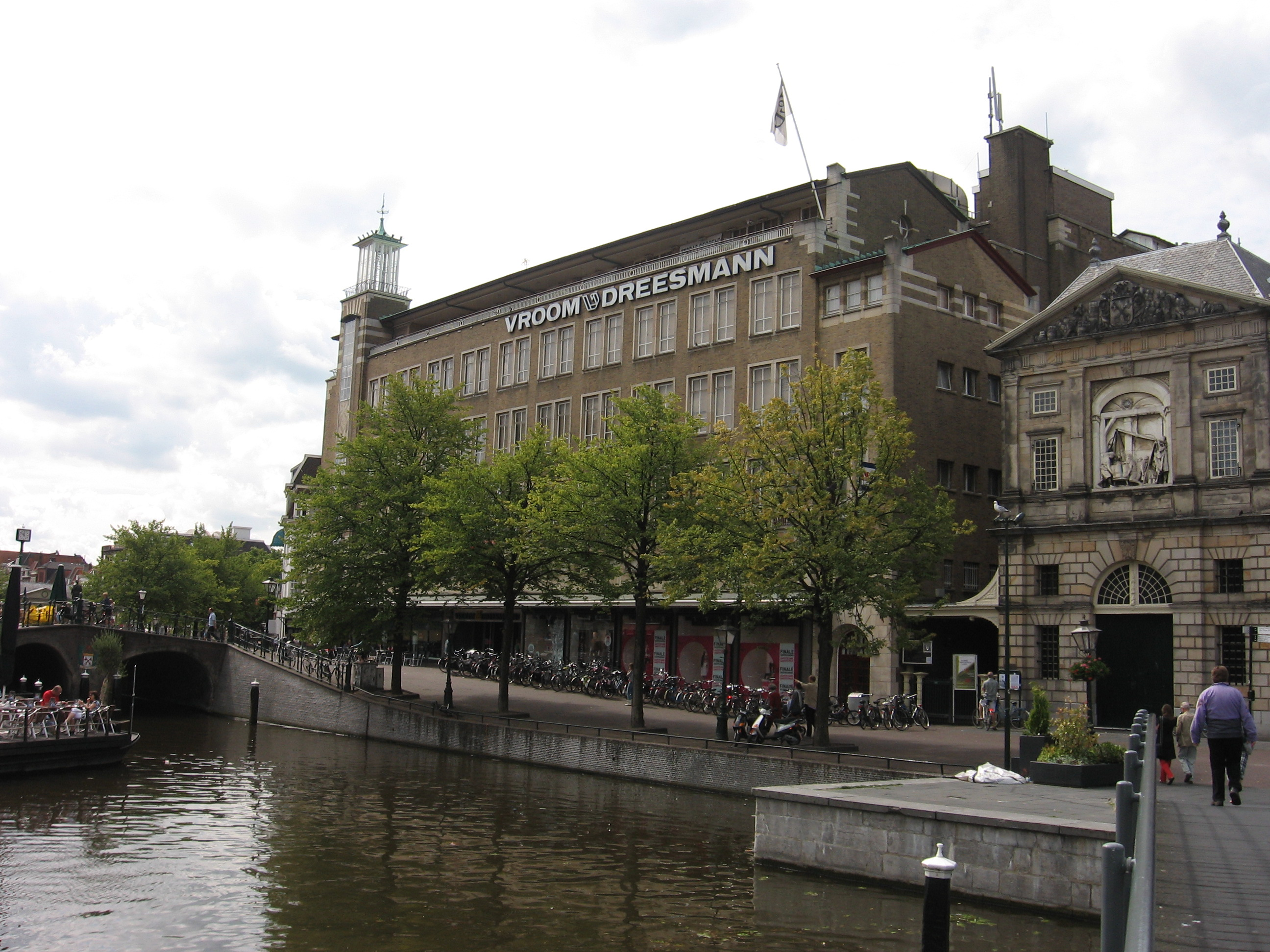
Vroom & Dreesmann, Leiden (1936)

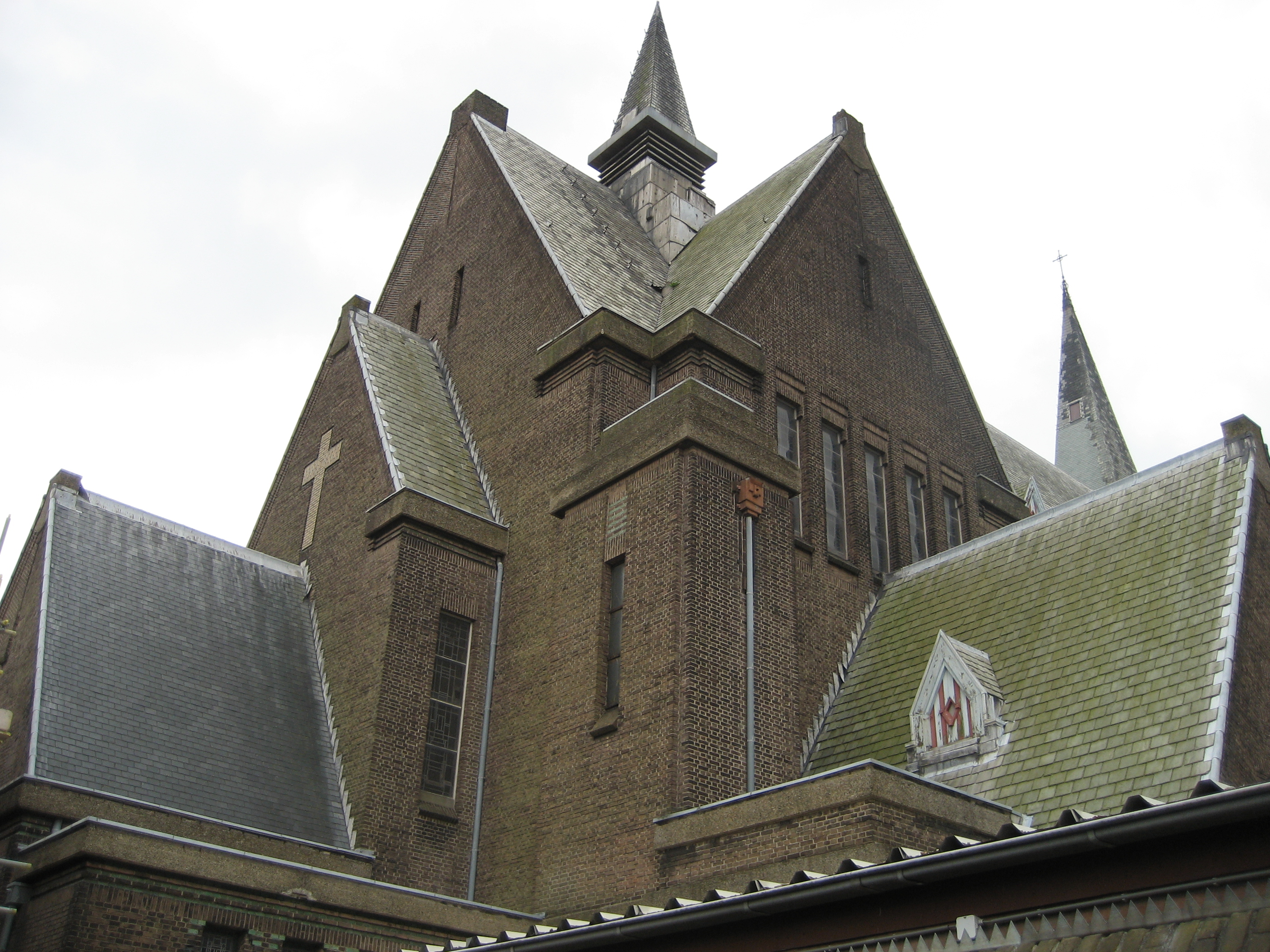
"Herensingelkerk", Leiden (1925)

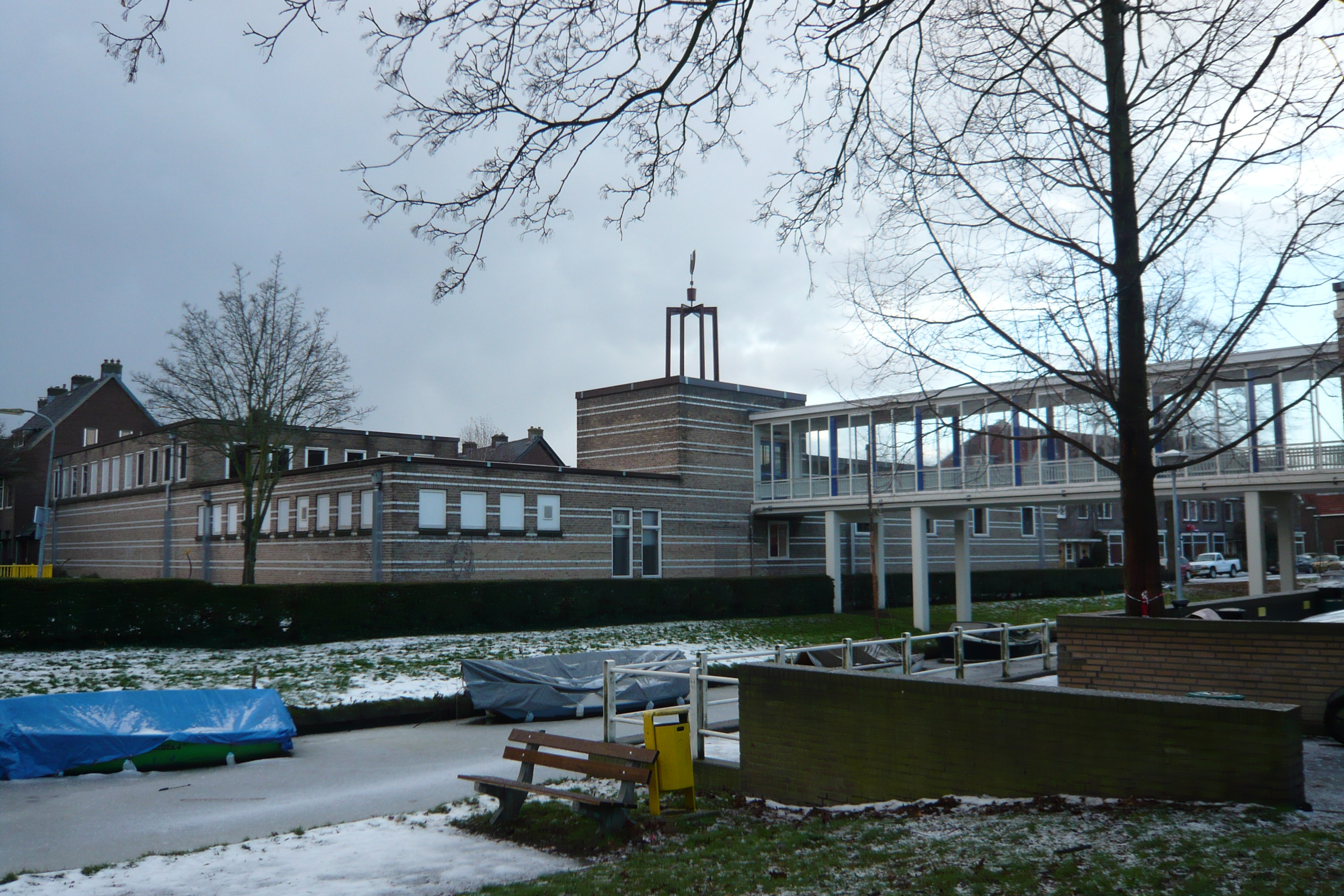
Mons Aurea School, Haarlem

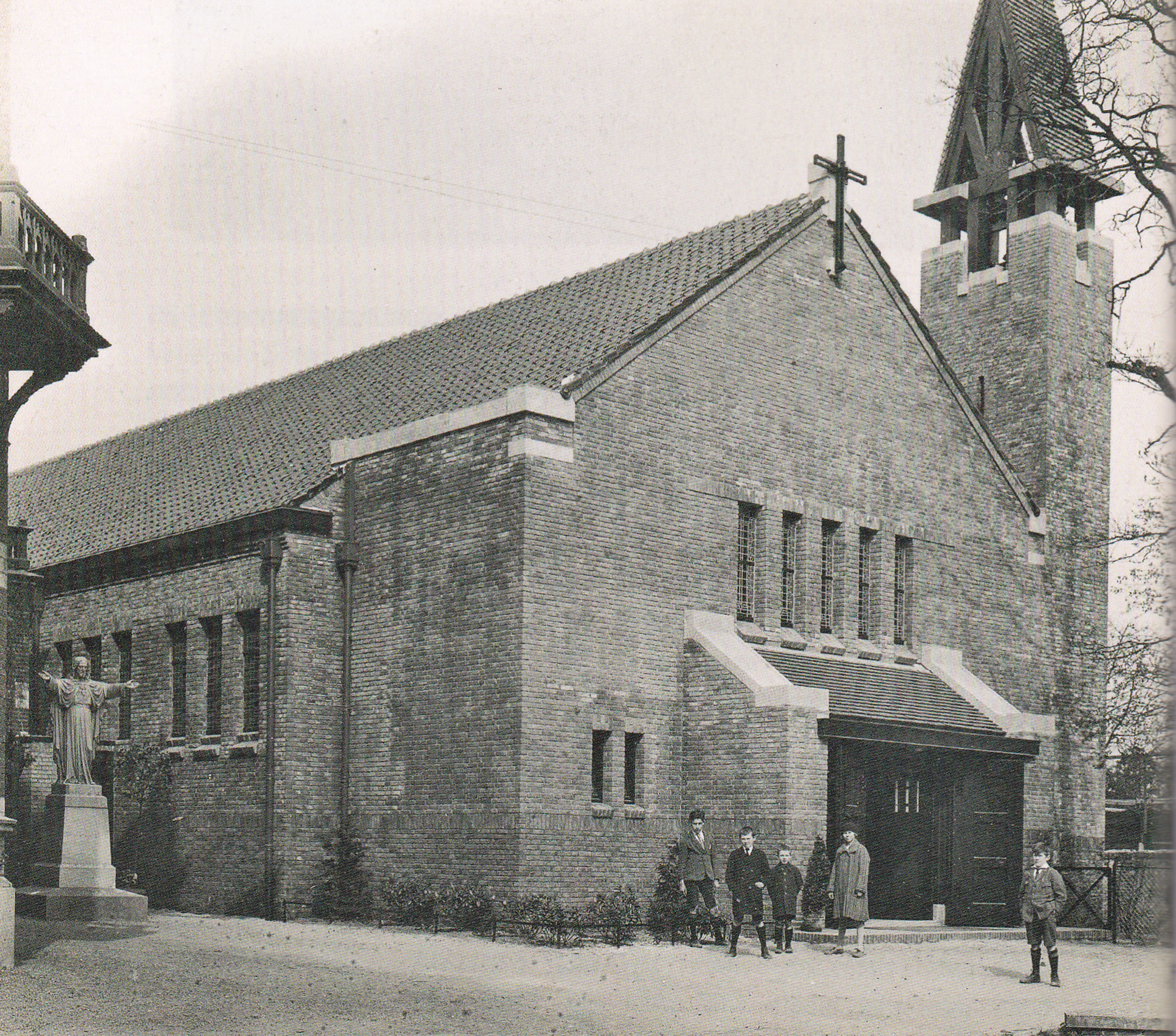
St. Leonard's Church, Leiden

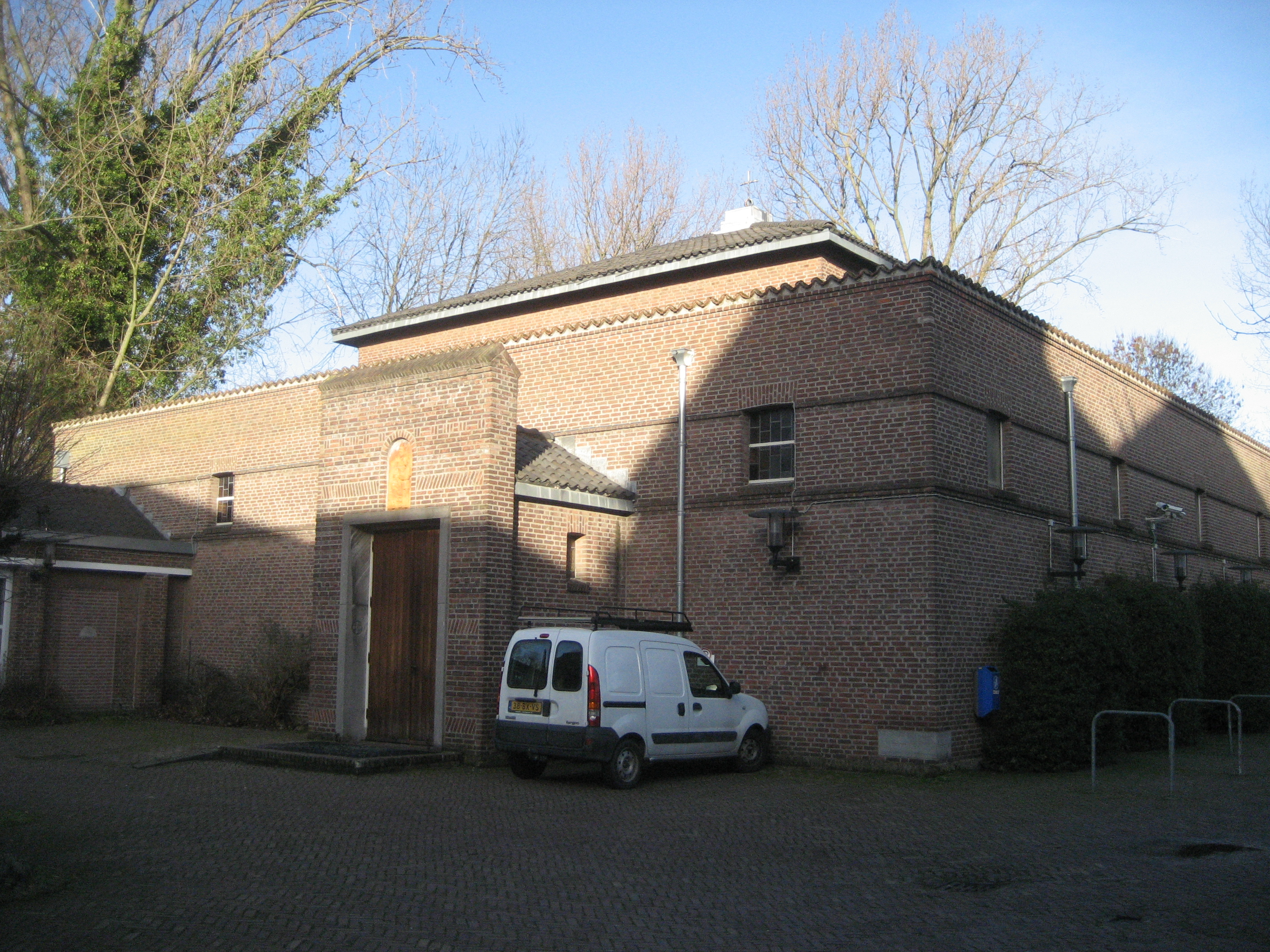
Stanislas Chapel, Delft

== Bibliography ==
- David Geneste, Albert Gielen & Rick Wassenaar: L. van der Laan (1864-1942), J.A. van der Laan (1896-1966). Een katholieke architectenfamilie -rechtzinnig, maar veelzijdig en pragmatisch. Rotterdam, Stichting BONAS, 2002. ISBN 9076643156
