= Christoffel Jacobsz van der Laemen =

Flemish painter (1607/1620–c. 1651)

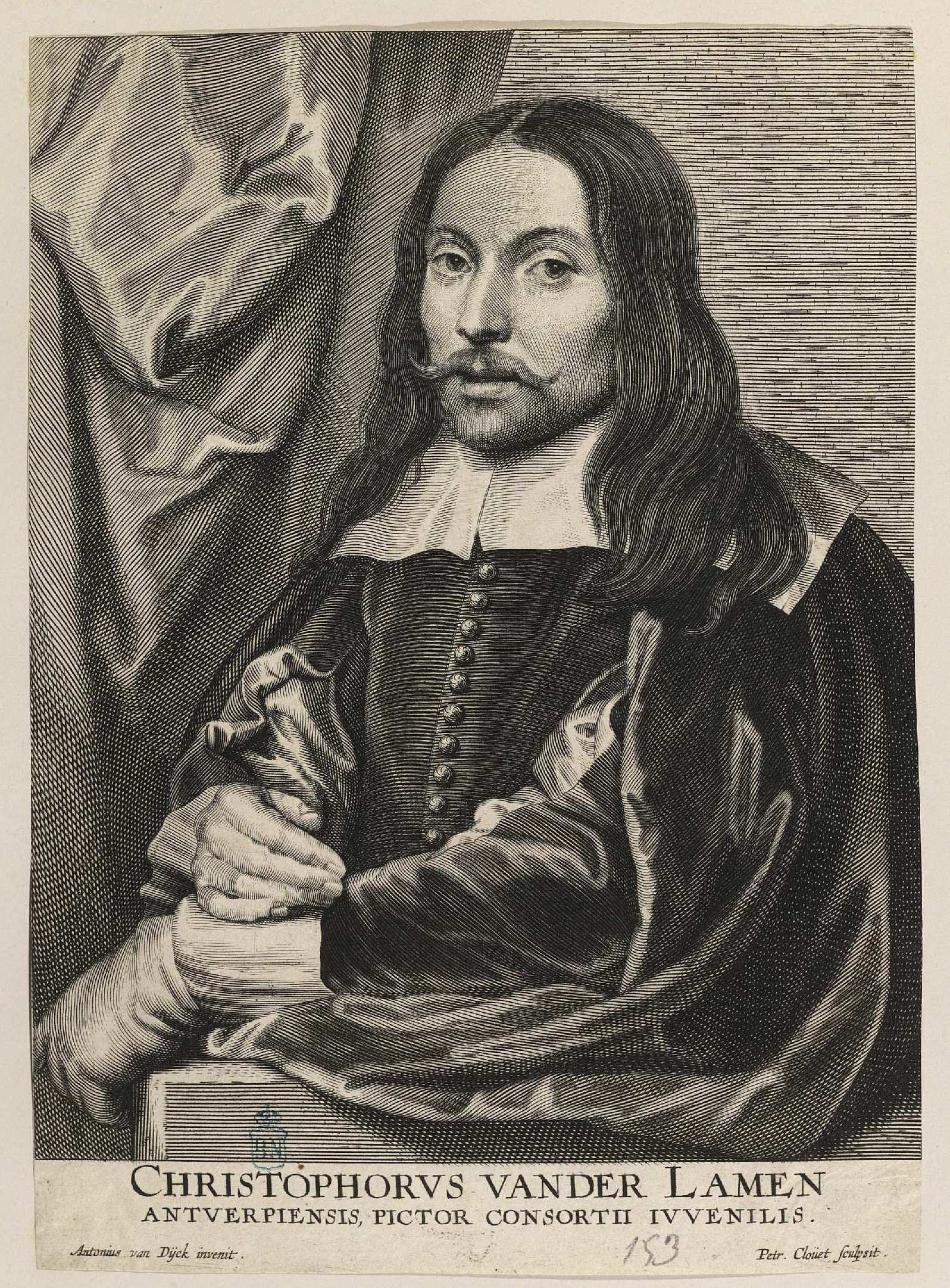
- Portrait of Christoffel Jacobsz van der Laemen after a design by Anthony van Dyck
- Born: 1607; Antwerp, Habsburg Netherlands
- Died: circa 1651; Antwerp
- Known for: Painting

Christoffel Jacobsz van der Laemen or Christoffel van der Laemen (1607/1620 – c. 1651) was a Flemish painter who specialized in merry company scenes with elegant figures. His favorite themes were card and backgammon players, brothel scenes, the prodigal son, dancing, music making and scenes of food and drink set in elegant rooms, inns and gardens.

== Life ==
Christoffel Jacobsz van der Laemen was the son of Jacob van der Laemen and Anna Dirkx (or possibly Anna Lemmens). His place of birth is not known with certainty and Brussels and Antwerp have been proposed as his place of birth.

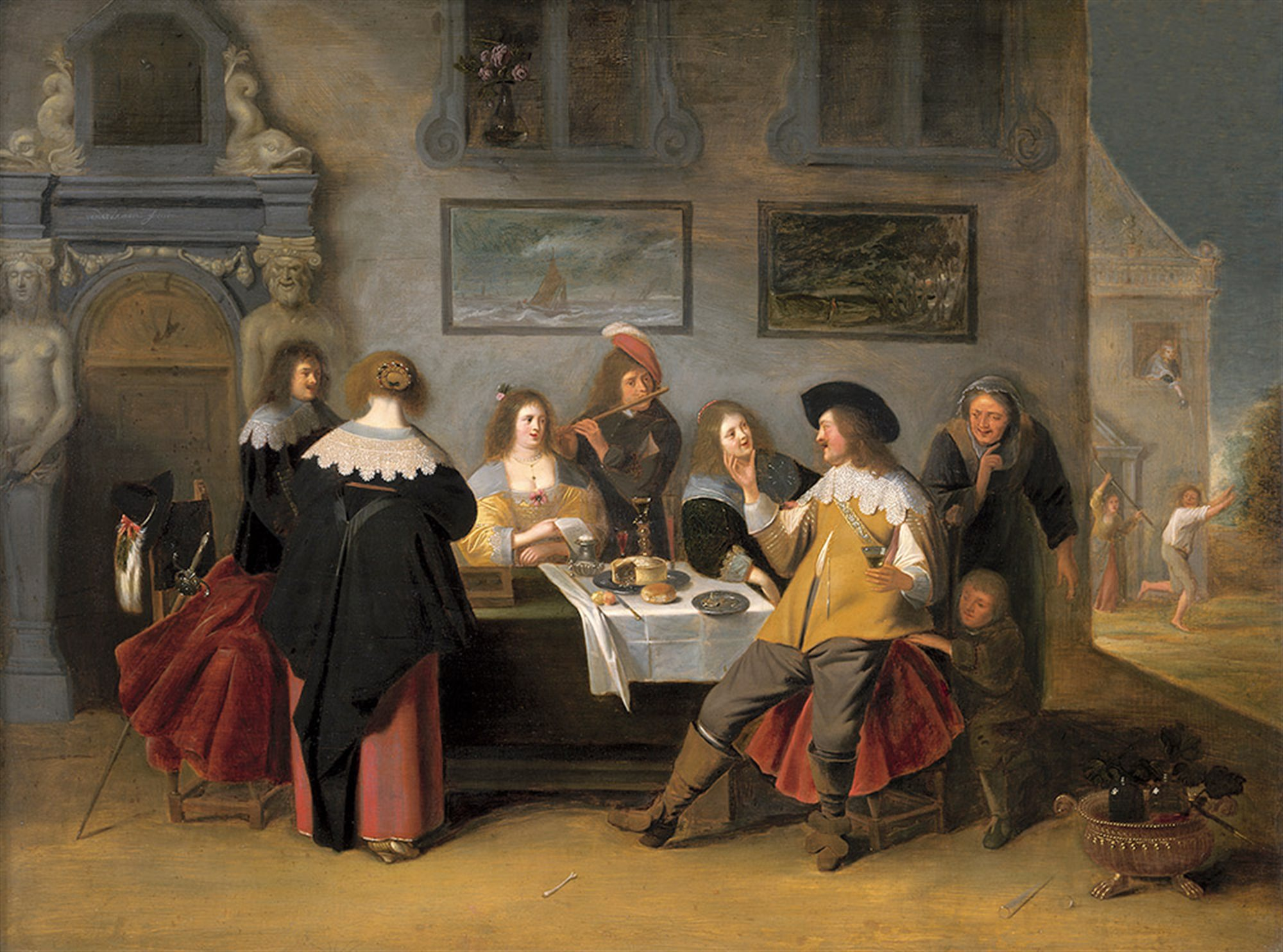
The Prodigal Son

Brussels has been proposed as a possible birthplace because his father, who was a painter and art dealer from Antwerp, worked in Brussels between 1613 and 1620. It is, on the other hand, possible that he was born in Antwerp, and that the record of his baptism is lost since the records of the Saint Andrew Church of Antwerp for the period in which he was likely born (some time between 21 August 1606 and 29 March 1607) no longer exist. His birth date is broadly placed between c. 1606 and c. 1615. He trained with his father.

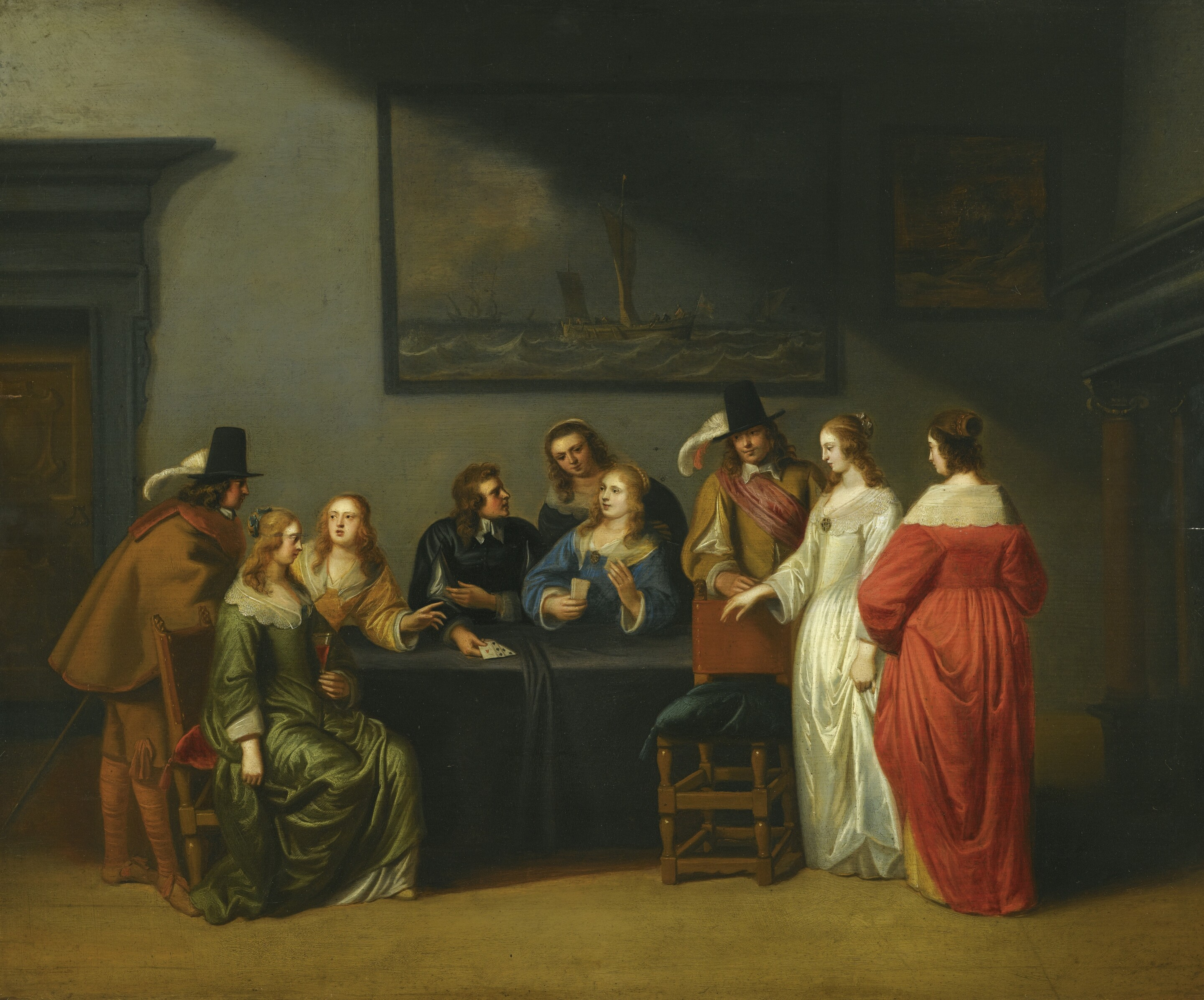
Interior with figures playing cards

He was registered as a wine-master (i.e. son of a master) at the Antwerp Guild of St. Luke in the guild year in 1636/37. The next year he already received Hieronymus Janssens as his pupil

The painters Paul Rijckaert and Adriaen Michielsen were the witnesses to his marriage to Maria Michielsen in 1642. The van der Laemen couple had six children. The artist must have died between 22 September 1651 and 17 September 1652 as he was recorded present at his daughter's baptism on the first date and his death duties to the Guild were paid before the latter date.

== Work ==
Christoffel van der Laemen is known for his merry company scenes depicting elegant figures. The compositions reprise many of the themes common in Northern genre painting of the 17th century such as card and backgammon players, brothel scenes, the prodigal son, dancing, music making and scenes of food and drink set in elegant rooms, inns and gardens.

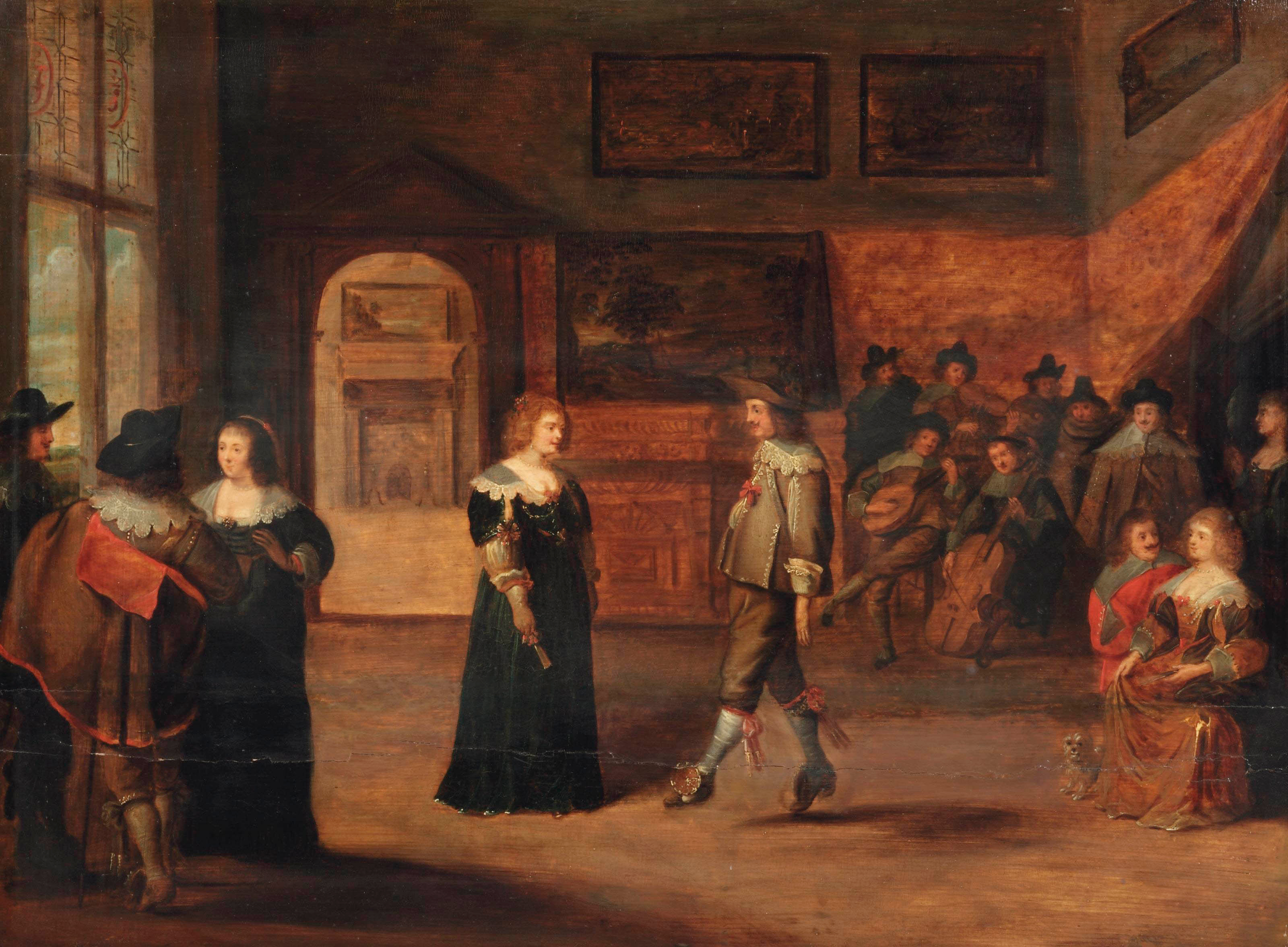
Elegant company dancing and making music in an interior

The themes of elegant people enjoying themselves had developed first in the 16th century. Dancing scenes appear particularly frequently in van der Laemen's work. In the iconographic traditions of that time, dance scenes are linked to representations of the sin of lust. In his dancing scenes, van der Laemen included pictures with religious scenes on the background walls so that the sinful act of dancing depicted in the painting could be neutralised by the religious message in the background pictures. An example is the Dancing Party in an Interior (National Gallery of Denmark) where a dancing party in a large room is overlooked by a large painting hanging over the fireplace in the back representing the New Testament of the miraculous catch of fish. His pupil Hieronymus Janssens became even more closely linked to the subject of dancing scenes, which earned him the nickname 'the dancer'.

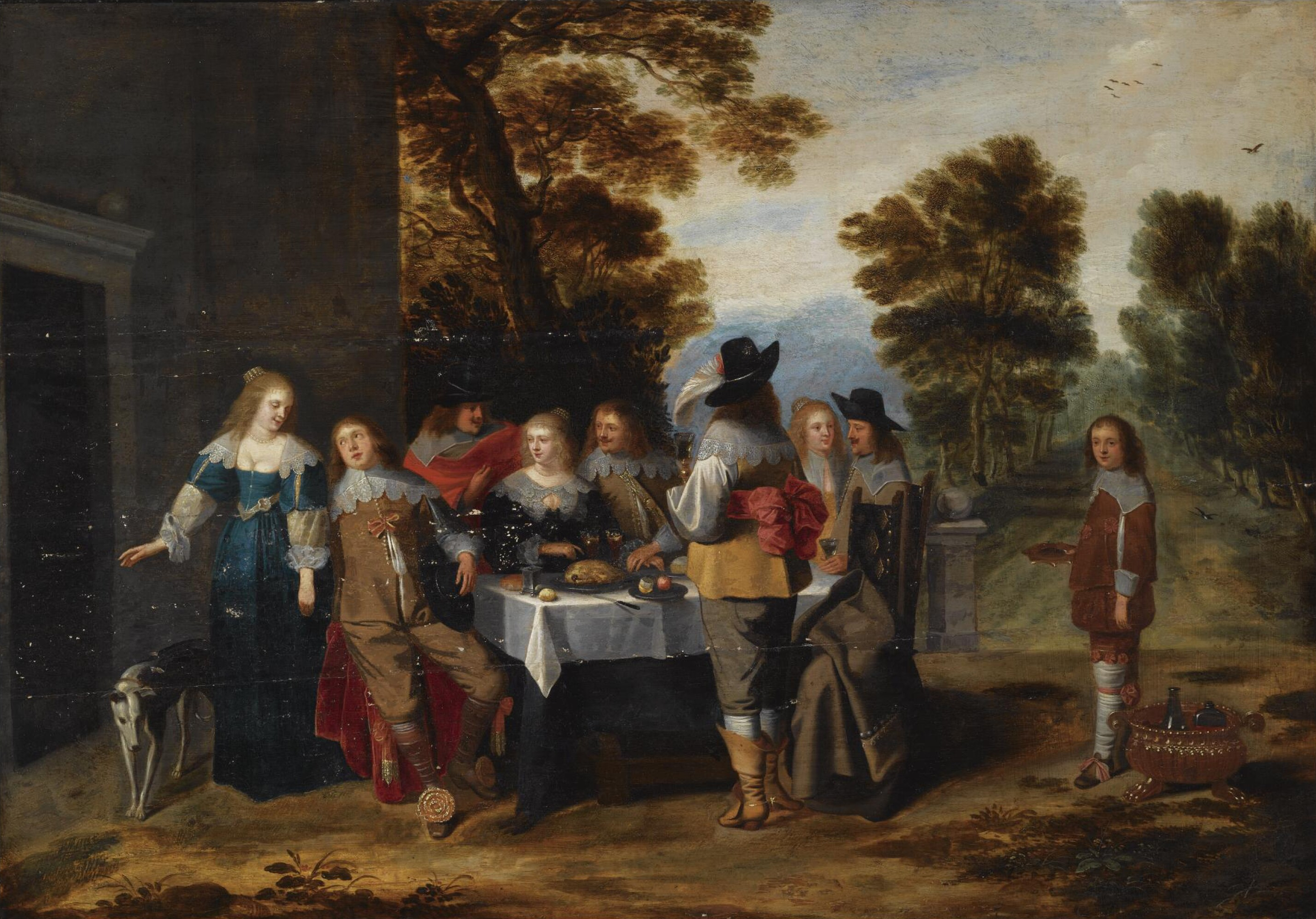
Elegant company around a table on a terrace

Van der Laemen returned regularly to the theme of the prodigal son. Of the known versions, one was sold at Christie's Amsterdam on 14 November 2007, lot 207, a second was sold at Christie's New York on 5 October 1995, lot 127 and a third one at Sotheby's London on 12 February 2008, lot 135. There is also a version in the Louvre. The various versions combine two of the key episodes from the story as told in the New Testament. In the background on the right is depicted the fate of the dissolute prodigal son after he had squandered all his money and had fallen on hard times. The young man is shown being chased out of a brothel. In the central scene in the foreground the young man is enjoying himself and spending his money on young girls, drink and gambling. Even while the picture does not directly reference the biblical story it is clear that the prodigal son has ended up in dubious company. An old woman, most likely a procuress, is encouraging a young boy to steal his purse. The story of the prodigal son offers the painter the opportunity to display his talents. The elegant figures with their colourful attire and the sumptuous still life (pronkstilleven) on the table add to the picture's charm. The man is holding a flute glass with red wine in his hand. The picture shows parallels to the merry company pieces by Dutch painters, such as Dirck Hals. Van der Laemen's style is, however, more painterly and swifter and looser, and he used a thick impasto. The contours are kept vague and this sfumato effect puts the figures into relief.

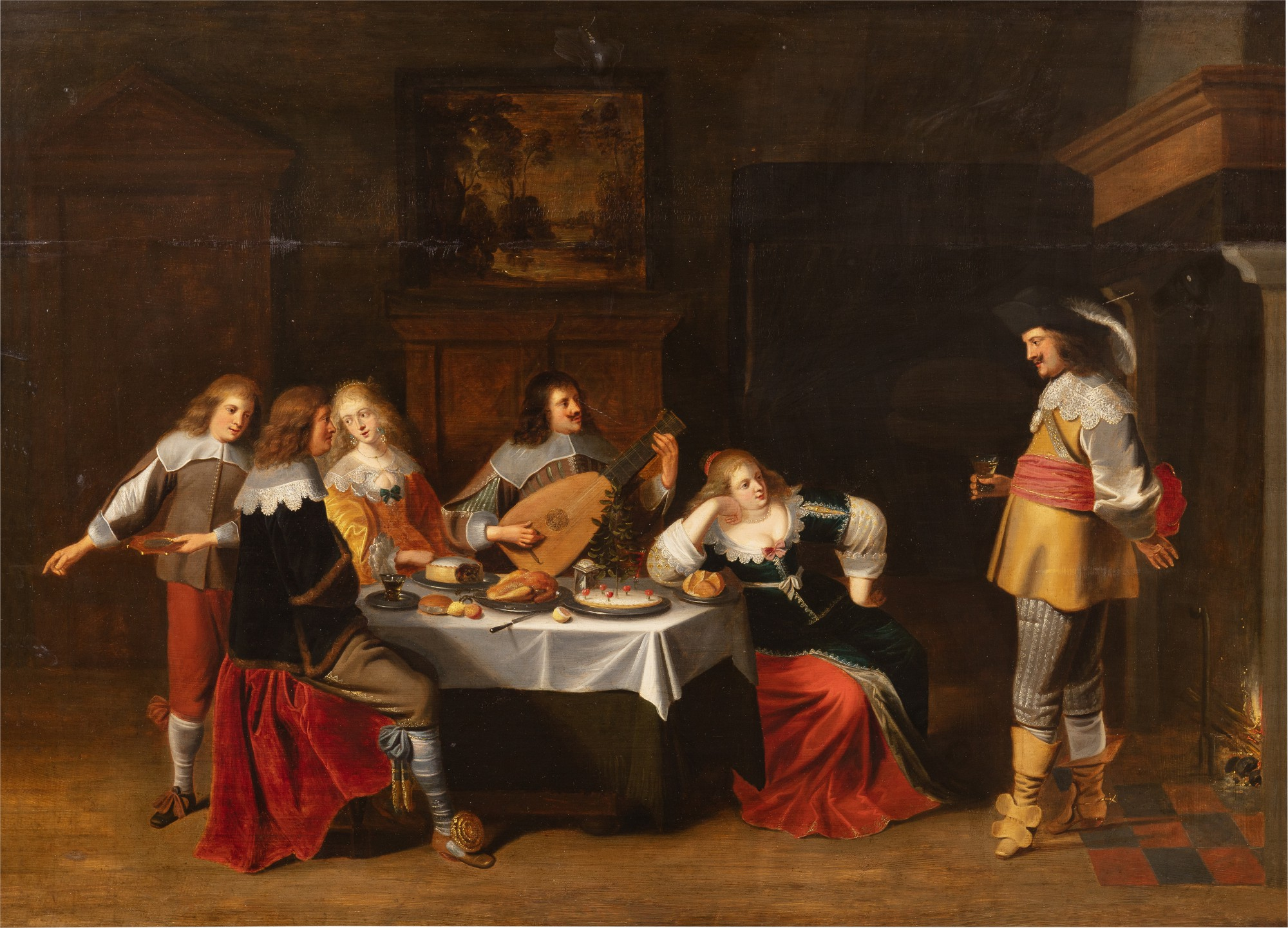
Elegant company in an interior making merry

It is believed that the Polish-Dutch genre painter Laurence Neter, who likely worked for a period of time in Middelburg near Antwerp, was influenced by the merry company paintings of van der Laemen. Neter likely was inspired by van der Laemen's motifs in his dancing scenes.
