= Silo =

Structure for storing crops

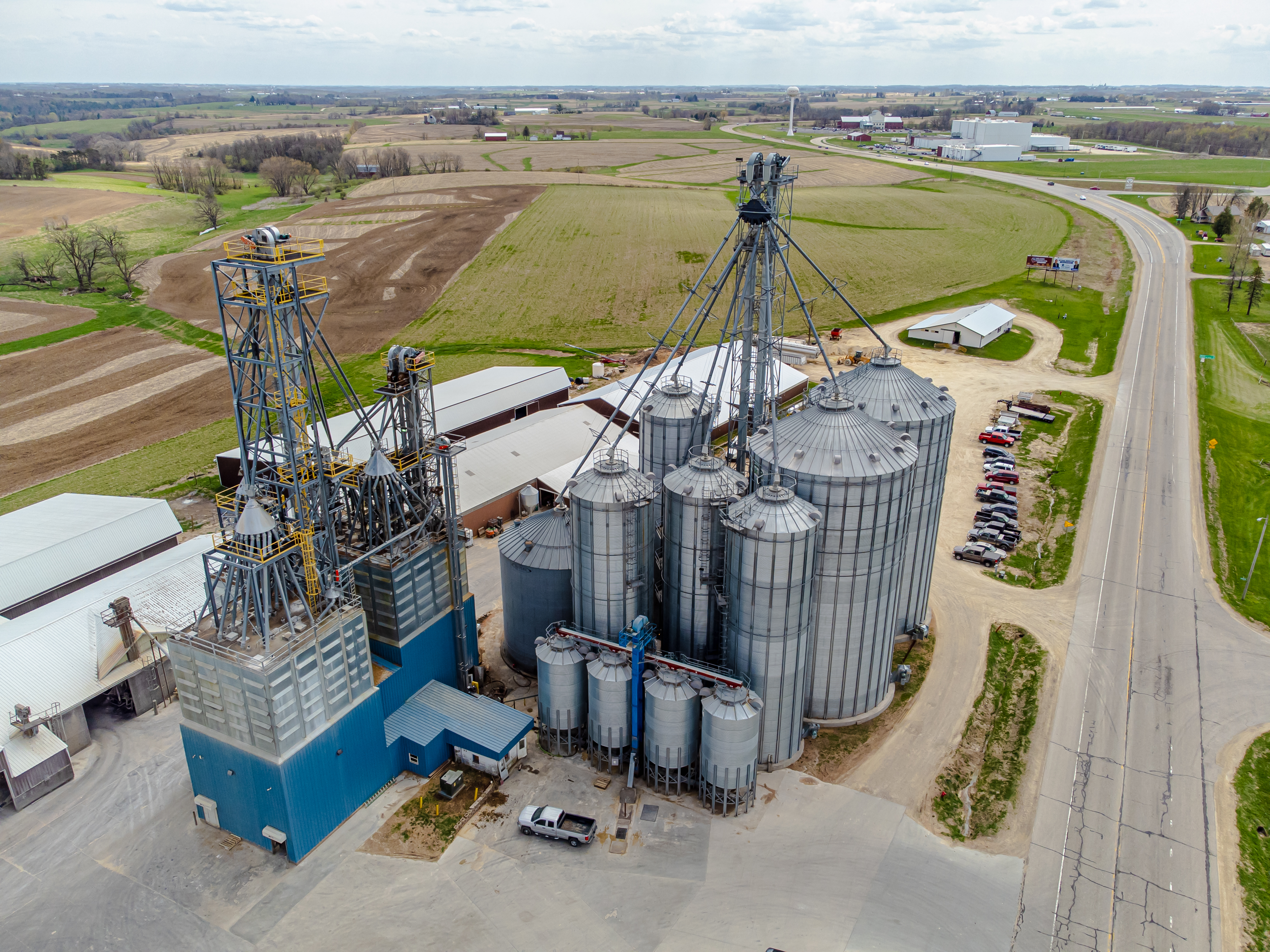
Grain bins in Cashton, Wisconsin

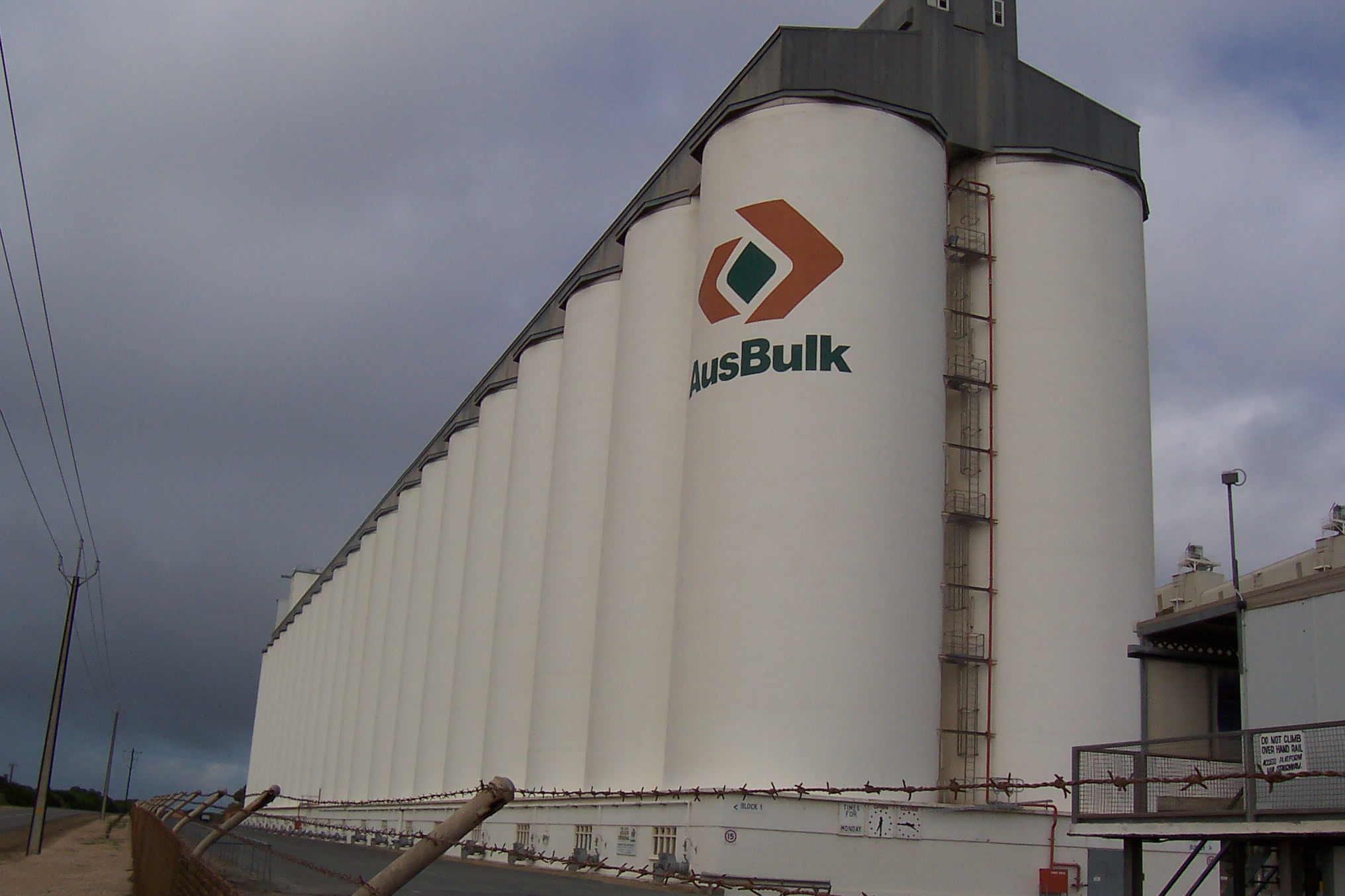
Grain elevators are composed of groups of grain silos, such as these at Port Giles, South Australia.

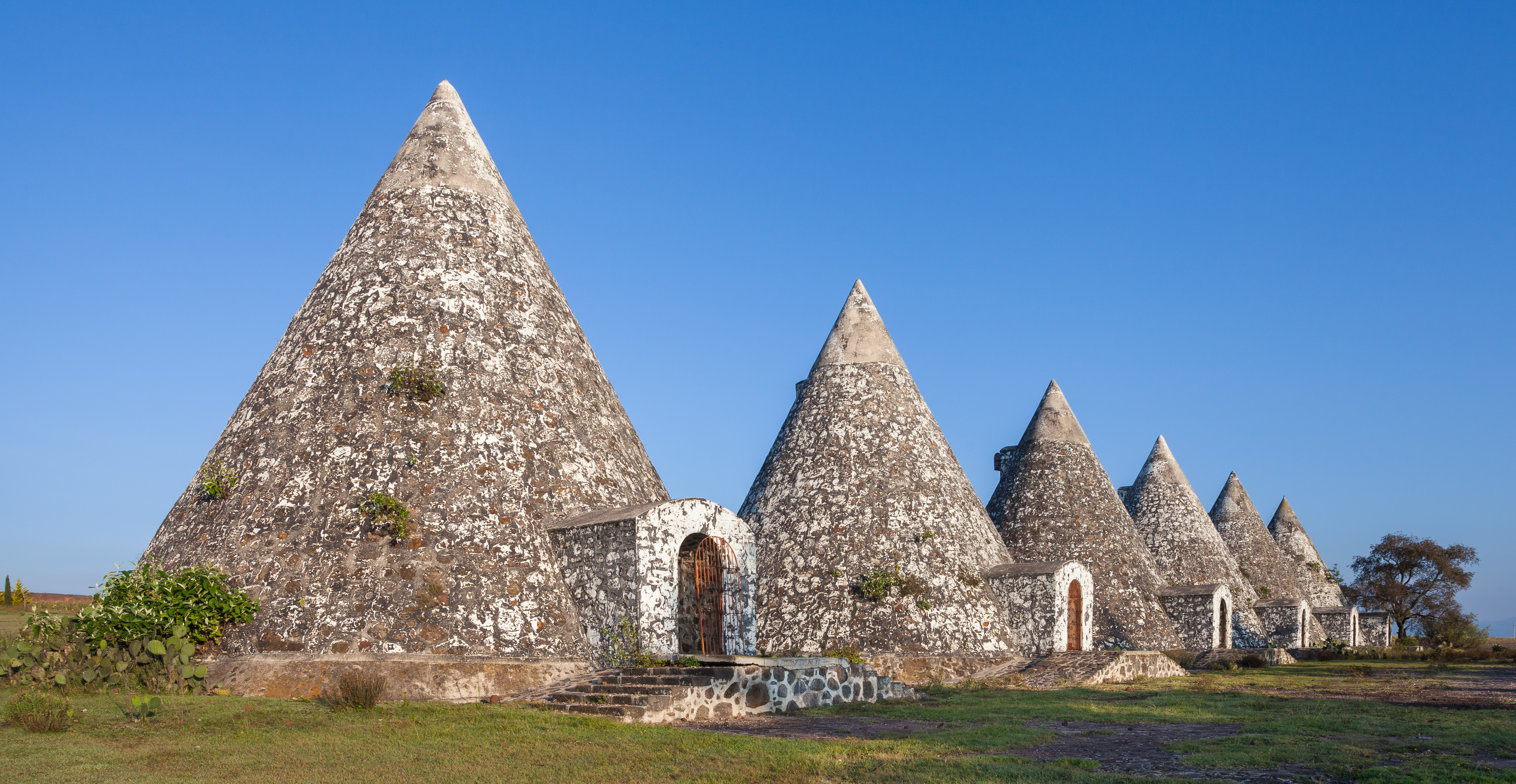
Silos in Acatlán, Hidalgo, Mexico

A silo (from Ancient Greek σιρός [sirós] 'pit for holding grain') is a structure for storing bulk materials.

Silos are commonly used for bulk storage of grain, coal, cement, carbon black, woodchips, food products, and sawdust. Three types of silos are in widespread use today: tower silos, bunker silos, and bag silos.

Silos are used in agriculture to store fermented feed known as silage.

== Types of silos ==
=== Tower silo ===
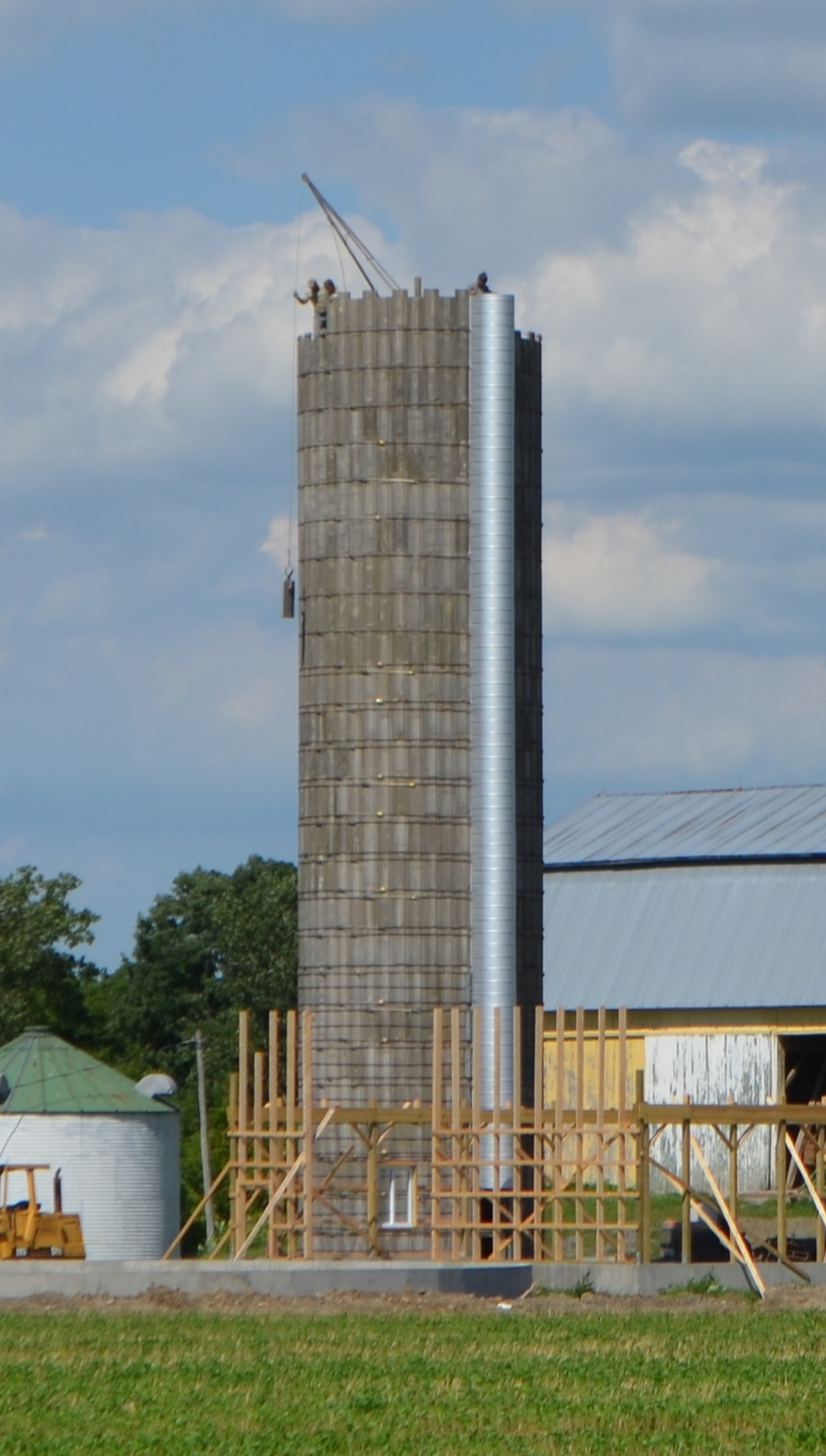
Concrete stave silo under construction in 2015

Storage silos are cylindrical structures, typically 10 to 90 ft (3 to 27 m) in diameter and 30 to 275 ft (10 to 90 m) in height; the taller and wider ones are of slipform and jumpform concrete. They can be made of many materials. Wood staves, concrete staves, cast concrete, and steel panels have all been used, and have varying cost, durability, and airtightness tradeoffs. Silos storing grain, cement, and woodchips are typically unloaded with air slides or augers. Silos can be unloaded into rail cars, trucks, or conveyors.

Tower silos containing silage are usually unloaded from the top of the pile, originally by hand using a silage fork—which has many more tines than the common pitchfork; 12 vs 4—and in modern times using mechanical unloaders. Bottom silo unloaders are utilized at times, but have problems with difficulty of repair.

An advantage of tower silos is that the silage tends to pack well due to its own weight, except in the top few feet. However, this may be a disadvantage for items like chopped wood. The tower silo was invented by Franklin Hiram King.

In Canada, Australia, and the United States, many country towns or the larger farms in grain-growing areas have groups of wooden or concrete tower silos, known as grain elevators, to collect grain from the surrounding towns and store and protect the grain for transportion by train, truck, or barge to a processor or to an export port. In bumper crop times, the excess grain is stored in piles without silos or bins, causing considerable losses.

==== Concrete stave silos ====
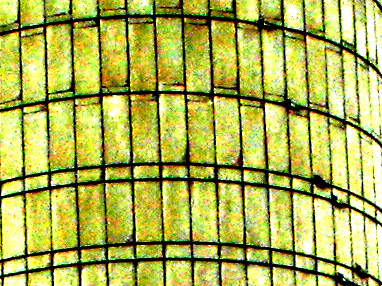
High contrast image showing the intermeshed concrete staves, and how the lower hoops are aligned over the stave edges.

Small stave silos can be expanded upward. More hoops are added to strengthen the lower staves.

Concrete stave silos are constructed from small precast concrete blocks with ridged grooves along each edge that lock them together into a high strength shell. Concrete is much stronger in compression than tension, so the silo is reinforced with steel hoops encircling the tower and compressing the staves into a tight ring. The vertical stacks are held together by intermeshing of the ends of the staves by a short distance around the perimeter of each layer, and hoops which are tightened directly across the stave edges.

The static pressure of the material inside the silo pressing outward on the staves increases towards the bottom of the silo, so the hoops can be spaced wide apart near the top but become progressively more closely spaced towards the bottom to prevent seams from opening and the contents leaking out.

Concrete stave silos are built from common components designed for high strength and long life. They have the flexibility to have their height increased according to the needs of the farm and purchasing power of the farmer, or to be completely disassembled and reinstalled somewhere else if no longer needed.

==== Low-oxygen tower silos ====
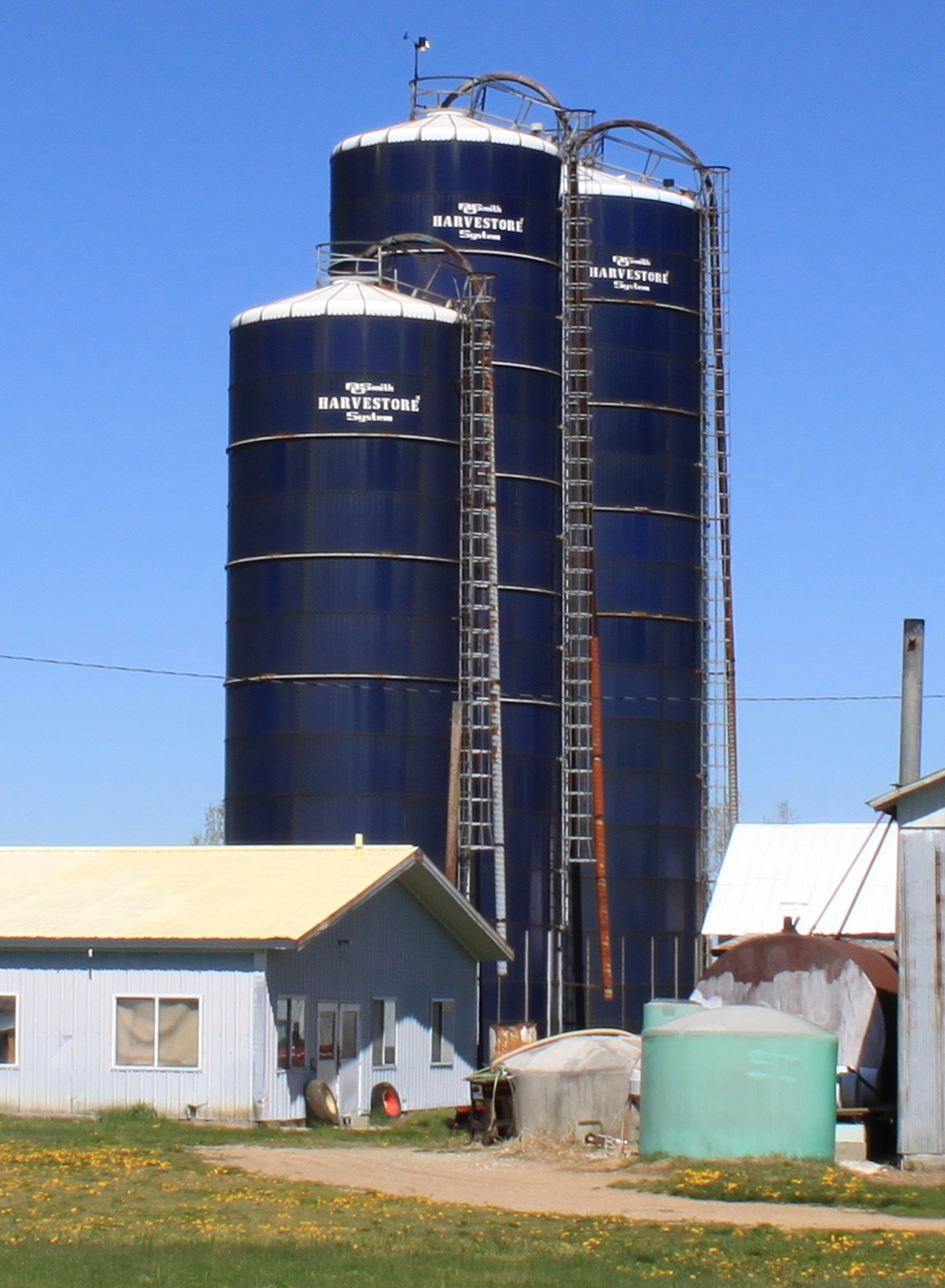
Low-oxygen Harvestore tower silos

Low-oxygen silos are designed to keep the contents in a low-oxygen atmosphere at all times, to keep the fermented contents in a high quality state, and to prevent mold and decay, as may occur in the top layers of a stave silo or bunker. Low-oxygen silos are only opened directly to the atmosphere during the initial forage loading, and even the unloader chute is sealed against air infiltration.

It would be expensive to design such a huge structure that is immune to atmospheric pressure changes over time. Instead, the silo structure is open to the atmosphere but outside air is separated from internal air by large impermeable bags sealed to the silo breather openings. In the warmth of the day when the silo is heated by the sun, the gas trapped inside the silo expands and the bags "breathe out" and collapse. At night the silo cools, the air inside contracts and the bags "breathe in" and expand again.

While the iconic blue Harvestore low-oxygen silos were once very common, the speed of its unloader mechanism was not able to match the output rates of modern bunker silos, and this type of silo went into decline. Unloader repair expenses also severely hurt the Harvestore reputation, because the unloader feed mechanism is located in the bottom of the silo under tons of silage. In the event of cutter chain breakage, it can cost up to US$10,000 to perform repairs. The silo may need to be partially or completely emptied by alternate means, to unbury the broken unloader and retrieve broken components lost in the silage at the bottom of the structure.

In 2005 the Harvestore company recognized these issues and worked to develop new unloaders with double the flow rate of previous models to stay competitive with bunkers, and with far greater unloader chain strength. They are now also using load sensing soft-start variable frequency drive motor controllers to reduce the likelihood of mechanism breakage, and to control the feeder sweep arm movement.

=== Bunker silos ===
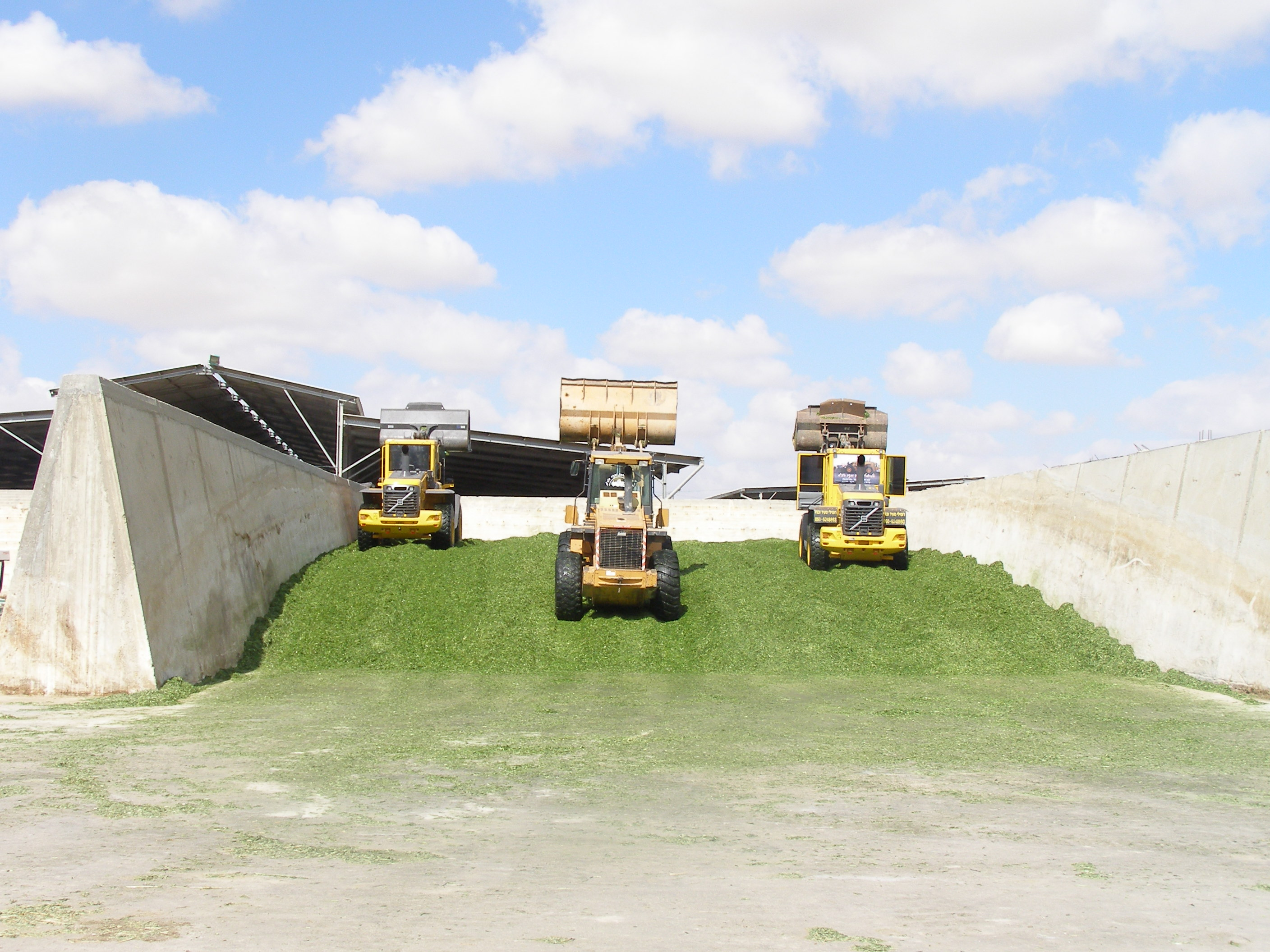
Bunker silo being filled and compacted.

Bunker silos are trenches, usually with concrete walls, that are filled and packed using tractors and loaders. The filled trench is covered with a plastic tarp to make it airtight. These silos are usually unloaded with a tractor and loader. They are inexpensive and especially well suited to very large operations.

=== Bag silos ===
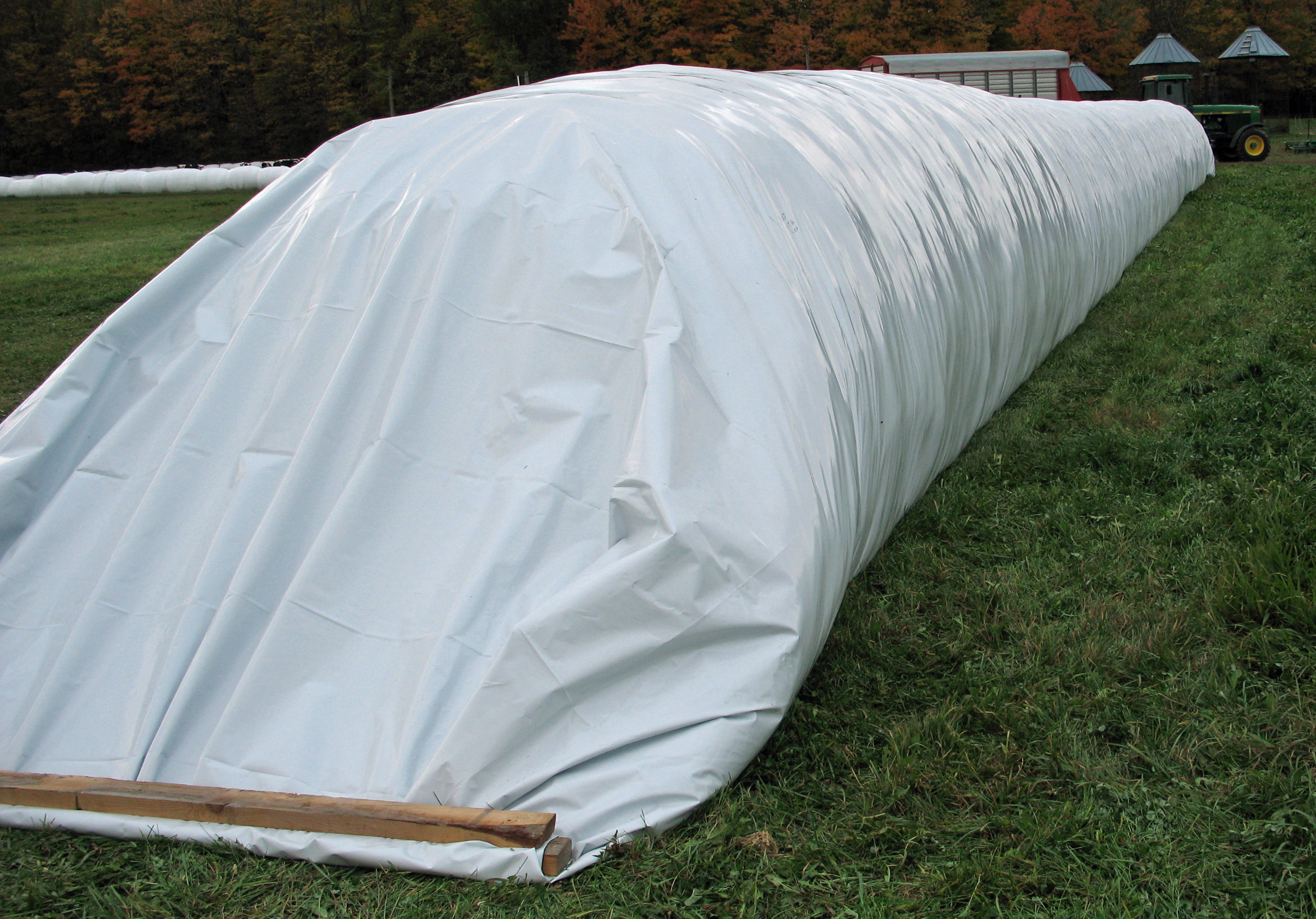
8 foot diameter by 150 foot silo bag shown just after filling and sealing.

Bag silos are heavy plastic tubes, usually around 8 to 12 ft (2.4 to 3.6 m) in diameter, and of variable length as required for the amount of material to be stored. They are packed using a machine made for the purpose, and sealed on both ends. They are unloaded using a tractor and loader or skid-steer loader. The bag is discarded in sections as it is torn off. Bag silos require little capital investment. They can be used as a temporary measure when growth or harvest conditions require more space, though some farms use them every year.

=== Grain bins ===
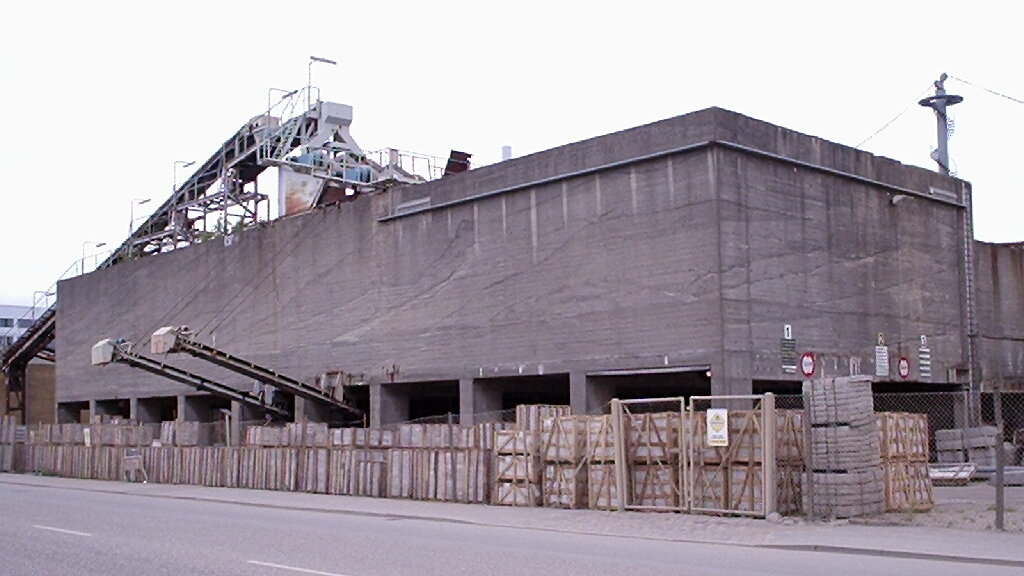
This bin contains 27 variations of stone, sand and gravel, Copenhagen, Denmark

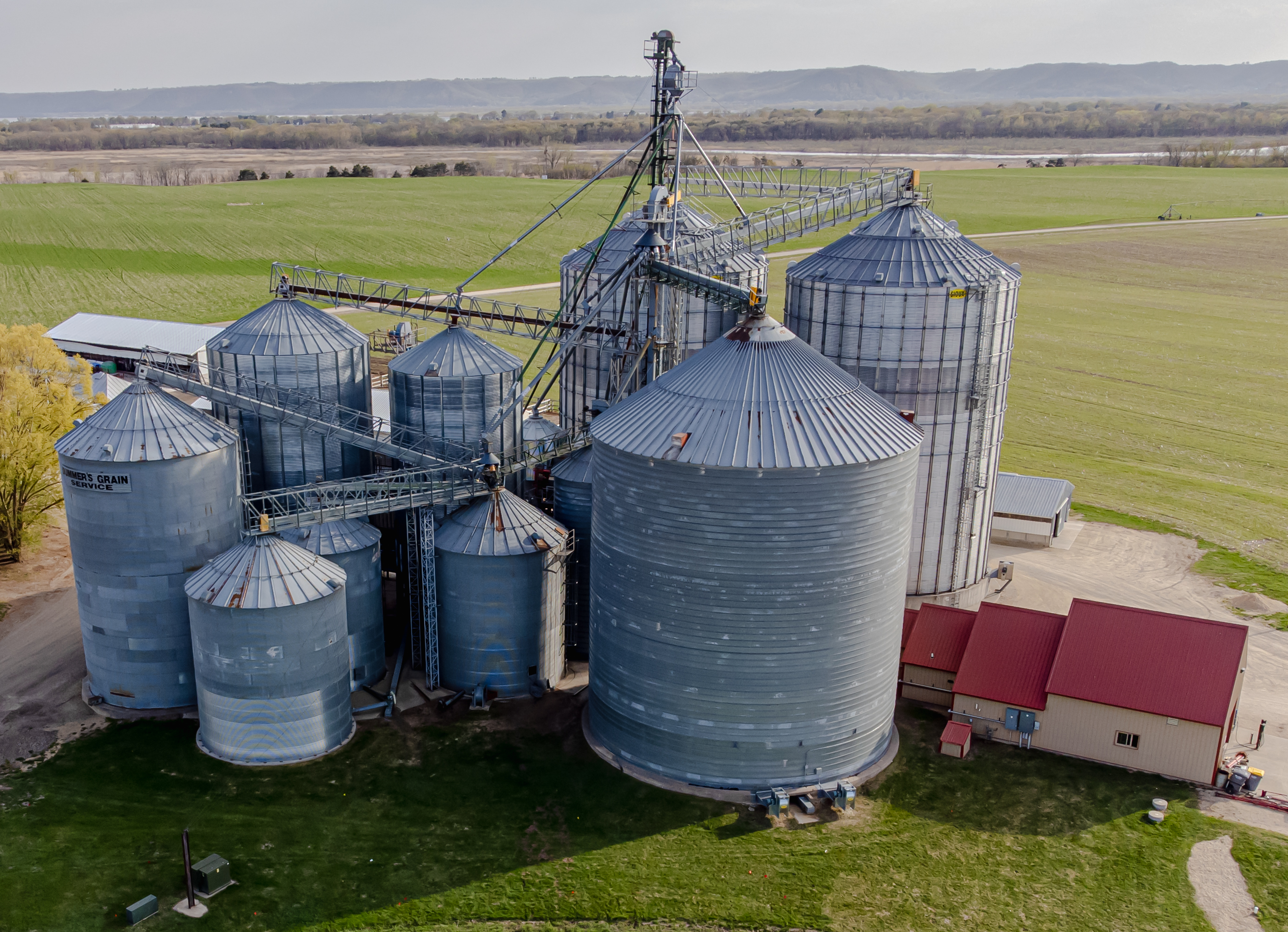
Grain bins in Holmen, Wisconsin

A grain bin is typically much shorter than a silo, and is typically used for holding dry matter such as cement or grain. Grain is often dried in a grain dryer before being stored in the bin. Bins may be round or square, but round bins tend to empty more easily due to a lack of corners for the stored material to become wedged and encrusted.

The stored material may be powdered, as seed kernels, or as cob corn. Due to the dry nature of the stored material, it tends to be lighter than silage and can be more easily handled by under-floor grain unloaders. To facilitate drying after harvesting, some grain bins contain a hollow perforated or screened central shaft to permit easier air infiltration into the stored grain.

=== Cement storage silos ===
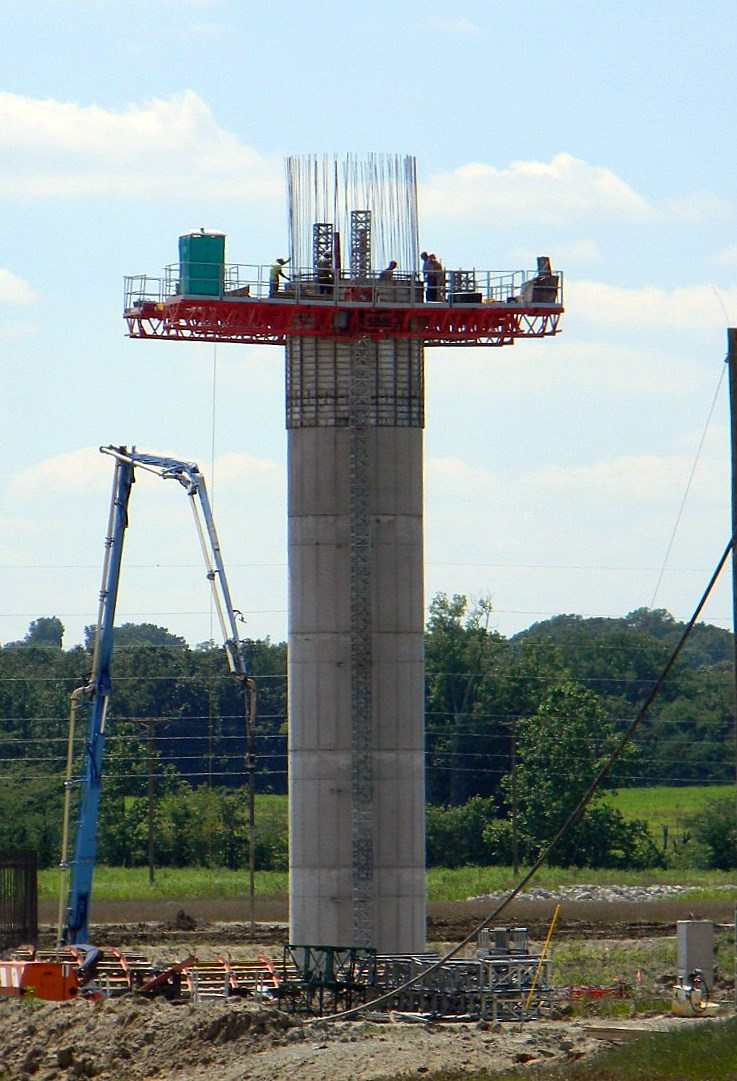
Coal silo under construction using aluminum concrete formwork

There are different types of cement silos such as the low-level mobile silo and the static upright cement silo, which are used to hold and discharge cement and other powder materials such as pulverised fuel ash (PFA). The low-level silos are fully mobile with capacities from 100 to 750 tons. They are simple to transport and are easy to set up on site. These mobile silos generally come equipped with an electronic weighing system with digital display and printer. This allows any quantity of cement or powder discharged from the silo to be controlled and also provides an accurate indication of what remains inside the silo. The static upright silos have capacities from 200 to 800 tons. These are considered a low-maintenance option for the storage of cement or other powders. Cement silos can be used in conjunction with bin-fed batching plants.

=== Sand and salt silos ===
Sand and salt for winter road maintenance are stored in conical dome-shaped (clear truss roof) silos. These are more common in North America, namely in Canada and the United States. The shape is based on the natural shape formed when piling solids. The dome is made of prefabricated wood panels with shingles installed on a circular reinforced concrete base. An open canopy entrance allows front end loaders to fill and retrieve easily. These are usually found along major highway or key primary roads.

=== Plastic silos ===
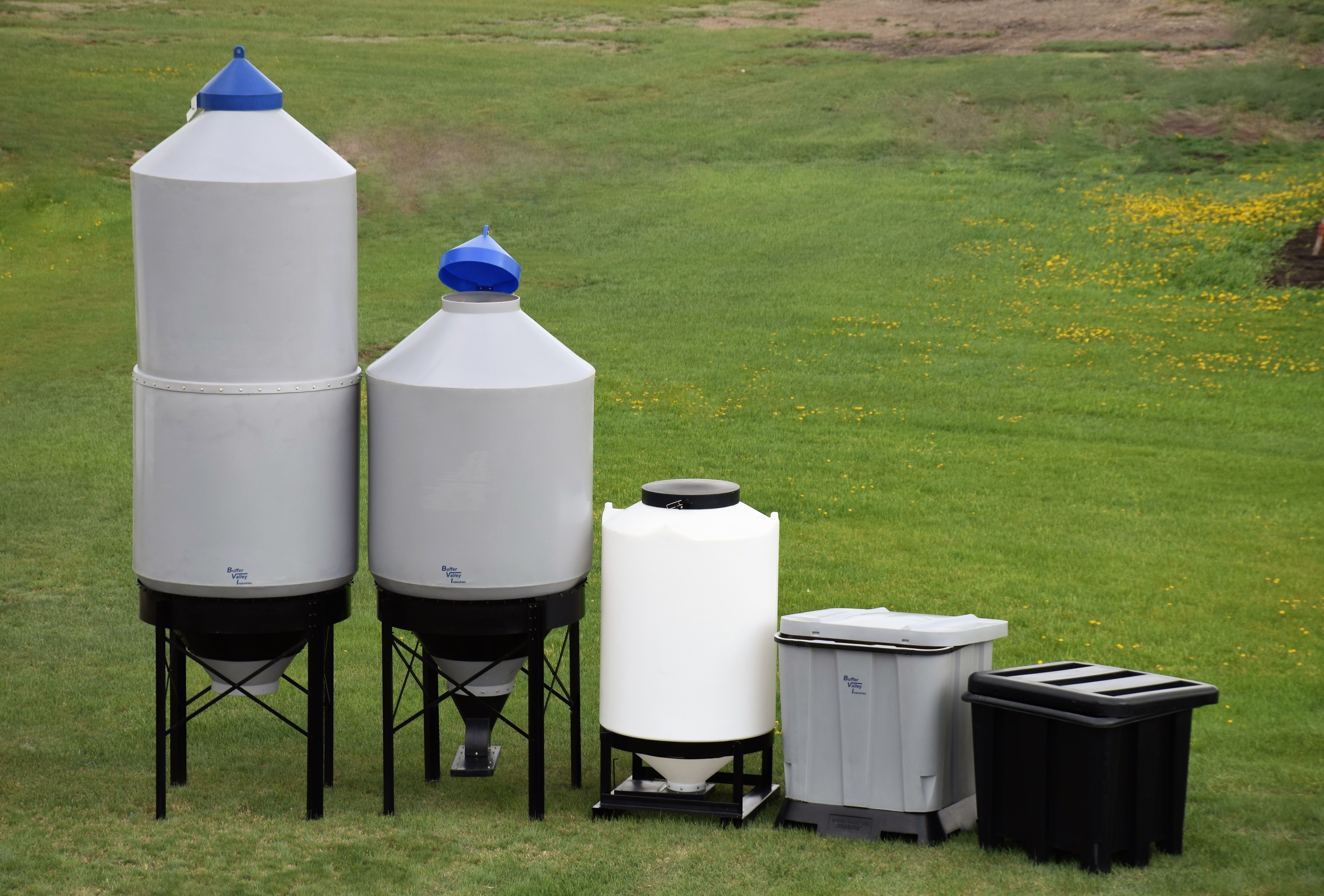
A wide variety of plastic grain bins manufactured by Buffer Valley Industries in Saskatchewan, Canada.

Plastic silos, also known as hopper bottom tanks, are manufactured through various processes such as: injection molding, rotational molding, and blow molding. They are constructed using a wide variety of polyethylene plastics. The silos are light weight and make for great small scale storage for farmers with livestock and grain operations. The light weight design and cost effective materials make plastic silos a great alternative to traditional steel bins. Unlike fabric silos, which "tend to be prone to grain rot and pests which have left many farmers frustrated", plastic silos are more safe and secure, keeping grain fresh and unspoiled. They can be designed to be stationary hopper bottom bins or portable pallet bins.

=== Fabric silos ===
Fabric silos are constructed of a fabric bag suspended within a rigid, structural frame. Polyester based fabrics are often used for fabrication of the bag material, with specific attention given to fabric pore size. Upper areas of silo fabric are often manufactured with slightly larger pore size, with the design intent of acting as a vent filter during silo filling. Some designs include metal thread within the fabric, providing a static conductive path from the surface of the fabric to ground. The frame of a fabric silo is typically constructed of steel. Fabric silos are an attractive option because of their relative low cost compared to conventional silos. However, when fabric silos are used to store granular or particulate combustible materials, conventional practices prescribed by established industry consensus standards addressing combustible dust hazards can not be applied without a considerable engineering analysis of the system.

=== Flexible silo storage system ===
Flexible silos are the most versatile and cost-effective solution for the storage of bulk powder and granules. Manufactured from trevira tissue, a tough non-toxic fabric, the silos can handle particle size down to 2 microns and can be pneumatically loaded without the need for a dust collector. The 45-degree fabric silo cone flexes freely when the product discharges, enabling the efficient flow of hard to handle products such as sugar, flour, calcium carbonate etc., minimally assisted by a small vibrator fitted to the discharge transition. The trevira tissue is able to breathe, preventing condensation from forming on its internal walls. This eliminates lumping and caking of the product.

=== Rigid silos ===
With sizes ranging from 2m^{3} to over 1000m^{3}, Rigid Silos cover an extreme range of applications and they can be constructed from various materials. Rigid silos can be provided with more than one vertical partition to compartmentalize it for different grades of product.

== History ==
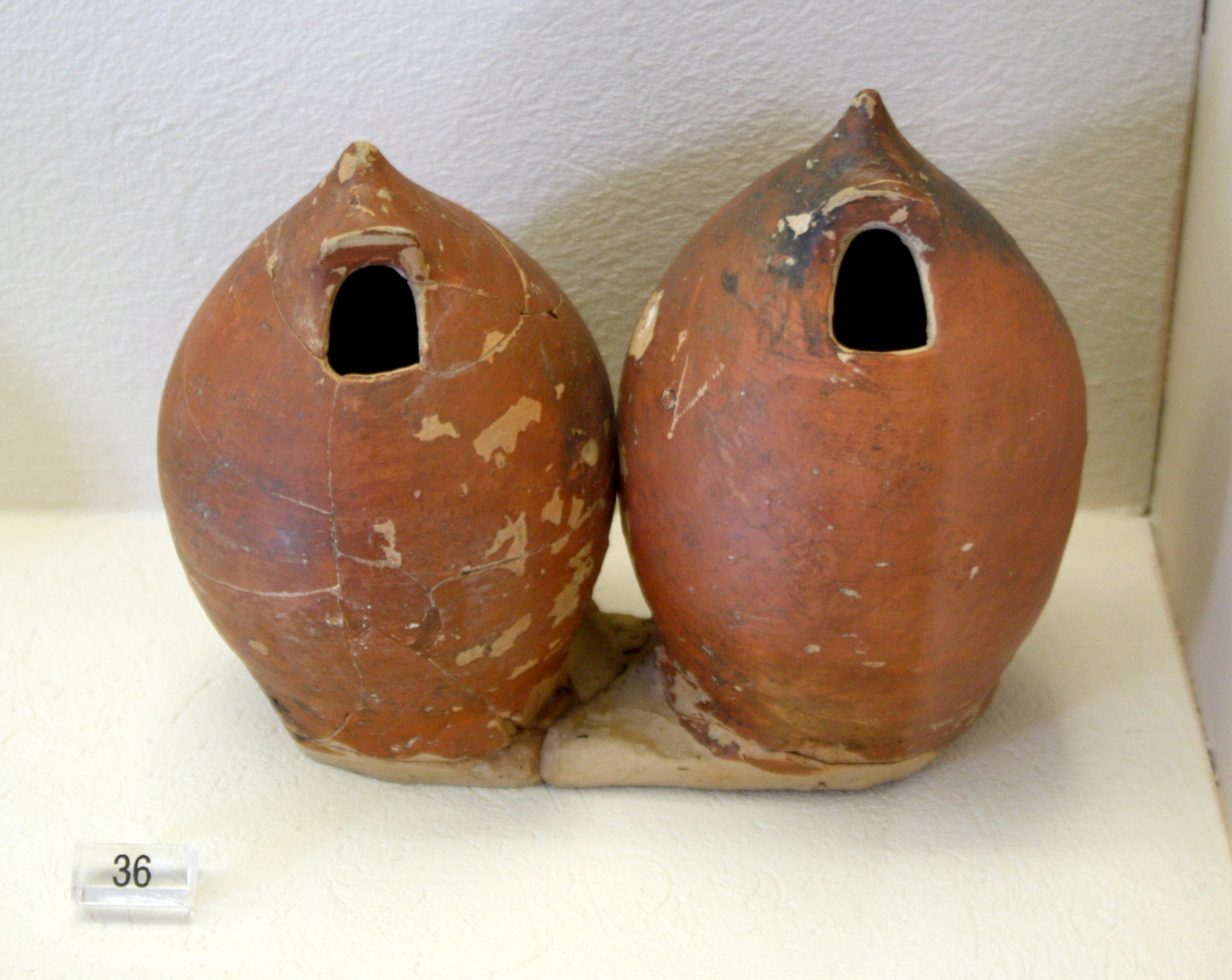
Ancient Greek vases shaped as grain silos, 700/650 BC, Kerameikos Archaeological Museum, Athens.

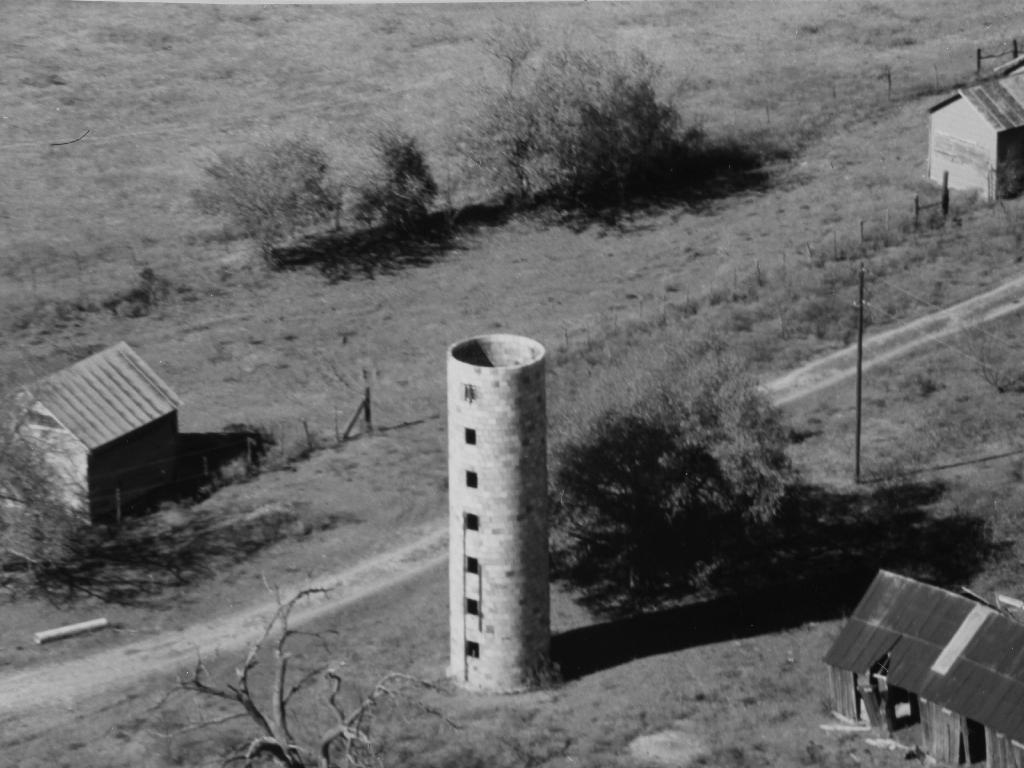
Silo 3.5 miles southeast of Blooming Grove, Texas, built ca. 1900 by F. B. Cumpston. Used mainly for corn.

The 5th millennium BC site of Tel Tsaf in the southern Levant contains the earliest known silos. Archaeological ruins and ancient texts show that silos were used in ancient Greece as far back as the late 8th century BC; the term silo is derived from the Greek σιρός (siros), "pit for holding grain".

The silo pit, as it has been termed, has been a favorite way of storing grain from time immemorial in Asia. In Anatolia and Persia, insurance agents bought stores of wheat or barley whilst comparatively cheap, and stored them in hidden pits against seasons of dearth. In Malta a relatively large stock of wheat was preserved in some hundreds of pits (silos) cut in the rock. A single silo stored from 60 to 80 tons of wheat, which, with proper precautions, kept in good condition for four years or more.

The first modern silo, a wooden and upright one filled with grain, was invented and built in 1873 in Spring Grove, Illinois by Fred Hatch of McHenry County, Illinois, US.

== Forage silo usage ==
=== Forage harvesting ===
Video of a PTO-driven towed New Holland forage harvester, John Deere 4020 tractor, and Gehl forage wagon.

Forage silo filling is performed using a forage harvester which may either be self-propelled with an engine and driver's cab or towed behind a tractor that supplies power through a PTO.

The harvester contains a drum-shaped series of cutting knives which shear the fibrous plant material into small pieces no more than an inch long, to facilitate mechanized blowing and transport via augers. The finely chopped plant material is then blown by the harvester into a forage wagon which contains an automatic unloading system.

=== Tower filling ===
Short video of the steps involved for filling a farm tower silo.

Tower forage filling is typically performed with a silo blower which is a very large fan with paddle-shaped blades. Material is fed into a vibrating hopper and is pushed into the blower using a spinning spiral auger.

There is commonly a water connection on the blower to add moisture to the plant matter being blown into the silo. The blower may be driven by an electric motor but it is more common to use a spare tractor instead.

A large slow-moving conveyor chain underneath the silage in the forage wagon moves the pile towards the front, where rows of rotating teeth break up the pile and drop it onto a high-speed transverse conveyor that pours the silage out the side of the wagon into the blower hopper.

=== Bag filling ===
Silo bags are filled using a traveling sled driven from the PTO of a tractor left in neutral which is gradually pushed forward as the bag is filled. The steering of the tractor controls the direction of bag placement as it fills, but bags are normally laid in a straight line.

The bag is loaded using the same forage harvesting methods as the tower, but the forage wagon must be moved progressively forward with the bag loader. The loader uses an array of rotating cam-shaped spiraled teeth associated with large comb-shaped tines to push forage into the bag. The forage is pushed in through a large opening, and as the teeth rotate back out, they pass between the comb tines. The cam-shaped auger teeth essentially wipe the forage off using the steel tines, keeping the forage in the bag.

Before filling begins, the entire bag is placed onto the loader as a bunched-up tube folded back on itself in many layers to form a thick pile of plastic. Because the plastic is minimally elastic, the loader mechanism filling chute is slightly smaller than the final size of the bag, to accommodate this stack of plastic around the mouth of the loader. The plastic slowly unfurls itself around the edges of the loader as the tube is filled.

The contents of the silo bag are under pressure as it is filled, with the pressure controlled by a large brake shoe pressure regulator, holding back two large winch drums on either side of the loader. Cables from the drum extend to the rear of the bag where a large mesh basket holds the rear end of the bag shut.

To prevent molding and to assure an airtight seal during fermentation, the ends of the silo bag tube are gathered, folded, and tied shut to prevent oxygen from entering the bag. Removal of the bag loader can be hazardous to bystanders since the pressure must be released and the rear end allowed to collapse onto the ground.

=== Tower unloading ===
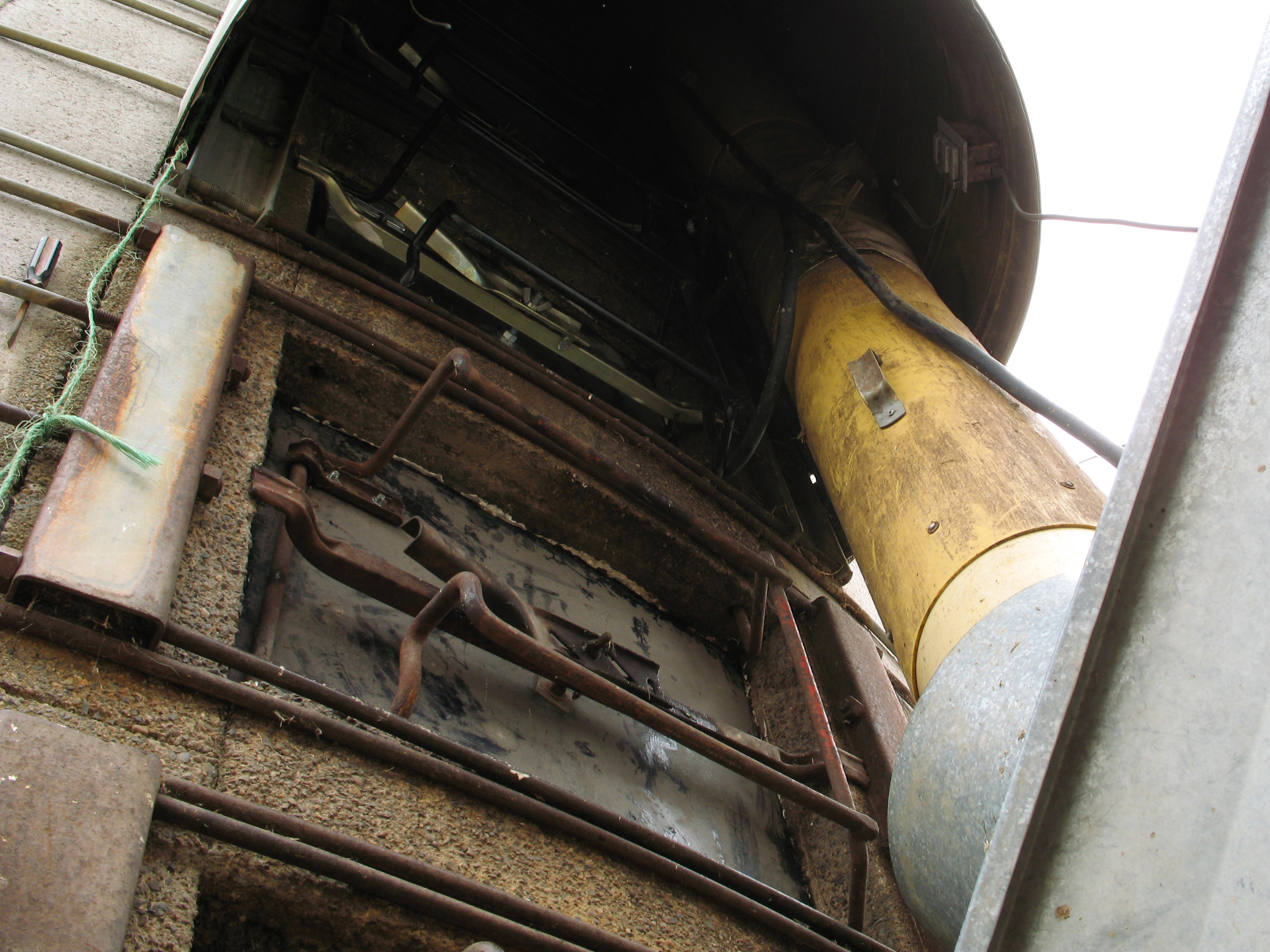
View of silo unloader doors, silage drop tube, and paddle conveyor leading into barn.

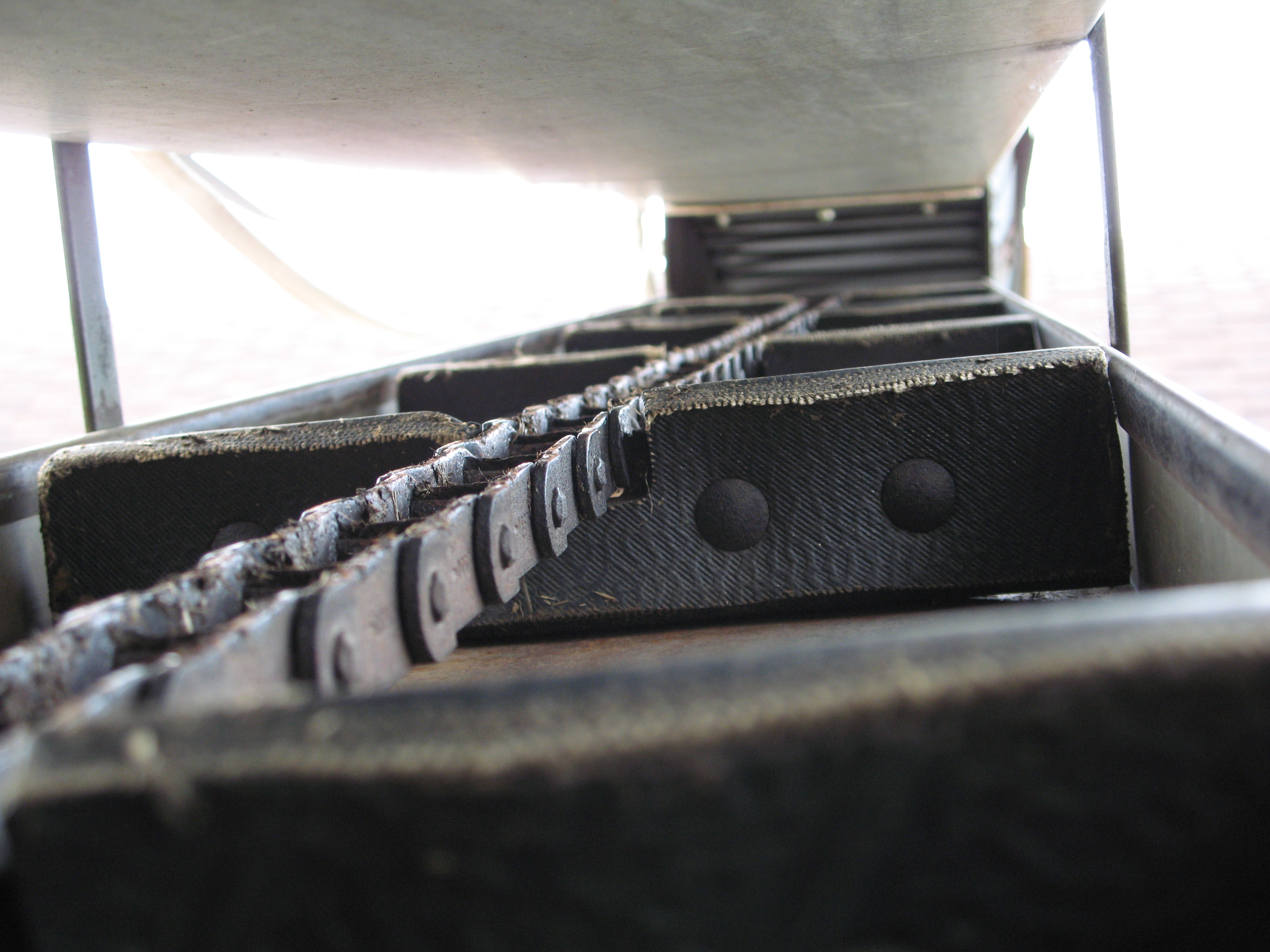
Interior view of silo unloader conveyor paddles and drive chain.

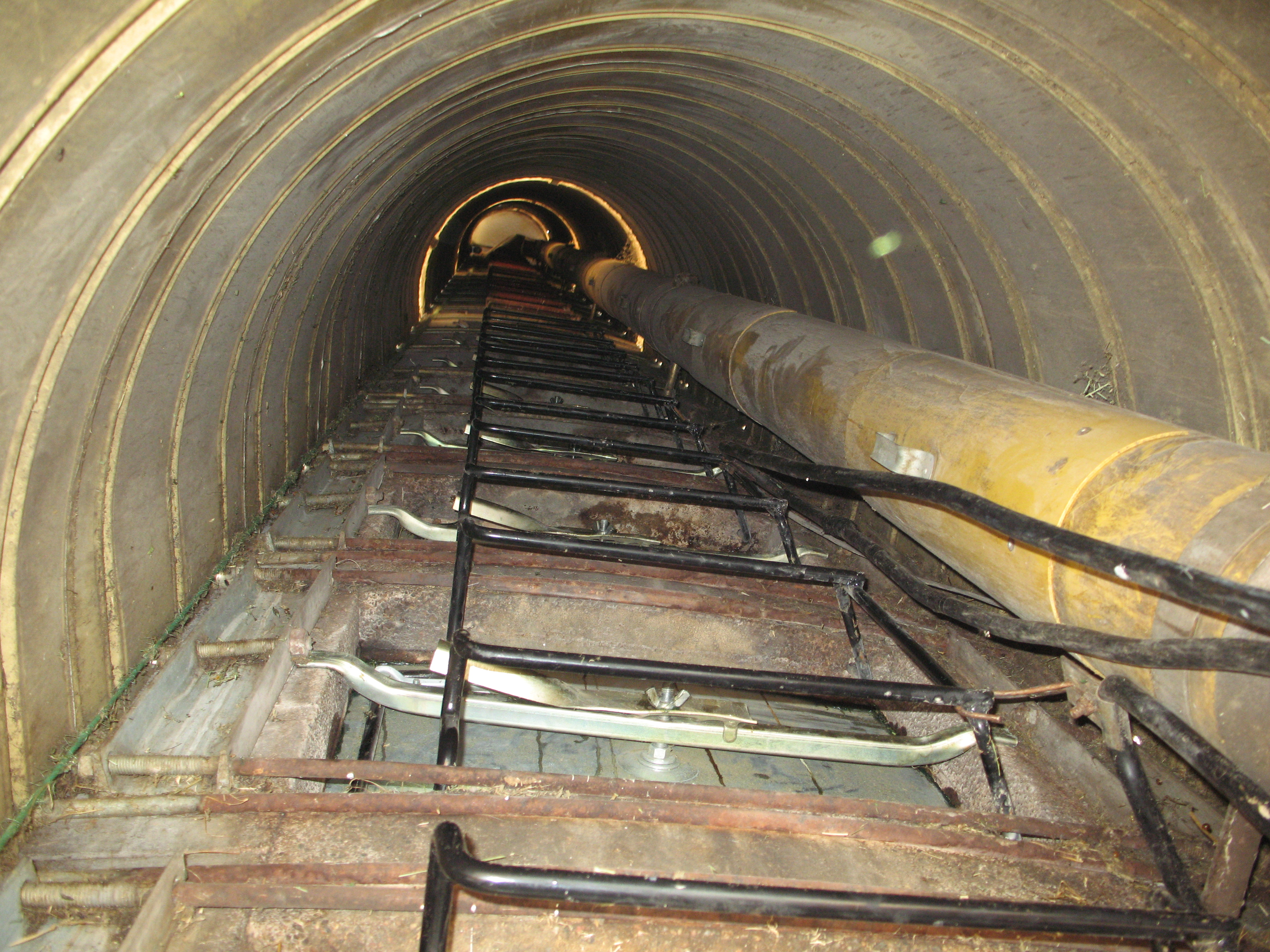
View of doors under shroud. Due to the limited space, the door hinge frame is also the ladder. On the right is the unloader power cable and yellow silage drop tube with removable access doors for insertion of the silage drop spout.

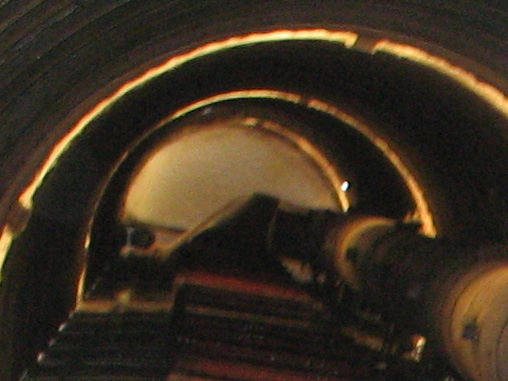
View of the silo unloader drop chute inserted into the very top of the silage drop tube 60ft up. The tube is illuminated by light entering through fiberglass panels every 20ft along the outer steel shroud.

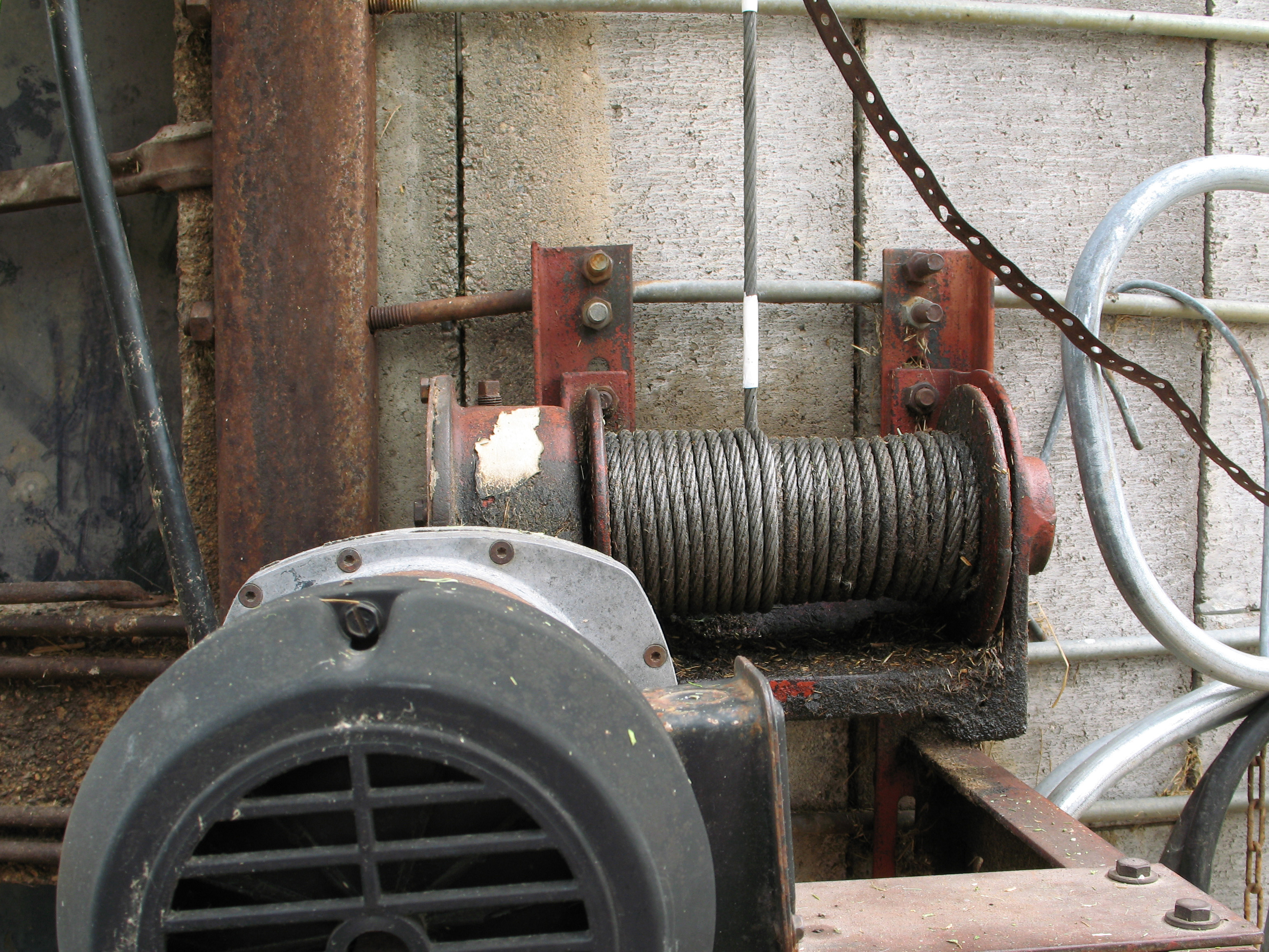
Electric winch for raising and lowering silo unloader.

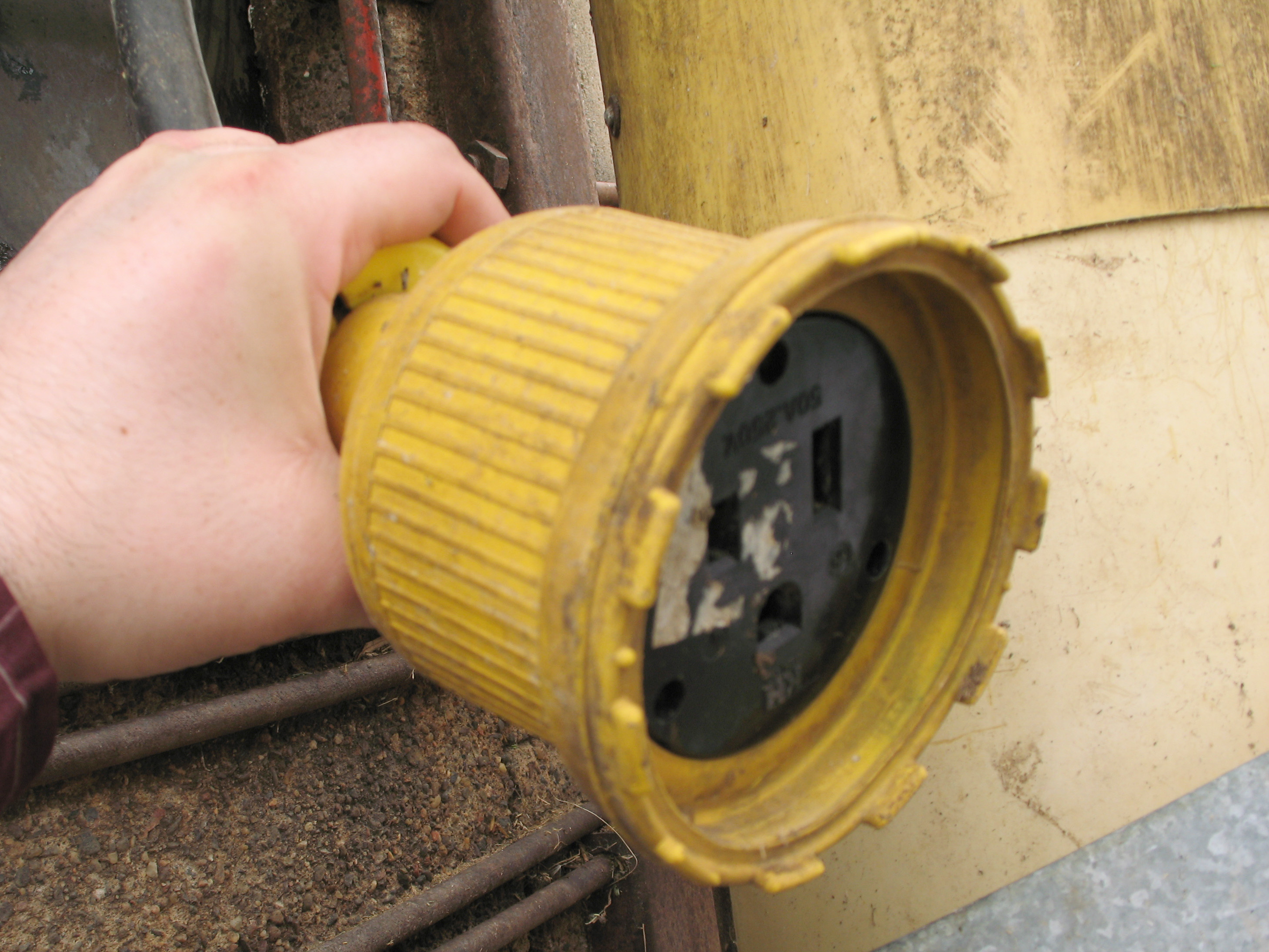
50 amp, 250 volt unloader power socket, with shroud to keep out debris.

A silo unloader specifically refers to a special cylindrical rotating forage pickup device used inside a single tower silo.

The main operating component of the silo unloader is suspended in the silo from a steel cable on a pulley that is mounted in the top-center of the roof of the silo. The vertical positioning of the unloader is controlled by an electric winch on the exterior of the silo.

For the summer filling of a tower silo, the unloader is winched as high as possible to the top of the silo and put into a parking position. The silo is filled with a silo blower, which is a very large fan that blows a large volume of pressurized air up a 10-inch tube on the side of the silo. A small amount of water is introduced into the air stream during filling to help lubricate the filling tube. A small adjustable nozzle at the top, controlled by a handle at the base of the silo, directs the silage to fall into the silo on the near, middle, or far side, to facilitate evenly layered loading. Once completely filled, the top of the exposed silage pile is covered with a large heavy sheet of silo plastic which seals out oxygen and permits the entire pile to begin to ferment in the autumn.

In the winter when animals must be kept indoors, the silo plastic is removed, the unloader is lowered down onto the top of the silage pile, and a hinged door is opened on the side of the silo to permit the silage to be blown out. There is an array of these access doors arranged vertically up the side of the silo, with an unloading tube next to the doors that has a series of removable covers down the side of the tube. The unloader tube and access doors are normally covered with a large U-shaped shield mounted on the silo, to protect the farmer from wind, snow, and rain while working on the silo.

The silo unloader mechanism consists of a pair of counter-rotating toothed augers which rip up the surface of the silage and pull it towards the center of the unloader. The toothed augers rotate in a circle around the center hub, evenly chewing the silage off the surface of the pile. In the center, a large blower assembly picks up the silage and blows it out the silo door, where the silage falls by gravity down the unloader tube to the bottom of the silo, typically into an automated conveyor system.

The unloader is typically lowered only a half-inch or so at a time by the operator, and the unloader picks up only a small amount of material until the winch cable has become taut and the unloader is not picking up any more material. The operator then lowers the unloader another half-inch or so and the process repeats. If lowered too far, the unloader can pull up much more material than it can handle, which can overflow and plug up the blower, outlet spout, and the unloader tube, resulting in a time-wasting process of having to climb up the silo to clear the blockages.

Once silage has entered the conveyor system, it can be handled by either manual or automatic distribution systems. The simplest manual distribution system uses a sliding metal platform under the pickup channel. When slid open, the forage drops through the open hole and down a chute into a wagon, wheelbarrow, or open pile. When closed, the forage continues past the opening and onward to other parts of the conveyor. Computer automation and a conveyor running the length of a feeding stall can permit the silage to be automatically dropped from above to each animal, with the amount dispensed customized for each location.

== Safety ==
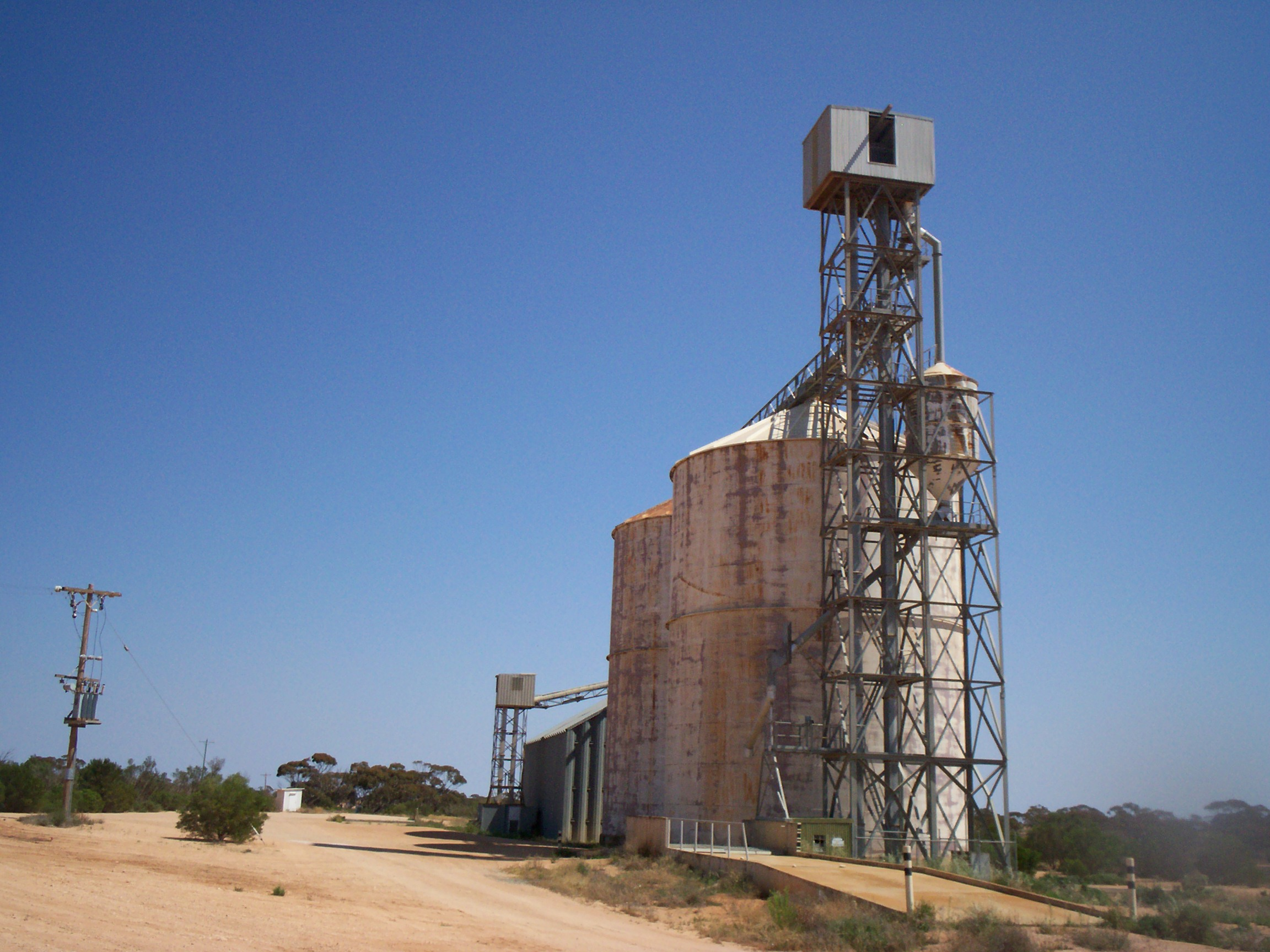
Defunct elevator in Merrinee, Victoria, Australia.

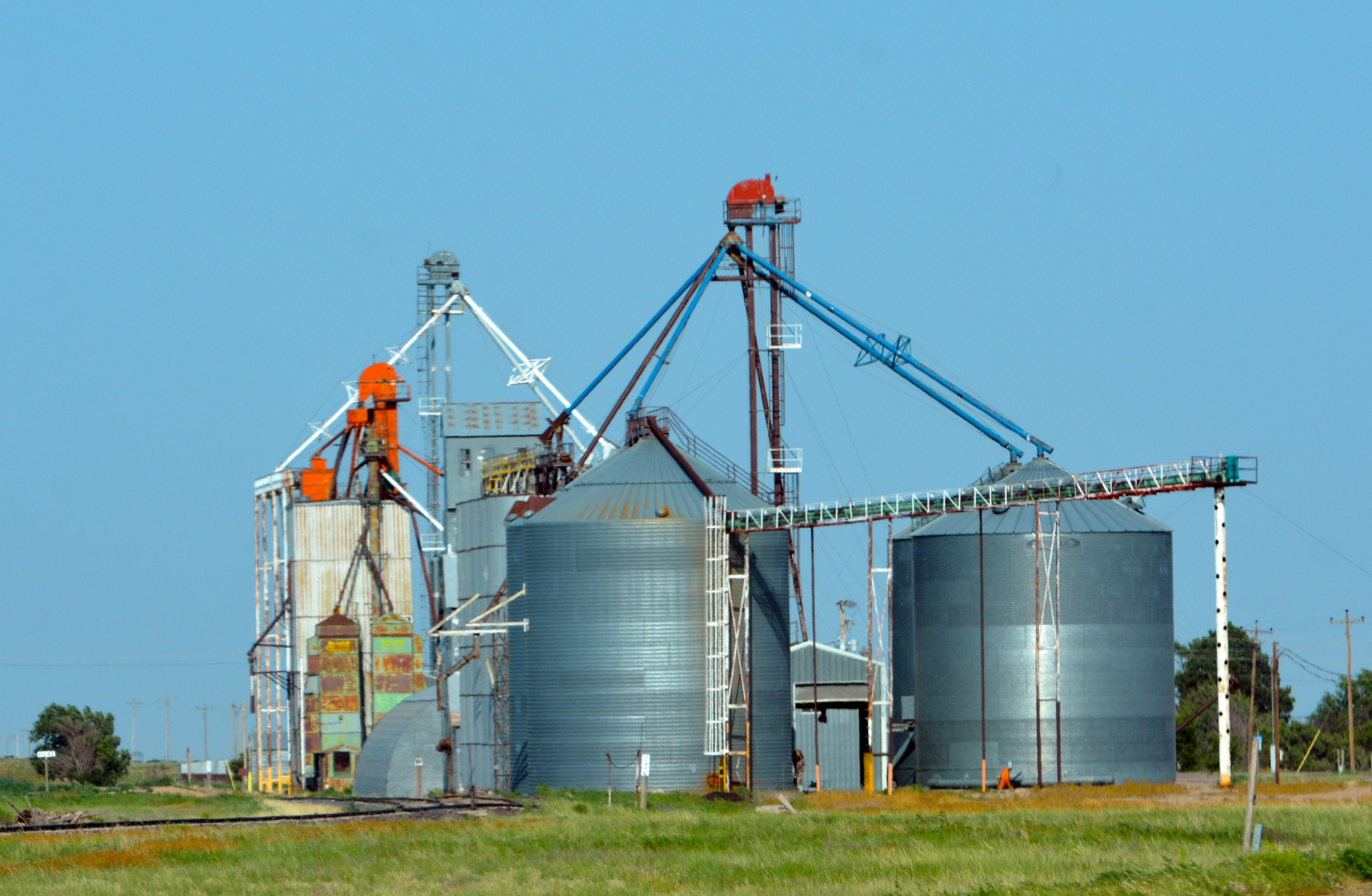
A grain elevator in Nebraska, June 2015

Silos are hazardous, and people are killed or injured every year in the process of filling and maintaining them. The machinery used is dangerous, and workers can fall from a tower silo's ladder or work platform. Several fires have occurred over the years.

=== Dangers of loading process ===
Filling a silo requires parking two tractors very close to each other, both running at full power with live PTO shafts, one powering the silo blower and the other powering a forage wagon unloading fresh-cut forage into the blower. The farmer must continually move around in this highly hazardous environment of spinning shafts and high-speed conveyors to check material flows and adjust speeds, and occasionally starting and stop all the equipment between loads.

Preparation for filling a silo requires winching the unloader to the top, and any remaining forage at the base that the unloader could not pick up must be removed from the floor of the silo. This job requires that the farmer work directly underneath a machine weighing several tons suspended fifty feet or more overhead from a small steel cable. Should the unloader fall, the farmer will likely be killed instantly.

=== Dangers of unloading process ===
Unloading also poses its own special hazards, due to the requirement that the farmer regularly climb the silo to close an upper door and open a lower door, moving the unloader chute from door to door in the process. The fermentation of the silage produces methane gas which over time will outgas and displace the oxygen in the top of the silo. A farmer directly entering a silo without any other precautions can be asphyxiated by the methane, knocked unconscious, and silently suffocate to death before anyone else knows what has happened. It is either necessary to leave the silo blower attached to the silo at all times to use it when necessary to ventilate the silo with fresh air, or to have a dedicated electric fan system to blow fresh air into the silo, before anyone attempts to enter it.

In the event that the unloader mechanism becomes plugged, the farmer must climb the silo and directly stand on the unloader, reaching into the blower spout to dig out the soft silage. After clearing a plug, the forage needs to be forked out into an even layer around the unloader so that the unloader does not immediately dig into the pile and plug itself again. All during this process the farmer is standing on or near a machine that could easily kill them in seconds if it were to accidentally start up. This could happen if someone in the barn were to unknowingly switch on the unloading mechanism while someone is in the silo working on the unloader.

Often, when unloading grain from an auger or other opening at the bottom of the silo, another worker will be atop the grain "walking it down", to ensure an even flow of grain out of the silo. Sometimes unstable pockets in the grain will collapse beneath the worker doing the walking; this is called grain entrapment as the worker can be completely sunk into the grain within seconds. Entrapment can also occur in moving grain, or when workers clear large clumps of grain that have become stuck on the side of the silo. This often results in death by suffocation.

=== Dry-material/bin hazards ===
There have also been many cases of bins and the associated ducts and buildings exploding. If the air inside becomes laden with finely granulated particles, such as grain dust, a spark can trigger a dust explosion powerful enough to blow a concrete silo and adjacent buildings apart, usually setting the adjacent grain and building on fire. Sparks are often caused by metal rubbing against metal ducts; or due to static electricity produced by dust moving along the ducts when extra dry.

The two main problems which will necessitate silo cleaning in bins are 'bridging' and 'rat-holing'. Bridging occurs when the material interlaces over the unloading mechanism at the base of the bins and blocks the flow of stored material by gravity into the unloading system. Rat-holing occurs when the material starts to adhere to the side of the bin. This will reduce the operating capacity of a bin as well as lead to cross-contamination of newer material with older material. There are a number of ways to clean a bin and many of these carry their own risks. However, since the early 1990s acoustic cleaners have become available. These are non-invasive, have minimum risk, and can offer a very cost-effective way to keep a small particle bin clean.

== Notable silos ==
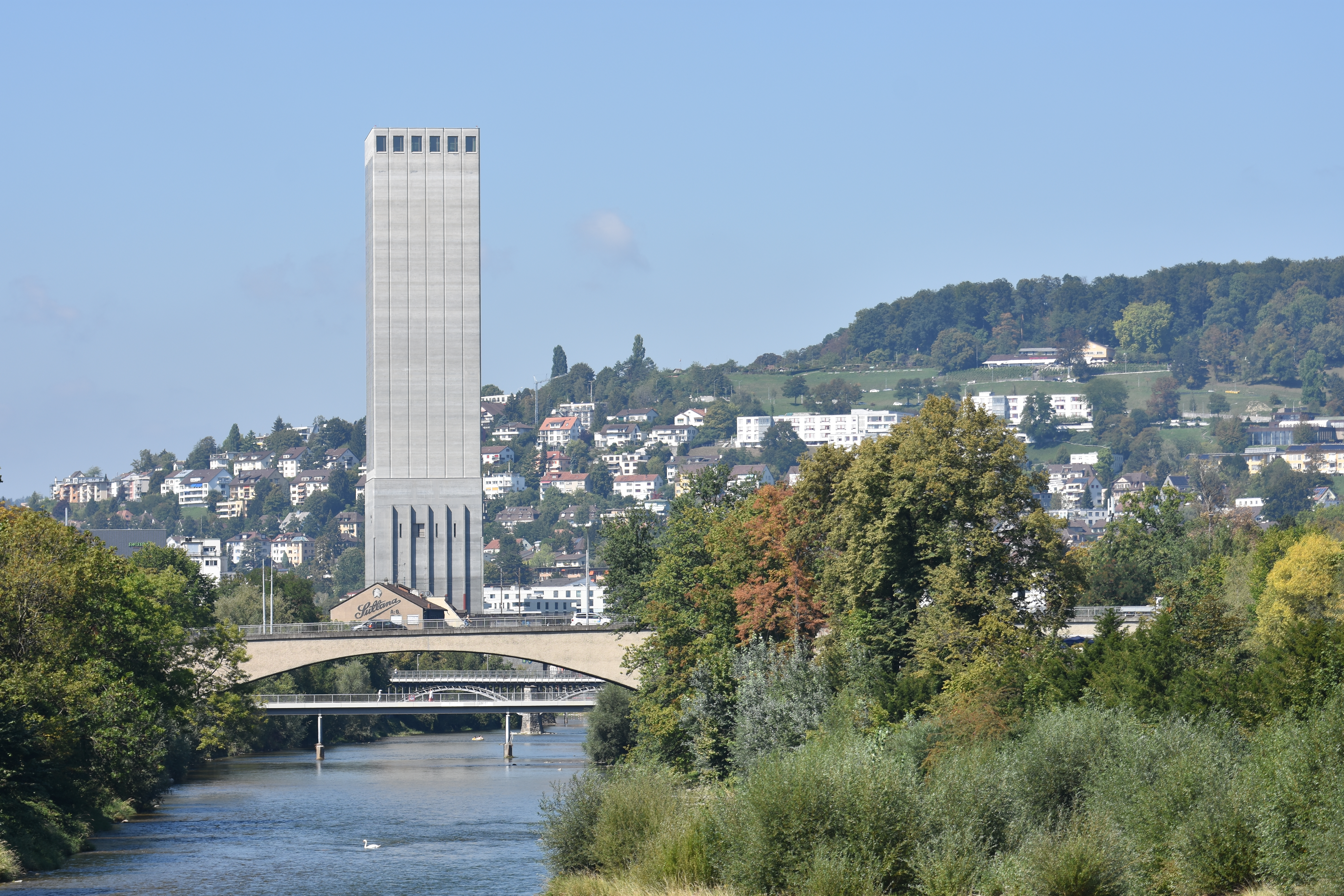
The Swissmill Tower in Zürich (Switzerland) is the world highest silo.

- Henninger Turm, Frankfurt, Germany, before demolition in 2013, had an observation deck and 2 revolving restaurants, height: 120 metres
- Swissmill Tower, Zürich, Switzerland, height: 118 metres, the world highest silo in activity.
- Schapfen-Mill-Tower, Ulm, Germany, height: 115 metres
- Silo Tower Basel, Basel, Switzerland, has an observation deck, height: 52 metres
- Quaker Square, Akron, Ohio, United States, is a former set of tower silos that is now a hotel, restaurants and shops
- Dagon, Haifa, Israel - transformed into a museum of agriculture, a prominent local feature.

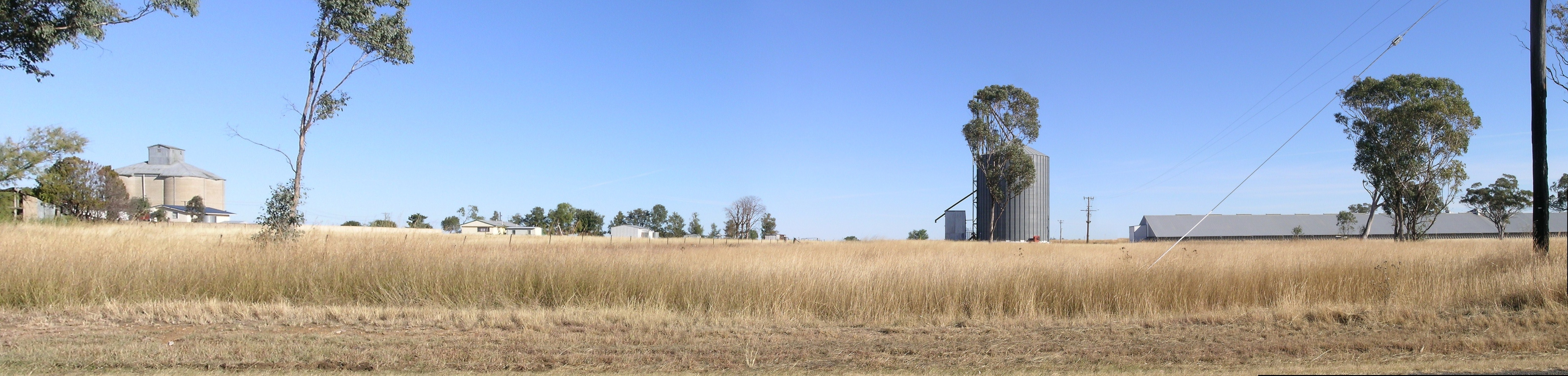
Three types of wheat bins, Delungra, New South Wales.

== Silo art ==
"Silo art" is a recent and distinctly Australian art movement involving silos being decorated with huge mural-type paintings covering a wide range of themes. The first silo to be decorated was in Northam, Western Australia in 2015. The number of examples increased rapidly: as of 2024, the Australian Silo Art Trail encompassed more than 60 sites. In 2017, the Yarriambiack Shire Council in Victoria sought to trademark the term "silo art trail". Grains handling company GrainCorp, which had supported 14 silo art projects, opposed the move, saying that the term should not "be owned by anyone, but [be] freely used by the community". IP Australia subsequently upheld the opposition.

Old water towers have also been decorated in many regional centres.

In Melbourne, a huge painting of New Zealand Prime Minister Jacinda Ardern embracing a Muslim woman, an image beamed around the world after the 2019 Christchurch mosque attacks, was painted on the 75-foot (23 m) Tinning Street silo in the suburb of Brunswick, after A$11,000 was raised in a day via crowdfunding.

The town of Monto in the North Burnett Region of Queensland has been put on the tourism map as the most northerly silo art installation in Australia. Its "Three Moons" silos depict several stories of the past, including the era of gold mining, cattle mustering and The Dreaming. It also has a mural on an old water tower.

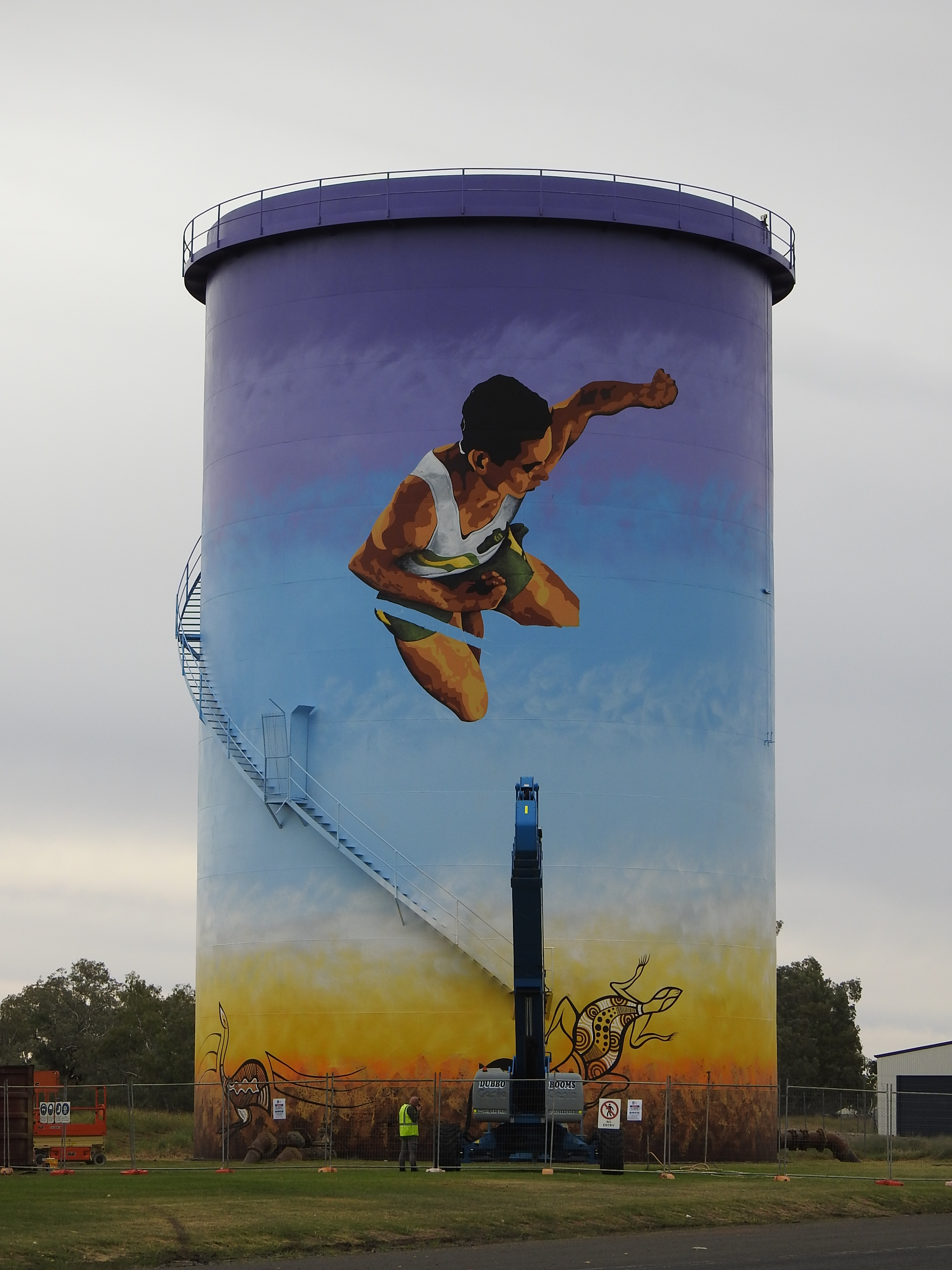
Percy Hobson Park water tower, Bourke, New South Wales, Australia (2021).

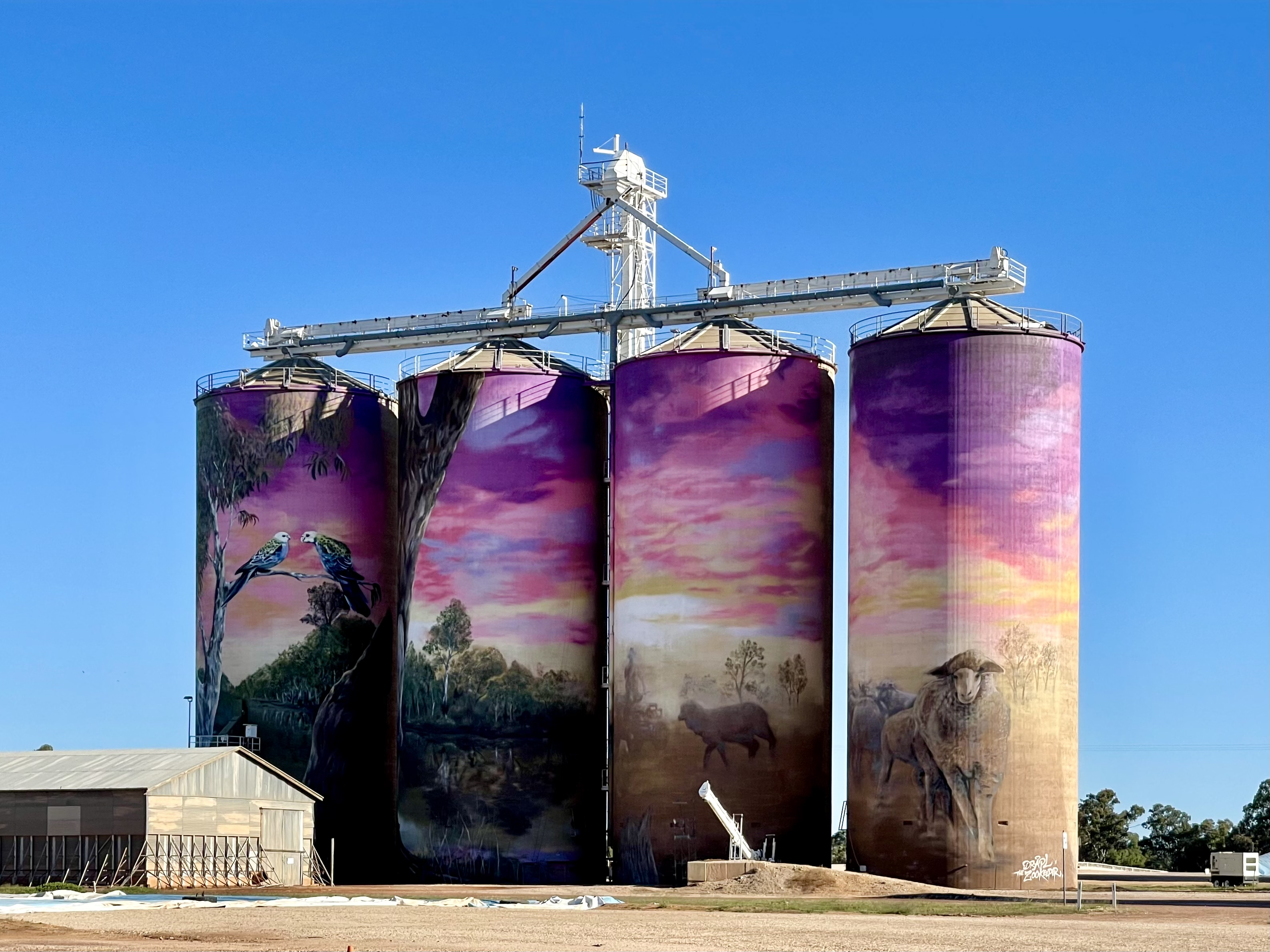
Thallon, Queensland, Australia (2021).

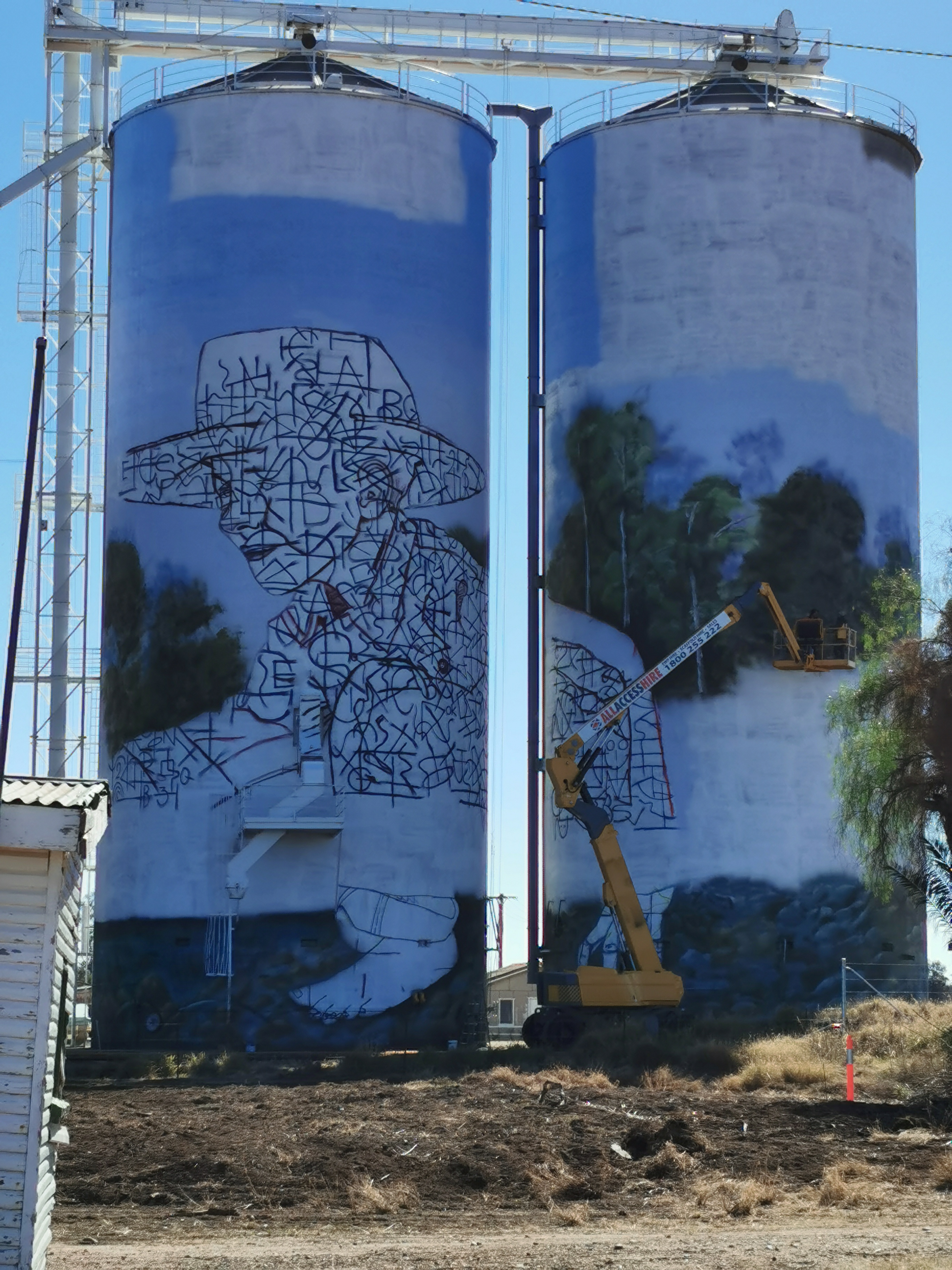
Yelarbon, Queensland, Australia (2019).

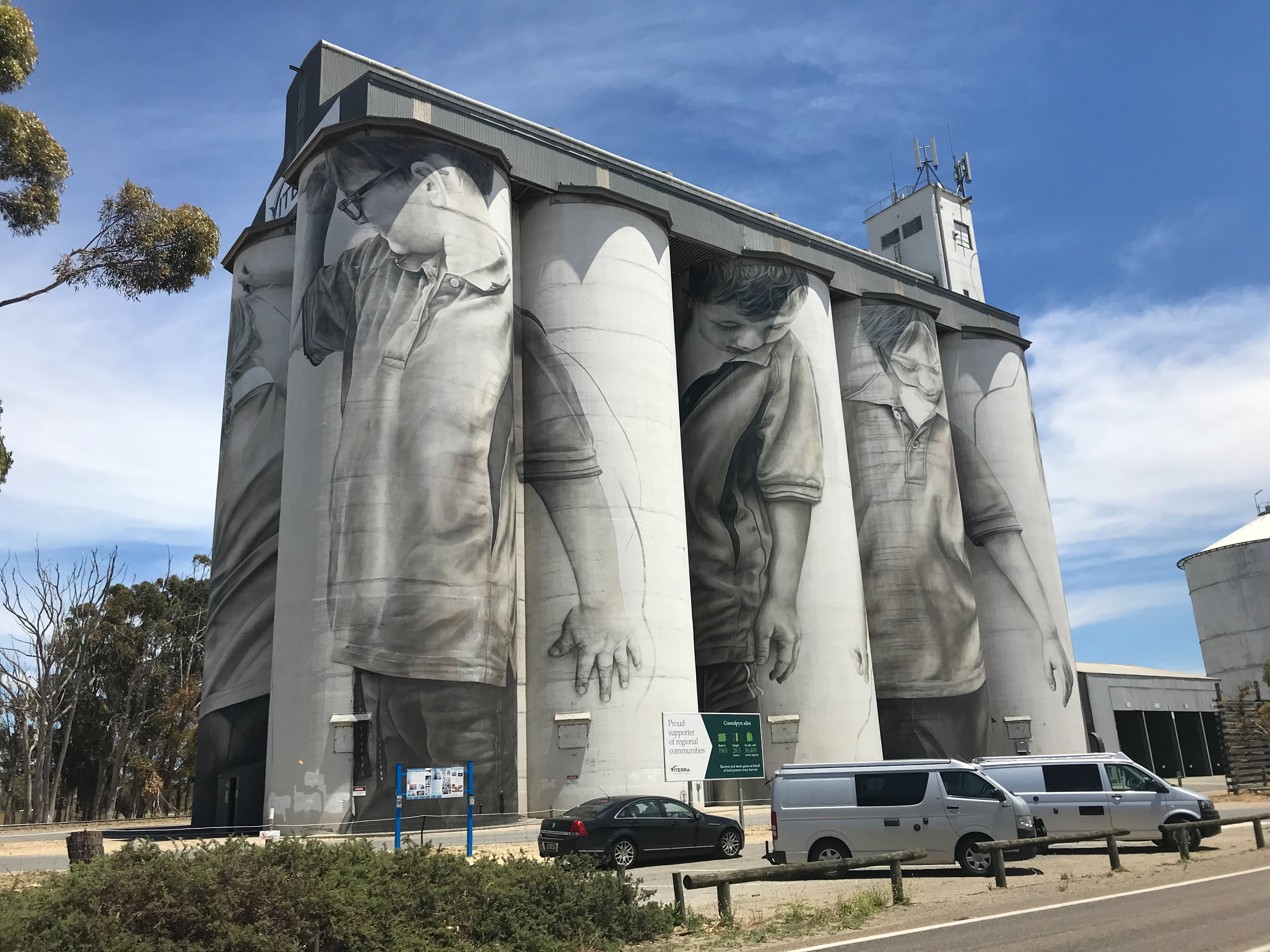
Coonalpyn, South Australia, Australia (2018).

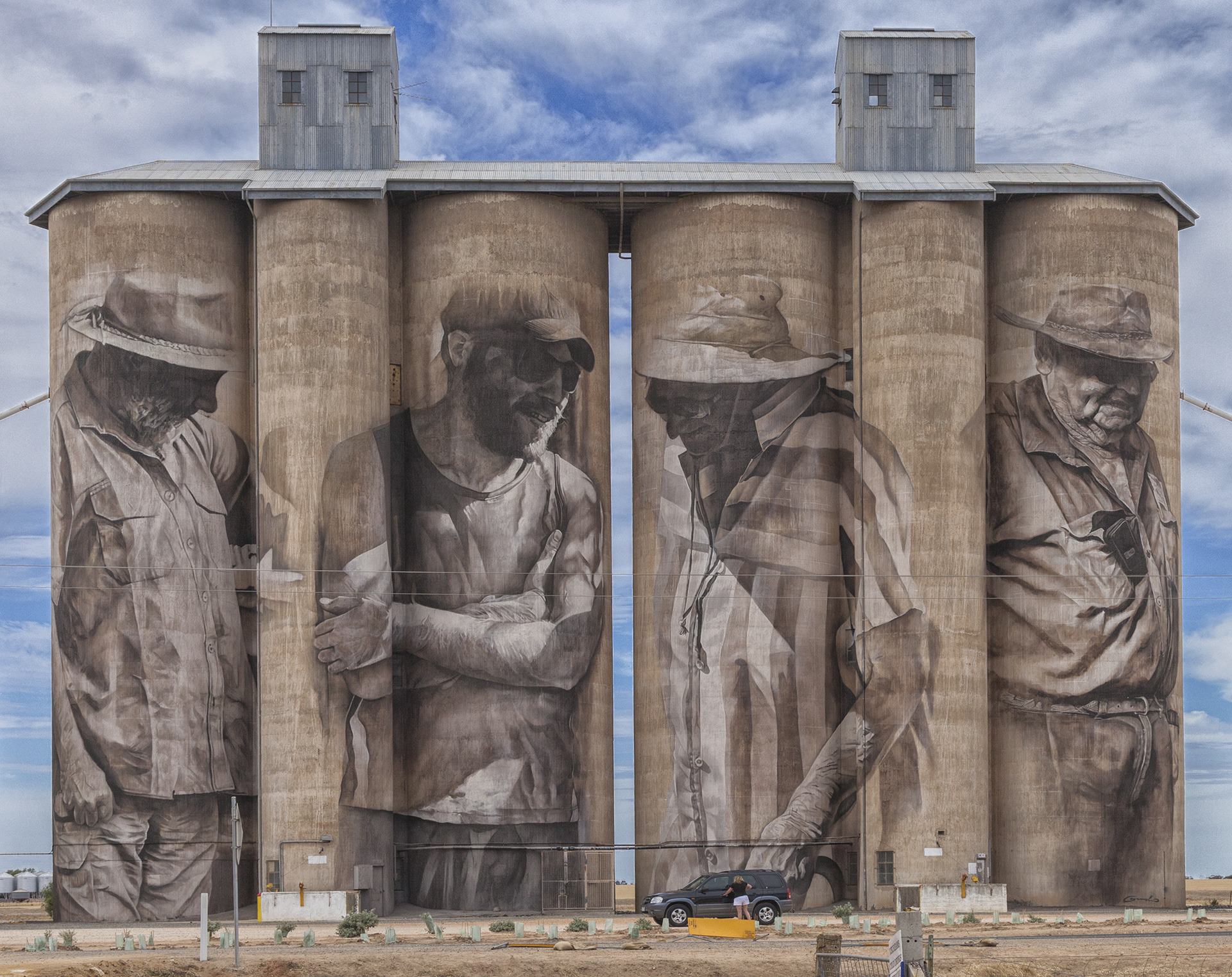
Brim, Victoria, Australia (2015).

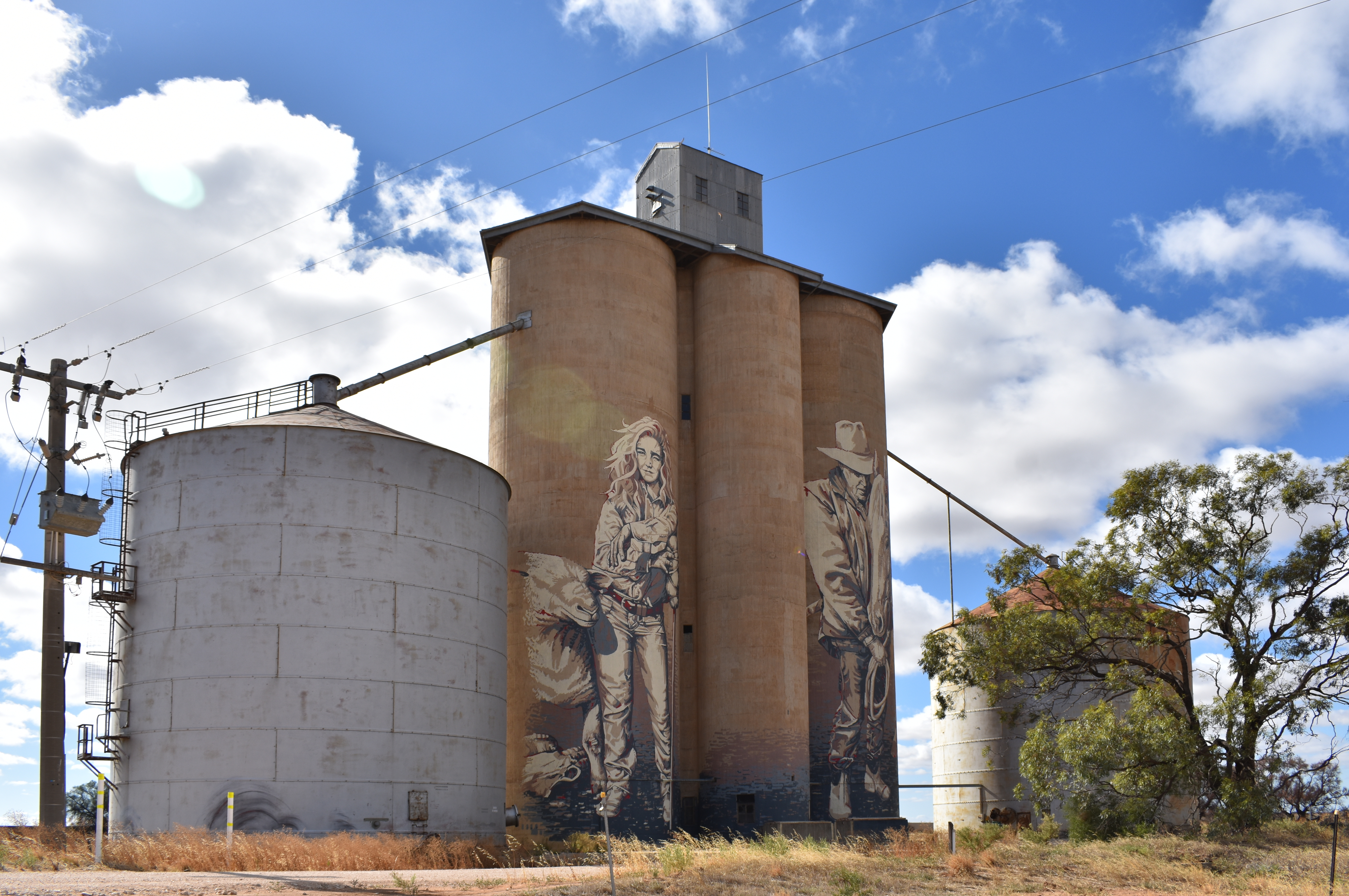
Rosebery, Victoria, Australia (2018).

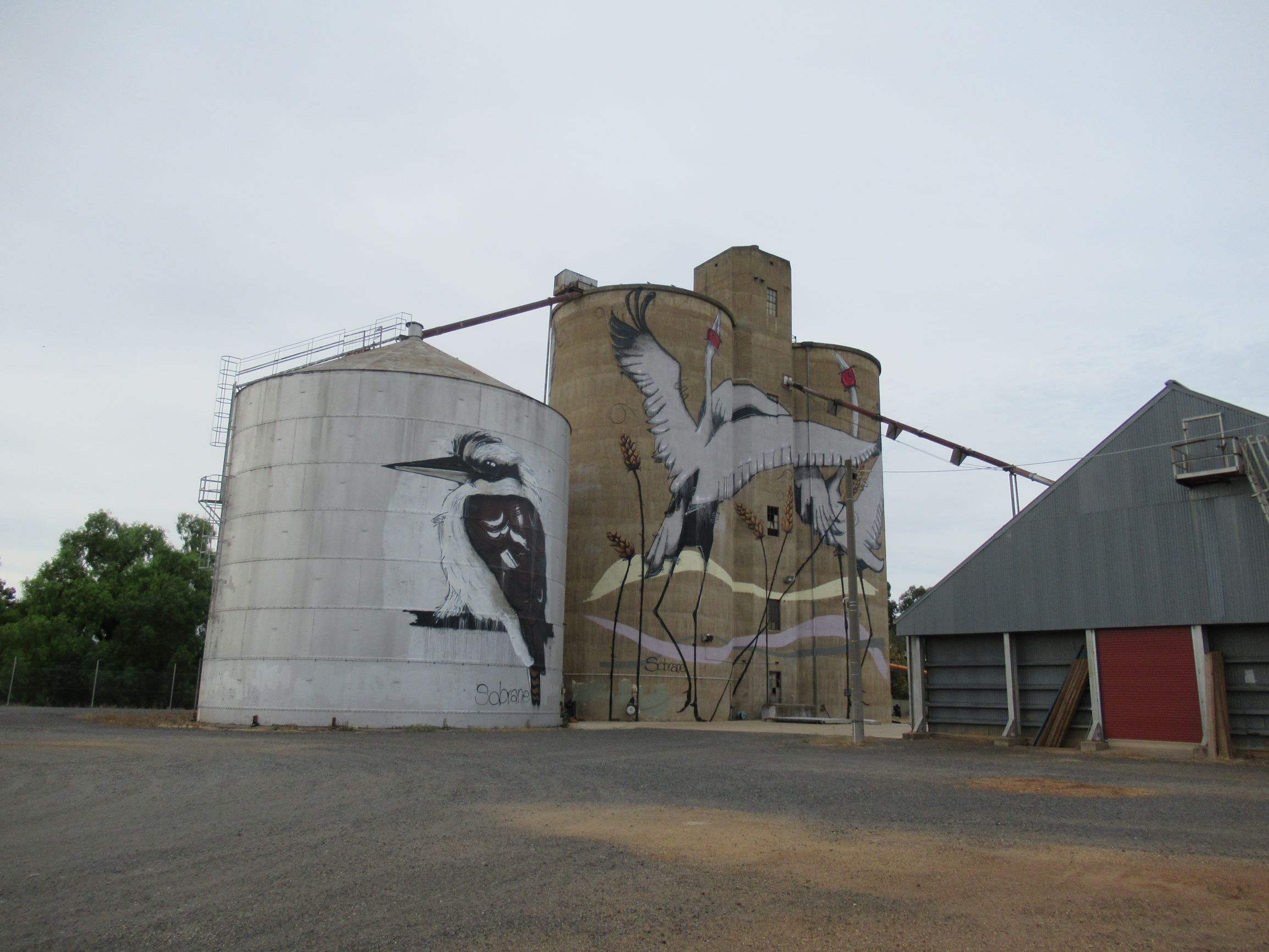
Tungamah, Victoria, Australia (2019).

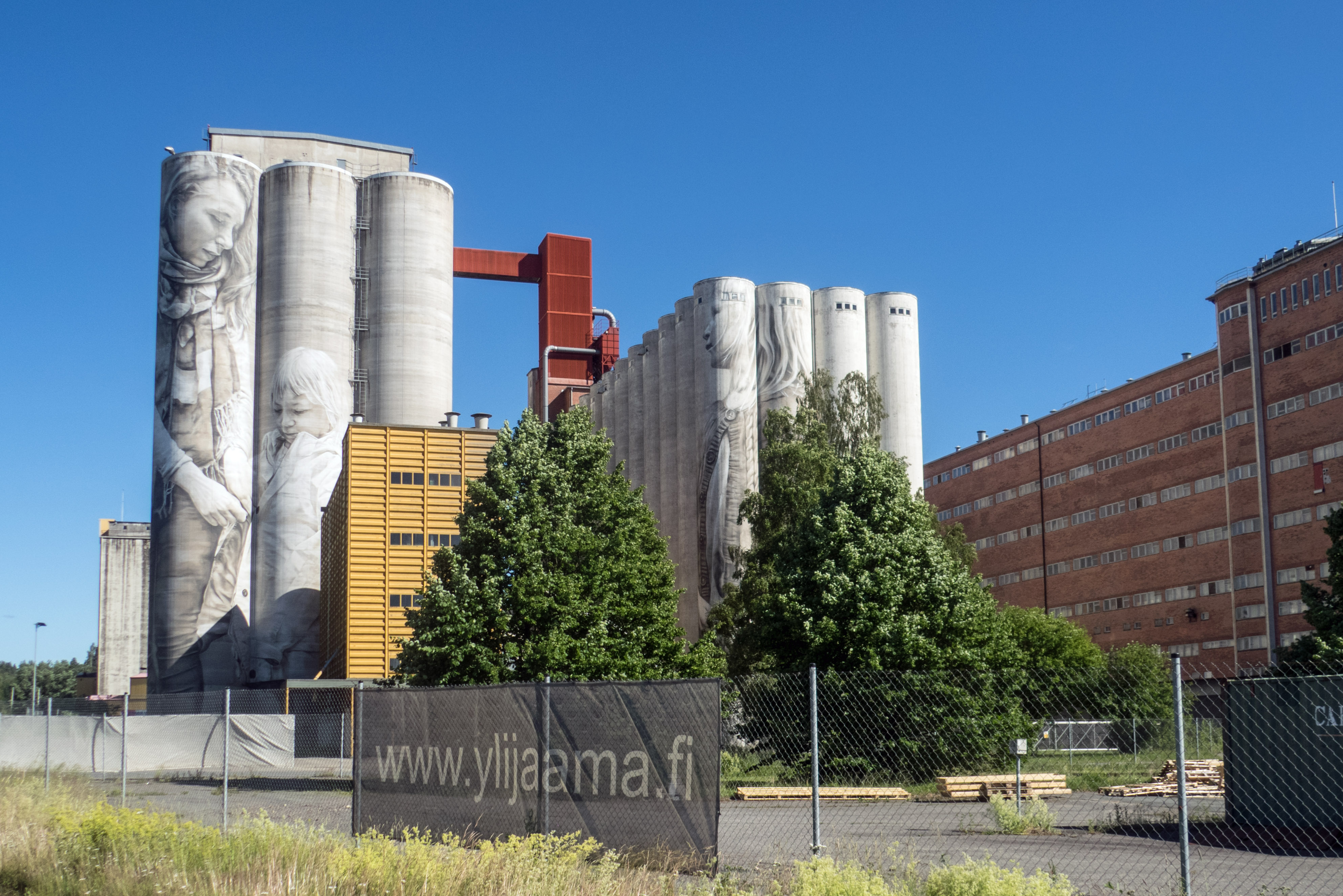
Kantola Biscuit Factory, Hämeenlinna, Finland (2019).

== Silo cleaning ==
Silo cleaning is a process to maximize the efficiency of storage silos that hold bulk powders or granules. In silos, material is fed through the top and removed from the bottom. Typical silo applications include animal feed, industrial powders, cement, and pharmaceuticals.

Free movement of stored materials, on a first-in, first-out basis, is essential in maximizing silo efficiency. The goal of silo efficiency is to ensure that the oldest material is used first and does not contaminate newer, fresher material. There are two major complications in silo efficiency: rat holing and bridging. Rat holing occurs when powders adhere to the sides of silos. Bridging occurs when material blocks at the silo base.

Manual cleaning is the simplest way to clean silos. This entails lowering a worker on a rope to free material inside the silo. Manual cleaning is dangerous due to the release of material and the possible presence of gases. In cases of bridging, an additional danger exists as the exit hole needs to be rodded from underneath, exposing the worker to falling powder.

Alternative cleaning methods include:

- Air blasters are a well-established cleaning method. Air cannons are expensive, however, as limited coverage requires purchase of multiple units. Air cannons are also noise intrusive and require high consumption of compressed air.
- Vibrators are easy to fit into empty silos, but can cause structural damage and contribute to powder compaction.
- Low friction linings are quiet, but expensive to install and prone to erosion which can then contaminate the environment or product.
- Inflatable pads and liners are easy to install in empty silos and can help side-wall buildup but have no effect on bridging. Inflatable pads and liners are also hard to maintain and can cause compaction.
- Fluidisation through a one-way membrane can help compacted material, but are expensive and difficult to install and maintain. These systems can also contribute to mechanical interlocking and bridging.
- Acoustic cleaners are the latest and possibly safest way to clean silos as these systems are non-invasive and do not require silos to be emptied. Acoustic cleaning is also a preventative solution.
- Pneumatic or hydraulic whip machines are portable machines used to "cut" build up on the walls of silos while being remotely operated from outside of the vessel.
- Silo cleaning companies provide turn key silo cleaning services using several different kinds of methods (depending on the company).

== See also ==
- Granary
- Silos & Smokestacks National Heritage Area
- Grain Silo Products & Complete Grain Storage Solutions
