= Air blaster =

De-clogging device

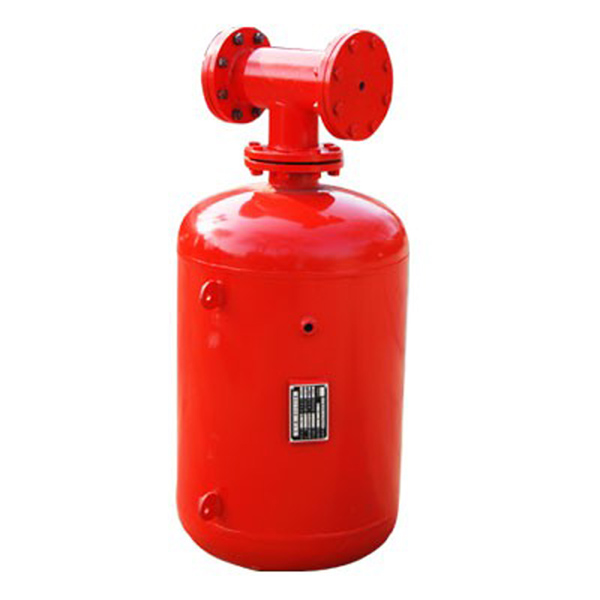
An air blaster

An air blaster or air cannon is a de-clogging device with two main components: a pressure vessel (storing air pressure) and a triggering mechanism (high speed release of compressed air). They are permanently installed on silos, bins and hoppers for powdery materials, and are used to prevent caking and to allow maximum storage capacity. They are also used in the film and theatre industries to project simulated debris from explosions, and as surprise effects in Halloween haunts and other attractions.

Air blasters do not need any specific air supply. Available plant air is enough with a minimum of 4 bar air pressure (60 psi or 400 kPa), although 5 to 6 bar are preferred for better results (75 to 90 psi). The average air consumption is moderate, and depends on the number of firings per hour, size of the pressure vessel, and number of blasters installed. For instance, a 50-liter air blaster consumes 0.60 normal cubic metres per hour at 6 bar air pressure (90 psi or 600 kPa), with 2 firings per hour.

When the air in the pressure vessel is quickly released, the blast, called the impact force, evacuates material sticking to the container's walls (referred to as "rat holing"), and breaks potential accumulation points for subsequent clogging ("bridging"). The blasts are usually programmed with an automatic sequencer.

== Operating principle ==
- Phase 1: Air feeding: Air supply from the air compressor passes through a 3/2 way solenoid valve feed, the Quick Release Valve (QRV), and reach the triggering mechanism with its piston disc in closed position. The air reservoir is then pressurized in less than 15 seconds, depending on the air pressure and air volume used.
- Phase 2: Waiting: An air pressure equilibrium between air circuit, triggering mechanism, and pressure vessel is created.
- Phase 3: Blasting: When activated, a solenoid valve purges the air circuit, thus creating an air vacuum. Then, the piston inside triggering mechanism is abruptly pushed back by negative pressure, thus creating a sudden blast from the air contained in the pressure vessel. This phase is measured in milliseconds.
- Then the cycle repeats again at Phase 1.

== Design criteria and construction ==
An efficient air blaster should be designed to ensure:

- Complete safety for the operators, thus avoiding harsh rodding or other manual cleaning methods;
- A sturdy design, able to cope with the most severe operating conditions;
- Easy maintenance, due to an easily accessible triggering device;
- A metal-to-metal construction design, making the air blaster extremely reliable even in harsh environment (such as exposed to heat and/or dust);
- A cost effective solution to all customers that prevents hopper, bin, and silo discharge interruption, as well as process disr

== Construction ==
Usually 2 versions exist A high temperature version: mainly for heat exchanger and cooler applications to remove clogging and to avoid costly plant stoppages and downtime. A low temperature version: to eliminate build-up and dead stock for powdery and granular materials thus preventing caking and allowing optimization of storage capacity.

== Installation ==
Air blasters solves problem occurring in cement factories among other industries, with blockages occurring in preheater towers (Kiln inlet, Cyclones, riser ducts...etc.) and in grate coolers, thus providing substantial savings.

== Sources ==
https://www.martin-eng.com/ https://www.martin-eng.com/content/product_subcategory/491/air-cannons-products

- Staminair website
- https://www.standard-industrie.com/en/
- INWET website
