= Silo Tower Basel =

Coordinates: 47°35′01″N 7°35′24″E

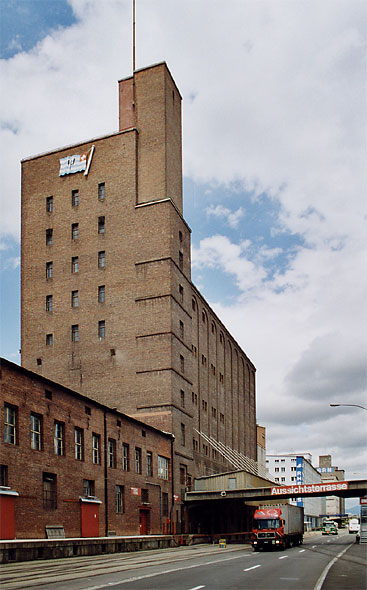

The Silo Tower of Basel is located in the Swiss city of Basel, in the Rhine harbour of Kleinhueningen, near the Dreiländereck. The silo tower was built in 1923 by a Swiss shipping company. Its viewing platform stands at a height of 52 metres (about 160 feet), which offers a view of the Rhine, the Rhine harbour, the city of Basel, and the Sundgauer hill country. In the distance, one may appreciate details in Germany and France. To this end, panoramic maps and telescopes are available to visitors.
