= Eurostat =

Statistics agency of the European Union

Coordinates: 49.633320°N 6.169780°E

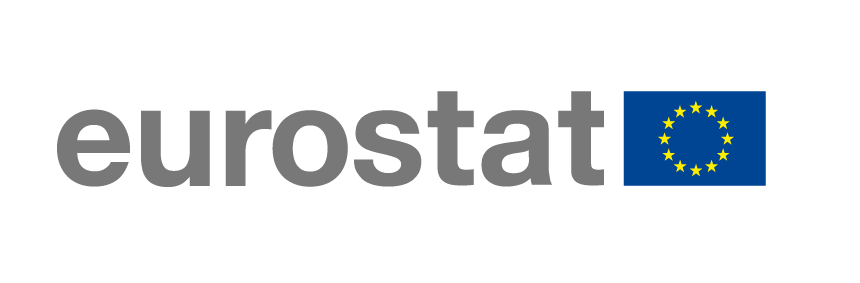

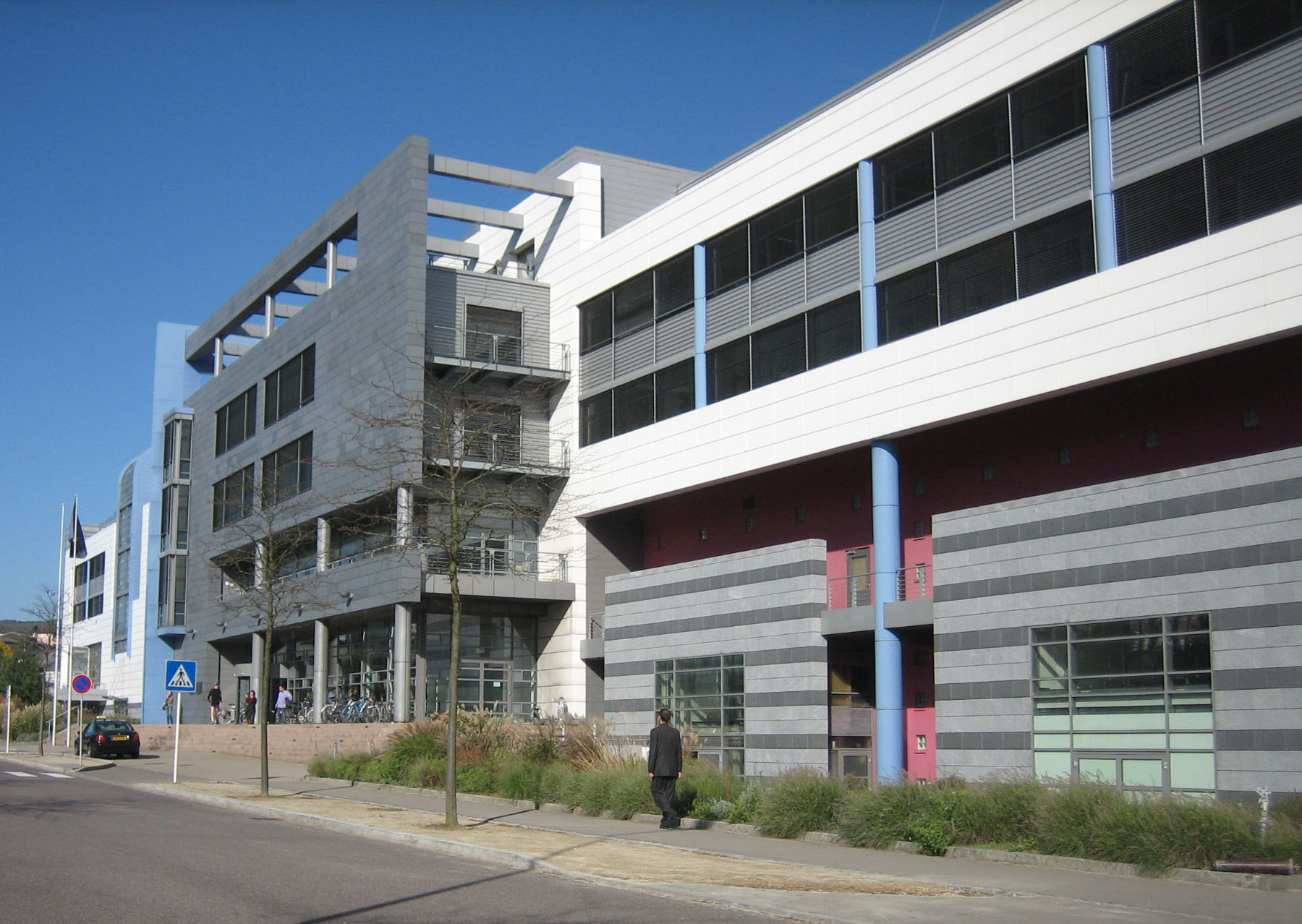

Directorate-General overview
- Type: Statistical office
- Headquarters: Kirchberg District Centre, Luxembourg City, Luxembourg
- Directorate-General executive: Mariana Kotzeva, (Director-General)
- Parent department: European Commission
- Website: ec.europa.eu/eurostat

Eurostat, or the European Statistical Office (also DG ESTAT), is a Directorate-General of the European Commission, based in Luxembourg City. Eurostat's main responsibilities are to provide statistical information to the institutions of the European Union (EU) and to promote the harmonisation of statistical methods across its member states and candidates for accession as well as European Free Trade Area countries.

The partnership of Eurostat and the national organisations that cooperate with it is referred to as the European Statistical System, a term enshrined in EU legislation since 2009.

== Name ==
Eurostat was originally established in 1952 as the Statistical Service of the High Authority of the European Coal and Steel Community, then upgraded in 1954 to Statistical Division of the HA-ECSC. It became the Statistical Office of the European Communities in June 1959, often referred to by its French acronym OSCE (for Office Statistique des Communautés Européennes). With the prospect of new member states making the handling of acronyms in multiple language increasingly onerous, the office decided in July 1972 to adopt the shorthand Eurostat in all its publications, with effect on 1 January 1973.

As the European Communities became the European Union on 1 November 1993, Eurostat's formal name became Statistical Office of the European Union. Since 1999, as all directorates-general of the European Commission were granted an abbreviated name, Eurostat has been referred to internally as DG ESTAT.

== History ==
=== 20th century ===
The need for a dedicated statistical capability was identified from the very start of the European Coal and Steel Community (ECSC). At its 14th meeting on 1 October 1952, the High Authority (HA-ECSC) decided to create a Statistical Service as one of its 12 initial divisions and services. By the end of 1952, the service had seven staff members including its head, German statistician Rolf Wagenführ.

On 20 May 1958, Walter Hallstein, the first president of the newly created Commission of the European Economic Community (CEEC), announced that a Statistical Office would be established to serve the three European executive bodies, namely the HA-ECSC, the Euratom Commission, and the CEEC. The Statistical Office of the European Communities (French acronym OSCE) was formally created on 11 June 1959 by joint decision of the three bodies and absorbed a separate statistical service that had been established in the meantime by Euratom in Brussels. The OSCE remained led from Luxembourg by Wagenführ as its Director-General, but over two-thirds of its expanding staff was located in Brussels, in various buildings with several relocations during the 1960s. Eventually, in 1968, after the three executive bodies had merged to form the Commission of the European Communities, Luxembourg became the location for most OSCE employees. An "outstation" of ca. 15 staff, however, remained in Brussels in the Charlemagne building until it was significantly downsized in 1980.

In 1968, the Statistical Office approved the initial version of the European System of Accounts (ESA), its core set of common standards for government financial and macroeconomic statistics. Given widely divergent prior practices, 1975 was the first year in which all member states reported using ESA, which underwent its first revision in 1979. Meanwhile in 1974, the first domain in the statistical database Cronos databank was installed, marking Eurostat's entry into the digital era. During the late 1970s and early 1980s, however, Eurostat was plagued by a mix of bureaucratic conflicts and the broader challenges of European integration in that period (eurosclerosis), compounded by an inadequate legal framework for the sharing of confidential data.

As with other aspects of European integration, the deterioration was largely reversed in the later 1980s under the Delors Commission. A Commission regulation of 19 June 1989 established the Statistical Programme Committee, streamlining the process of managing the increasingly numerous workstreams involving Eurostat together with the member states' respective national statistical institutes. At the same time, the status of the Statistical Programme was upgraded to a Council recommendation with dedicated budgetary resources. In 1990, a new regulation on transmission of confidential data to Eurostat removed the longstanding obstacle to joint statistical work. The Statistical Classification of Economic Activities in the European Community, known by its French acronym NACE (for nomenclature statistique des activités économiques), which had been adopted in 1969 to inform the OSCE's own work, was made compulsory in all member states by regulation adopted in October 1990. On 25 February 1991, the Council of the European Communities established the Committee on Monetary, Financial and Balance-of-Payments Statistics (CMFB), thus laying a framework for the hitherto largely nonexistent cooperation between National Central Banks and Eurostat in the preparation of Economic and Monetary Union (EMU).

The CMFB established a workable division of labor between Eurostat and the European Monetary Institute then the European Central Bank (ECB): the latter was responsible for banking and monetary statistics; balance-of-payments and financial-accounts data was a shared area; national accounts and the price index remained under Eurostat. A regulation to unify the measurement of inflation was adopted on 23 October 1995, establishing the Harmonised Index of Consumer Prices (HICP) as common reference. The establishment of EMU also gave unprecedented salience to the ESA as the basis for the calculation of the euro convergence criteria ("Maastricht criteria") and the Excessive Deficit Procedure under the Stability and Growth Pact. The ESA's legal status was upgraded to a Council Regulation, initially (EC) 2223/96 of 25 June 1996 known among statisticians as ESA-95, replacing the previous ESA version from 1979.

On 17 February 1997, the Council adopted regulation (EC) 322/97 known as the "Statistical Law", which further codified the member states' obligations, followed by a Commission decision of 21 April 1997 designating Eurostat as the sole Community authority entrusted with the production of statistics. European statisticians started to refer to the combination of Eurostat and national statistical institutes as a "European Statistical System", even though the statistical law of 1997 stopped short of granting that term official status. Later in 1997, the Treaty of Amsterdam (Article 213 A) included the first specific reference to statistics in the EU treaty framework. ESA-95 was first fully implemented by member states in 1999, in time for the introduction of the euro.

The dynamic expansion of Eurostat in the 1990s is reflected in the body's headcount, which, from just seven at the end of 1952, grew to 110 at end-1960, 220 at end-1970, 312 at end-1980, 388 at end-1990, and 639 at end-2000.

=== 21st century ===
Eurostat was rocked by controversy in 2003, as its use of temporary staff and outsourcing of some tasks to external organizations, which staff unions had questioned since at least 1996, came under scrutiny. In response, the Prodi Commission in May 2003 removed three senior Eurostat officials from their posts, including longstanding Director-General Yves Franchet, and a number of contracts with outside companies were cancelled. Eurostat appeared to have used a double accounting system to transfer money to bank accounts not monitored by auditors, and inflated the value of some contracts, with questionable spending amounting to around €5 million between 1996 and 2001. No evidence was found of personal enrichment, however, and the malpractice was described as a response to onerous EU internal processes, which former Commission president Jacques Santer suggested was ultimately a consequence of the member states' unwillingness to give the Commission adequate resources to execute its tasks. €1.2 million was recovered in 2001.

In 2004, controversy of a different nature erupted in Greece. Following a parliamentary election in March, a new center-right government under Kostas Karamanlis took over after 11 years of rule by the center-left PASOK party. The new government claimed that its predecessors had engaged in massive statistical fraud to facilitate Greece's adoption of the euro and the financing of the 2004 Summer Olympics in Athens, and produced a landmark financial audit exposing the extent of the malpractice. In response, the European Commission on 25 May 2005 issued a communication and recommendation on the independence, integrity and accountability of the national and Community statistical authorities, establishing a "Code of Practice on European Statistics", strengthening the audit capability of Eurostat to prevent a repeat of the Greek episode. A peer review exercise followed, lasting until 2008. The next year, Regulation 223/2009 revised the EU Statistical Law first enacted in 1997 and incorporated the Code of Practice into it, thus giving it force of law throughout the EU.

The effort to strengthen Eurostat, however, did not prevent an even broader Greek fiasco at the next change of government following the 2009 parliamentary election and the return to power of PASOK. Shortly after the election in October, new finance minister Giorgos Papakonstantinou revealed that the Karamanlis government, far from re-establishing sound Greek statistical processes, had dramatically underestimated its own government deficit figures. The revelations exposed an appalling lack of independence in the national statistical institute, the National Statistical Service of Greece, which Eurostat had been unable to mitigate. This triggered the Greek government-debt crisis, which in turn morphed into a much wider euro area crisis that was not resolved until the later 2010s.

Eurostat subsequently published a report to try to rectify its procedures. The European Commission proposes powers for Eurostat to audit the books of national governments. This led to the revision in 2011 of the European Statistics Code of Practice by the European Statistical System Committee.

ESA 2010, which had been in the works since 2002, replaced ESA-95 in 2013. It remains the reference framework to this day.

=== List of Directors-General ===
Name	Nationality	Term
Rolf Wagenführ	West Germany	1952–1966
Raymond Dumas	France	1966–1973
Jacques Mayer	France	1973–1977
Aage Dornonville de la Cour	Denmark	1977–1982
Pieter de Geus	Netherlands	1982–1984
Silvio Ronchetti	Italy	1984–1987
Yves Franchet	France	1987–2003
Michel Vanden Abeele	Belgium	2003–2004
Günther Hanreich	Austria	2004–2006
Hervé Carré	France	2006–2008
Walter Radermacher	Germany	2008–2016
Mariana Kotzeva (acting 2017–2018)	Bulgaria	2017–current

== Operations ==
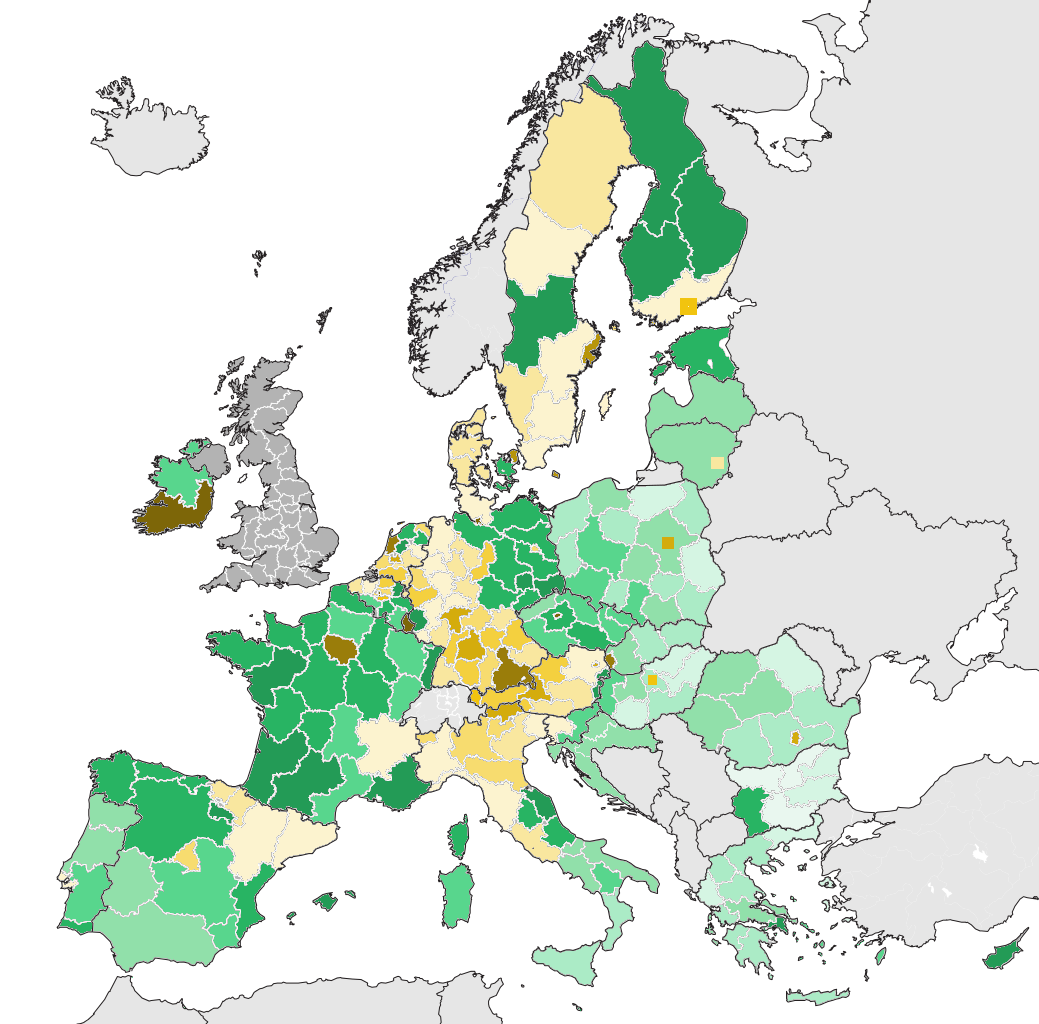
European regions by GDP, expressed as a percentage of the EU average

=== Organisation ===
Eurostat operates pursuant to Regulation (EC) No 223/2009. Since the swearing in of the von der Leyen Commission in December 2019, Eurostat is allocated to the portfolio of the European Commissioner for the Economy, Paolo Gentiloni.

The Director-General of Eurostat is Mariana Kotzeva, former Deputy Director-General of Eurostat and President of the National Statistical Institute of Bulgaria.

=== Regulations ===
The Regulation (EC) No 223/2009 of 11 March 2009 on European statistics establishes the legal framework for the European statistics.

The amending Regulation (EU) 2015/759 of 29 April 2015 clarifies that heads of NSIs coordinate national level activities for European statistics and decide on processes, methods, standards and procedures of their respective statistics.

Previous Eurostat regulations were a Decision on Eurostat (2012/504/EU), and the earlier Decision on Eurostat (97/281/EC).

=== Statistical work ===
The Eurostat statistical work is structured into Themes and Sub-themes.

General and regional statistics

- Regions and cities
- Land cover/use statistics (LUCAS)
- International cooperation

Economy and finance

- National accounts (including GDP)
- ESA Input-Output tables
- European sector accounts
- Pensions in National Accounts
- Government finance and EDP
- Exchange and interest rates
- Harmonised Indices of Consumer Prices (HICP)
- Housing price statistics
- Purchasing Power Parities (PPPs)
- Balance of payments
- Economic globalisation

Population and social conditions

- Population: demography, population projections, census, asylum & migration
- Health
- Education and training
- Labour market (including Labour Force Survey (LFS))
- Income, social inclusion and living conditions
- Social protection
- Household Budget Surveys
- Youth
- Culture
- Sport
- Crime and criminal justice
- Quality of life indicators
- Equality (age, gender and disability)
- Skills related statistics

Industry, trade and services

- Structural business statistics
- Short-term business statistics
- Tourism
- Manufactured goods (Prodcom)

Agriculture and fisheries

- Agriculture
- Forestry
- Fisheries

International trade

- International trade in goods (Comext)
- International trade in services

Transport

Environment and energy

- Environment
- Energy
- Climate change

Science, technology, digital society

- Science, technology and innovation
- Digital economy and society

=== General statistical activities ===
General statistical activities related to the European Statistical system are:

- Coordination and governance of the European Statistical System
- Statistical methodological coordination and research
- Statistical quality and reporting

=== Geographical scope ===
EU data

Currently, and since Brexit on February the first 2020, Eurostat data are aggregated at the EU-27 level, known as EU-27. Before Brexit Eurostat data was aggregated at the EU-28 level, known as EU-28.

Since Brexit occurred on February the first 2020, data has to be computed for the EU-27 because by definition Brexit makes the UK a third country to the EU.

Nonetheless, to avoid confusion with the previous EU-27 group of 27 member states — which was used in the series of statistical data before the accession of member state number 28 — another name for the current EU 27 without the UK is defined as EU27_2019 in February 2019 and EU27_2020 since March 2020 according to Eurostat.

The name changed from EU27_2019 to EU27_2020 due to a British constitutional delay which resulted in Brexit being delivered in 2020 rather than the initially planned 2019.

The concept of the EU 28 has been used since 1 January 2014, also according to the Eurostat methodological manual on city statistics, 2017 edition.

Local data are also computed at the NUTS level.

Statistical cooperation in and around Europe

Eurostat is also engaged in cooperation with third countries through the European Statistical System, Enlargement Policy, and European Neighbourhood Policy.

In 2021, European Statistical System includes 4 EFTA countries, that is 3 EEA countries and Switzerland.

EU Enlargement Policy includes "candidate countries" in the process of joining the EU and other potential candidates.

In 2021, European Neighbourhood Policy covers 16 countries such as 6 ENP-East countries — Armenia, Azerbaijan, Belarus, Georgia, Moldova and Ukraine — and 10 ENP-South countries — Algeria, Egypt, Israel, Jordan, Lebanon, Libya, Morocco, Palestine, Syria and Tunisia.

The trade and cooperation agreement between the European Union and the United Kingdom — since 1 January 2021 — includes a provision on statistical cooperation that foresees the establishment of a specific future arrangement.

== Access to Eurostat statistics ==
The most important statistics are made available via press releases. They are placed on the Eurostat website at 11:00 in the morning. This is also the time that the press release content may be distributed to the public by press agencies.

Eurostat disseminates its statistics free of charge via its Internet and its statistical databases that are accessible via the Internet. The statistics are hierarchically ordered in a navigation tree. Tables are distinguished from multi-dimensional datasets from which the statistics are extracted via an interactive tool.

In addition various printed publications are available either in electronic form free on the internet or in printed form via the EU Bookshop. Only larger publications are charged for as printed copies.

Since September 2009 Eurostat has pioneered a fully electronical way of publishing, Statistics Explained, like Wikipedia based on Mediawiki open source software and with a largely similar structure and navigation. Statistics Explained is not only a dissemination format, however, but also a wiki working platform for producing flagship publications like the Eurostat Yearbook.

Microdata, which in principle allows the identification of the statistical unit (e.g., a person in the labour force survey or a company for innovation statistics), is treated as strictly confidential. Under tight security procedures various anonymised datasets are provided to research institutions for validated research projects.

== Locations ==
Initially located with the rest of the High Authority's staff on Place de Metz, the Statistical Service moved in 1953 to a separate office building in the Ville Haute at 29, rue Aldringen. In 1958, with its headcount having grown to more than 40 employees, the Statistical Division relocated to the former Hotel Staar near Luxembourg railway station.

In 1968, with the relocation of many staff from Brussels, the Statistical Office moved again, while the derelict Staar hotel building was purchased by the Banque et Caisse d'Épargne de l'État and subsequently demolished. The staff previously in the Staar building moved to the newly erected Tower Building in the Kirchberg neighborhood, while those previously in Brussels went to the previous building on rue Aldringen and the nearby building across rue Louvigny, above the then-branch of Banque Internationale à Luxembourg (later Dexia). All teams were then brought together in 1976-1977 into the Jean Monnet Building, erected in Kirchberg by the Luxembourg government for the Commission.

Between September 1998 and February 1999, all Eurostat staff, which in the meantime had been again spread among several location in addition to the Monnet building, moved into the Kirchberg District Centre complex in the northeast of the Kirchberg neighborhood, where the office space is known formally as the Joseph Bech Building. Meanwhile, the Monnet building had become obsolete and was eventually demolished in the late 2010s, to be replaced by the Jean Monnet 2 building. It is planned that Eurostat will move into that building when ready, a move initially scheduled for 2023 but subsequently delayed.

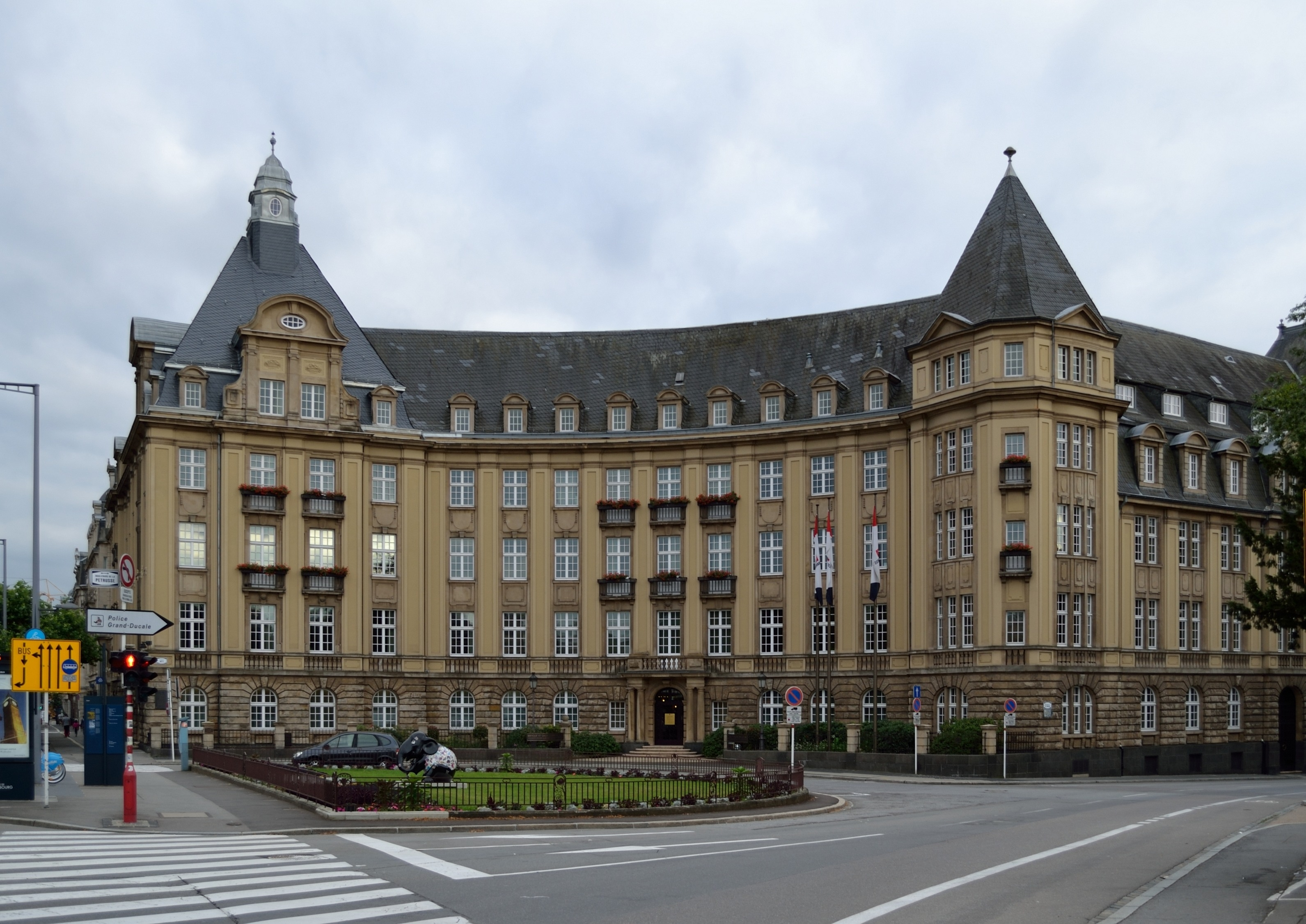
Former High Authority building on place de Metz, where the ECSC statistical service was originally established in 1952

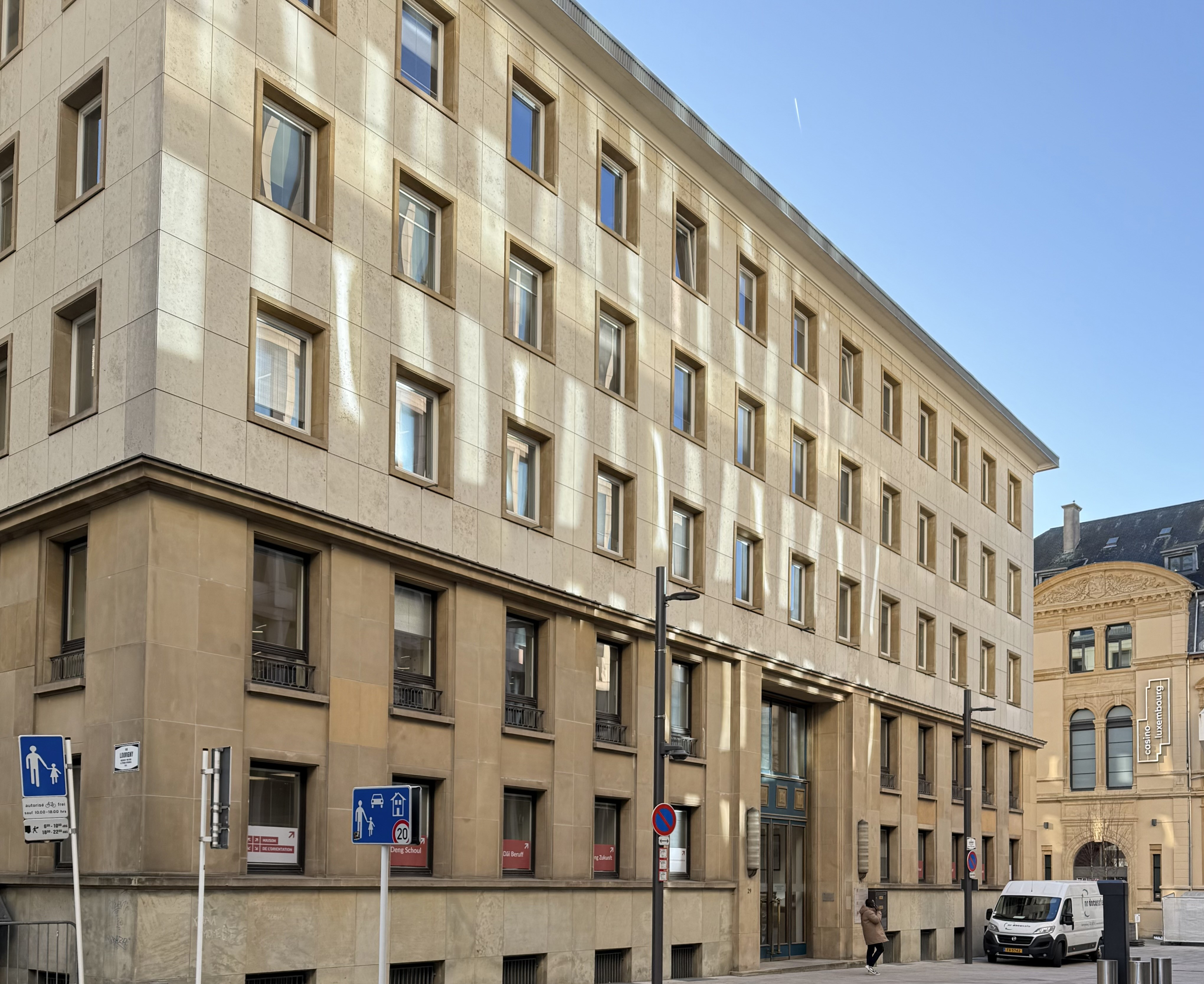
ECSC building in the Ville Haute (left), home of the ECSC statistical service / division 1953-1958 and later of some teams relocated from Brussels in 1968

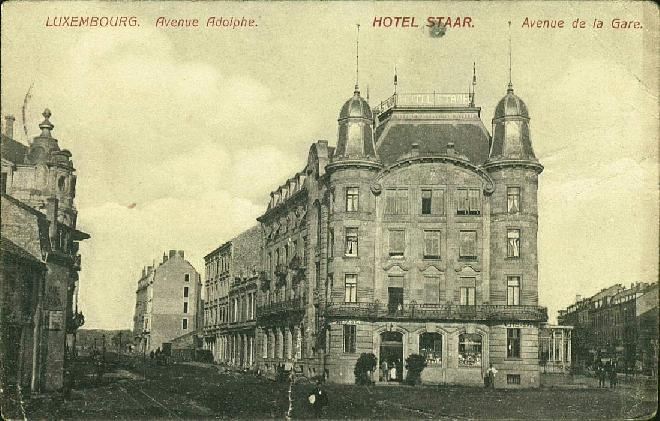
Hotel Staar building (photographed ca. 1907), the Statistical Office's Luxembourg home from 1958 to 1968, later demolished

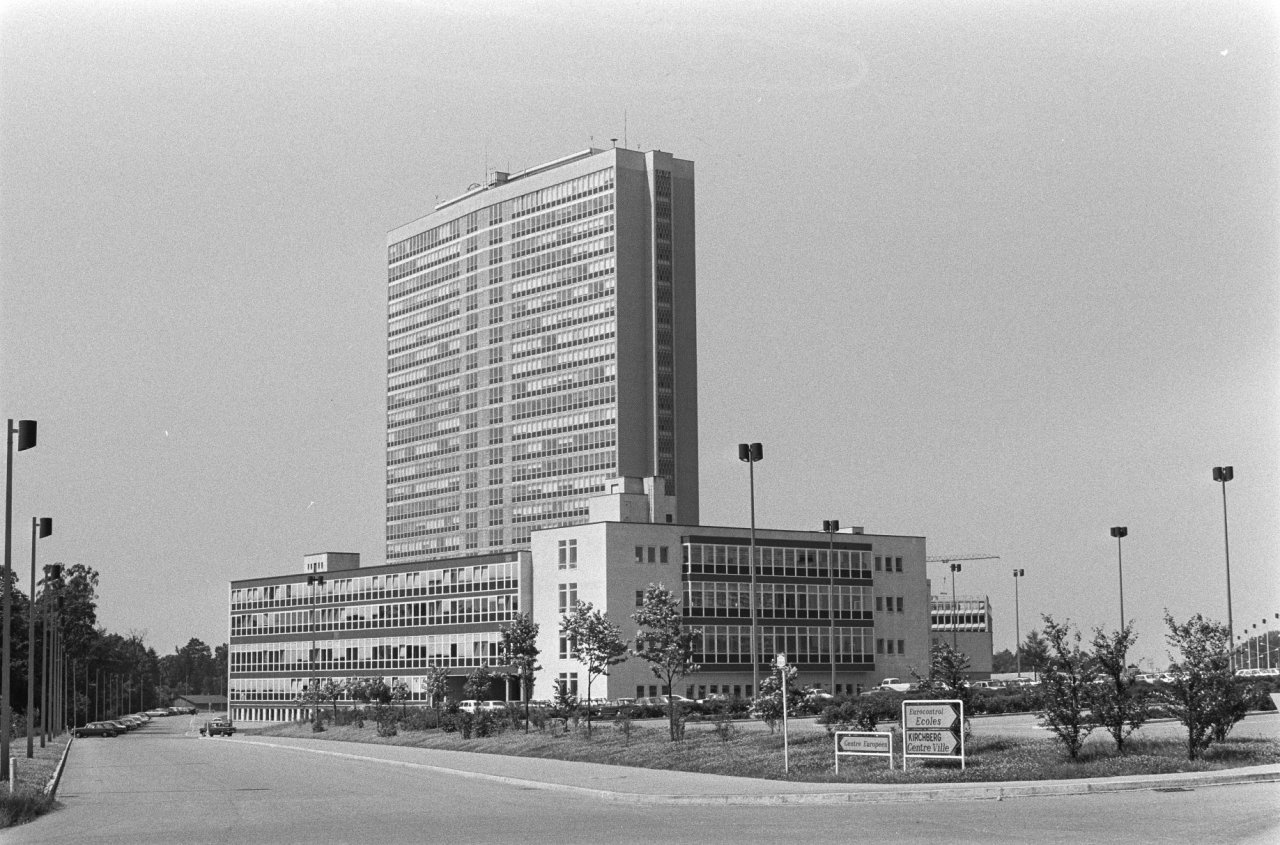
Alcide De Gasperi building, home of the Statistical Office's leadership and other services from 1968 to 1976 (photographed in 1971)

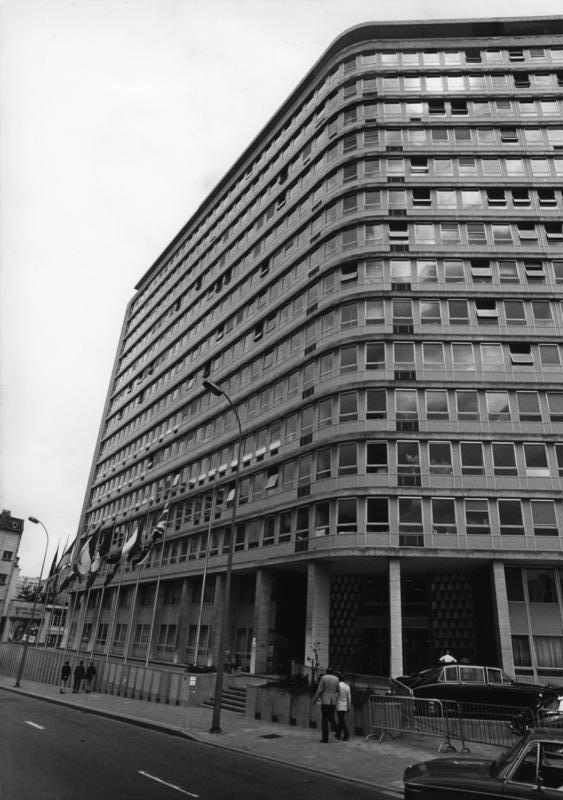
Charlemagne Building (photographed in 1975), home of the Statistical Office's "outstation" in Brussels from 1968 to 1980

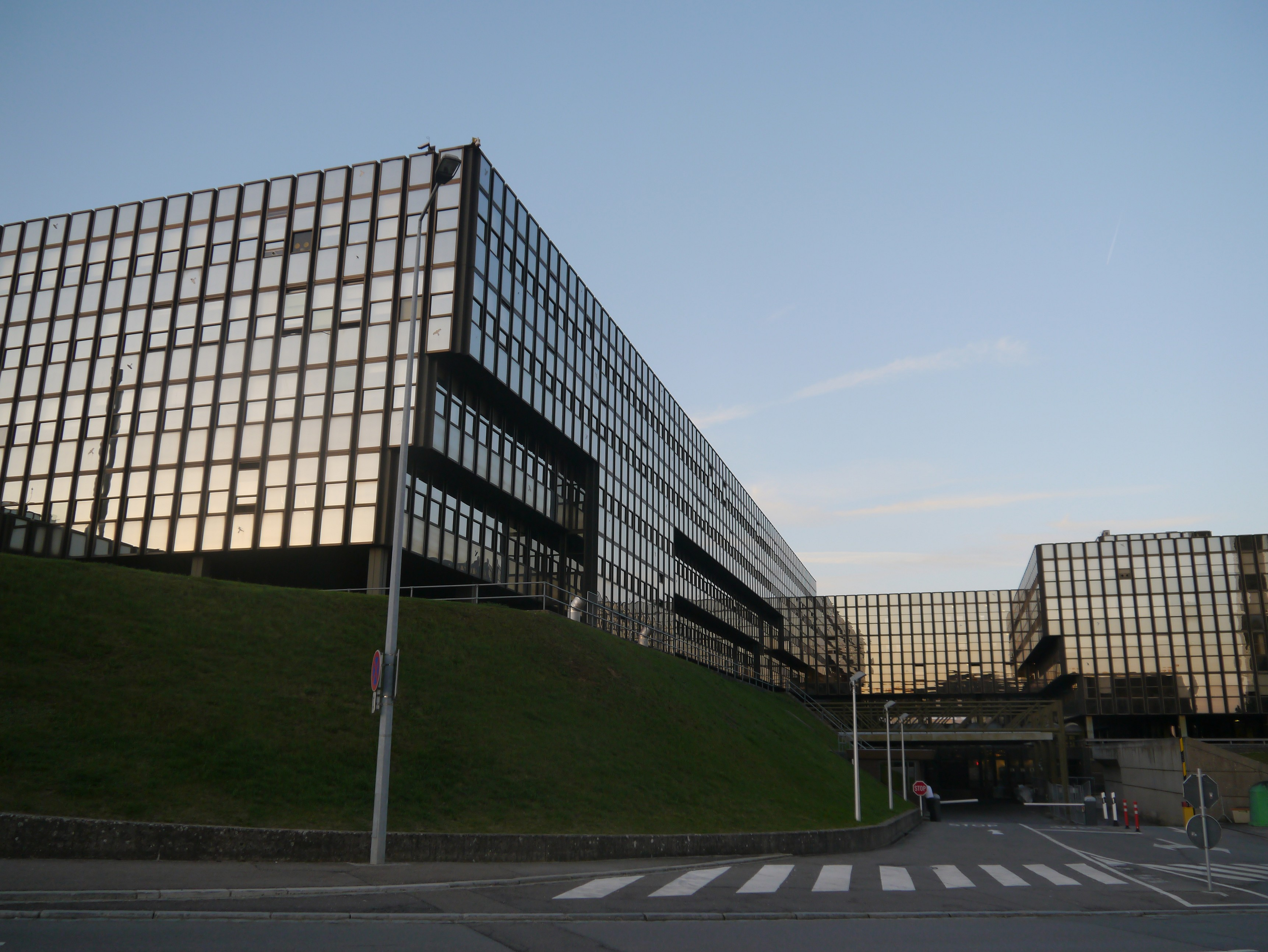
Jean Monnet building, home of Eurostat from 1977 to 1998 (photographed in 2012 before demolition)

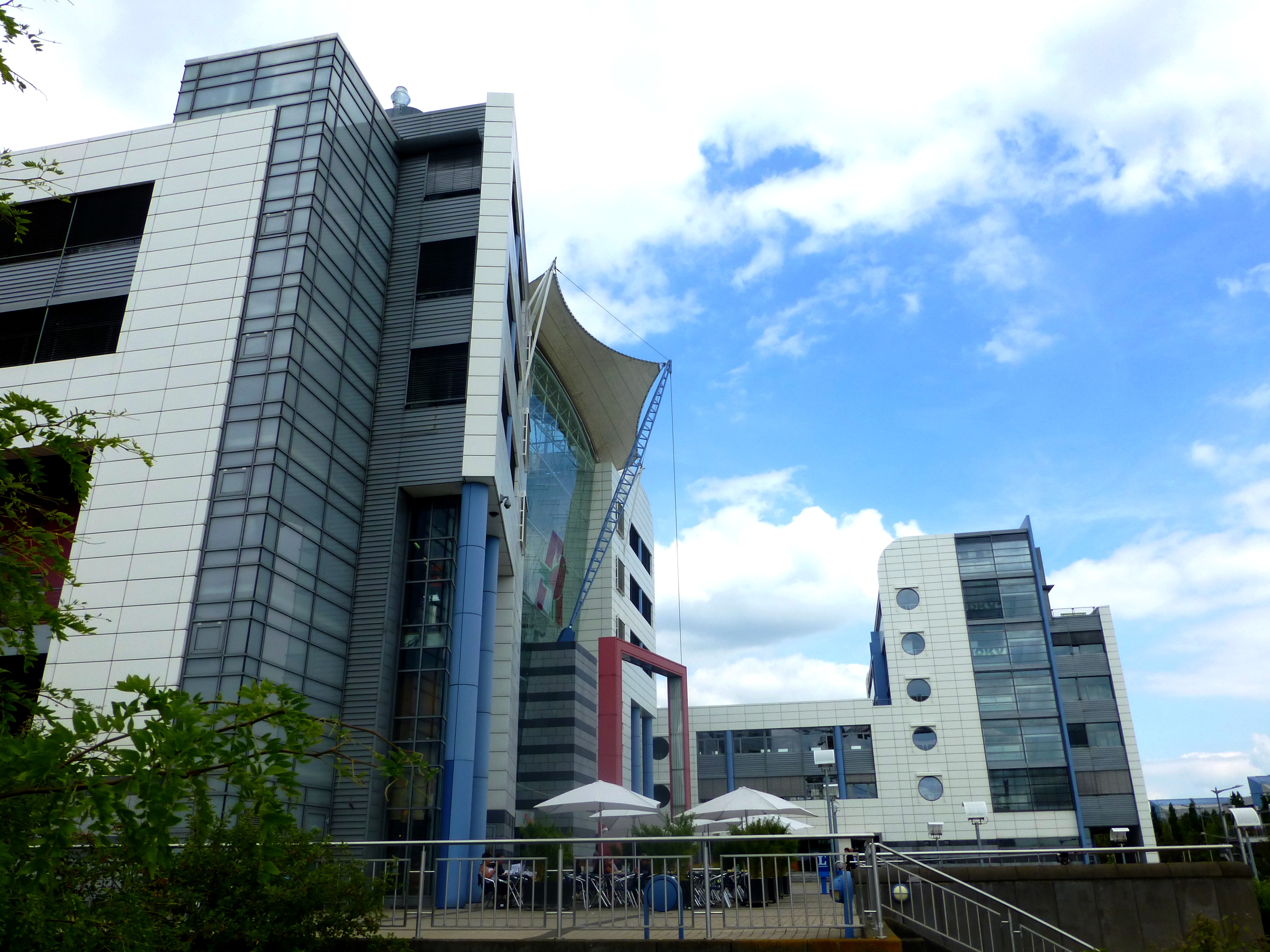
The Kirchberg District Centre, where Eurostat has been located since 1998 above the Kirchberg Shopping Mall

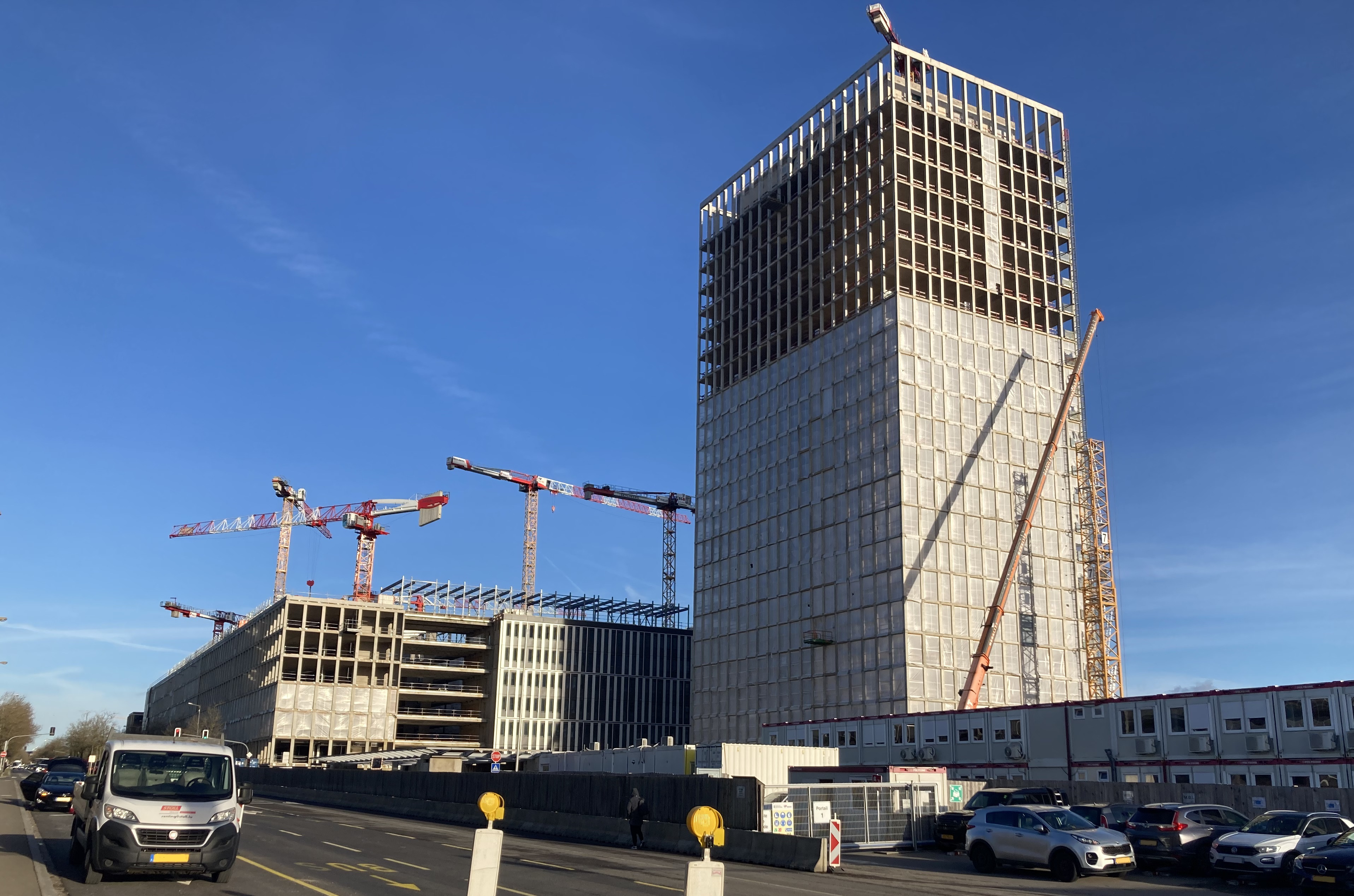
Jean Monnet 2 building, under construction in 2024

== See also ==
- European Commissioner for Economy
- EU Open Data Portal
- Eurobarometer
