= Euroforum building =

- Interactive map of the Euroforum building area
- Alternative names: EUFO

General information
- Type: Government offices
- Location: 10, rue Robert Stumper, Gasperich, Luxembourg City, Luxembourg
- Coordinates: 49.582650°N 6.117270°E
- Current tenants: European Commission
- Completed: 1996
- Renovated: 2004 (Conversion of hotel to additional office space)
- Owner: Euroforum SA

Height
- Height: 17.59 m (estimated)

Technical details
- Floor count: 5 (above ground)
- Floor area: 30,285 m^{2} (total); 23,389 m^{2} (net)

Design and construction
- Architecture firm: Novotny Mähner & Associates

Other information
- Number of units: 434 offices

The Euroforum building (also known as EUFO) is an office complex used by the European Commission in Cloche d'Or, Gasperich, Luxembourg City, Luxembourg. It hosts, amongst other European Commission departments, the Euratom Supply Agency.

== History ==
In the early 1990s, following the codification of Luxembourg as joint seat of the European Commission with Brussels at the 1992 Edinburgh European Council, and due to staff increases created by the enlargements of the European Union (EU) and increased responsibilities of the institution, the European Commission began looking for additional premises in Luxembourg City. Since 1975, the European Commission's Luxembourg activities had been primarily based in the Jean Monnet building (Note: The original Jean Monnet building was demolished between 2016 and 2019 to make way for the Jean Monnet 2 building.) in the Luxembourg City district of Kirchberg, in the northeast of Luxembourg City. This location had been promoted by the Luxembourg government as a base for European institutions since the 1960s. Whilst the European Commission aimed to rent office space in the Kirchberg District Centre, (Note: The Kirchberg District Centre's office space is formally referred to as the "Joseph Bech building".) a mixed-use development under construction in northeastern Kirchberg, this would not be ready until 1998, and was not projected to meet all its office space requirements. Additionally, the European Commission faced competition for land from other European institutions based in Kirchberg. Therefore, the European Commission decided to settle on the rental of additional property in the south of the city, in what was then the relatively undeveloped district of Gasperich.

Construction on the Euroforum building, designed by architectural firm Novotny Mähner & Associates, was completed in 1996, with the European Commission signing an agreement for the rental of office space within the building on 1 July 1995. Until 2004 other parts of the building were occupied by the "Inn-Side Hotel", after which, they were converted for use as additional office space by the European Commission, which, in March 2003, had signed a long-term lease contract with the owner, Euroforum SA. This included an option of purchasing.

The Euroforum building cemented Gasperich as the second "pole" — after Kirchberg — of the European Commission's activities in Luxembourg City, with the institution acquiring additional office space in the district, such as the Ariane and Drosbach buildings, since. However, following the completion of the Jean Monnet 2 building in Kirchberg, expected in 2024, the European Commission's Office of Infrastructure and Logistics expects to vacate all its current premises in Gasperich with the exception of the Euroforum building.

== Hosted departments ==
The Euroforum building has historically been used to host European Commission departments requiring a "very high protection level", including the Euratom Supply Agency — which ensures the regular and equitable supply of nuclear fuels to EU users. Other departments hosted within the building include the Directorate-General for Communications Networks, Content and Technology (DG CONNECT); the Directorate-General for Energy (DG ENER); the Directorate-General for Human Resources and Security (DG HR); and the Directorate-General for Mobility and Transport (DG MOVE).

== Specifications ==
The Euroforum building has a total area of 30,285 m^{2} and a net floor area of 23,389 m^{2}, with 5 above ground storeys and an estimated height of 17.59 m. It provides for 434 offices.

== Location ==
The Eurofoum building is located at 10, rue Robert Stumper in Cloche d'Or, Gasperich, Luxembourg City, Luxembourg.

== Transport ==
Trams services running on Boulvard de Kockelsheuer will be available a short distance to the southeast of the office complex from "Ban de Gasperich" tram stop following the expected completion of Luxembourg's new tramline in 2023. This will provide a direct public transport connection to the European Commission's predominant pole of activities in Kirchberg.

== See also ==
- Jean Monnet 2 building
- Joseph Bech building
