= Sots =

Sots or SOTS may refer to:

== People ==
- Viktor Sots (born 1958), Soviet weightlifter

== Places ==
- Lassouts (Occitan: Las Sots, Aveyron, Occitan, France; a commune

== Entertainment ==
- Slaughter of the Soul, an album by Swedish band At the Gates
- Sounds of the 60s, a BBC radio show
- Sound of the South Marching Band, the marching band at Troy University
- Sword of the Stars, a 4X videogame
- Sots art, Soviet pop art
- Signs of the Swarm, an American Deathcore band

== Government and politics ==
- State of the State address, a speech given by a state chief executive
- Special Operations Training School, of the Kenya Special Forces
- Sons of the South, a Lebanese Christian faction of the Lebanese Civil War

== Other uses ==
- Society for Old Testament Study, a professional body of scholars of the Hebrew Bible / Old Testament in the UK and Ireland
- Squawk on the Street, a financial television show on CNBC

== See also ==
- prince des sots, a Christmastide character
- Sot (disambiguation)
- STS (disambiguation)
- SOS (disambiguation)
- SS_(disambiguation)
