= National Statistical Institute (Bulgaria) =

Bulgaria's principal government institution in charge of statistics and census data

- Национален статистически институт

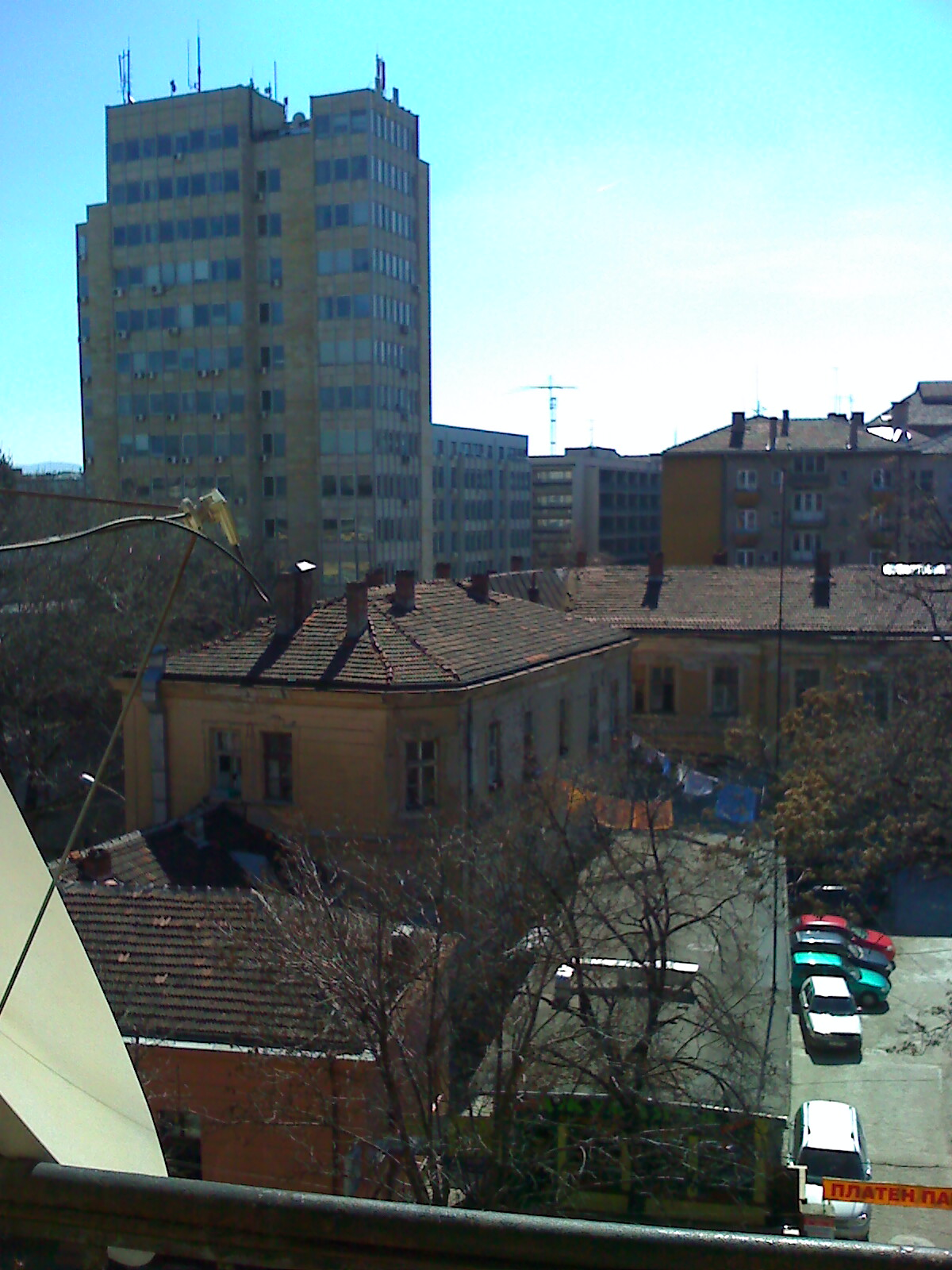
- Headquarters of the institute in Sofia

Government agency overview
- Formed: January 21, 1880; 146 years ago
- Jurisdiction: Government of Bulgaria
- Headquarters: Sofia, Bulgaria
- Government agency executive: Sergey Tsvetarsky, Bureau president
- Website: www.nsi.bg

The National Statistical Institute or NSI (Bulgarian: Национален статистически институт or НСИ) is the Bulgarian state agency responsible for the collection and dissemination of statistical data on the population, economy and environment of the country. It reports directly to the Prime Minister of the country. The National Statistical Institute was established in 1880 as a Department of the Ministry of Finance. It carried out the first census of the population in 1881. In 1894, the Department becomes part of the Ministry of Trade and Agriculture. In 1910, the agency published its first annual statistical report, "Statistical Yearbook of the Kingdom of Bulgaria".

== Historical Review ==
- 1880 A Statistical Division was established at the Ministry of Justice (21 January 1880 )
  - A Statistical Organizational Division was formed at the Ministry of Finance (June 25, 1880)
  - The beginning of the Population censuses in Principality of Bulgaria was established with the Law of 13 December 1880
- 1881 The first Population census was conducted on 1 January 1881
  - The Bulgarian Official Statistical Office was created. The Statistical Division turned into independent Statistical Office
- 1896 The first Census of the Civil Servants was conducted
- 1897 A Law on the Statistics Directorate in the Principality of Bulgaria and a Law on Population Census, Housing and Livestock
  - For the first time a Census of Land Property in Bulgaria was conducted
- 1907 A Law on the Statistics Directorate General in the Bulgarian Kingdom
- 1908 Issued a publication “Monthly Statistical Reviews “
- 1909 The first Census in Industry was carried out
- 1910 Published the first Statistical Yearbook
- 1925 Conducted the first Household Budgets Survey
- 1926 The first General Economic Census was conducted, together with the Population Census during the same year. For first time in Europe a sampling method for quick aggregation of the results from General Agricultural Farms Census was used
- 1929 The first specialized magazine of the Statistics Directorate General started. Nowadays it comes out under the name of “Statistics Journal”
- 1934 The agricultural survey was carried out with using a sample method for the first time in the data collection phase
- 1946 A Law on the Organization of Statistics in Bulgaria -The Statistics Directorate General passed over to the Council of Ministers. A network of local statistical bodies was created for the first time
- 1953 A Central Statistical Office at the Council of Ministers as a state authority to manage the overall statistical activity in the country was created
- 1991 A Law on Statistics – the National Statistical Institute (NSI) was created
- 1993 A Common Declaration of Statistical Cooperation between the National Statistical Institute of the Republic of Bulgaria and of the Statistical Office of the European Communities (Eurostat) was signed
- 1999 Worked out a Law on Statistics in compliance with EC legislation
- 2000 A Law on Population, Housing Fund and Agricultural Holdings Census in the Republic of Bulgaria - 2001
  - For the first time a Strategy for development of statistics till 2006 was worked out and adopted by the National Statistical Council
  - Closed the EU negotiations on Chapter 12 Statistics
- 2001 A Global assessment of the National Statistical System was carried out by the Eurostat
- 2003 Bulgaria officially joined the IMF Special Data Dissemination Standard
- 2006 A Law on Statistics of intra - community trade in goods
- 2007 The Bulgarian Statistics was integrated into the European Statistical System
  - A Peer review on the implementation of the European Statistics Code of Practice concerning improvement quality of statistical information and confidence in statistics
- 2008 A Strategy for Development of the National Statistical System of the Republic of Bulgaria, 2008 – 2012
  - The Law on Statistics was amended in compliance with the Regulation (EC) No 223/2009 of the European Parliament and of the Council of 11 March 2009 on European statistics
- 2009 Census Law on Population and Housing in the Republic of Bulgaria - 2011

== Management ==
- 1880-1884 Michael Sarafoff Head of Statistics Department from 1.08.1880 to 4.27.1884 year
- 1884-1886 Peter Kalinkov manager (director) of the Statistical Office of 1.08.1884 to 1.27.1886 year
- 1886-1893 Ivan Slavov, director of the Statistics Bureau of 6.02.1886 to 12.15.1893 year
- 1893-1899 Todor Ivanchov director of the Statistics Bureau of 12.23.1893 to 01.18.1899 years (from 1897 - Director of Statistics)
- 1899 Nicola Imaretski managing Directorate statistics from 01.18.1899 to 04.14.1899 year
- 1899 Raycho Karolev a.c. Director of statistics from 04.14.1899 to 7.09.1899 year
- 1899-1903 director Vassil Dyustabanov statistics from 7.09.1899 to 4.22.1903 year
- 1903 Kiril Popov managing Directorate statistics from 05.23.1903 to 2.07.1903 year
- 1903-1908 Vladimir Shishmanov a.c. Director of statistics from 2.07.1903 to 7.19.1908 year
- 1903-1908 Director Peter Germanov statistics from 07.19.1903 to 01.27.1908 year
- 1908-1927 Director Kiril Popov (then in 1910 Chief) statistics from 28.01.1908 to 6.05.1927 year in the period from 1.06.1917 to 1.21.1919 year GSK is managed by Nencho Mikhailov
- 1927-1931 Stefan Dimitrov managing the Directorate General of statistics from 7.05.1927 to 9.15.1931 year
- 1931-1933 Nencho Mikhailov Managing General Directorate of statistics from 15.09.1931 to 9.08.1933 year
- 1933-1934 Prokopi Kiranov chief of statistics from 9.08.1933 to June 1934
- 1934-1937 Slavcho Zagorov Chief statistics from June 1934 to 1937
- 1937-1943 Penko Vajarov a.c. Chief statistics from 1937 to the end of 1943
- 1944 Yani Grudev a.c. Chief statistics from early 1944 until 8.09.1944 year
- 1944-1946 Prokopi Kiranov chief of statistics from 9.09.1944 until the end of 1946
- 1947-1949 Kiril Lazarov Chief statistics from the beginning of 1947 to 8/20/1949 Year
- 1949-1950 Kiril Vladimirov a.c. Chief statistics from 20.08.1949 to 31.12.1950 year
- 1951-1952 Slav Georgiev Karaslavov deputy. PDK chairman and director of the statistics from 1.01.1951 to 6.10.1952 year
- 1952-1953 Rusi Rusev Penev Director General of statistics from 11.06.1952 to 1.02.1953 year
- 1953-1961 Evgeni Mateev chief of statistics, then chairman of the Central Statistical Office on 2.02.1953 by the end of 1961
- 1961-1971 Stefan Stanev chairman of the Central Statistical Office (then government information) by the end of 1961 to July 1971
- 1971-1976 Dano Balevski Head of the Central Statistical Office under the Ministry of Information and Communications from July 1971 to June 1976
- 1976-1977 Stefan Stanev Chairman of the Central Statistical Council (then the Committee for a unified system of social information) from June 1976 to November 1977
- 1977-1984 Dano Balevski Chairman of the ECCI from November 1977 to January 1984
- 1984-1987 Veselin Nikiforov chairman of the Committee on Essie from 01.11.1984 to 21.02.1986 year, Chairman of the Central Statistical Office (TSSU) to 01/26/1987 Year
- 1987-1991 Stanoi Tasev chairman of the Central Statistical Office (TSSU) from 01/26/1987 to 07/19/1991 year
- 1991-1998 Zachary Karanfilov Chairman of the National Statistical Institute (NSI) from 07.19.1991 to 05.20.1998 year
- 1998-2007 Alexander Hadjiiski Chairman of the National Statistical Institute (NSI) from 20.05.1998 to 27.04.2007 year
- 2007-2008 Stoyan Tsvetkov, Chairman of the National Statistical Institute (NSI) from 27.04.2007 to 25.01.2008 year
- 2008-2012 Mariana Kotzeva Chairman of the National Statistical Institute (NSI) from 25.01.2008 to 21.04.2012 year
- 2012-2014 Renetta Indjova Chairman of the National Statistical Institute (NSI) from 21.03.2012 to 04.25.2014 year
- 2014 Sergey Tsvetarsky Acting by 04.25.2014 and since 06.11.2014 years - Chairman of the National Statistical Institute.

== See also ==
- Demographics of Bulgaria
- List of national and international statistical services
