= Comext =

Statistical database by Eurostat

Comext is a statistical database on trade of goods managed by Eurostat, the Statistical Office of the European Commission. It is an important indicator of the performance of the European Union (EU) economy, because it focuses on the size and the evolution of imports and exports.

== Introduction ==
International Trade

Trade statistics follow the value and the quantity of goods exchanged between the Member States of the EU (intra-EU trade) and between the Member States and third countries (extra-EU exchanges) They constitute the official source of information on the imports, exports and the trade balance of the EU, its Member States and the euro zone.

Data

Statistics relating to the international trade represent an important source of data for many decision makers of the public and private sectors on national or international levels.

Examples :

1. Inform multilateral and bilateral negotiations within the framework of the common trade policy
2. Define and implement anti-dumping policy
3. Evaluate the progress of the Single Market or the integration of EU economies
4. Carry out market research by businesses and define their commercial strategy
5. Compile balance of payments statistics and national accounts

Data collection

Traditionally, customs records are the main source of statistical data on international trade. Following the adoption of the Single Market on 1993, customs formalities between Member States were removed, and so a new data collection system, Intrastat, was set up for intra-EU trade.

In the Intrastat system, intra-EU trade data are collected directly from trade operators, which send a monthly declaration to the relevant national statistical administration.

Information on extra-EU and intra-EU trade is collected monthly by Member States.

External trade data are subject to frequent revisions, as a consequence of errors, omissions or – particularly with the Intrastat system – late declarations by information providers. When data for the latest period are released, revised data for previous periods are also made available.

== Data ==
Eurostat publishes external trade statistics of Member States, Candidate Countries and EFTA countries. For each dataset the following basic information is available:

- reporter (country or geo-economic area like EU-27, EU-25 ... or euro area),
- reference period (annual or monthly),
- trade flows (import, export) and balance,
- product,
- partner country (EU Member States or third countries) or geo-economic area.

Aggregated data contain macro-economic indicators on both a monthly and annual basis (short-term and long-term indicators respectively). Trade flows are aggregated according to the product (main groups of SITC or BEC classification) and according to the partner (geo-economic areas).

Short term indicators include:

- gross and seasonally adjusted trade value (in million Euro),
- unit-value indices,
- gross and seasonally adjusted volume indices,
- growth rates of trade values and indices.

Long term indicators include:

- trade value (in billion Euro),
- shares by reporting country or by main trading partners,
- unit-value indices,
- volume indices.

Detailed data record the monthly and annual trade (imports and exports) for the European Union and the euro area as well as for each EU Member State and EFTA countries. Data are disseminated by single declaring country and by single partner, at the most detailed level of several product nomenclatures (CN, HS, SITC, BEC, CPA, and NST/R). Additional datasets provide supplementary information on EU trade by means of transport and on the tariff regime for Extra EU imports.

For detailed data the following indicators are disseminated:

- trade value (gross value in Euro),
- trade quantity in 100 kg,
- trade quantity in supplementary units (litres, square metres, quantity of objects...)

== Statistical Yearbook ==
The yearbook on external and intra-European Union trade provides data on long-term trends in the trade of the European Union and its Member States.

In particular, it contains annual statistics on the trade flows of the EU with its main trading partners on the one hand and between the Member States on the other. These statistics are broken down by major product groups.

The publication also includes extra chapters on the trade of candidate countries and EFTA members.

== Classifications ==
Combined Nomenclature (CN)

This classification has been used by the Community for all tariff and statistical purposes since 1988. The CN follows the structure of the harmonized system (HS), using the codes from the HS plus their subdivisions, making a total of more than 10 000 eight-digit headings. Prior to 1988, data were expressed using the NIMEXE classification of goods for external trade statistics. This covered some 10 000 products in 21 sections.

Standard International Trade Classification (SITC)

The United Nations Statistical Commission at its thirty-seventh session (March 2006) accepted a 4th Revision of it. It comprises 2 970 basing headings which are amalgamated into 262 groups, 67 divisions and 10 sections.

Standard goods classification transport statistics (NST/R)

in force since 1989, this classification comprises 99 chapters headings and 10 sections. You have the choice between goods containerised or not and the nationality of the transporters.

Data sources are collected by the statistical services of the States members (NSI's) and the statistical offices of the United Nations.

Système Harmonisé (SH)

Go to harmonized system to have an harmonized commodity description and see the Coding System (detailed sections).
