= STS =

STS, sts, Sts, or STs may refer to:

== Medicine ==
- Secondary traumatic stress, a condition which leads to a diminished ability to empathize
- Sequence-tagged site, a gene-reference in genomics
- Soft-tissue sarcoma
- Staurosporine, an antibiotic
- STS (gene), which codes for steroid sulfatase
- Superior temporal sulcus
- Sinus tarsi syndrome, a foot condition

== Places ==
- Semipalatinsk Test Site for Soviet nuclear weapons
- Staffordshire, county in England, Chapman code

== Transport ==
- Cadillac STS, a luxury car
- NASA Space Transportation System, the system in which the NASA shuttle is part of and only surviving component of; starting as a 1969 NASA proposal system for reusable space vehicles
  - NASA Space Shuttle program, the shuttle program itself, whose mission were referred to with STS-numbering
- Sail training ship, a ship prefix
- Satellite Transit System, now called the SEA Underground, airport transit in Seattle-Tacoma International Airport
- Ship-to-ship transfer, between seagoing ships
- Société de transport de Sherbrooke, a public bus system in Sherbrooke, Quebec, Canada
- Société de transport du Saguenay, a public bus system in Saguenay, Quebec, Canada
- STS Group (Dubai), a transportation company for private schools
- Sonar Technician Submarine, a US Navy rating
- STS, the IATA airport code for Charles M. Schulz - Sonoma County Airport
- STS, the National Rail code for Saltash railway station, Cornwall, UK

== Science and technology ==
- Scanning tunneling spectroscopy
- Science and technology studies, also known as science, technology, and society
- Sociotechnical system
- Space Tourism Society
- Special treatment steel, used by the US Navy c.1910
- Speeter–Anthony tryptamine synthesis, a synthetic route used to synthesize tryptamines
- Static transfer switch, a semiconductor switch
- STS 5 an Australopithecus specimen
- Suomenkielisten teknikkojen seura, now incorporated into Academic Engineers and Architects in Finland TEK

== Computing and communications ==
- HTTP Strict Transport Security
- Security token service, a web service
- Set Transmit State, hex 93 in the C1 set of control codes
- Spring Tool Suite, IDE for Spring Framework
- Station-to-Station protocol, a cryptographic key agreement scheme
- Synergy Teleconferencing System, a PC-based chat server
- Serviciul de Telecomunicații Speciale, the Romanian special telecommunication service
- STS Relay, US speech to speech relay service for people with a speech disability
- STS (TV channel), Russia
- Synchronous transport signal, in synchronous optical networking
- Saga Television Station, a television station in Saga Prefecture, Japan

== Culture ==
- Satanas (gang), a Filipino-American gang
- Stepover toehold sleeper, a wrestling hold
- S.T.S. (band), an Austropop band

== Societies, organizations and companies ==
- Scottish Tartans Society, a defunct Scottish society
- Sisu Terminal Systems, a former terminal tractor producer
- Society of the Holy Trinity (Societas Trinitatis Sanctae – STS), Lutheran ministerium
- Suomen Työväen Säästöpankki, a defunct Finnish commercial bank
- Hitachi Rail STS, formerly known as Ansaldo STS, a company specializing in railway signalling and control systems

== Other uses ==
- Saints, the plural of Saint, for example: Sts. Peter and Paul
- Short-term business statistics
- Strathcona-Tweedsmuir School, Alberta, Canada
- Susquehannock Trail System, Pennsylvania, US
- Science Talent Search, see Regeneron Science Talent Search, formerly Westinghouse Science Talent Search, Intel Science Talent Search
- Special Tactics Squadrons, United States Air Force units
