= Novotny Mähner Assoziierte =

Novotny Mähner Assoziierte (N+M, Novotny Mähner & Associates) is an architect company based in Offenbach am Main. It was founded by Fritz Novotny and Arthur Mähner. Their design is puristic and clear.

== History ==
In 2007, the Frankfurt-based N+M architects (formerly Novotny Mähner), specialists in high-rise buildings and the health sector, became an active member of the ATP Group. In 2009, the office of N+M architects was renamed in ATP N+M Architekten und Ingenieure GmbH. In 2014, the partnership with Frankfurt resulted in the creation of the health sector design company ATP health. In the same year, the office of ATP N+M Architekten und Ingenieure GmbH was renamed in ATP Frankfurt.

Many skyscrapers in Frankfurt were planned by the office as well as other structures worldwide.

== Skyscrapers ==
- Hochhaus Mercedesstraße
- Büro Center Nibelungenplatz, 1966
- Garden Towers, 1976
- Stern Plaza, 1992
- Trianon, 1993
- American Express (Frankfurt), 1993
- Taunus Tower, 1996
- Limes Haus I, 1996
- Eurotheum, 1998–2001
- Sunflower Tower Beijing 1999
- Gallileo, 2003
- City Tower, 2003

== Buildings ==
- Volksschule Großkrotzenburg (Kreis Offenbach), 1964
- Gesamtschule Königstein/Taunus, 1972
- Service Rechenzentrum der Dt. DATEL, Darmstadt, 1973
- Erich-Ollenhauer-House, Bonn (Headquarters of the SPD 1975–99), 1975
- German Embassy, Cairo 1978–79
- Chinese Embassy, Berlin/GDR
- Euroforum building, Luxembourg, 1996
- Hyatt Regency, Cologne, 1985–1988
- Friedrich-Ebert-Stiftung, Bonn
- Hospital in Merano, Italy „Franz Tappeiner“ (Ospedale di Merano), 1996
- MDR Hörfunkzentrale (Halle), 1998
- Friedrich-Ebert-Stiftung, Berlin, 1999
- Stilwerk (Berlin), 1999
- Humboldt Park Munich
- Lahnstraße 60–68, Frankfurt, 2001
- Deutsche Bank (Berlin), 2005
- Main Triangel, Frankfurt, 2006
