= Mariana Kotzeva =

Bulgarian statistician and econometrician

Mariana Mihaylova Kotzeva
- Мариана Михайлова Коцева
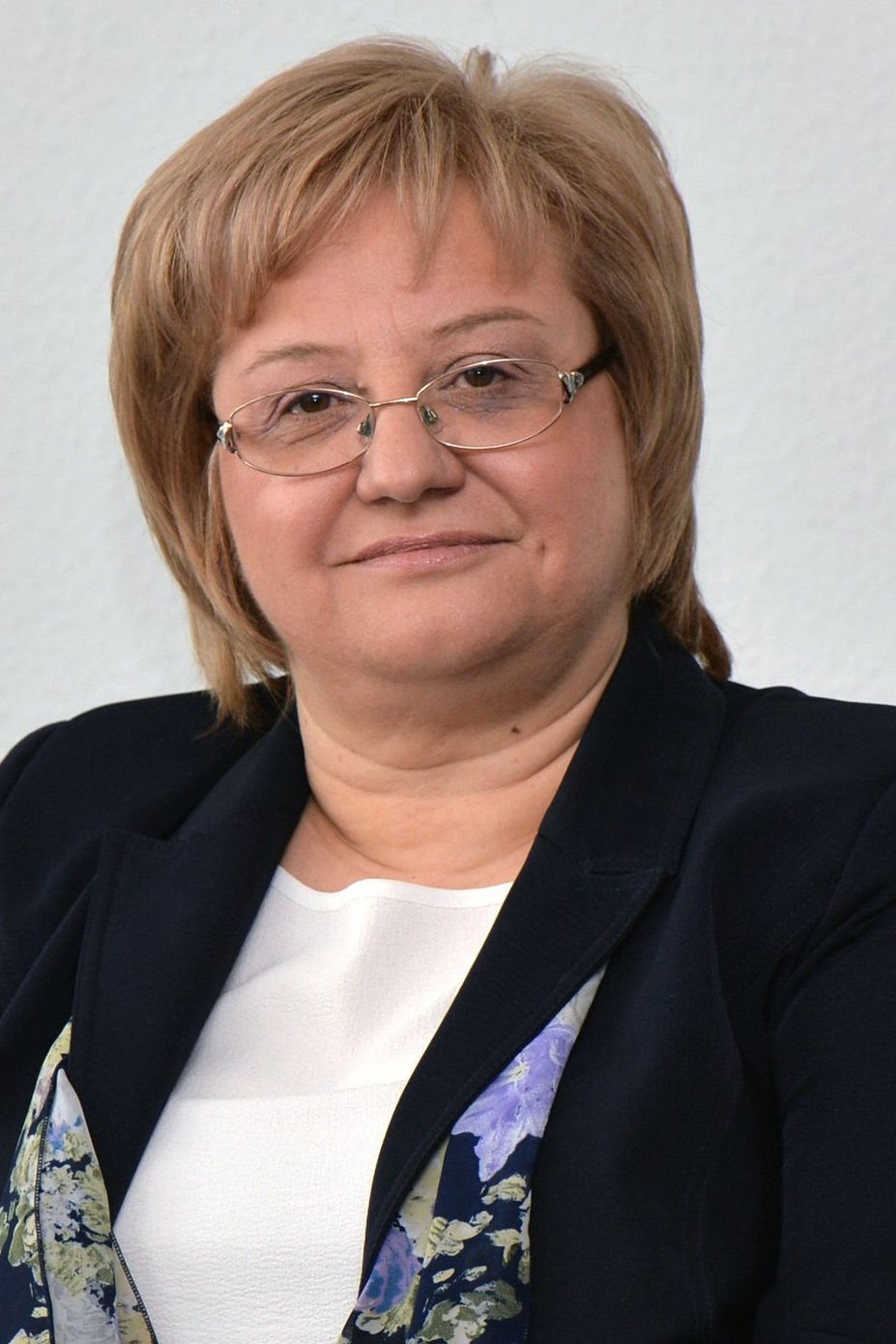
- Official portrait, 2018
- Born: 12 March 1967 (age 59); Byala, Ruse Province, Bulgaria
- Education: University of National and World Economy; Central European University
- Occupations: Statistician; Econometrician
- Organization(s): Eurostat; National Statistical Institute of Bulgaria

Mariana Mihaylova Kotzeva (Bulgarian: Мариана Михайлова Коцева, born 12 March 1967) is a Bulgarian statistician and econometrician. Since the beginning of 2017 she has been the acting director-general of Eurostat, the directorate-general of the European Commission responsible for providing statistical information to the institutions of the European Union and for harmonizing statistical methods across the Union. She is also the former president of the National Statistical Institute of Bulgaria.

== Early life and education ==
Kotzeva was born in Byala, Ruse Province. She earned a master's degree in economics in 1985 (specializing in economic statistics) from the University of National and World Economy in Sofia, Bulgaria. She earned a second master's degree in economics in 1993, from the Central European University in Prague under its charter from the University of the State of New York. In 1995 she completed a Ph.D. in economics, specializing in statistics and demography, from the University of National and World Economy.

== Career ==
Since 2003 Kotzeva has been on the faculty of the University of National and World Economy. Additionally, before joining Eurostat in 2014, she has worked for the Serbian Ministry of Labour and Employment, the United Nations Development Programme, the Bulgarian Ministry of Labour and Social Policy, and the National Statistical Institute of Bulgaria. She was the head of the National Statistical Institute from 2008 to 2012.

In 2012, she joined Eurostat as "adviser hors classe". She became deputy director-general at Eurostat in 2014, after the retirement of Marie Bohatá, and at that time became "the most senior Bulgarian civil servant in the European Union’s administration". She replaced Walter Radermacher as acting director-general in 2017.
