= Eurotheum =

31-storey, 110 m (360 ft) skyscraper in the city center of Frankfurt, Germany

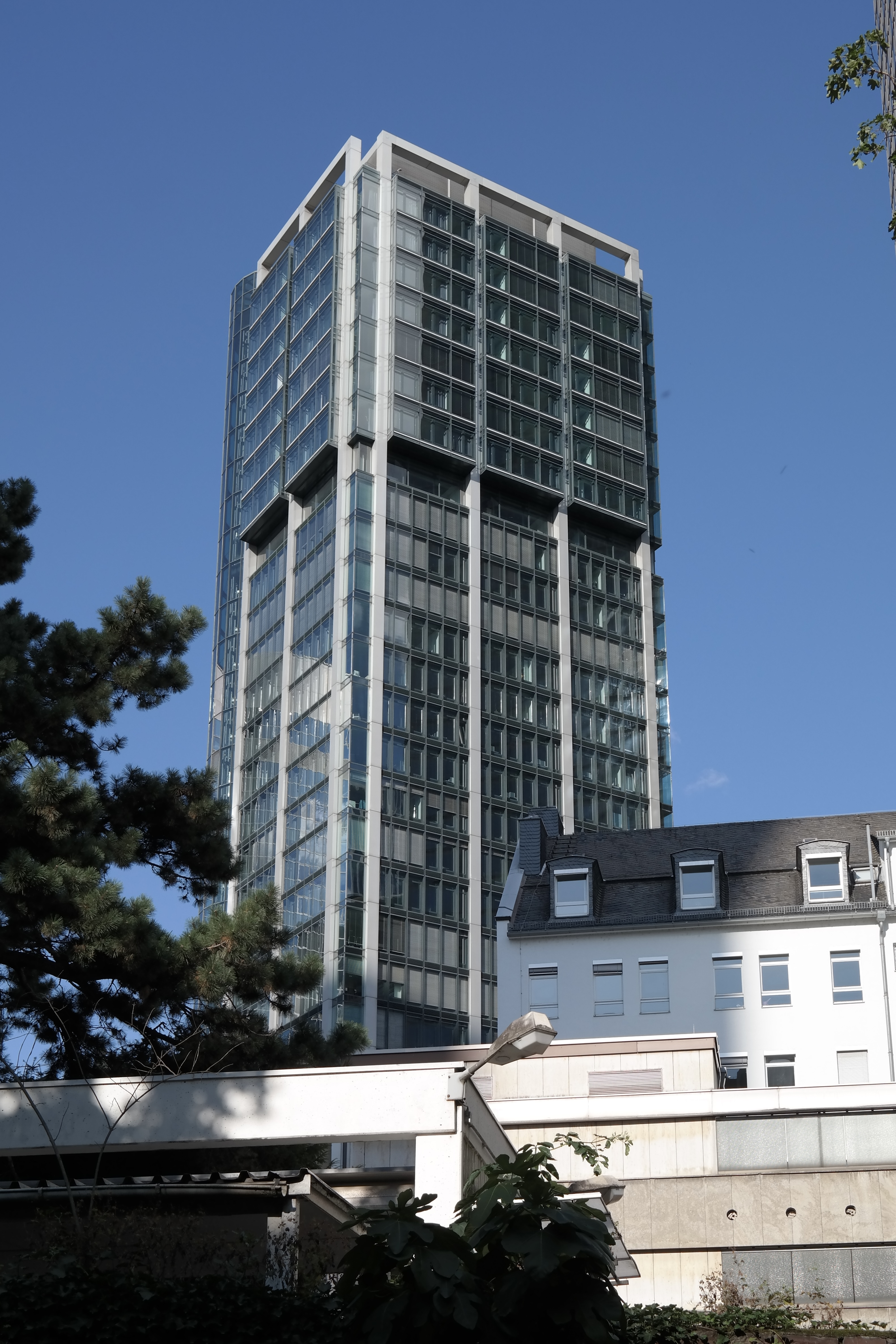
- Interactive map of the Eurotheum area

General information
- Type: Commercial offices; Serviced apartments
- Architectural style: Modernism
- Location: Neue Mainzer Straße 66–68; Frankfurt; Hesse, Germany
- Coordinates: 50°06′46″N 8°40′19″E
- Completed: 1997–1999

Height
- Roof: 110 m (360 ft)

Technical details
- Floor count: 31; 3 below ground
- Floor area: 34,680 m^{2} (373,300 sq ft)
- Lifts/elevators: 12

Design and construction
- Architect: Novotny Mähner Assoziierte
- Engineer: Arcadis Grebner Gesamtplanung GmbH
- Main contractor: Philipp Holzmann

Other information
- Public transit access: Taunusanlage

The Eurotheum is a 31-storey, 110 m (360 ft) skyscraper in the city center of Frankfurt, Germany. The building was completed in 1999, coinciding with the adjacent Main Tower, and is one of the first mixed-use buildings in Frankfurt that combined office and residential functions. From the 1st through 21st floors, the tower has a combined office space of 17,000 m^{2} (180,000 sq ft), which was occupied mostly by the European Central Bank as an extension of their former headquarters at Eurotower, Willy-Brandt-Platz until the end of 2014.

The 22nd floor has a public bar lounge. From the 22nd through 29th floors, the building has a hotel with 74 furnished apartments.

The building was designed by Novotny Mähner Assoziierte.

In December 2018, the building was bought by the German Estate Group (GEG) for €250 million.

== See also ==
- List of tallest buildings in Frankfurt
- List of tallest buildings in Germany
