= Sot =

Sot or SOT may refer to:

== Mathematics, science, and technology ==
- Small-outline transistor
- Society of Toxicology
- Sound on tape, in television broadcasting
- Strong operator topology, in mathematics

== Places ==
- Sot (village), Vojvodina, Serbia
- Sodankylä Airfield, Sodankylä, Lapland, Finland, IATA code
- Stoke-on-Trent railway station, England, station code

== Other uses ==
- Sotho language, a Bantu language of South Africa, ISO 639 code
- Special Occupational Taxpayers, some US Firearm Licensees
- Gamasot or sot, a Korean cauldron
- Gazeta Sot, a daily newspaper in Albania
- United States Secretary of Transportation
  - Also secretaries of transportation in many states

== See also ==
- Sots (disambiguation)
