= Kirchberg District Centre =

Mixed-use building complex in Luxembourg

- Stadtteilzentrum Kirchberg
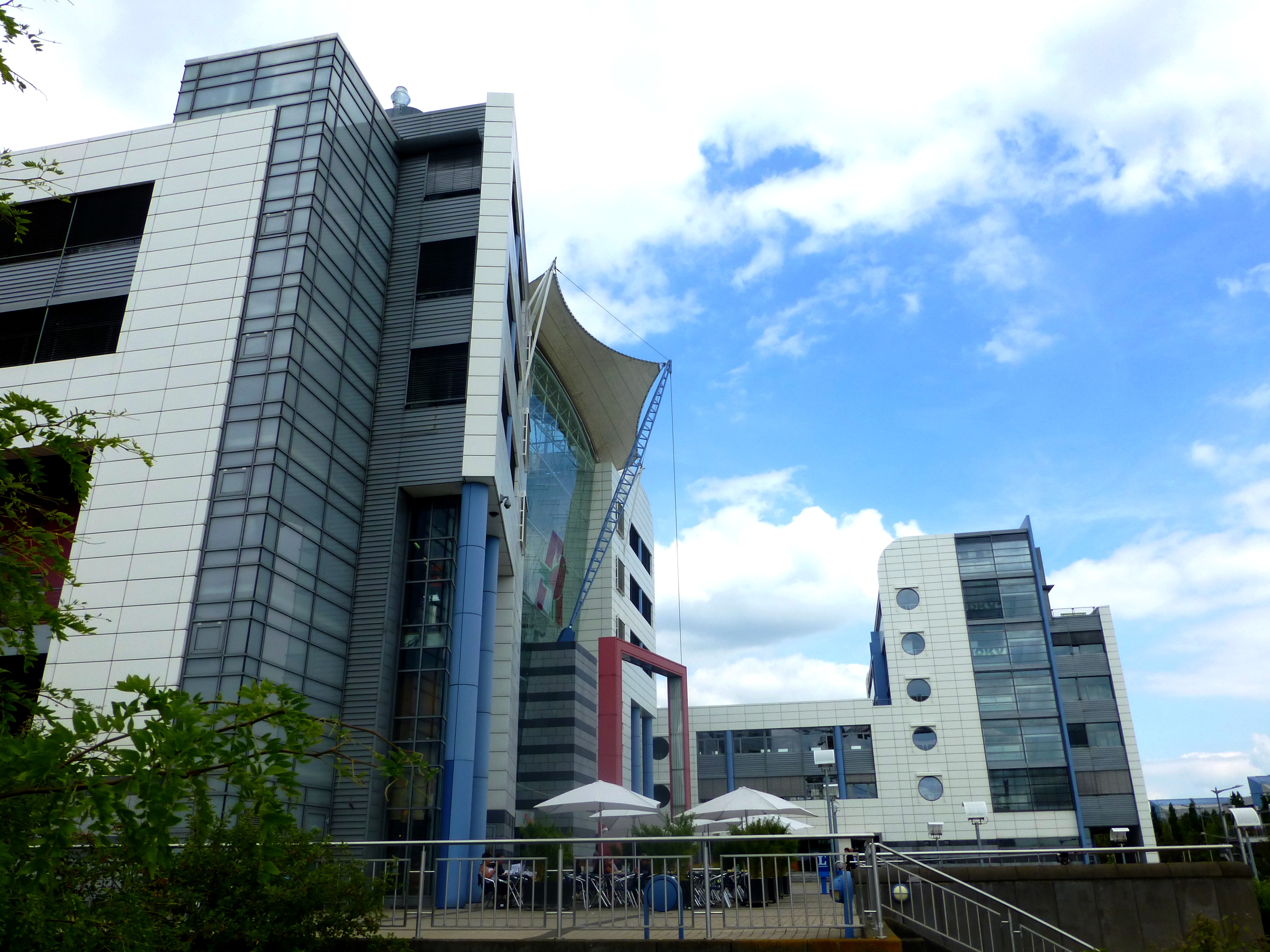
- Alternative names: Forum Kirchberg; Joseph Bech building (offices); Kirchberg Shopping Centre (shopping mall)

General information
- Type: Shopping mall and offices
- Coordinates: 49.633320°N 6.169780°E
- Current tenants: European Commission (principal office space occupant); Auchan (principal retail space occupant)
- Named for: Joseph Bech (offices)
- Opened: 1996 and 1998
- Renovated: 2008 to 2009 (food court addition)

Design and construction
- Architect: Martin Lammar
- Architecture firm: Atelier A+U

Other information
- Parking: 3,500 parking spaces
- Shopping mall details
- Opened: 26 November 1996
- Num. of stores: 66 shops 16 restaurants
- Public transit: Alphonse Weicker tramstop, Luxtram
- Website: kirchberg-shopping.lu/en

The Kirchberg District Centre (Note: Sometimes also referred to in literature as the "Forum Kirchberg".) (French: Centre de Quartier Kirchberg; German: Stadtteilzentrum Kirchberg) is a mixed-use building complex in northeastern Kirchberg, Luxembourg City, Luxembourg containing both an office complex and shopping mall, with their principal tenants respectively being the European Commission's statistical office, Eurostat, and an Auchan hypermarket. Those parts of the building dedicated to office use are collectively referred to as the "Joseph Bech building", after European Union (EU) pioneer and former Luxembourg prime minister, Joseph Bech. The complex's shopping gallery is referred to as the "Kirchberg Shopping Centre".

== History ==
=== Construction ===
Construction work on the Kirchberg District Centre began in October 1993, with those parts of the building related to the shopping mall completed in 1996, and the offices completed in September 1998. The total cost of the project was approximately 300 million euros.

The project's chief architect was Martin Lammar of local architectural firm Atelier A+U, in partnership with Lars Iwdal of Swedish architectural firm arkitektbyrån ab, and Murray Church of Hochtief Luxembourg.

Between 1999 and 2001, the building's car parking facilities were extended.

Between April 2008 and July 2009 a 5.13 million euro a new food court was added to the shopping mall in work carried out by local construction firm CBL, utilising a design by architectural firm Moreno Architecture & Associates.

=== Ownership and tenants ===
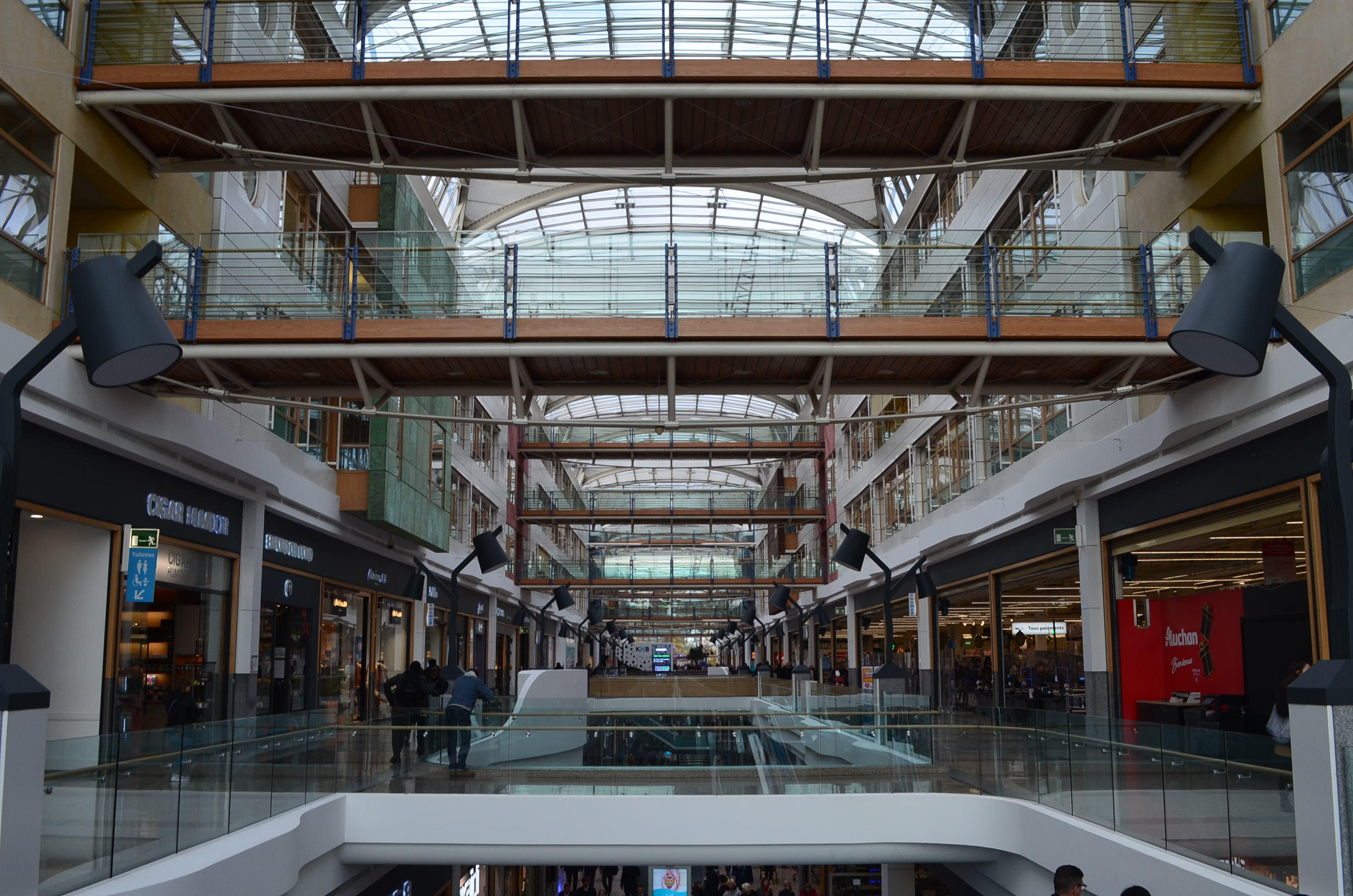
Inside the centre

Those parts of the building corresponding to the shopping mall were acquired by French retail group Auchan. An Auchan hypermarket, occupying the two storeys in the northeast of the shopping gallery, was installed as an anchor store. The retailer estimated a catchment area of 25 kilometres. The store, and the wider shopping mall, opened to the public on 26 November 1996. Martin Draber, then director of Auchan Kirchberg, said the primary commercial rationale for its opening was to "recover part of the 8 billion Luxembourg francs" spent annually by Luxembourg consumers outside of its borders, rather than to directly compete with local businesses. The shopping mall currently contains 66 shops and 16 restaurants.

The complex's office space, known as the Joseph Bech building, was, between 2004 and 2018, part of a closed-end real estate fund owned by Commerz Real before being sold to an anonymous buyer. Since the building opened in 1998, the principal tenant of the Joseph Bech building has been the European Commission, which uses the building to house its statistics body, Eurostat. This arrangement was made due to the lack of office space provided for by the institution's then main Luxembourg complex, the Jean Monnet building. The European Commission plans to vacate the building and the end of its current lease in 2023, with it relocating staff to the Jean Monnet 2 building, currently under construction in Kirchberg's European district.

== Design ==
The complex's main structure is an elongated five-story building, stretching from Avenue John F Kennedy to Circuit de la Foire Internationale. The main structure has a gross area of approximately 180,000 m^{2} (1,900,000 sq ft), and consists of two parallel galleries either side of a central atrium spanned by a glass and polytetrafluoroethylene (PTFE) canopy roof. The first and second storeys comprise the shopping mall area, whilst those storeys above are dedicated to office space. Bridges, which span the central atrium, above the shopping levels, connect the two parallel office spaces. Attached to the main structure, along its northern edge, facing rue Carlo Hemmer, are four identical parallel five-storey wings used as office space. Between the two wings closest to Circuit de la Foire Internationale lies a later extension to the shopping mall's second storey, in the form of a single-storey food court, adding 2,400 m (7,900 ft) of floor space. A cuboid five-storey office structure attached to the wing closest to John F Kennedy faces out onto the road. The Kirchberg District Centre is steel framed, with approximately 12,000 tonnes of steel used in the initial construction.

Much of the building infrastructure and the parking garage, with 3,500 parking spaces, are located in the three basement levels of the building.

Due to the increased terrain height of Circuit de la Foire Internationale, the building is stepped, with the pedestrian entrance to the shopping mall from Avenue John F Kennedy being raised from street level, and the shopping mall only occupying the second storey towards Circuit de la Foire Internationale.

== Location ==
The Kirchberg District Centre is situated in the Kiem section of Kirchberg. To the north is the country's largest cinema multiplex, Kinepolis Kirchberg, and Luxembourg's national exhibition centre, Luxexpo The Box. Located between the complex and Circuit de la Foire Internationale is the Kubik building, (Note: Previously known as the "Club House Kirchberg") a cube-shaped structure, currently occupied by the European Stability Mechanism.

The complex's official address, and principal street entrance for its office space is given as 5 rue Alphonse Weicker, with the street forming the southern border of the building. However, the public entrances to the shopping mall are located to the east on Avenue John F. Kennedy, to the west on Circuit de la Foire Internationale, and to the north via the food court on rue Carlo Hemmer.

== Transport ==
Since December 2017, the Kirchberg District Centre has been served by the Alphonse Weicker stop of the Luxembourg City tramway, located in front of the building's Avenue John F. Kennedy entrance.
