= Short-term business statistics =

Short-term business statistics (STS) are economic statistics published by Eurostat, the statistical office of the European Commission. They cover all member states of the European Union and - in some areas - also third countries, and provide aggregated results for the euro area and the EU. Short-term business statistics provide information on the economic development of four major domains: industry, construction, trade, and services. These domains are defined in relation to a classification of economic activities, the NACE Rev.2 (Statistical Classification of Economic Activities in the European Community, second revision).

For the four domains the following variables are reported (most on a monthly, some on a quarterly basis):

- Industry: Production, turnover (domestic and non-domestic), number of persons employed, hours worked, gross wages and salaries, producer prices (domestic and non-domestic), import prices.
- Construction: Production (total, of buildings and of civil engineering), number of persons employed, hours worked, gross wages and salaries, construction prices and costs (material costs, wage costs), construction permits.
- Trade: Trade volume, turnover, number of persons employed, hours worked, gross wages and salaries.
- Services: Production, turnover, output prices (service producer prices), number of persons employed, hours worked, gross wages and salaries.

The legal base for the European short-term business statistics is Regulation (EU) 2019/2152 of the European Parliament and of the Council of 27 November 2019.
