= Jean Monnet 2 building =

Office complex in Luxembourg

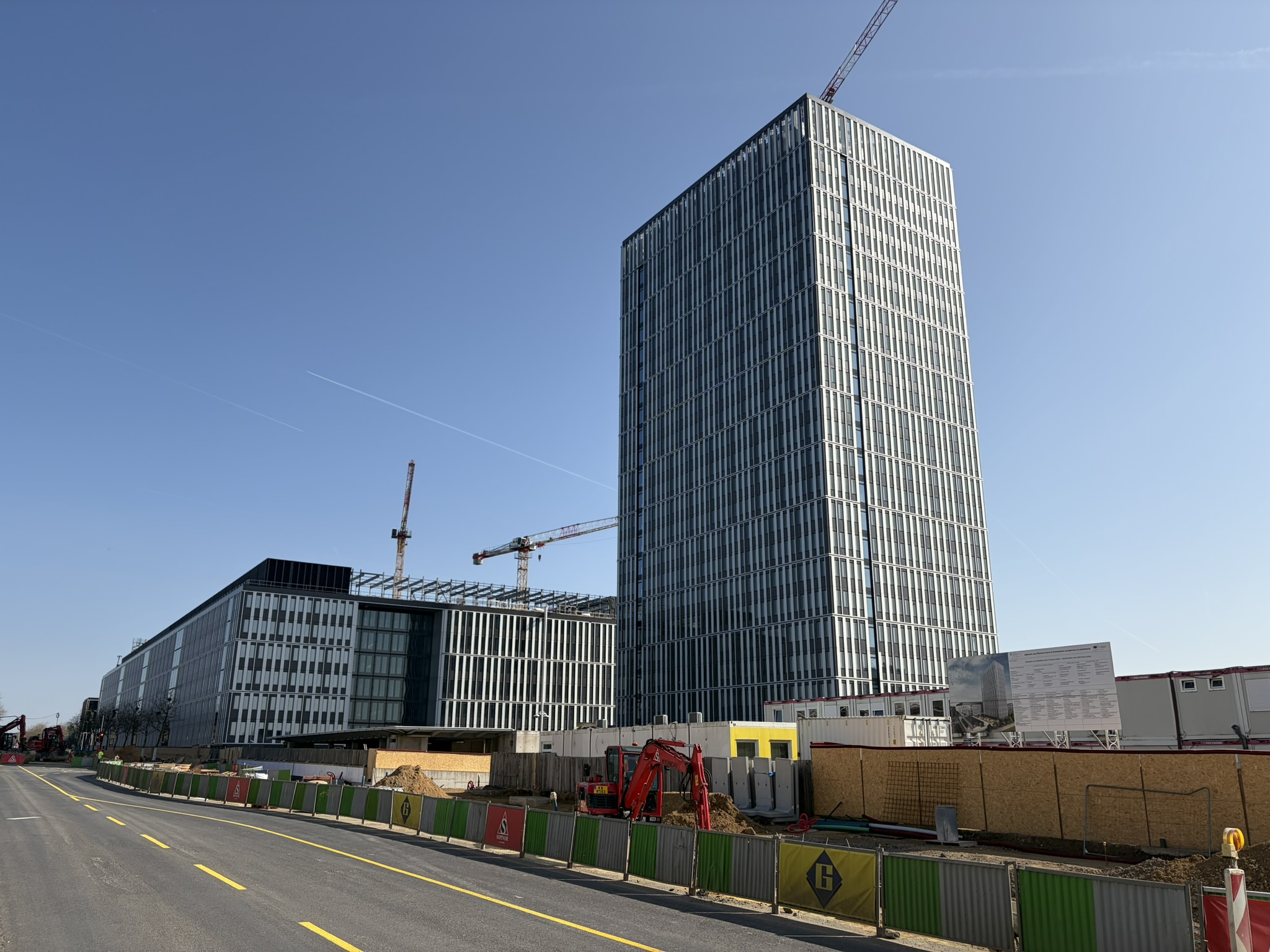
- Construction progress as of March 2026.
- Interactive map of the Jean Monnet 2 building area
- Alternative names: JMO2

General information
- Status: Under construction
- Type: Office complex for the European Commission
- Location: Boulevard Konrad Adenauer, Kirchberg, Luxembourg City, Luxembourg
- Coordinates: 49.624534°N 6.146920°E
- Named for: Jean Monnet
- Groundbreaking: 4 June 2018
- Estimated completion: May 2028 (Block); 2028–2029 (Tower)
- Cost: €992,500,000
- Client: Luxembourg government on behalf of the European Commission

Technical details
- Floor count: 8 (Block, excluding basement); 24 (Tower, excluding basement)
- Floor area: 138,000 m^{2} (gross) (Block); 52,000 m^{2} (gross) (Tower)

Design and construction
- Architecture firm: KSP Jürgen Engel Architekten
- Services engineer: EDEIS
- Civil engineer: Bollinger+Grohmann Ing.
- Main contractor: Secolux Group S.A.

Other information
- Public transit: Commission européenne tram stop, LuxTram (due late 2027)

The Jean Monnet 2 building (also known as JMO2) is a future office complex for the European Commission under construction on Boulevard Konrad Adenauer in the European district of the Kirchberg, in Luxembourg City, Luxembourg. The complex is to be composed of a welcome pavilion and two office buildings to be completed in two phases respectively; an 8-storey 180 metre (m) long block and a 24-storey tower, connected at the basement and second storey levels. The first phase was expected to be completed by late February 2023, and the second phase by late February 2024. This timetable was pushed back due to the global COVID-19 pandemic and contractor delays, with staff transfer completion for the first phase not now not expected to be completed until November 2028. The first Jean Monnet building, opened in 1975, was demolished between 2016 and 2019, after exceeding its lifespan, and following the discovery of airborne traces of asbestos. The construction site combines some of the plot of the previous building with an adjacent former open air car park. Upon completion, the Jean Monnet 2 building will enable the European Commission to consolidate the majority of its Luxembourg-based staff on one site. Like its predecessor, the building's namesake is European Union (EU) founding father Jean Monnet.

== Background ==
=== History of the Commission in Luxembourg ===
The European Commission's presence in Luxembourg City goes back to 1952, when the city was chosen as the provisional work place of the Commission's forerunner, the High Authority of the European Coal and Steel Community (ECSC). Upon the 1958 foundations of the European Economic Community (EEC) and European Atomic Energy Community (Euratom), the governments of the communities' states decided that their executive commissions, would have their seats split between Brussels and Luxembourg. This arrangement was maintained following the 1965 decision to merge the executives of the three communities, into a single Commission.

=== Original Jean Monnet building ===
In 1961, the Luxembourg government began promoting the Luxembourg City district of Kirchberg as a headquarters for European institutions, with the founding of the Kirchberg Plateau Development Fund (or Fonds Kirchberg) — an urban development body of the government. In the early 1970s, construction began on the first Jean Monnet building (JMO1), commissioned by the Luxembourg government on land owned by the Fund, with its aim being to consolidate all the European Commission's existing Luxembourg based staff onto one site. In 1975, the Commission moved in, signing a lease agreement with the Kirchberg Fund.

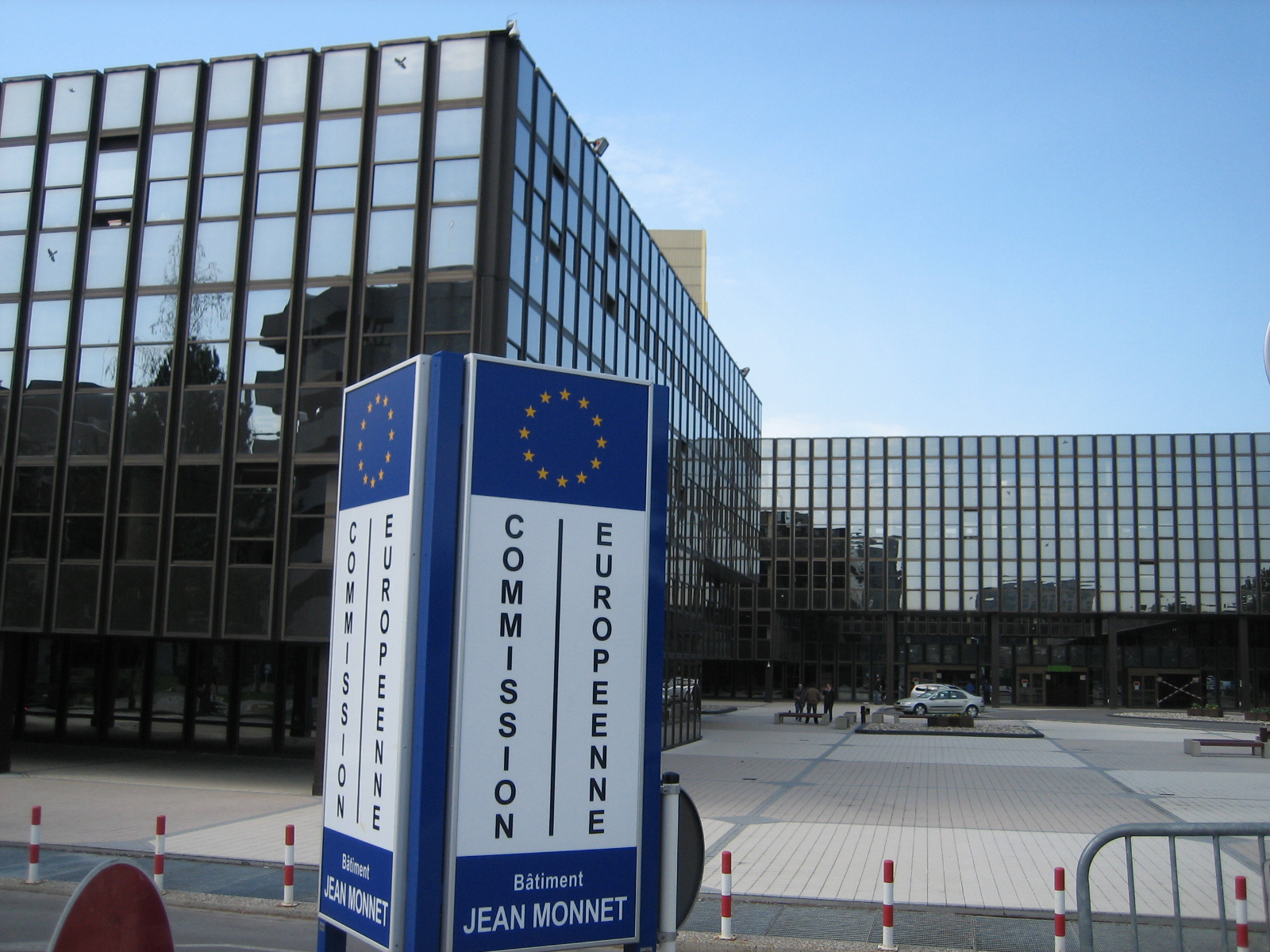
The original Jean Monnet building, seen here in 2009.

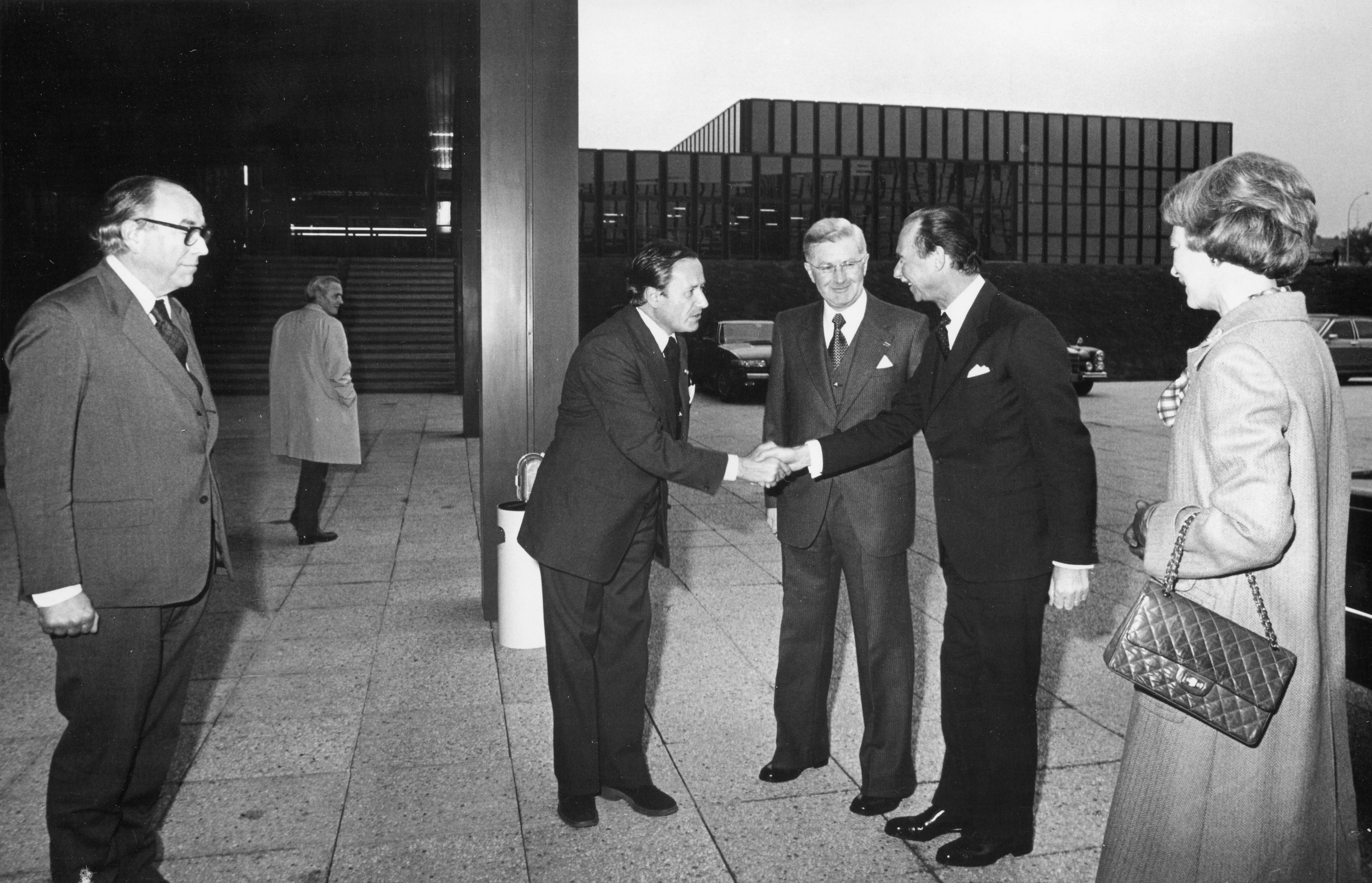
Prime Minister Gaston Thorn and Grand Duke Jean at the original building's inauguration in 1977

However, the building was constructed with an intended lifespan of just 25 years, and additionally, was planned to accommodate the staffing requirements of a European Communities of just 9 states and a Commission of more limited responsibilities. The European Council's decision, taken in Edinburgh in 1992, to codify the Commission's workplaces as Brussels and Luxembourg City, led to discussions, starting in 1994, on renovating the Jean Monnet building, and finding more suitable premises across the city to accommodate staffing needs. In 1996, the Commission moved into the Joseph Bech building, constructed in northeastern Kirchberg.

The Commission's need for more office accommodation intensified following the 2004 EU enlargement from 15 to 25 states, and the subsequent increase in staff numbers. A 2007 policy communication from the Commission's Office of Infrastructure and Logistics, stated that, at the time of publication, the Commission occupied 5 office premises in Luxembourg City; 2 in Kirchberg, and 3 in Gasperich. It said that the institution was making inefficient use of office space across the city, with the occupation of too many smaller office premises; it was spending too much money on the rental of properties; its staff was spread out too far from other supporting services such as crèches and schooling; and the current Jean Monnet building was ill-equipped to handle the hosting the Commission's IT and data services. To that end, the communication stated that Commission policy would be to push for a total rebuild of the then existing Jean Monnet building, with the Commission taking ownership of the future property.

=== Agreement on a new building ===
In September 2009, the Luxembourg government and the Commission signed a memorandum of understanding, in which the Luxembourg government agreed to hand over a plot of land for the construction of a new Jean Monnet building to the Commission for the symbolic price of 1 euro, and furthermore for the Luxembourg government to finance its construction and be reimbursed from the EU budget upon its completion and subsequent transfer of ownership to the Commission. This ended a long-term dispute, which since April 1998, had seen the Commission refuse to enter a tenancy agreement for the building over protest at its condition, and its belief that this was not adequately reflected in the rental fees requested by the Kirchberg Fund, instead paying a flat "occupation fee".

== Design ==
=== Architectural competition ===
In 2010 the Luxembourg government launched an international architectural competition for the design of the new building, with architectural firm JSWD Architekten's design unanimously awarded first prize by jurors. However, due to a dispute between the Luxembourg Ministry of Sustainable Development and JSWD Architekten over contractual fees, the runner-up design by KSP Jurgen Engel Architekten was later selected.

=== Phased approach ===
In line with the criteria of the architectural competition, the final design of the Jean Monnet 2 complex sees it being completed in two phases, with the first phase accommodating staff displaced during the demolition of the original building, and the second stage accommodating staff relocating from Commission offices in Gasperich:

- Phase 1 will consist of an 8 storey tall 180 m long main block, with 4 glass-roofed inner courtyards and its technical infrastructure housed in the top storey. It will have a gross surface area of approximately 138,000 square metres (m^{2}), and work stations for 2,400 staff. The building will include four basement levels, which extend under the forecourt of the joint building complex, three of which will be dedicated to car parking.
- Phase 2 consists of a 24-storey tower, with its technical infrastructure also housed in the top storey. It will have a gross surface area of approximately 52,000 m^{2}, with 4 floors of parking in the basement, and provide work stations for 1,200 staff.

The main block and tower will be linked at the basement level and via an enclosed footbridge connecting their second storeys. A landscaped forecourt will be created at the ground level between the two buildings, with a separate "Welcome Pavilion", acting as a visitors centre, facing Boulevard Konrad Adenauer to be constructed in front of the tower and adjacent to the main block.

=== Facilities and logistics ===
The ground floor and first 2 floors of the basement level of the main block will contain all facilities open to resident Commission employees, inter-institutional employees and visitors. This includes;

- the dining areas consisting of a 120-seat cafeteria, a 1,200 seat self-service restaurant equipped to serve 2,400 meals per day, and an 80-seat à la carte restaurant;
- a conference centre with a capacity of 1,260 seats, including a large 350 seat auditorium and 5 conference rooms, all equipped with interpretation booths;
- a library;
- a health centre and gyms;
- a medical centre;
- a retail space.

Logistical services associated with running the building, including, amongst others, the postal sorting room and changing rooms for service staff will be mainly located on the first basement floor of the main block, whilst the basement levels of the tower will hold the office complexes' archiving facilities.

=== Energy efficiency ===
The building was designed to meet class "A" energy performance requirements and BREEAM's "excellent" level certification. The design includes, amongst other energy efficiency features, triple-glazed windows, radiant ceiling panels, offices designed to optimise the use of natural light, an all LED artificial lighting installation, and roof mounted photovoltaic panels. The building will be connected to Kirchberg's existing district heating system via two heat exchanges.

== Location ==
The building will occupy a plot of land along Boulevard Konrad Adenauer, which forms its northern edge, and is bordered by rue Erasme to the east, and rue Antoine de Saint-Exupéry to the south, which will be extended to border the complex to west and meet with Boulevard Konrad Adenauer. (Note: The reconfiguration of the road layout around the site was originally drawn up by urban development planner Dominique Perrault's architectural bureau, based on studies commissioned by the Kirchberg Fund.) The site combines some of the plot of the previous Jean Monnet building, on which the tower will sit, with an adjacent former open air car park to the east, where the main block will sit. Rue Albert Wehrer, which currently intersects the site, will be converted for pedestrian use only and made a part of the complexes' forecourt.

The site will occupy the Kirchberg's European district. To the building's southwest, along Boulevard Konrad Adenauer is the seat of the Court of Justice of the European Union, and to its south, across rue Antoine de Saint-Exupéry is the IAK building, currently occupied by the European Investment Bank. Further to the south are located the seat of the European Court of Auditors, and the Konrad Adenauer building, housing the European Parliament's secretariat.

== Construction ==
=== Demolition of the original building ===
A 2015 memorandum of understanding between the Luxembourg government and the European Commission aimed for October 2020 as the target date for the completion of phase 1 of the new building. However, revisions to the security concept for the building and changes related to data centre space, introduced in December 2016, set the target date for completion of phase 1 of the building back to February 2023, with Phase 2 expected by February 2024. This timetable was further delayed owing to the global COVID-19 pandemic, and further still due to significant contractor delays. The current expected delivery date for Phase 1 is May 2028, with staff move in for this phase expected to be completed 6 months thereafter. There remains no official delivery date for Phase 2.

Whilst the criteria set down in the design competition specified the first Jean Monnet building remaining occupied during the construction of the first phase of the new complex, the 2014 discovery of airborne traces of asbestos in the original building led the Commission to begin transferring staff off premises in late 2014, relocating them to other additional office premises in the Gare and Gasperich districts of the city, and a temporary building constructed in Kirchberg in 2016 by the Luxembourg government.

Demolition works on the former building began in 2016, following the formal closure of the former building. Around 400 tonnes of aluminium, 150 tonnes of glass and 45 tonnes of wood were recycled from the structure in the process. Demolition works were completed in late 2019 at a cost of €25 million.

=== Construction of the new building ===
Preparatory work began in March 2018, and a groundbreaking ceremony for the construction of new building was held on 4 June 2018 in the presence of mayor Lydie Polfer, European Commissioner Günther Oettinger, prime minister Xavier Bettel, and Minister for Infrastructure François Bausch.

=== Contractors ===
The JMO2's design team consists of KSP Jürgen Engel Architekten as the lead architectural firm, civil engineering by Bollinger+Grohmann Ing and services engineering by EDEIS. The Luxembourg government appointed Secolux to as the prime contractor for the project.

=== Cost and financing ===
The new building's original costing was, estimated in October 2015, at 526.3 million euros. Reporting in October 2024 had revealed that cost had risen to 992.5 million euros due to significant overruns and inflation.The cost will initially be borne by the Luxembourg government, and reimbursed from the EU budget upon the handing over of the completed phases. The land on which the building stands, which has an estimated market value of 300 million euros, was sold by the Luxembourg government to the Commission for the symbolic price of 1 euro.

== Name ==
Like the original complex, the new building will bear the name of EU founding father, and first President of the High Authority of the European Coal and Steel Community, Jean Monnet. (Note: Monnet was also a strong proponent of Luxembourg as the single seat of the European project.)

== Transport ==
In addition to the car parking facilities envisaged for the building, the site will be served by regional and municipal buses serving the "Jean Monnet" bus stop on Boulevard Konrad Andeauer, located in front of the building's welcome pavilion. An extension to Luxembourg City's tram services began construction in 2025 which will serve the building via the new stop "Commission européenne" by late 2027.

Bicycle parking facilities for approximately 160 bicycles will be installed in the tower building, with the Luxembourg City authorities aiming to improve the network of bike paths to the site.

== See also ==
- Euroforum building
- Joseph Bech building
