= Slavcho Zagorov =

- Славчо Загоров
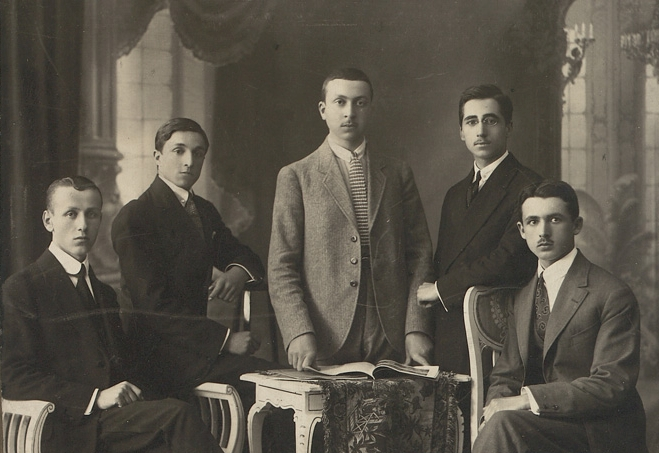
- Slavcho Zagorov (standing centre) with D. Paskalev, B. Kozhuharov and E. Marinov on May 27, 1916 in Sofia
- Born: November 25, 1898; Sofia, Bulgaria
- Died: December 14, 1970 (aged 72); Vienna, Austria
- Citizenship: Austrian (naturalized)

Academic background
- Education: University of Bern; Leipzig University
- Doctoral advisor: Georgi Danailov

Academic work
- Discipline: Economics, statistics
- Institutions: University of Regensburg; Stanford University; Ludwig-Maximilians-Universität München; University of Vienna

Slavcho Zagorov or Slawtscho Sagoroff (25 November 1898 – 14 December 1970) was a Bulgarian-Austrian economist and statistician who is best known for his approach to examine economies in terms of energy flows. He considered national income as a measure of the movement of energy in his publications “The Concept of Energy in Economics” (1954) and “National Income and General Productivity in Terms of Energy” (1955).

== Life and work ==
Zagorov was born in Sofia and studied economics at the University of Bern, followed by studies at Sofia University, the University of Innsbruck, and finally Leipzig University where he took a doctorate. He then worked in the economic council of Bulgaria. He was a student of Georgi Danailov. He also studied statistics and mathematics and spent some time at Harvard University as a Rockefeller fellow. He also spent time at the London School of Economics. In 1934, he became a director of the Bulgarian Statistical Office and was involved in the 9th national census. He worked with the League of Nations from 1938 to 1939 as part of the Danubian study group. From 1942 to 1944, he was Bulgaria's ambassador in Berlin. At the end of the war, he was tried as a fascist by the communist regime and forced into exile. He worked at various times at the University of Regensburg, Stanford University (1950-54), and at the Ludwig-Maximilians-Universität München. He finally moved the University of Vienna where he headed the statistical institute. He became an Austrian citizen. He was involved in the merger of the Austrian journal Statistische Vierteljahresschrift and the German Mitteilungsblatt für Mathematische Statistik into a new journal called Metrika while also serving as its editor. Zagorov was a promoter of econometrics and examined analogies from physics and biology in economics. He looked at Ohm's Law in national economics, productivity through physics, and even looked at statistical approaches to the study of schizophrenia.

Zagorov's first work on energy and economics was published in German as “Die energetische Betrachtung des wirtschaftlichen Geschehens” (1954). His work on physics in economics had already been indicated in “The Concept of Productivity in Physics, Economics and Biology” (1953). He worked on energy-based measures of economic productivity. He also looked at the relationship of energy to utility, social welfare, and other aims. He collaborated with other economists including Wassily Leontief and later followed the work of the Romanian economist Nicholas Georgescu-Roegen (1906–1994).
