= Evgeni Mateev =

Bulgarian Marxist economist, academic and politician

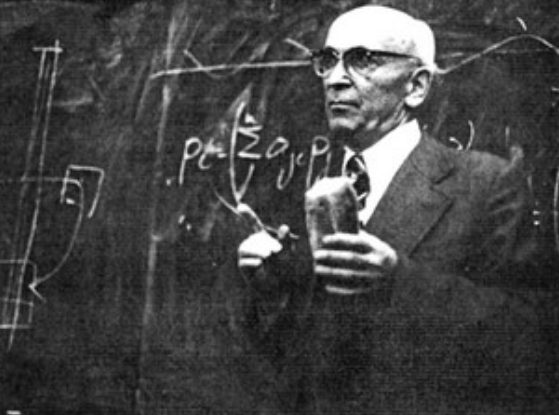
- Academician Evgeni Mateev during a lecture at the University of National and World Economy

Chairman of the State Planning Commission
- In office 28 February 1952 – 26 December 1952
- Preceded by: Karlo Lukanov
- Succeeded by: Georgi Chankov

Personal details
- Born: 1 April 1920 Pleven, Bulgaria
- Died: 4 June 1994 (aged 74) Sofia, Bulgaria
- Party: BCP
- Education: Sofia University
- Profession: Economist

Evgeni Georgiev Mateev (Bulgarian: Евгени Георгиев Матеев; 1 April 1920 – 4 June 1994) was a Bulgarian Marxist economist, academic and politician.

== Biography ==
Mateev was born in the family of a railway official. He graduated from the Sofia Theological Seminary in 1939 and the Sofia University in 1943 from the Faculty of Law. Since 1939 he has been a member of the Workers' Youth League and became a participant in the underground communist movement.

After the September 1944 coup d'état, Mateev began working as a journalist and soon entered the government of Bulgaria. He was chairman of the State Planning Commission in 1952, a minister in 1963–1966, a member of the State Council of the People's Republic in 1974–1981 . From 1953 to 1959 he served as chairman of the Central Statistical Bureau, from 1962 to 1966 he was a member of the Central Committee of the Bulgarian Communist Party. From 1964 to 1972 he was chairman of the Presidium of the Higher Attestation Commission under the Ministerial Council. From 1972 to 1981 Mateev Chairman of the council for the reproduction of material resources under the State Council. From 1968 to 1971 he was Chairman of the United Nations Economic Commission for Europe.

In 1950, Mateev received the title of professor, and in 1967 an academician of the Bulgarian Academy of Sciences. He became an academician of the Academy of Sciences of the Soviet Union in 1976, after the collapse of the USSR he retained this post already in the Russian Academy of Sciences. He was elected as a deputy to the 4th and 7th People's Assemblies of Bulgaria.

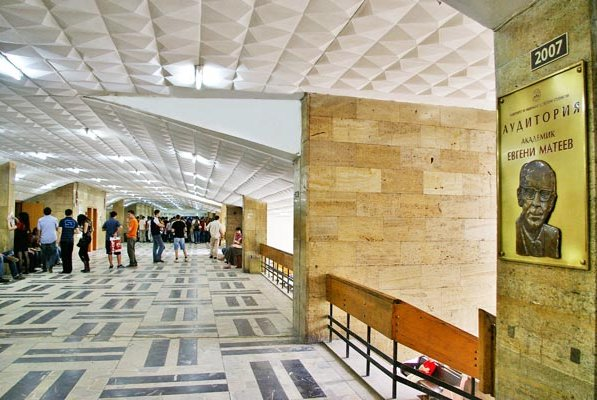
Auditorium "Evgeni Mateev" at UNSS

Mateev died on 4 June 1994, after a long illness. In his honor, an auditorium in the University of National and World Economy bears his name.

== Works ==
In his economic views, Mateev was a prominent opponent of the Austrian school of economics, also of the ideas and reforms in the spirit of so-called market socialism. According to him, the proponents of market socialism offer in practice a return to "idealized capitalism, and that of the age of free competition."
