= ATP architects engineers =

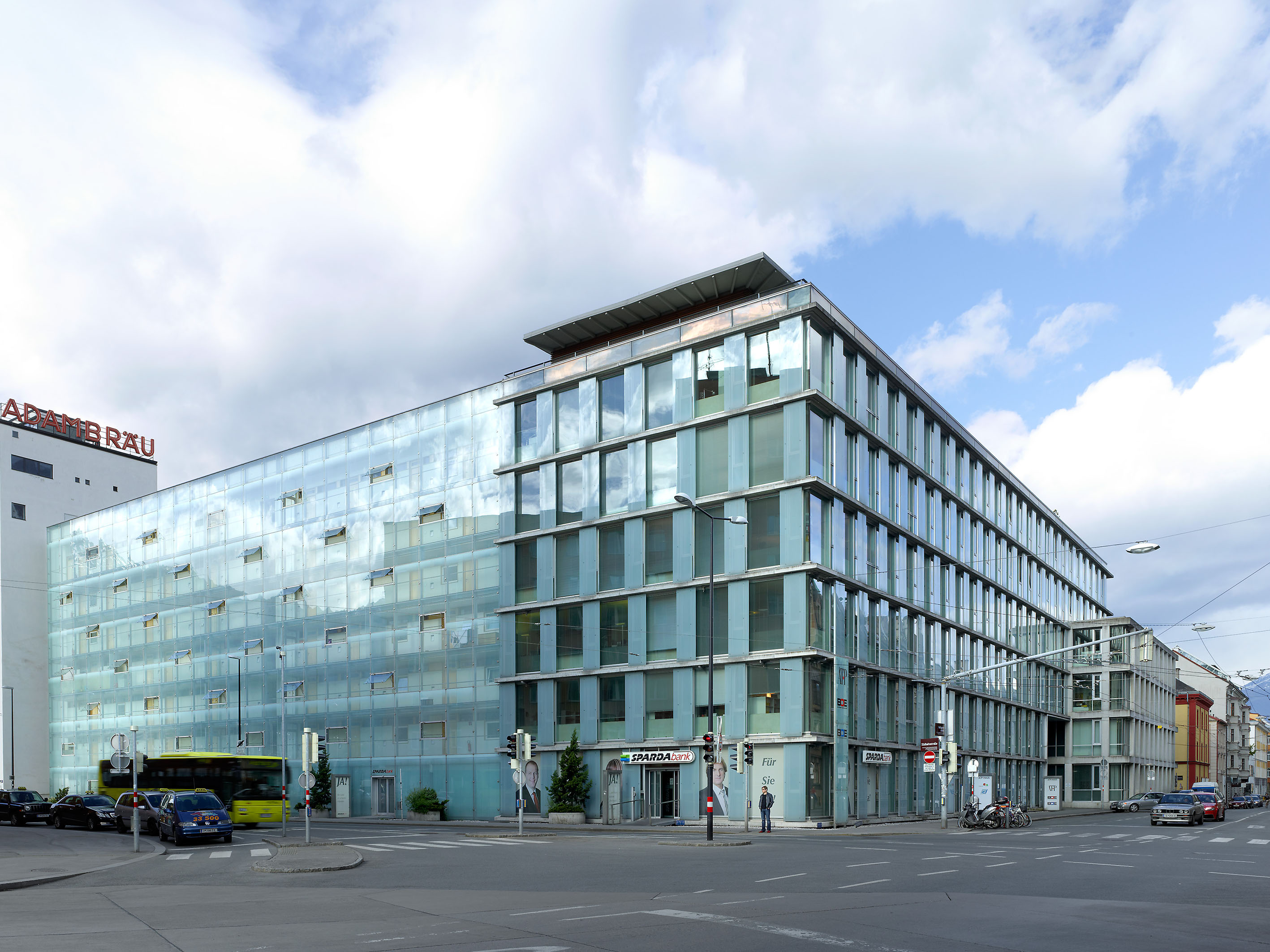
- Headquarters ATP architects engineers
- Type: Private (AG)
- Industry: Architecture, Engineering, Research
- Founded: 1951
- Headquarters: Innsbruck, Austria
- Key people: Christoph M. Achammer, CEO
- Number of employees: 1500+ (21 June 2023)
- Website: www.atp.ag

ATP architects engineers is an international architecture- and engineering office for integrated design with a headquarters in Innsbruck, Austria and further design offices in Vienna, Munich, Frankfurt, Berlin, Nuremberg, Hamburg, Karlsruhe, Zürich, Zagreb, Budapest, Moscow and Kraków.

== Organization ==
ATP architects engineers (ATP) is specialized in integrated design. The office has had an interdisciplinary design culture since 1976.

In 2013, ATP became the first architectural firm in the world to have its integrated design processes certified to ISO 9001 by Bureau Veritas.

With more than 1500 employees from 38 countries and thirteen operative integrated design companies in 2023, ATP is one of Europe’s largest architecture- and engineering companies.

The office is active in the areas of architecture, interior design, structural engineering, mechanical and electrical engineering (TGA) and site supervision (ÖBA). The focus of its activities is integrated design for the retail and industrial sectors as well as for the real estate, leisure, tourism and health sectors. Further areas of business include process planning for the food industry (foodfab), real estate development consulting (Redserve), Building engineering physics, research and certification in the area of sustainability (ATP sustain), research in the areas of architecture and integrated design (ATP sphere) and integrated IT solutions for design and business processes (Plandata).

Structured as a corporate group, ATP is led by a four-man executive board. The CEO is Christoph M. Achammer. The shares in ATP Planungs- und Beteiligungs AG are owned by the partners involved in the active management of the various companies. The Joint Stock Company ATP has a participation model in which more than 20% of employees are partners, associate partners or associates and, as such, share in the success of the company. There are currently nine partners, 45 associate partners and 104 associates.

Central to ATP's design philosophy is the creation of lifecycle-oriented and sustainable buildings with the support of integrated design methods.

In his role as Professor of Industrial Building and Interdisciplinary Planning at Vienna University of Technology, Christoph M. Achammer is committed to the exchange of practice-oriented knowledge and theoretical basic research in the area of integrated design.

ATP is a founder and member of the board of IG Lebenszyklus Hochbau and, through Christoph M. Achammer, is involved in the development of guidelines for public and private clients. ATP is also a founding member of the DGNB e.V., the German Sustainable Building Council, and the Austrian Sustainable Building Council. ATP is a member of the Arbeitsgemeinschaft Industriebau e.v., the International Council of Shopping Centers, the ACSC (Austria) and the GCSC (Germany). As an organizing partner of the European Forum Alpbach, ATP was responsible for drawing up the program of the “Alpbach Architecture Forum” between 2001 and 2005.

== History ==
In 1951, the architect (ETH) Fred Achammer opened an architecture office in Innsbruck which focused on building industrial and logistics buildings in the German-speaking Region. In 1976, Fred Achammer, the construction engineer Sigfrid Tritthart and the mechanical engineer Gunther Fröhlich formed a partnership whose objective was to act as an integrated design company offering integrated design based on the Anglo-American model. The office was initially known as ATP Achammer Tritthart Fröhlich (ATF) and subsequently, after the death of Gunther Fröhlich in 1986, as AT Achammer Tritthart Generalplaner. In 1985 ATP expanded to Vienna and, in 1987, Christoph M. Achammer succeeded his father, becoming the partner responsible for architecture in 1989. At that time, ATP Achammer Tritthart and Partner had 80 employees. Branch offices were established in Munich, Leipzig, Dresden and Zagreb. In 1999, ATP became a stock corporation.

In 2002, Christoph M. Achammer was appointed Professor of Industrial Building and Interdisciplinary Planning at Vienna University of Technology. In 2007, the Frankfurt-based N+M architects (formerly Novotny Mähner), specialists in high-rise buildings and the health sector, became an active member of the ATP Group. In 2008, the office was renamed ATP architects engineers. The subsequent years saw the creation of the research companies ATP sphere and ATP sustain. In 2009, the office of N+M architects was renamed in ATP N+M Architekten und Ingenieure GmbH.

In 2010, ATP integrated the Zurich-based residential building specialists, kfp architekten ag. In 2011 a joint venture with Tsimailo Lyashenko & Partners Architectural Bureau (TLP) led to the establishment of a Moscow office. The ATP Academy, an internal training program for integrated design was set up in 2013. In 2014, the partnership with Frankfurt resulted in the creation of the health sector design company ATP health. In the same year, the office of ATP N+M Architekten und Ingenieure GmbH was renamed as ATP Frankfurt.

ATP architects engineers is one of Europe’s largest integrated design offices. The annual BD online survey rated ATP as one of the three largest architectural offices in Continental Europe in 2011, 2012 and 2014. In the 2012 ranking, ATP was named the world’s sixth largest designer of shopping architecture. Baunetz put ATP in first place in the “designing for industry” category in January 2014.

== Buildings and projects ==
(Selection)

- Urban District Im Lenz, Lenzburg (Switzerland), 2018
- Urban Development Project Schwabinger Tor, Munich (Germany), 2017
- IFAM Fraunhofer Research Building IFAM, Bremen (Germany), 2014
- BASF Administration Building, Ludwigshafen (Germany), 2014
- Teaching and Research Building for the Faculties of Architecture and Engineering Science of the University of Innsbruck, Innsbruck (Austria), 2014
- General Refurbishment of the Westpfalz-Klinikum, Kaiserslautern (Germany), 2013
- General Refurbishment of the Shopping City Süd Shopping Center during normal operations, Vösendorf (Austria), 2013
- General Refurbishment of the Mannheim University Clinic, Mannheim (Germany), 2013
- G3 Shopping Resort, Gerasdorf near Vienna (Austria), 2012
- aspern IQ Technology Center, Vienna (Austria), 2012 – Austria's first plus energy building
- Hilti P4plus Production and Logistics Building, Thüringen (Austria), 2009 – Austria's first ÖGNI (Silver) certified industrial building
- Westgate Shopping Center, Zagreb (Croatia), 2009
- Atrio Shopping Center (SES), Villach (Austria), 2007 – ICSC Best of the Best-Award 2009
- Sillpark Shopping Center, Innsbruck (Austria), 2007
- Corporate Architecture for EDEKA Süd (Germany), 2006, 2012
- Sandoz Office and Logistics Building, Kundl (Austria), 2003
- ams Microchip Plant, Graz/Unterpremstätten (Austria), 2001
- Infineon Administration Building, Villach (Austria), 2001
- Millennium Tower, Vienna (Austria), 1999 – Austria's highest office building at the time (and now the second)
- Corporate Architecture for Interspar shopping centers (Austria), 1997 - heute
- SIMEC Siemens Microelectronics Center (heute Infineon), Dresden (Germany), 1995

== Project images ==
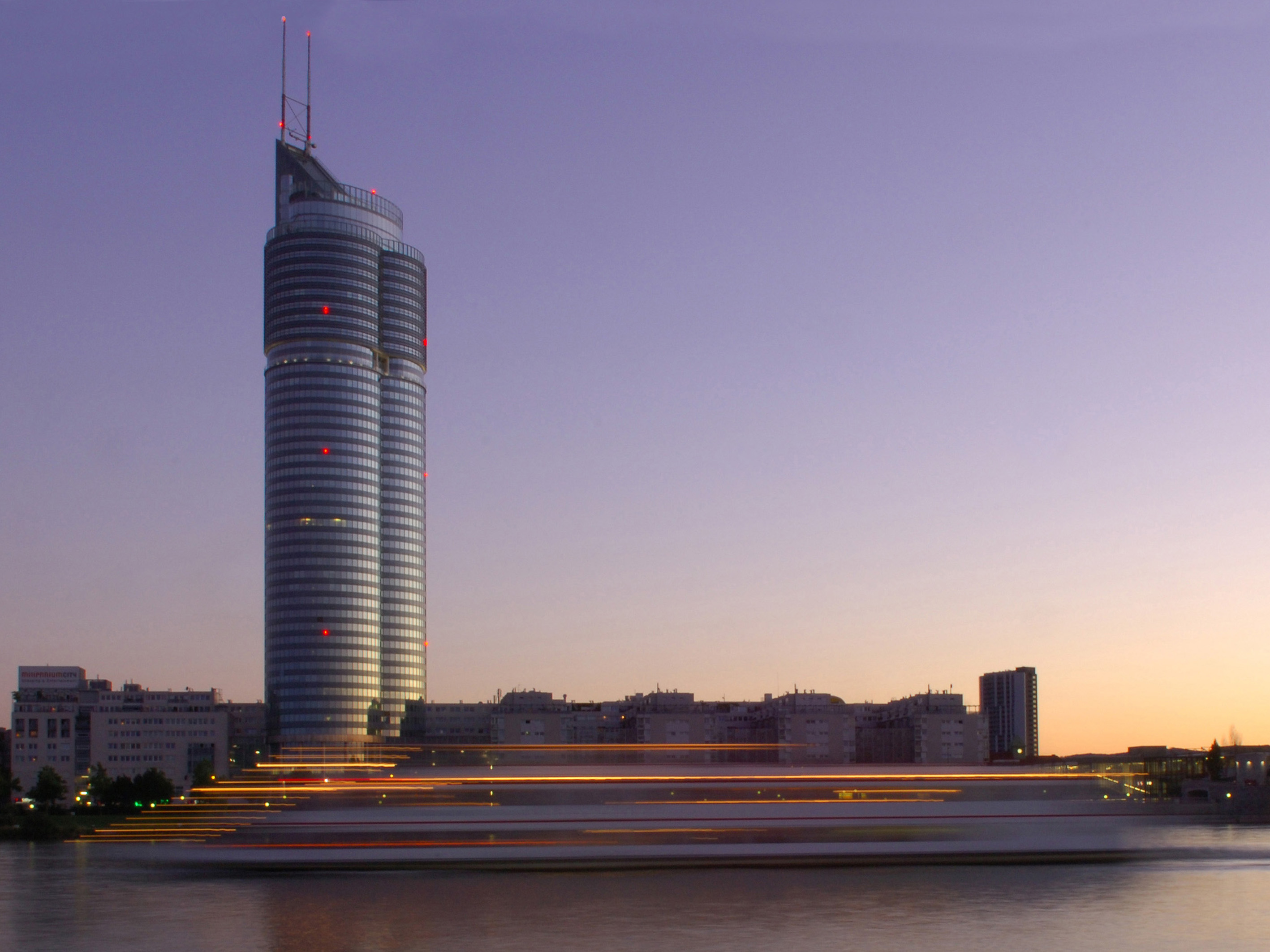
Millennium Tower, Vienna, Austria's highest office building at the time of its completion

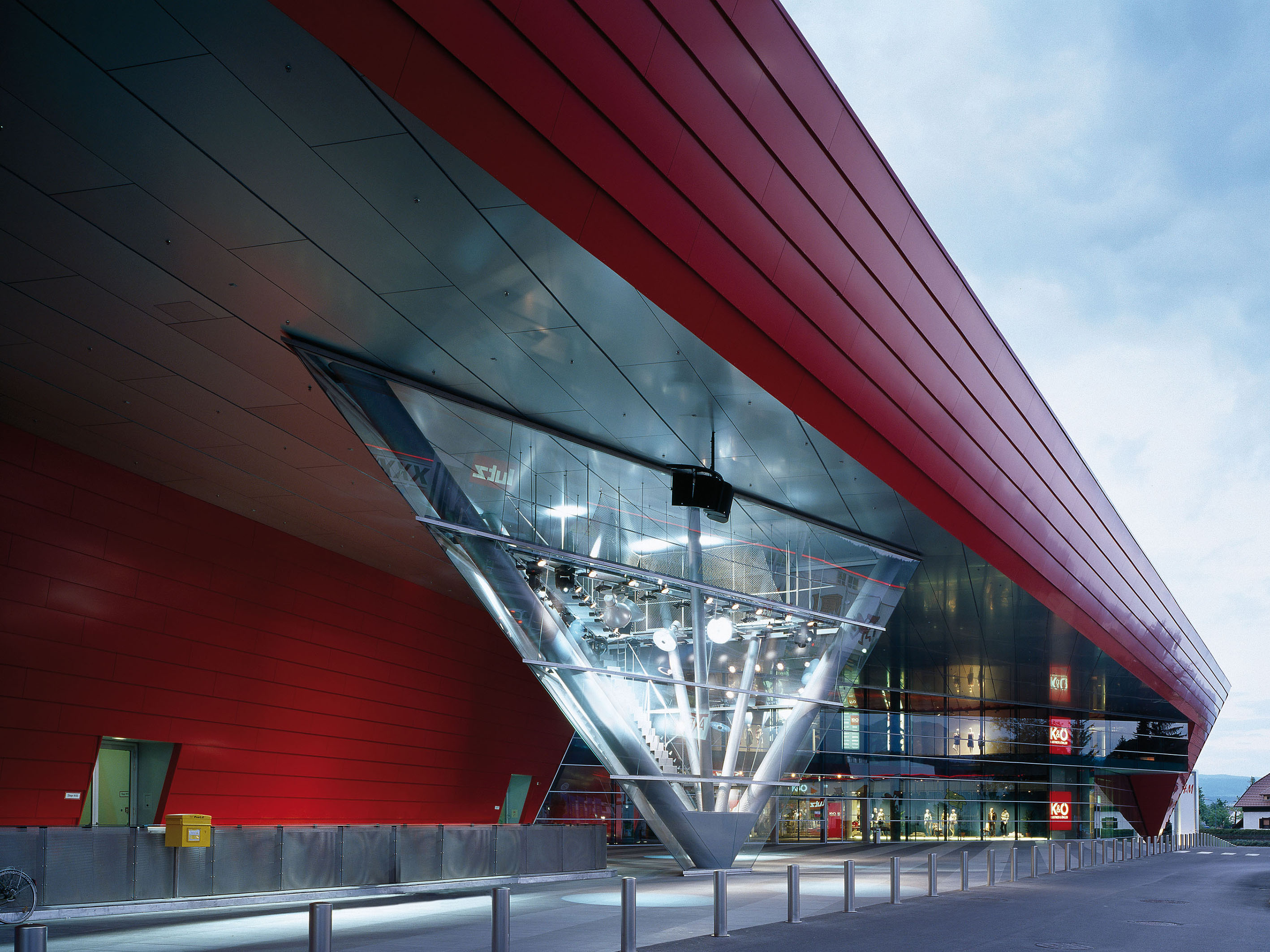
SES-Shoppingcenter ATRIO, Villach, 2007, The World's Most Sustainable Shopping Center, ICSC Best-of-the-Best-Award 2009

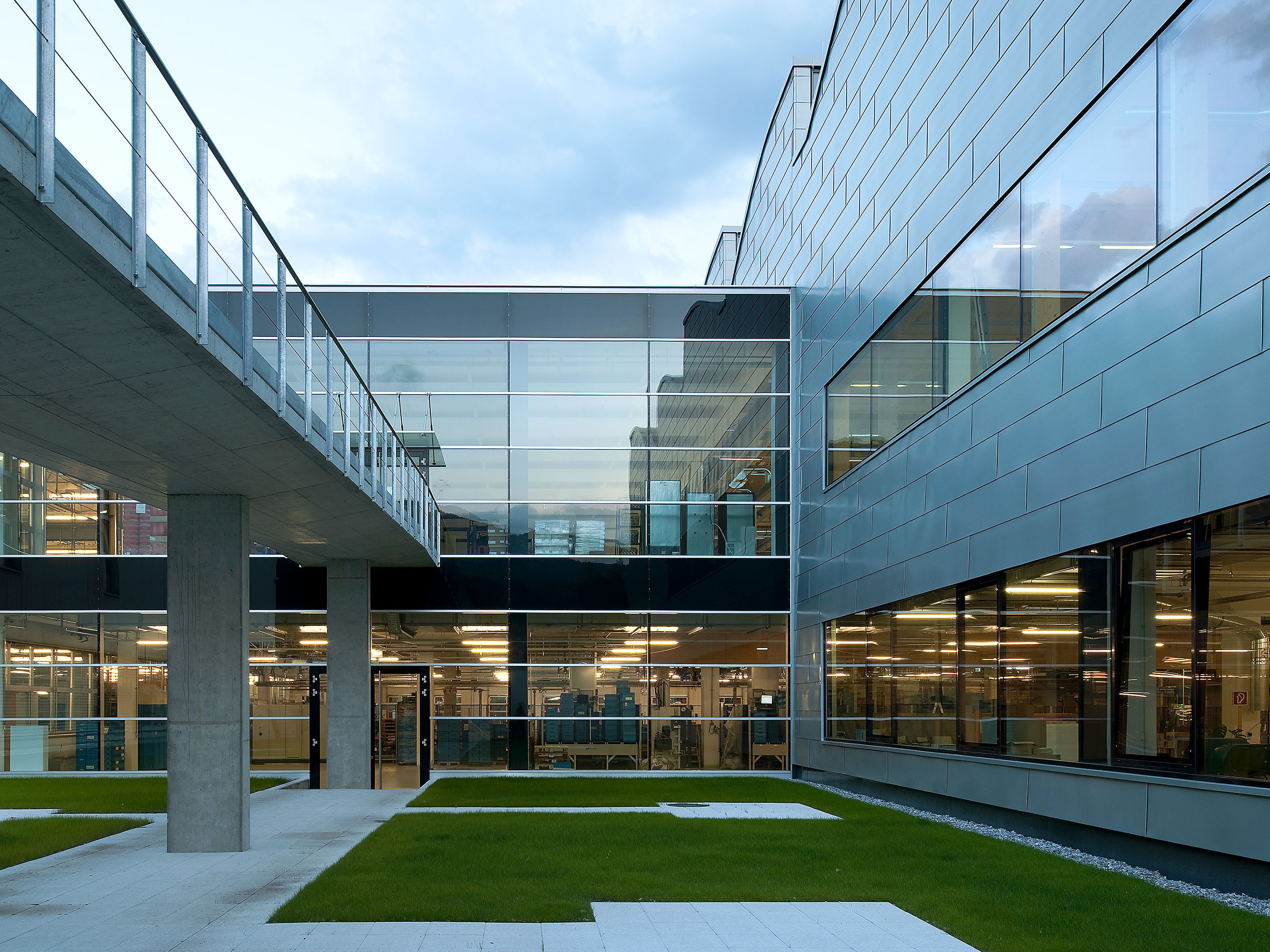
Hilti P4plus Production and Logistics Building, Thüringen/Vbg., Austria's first ÖGNI (silver) certified industrial building

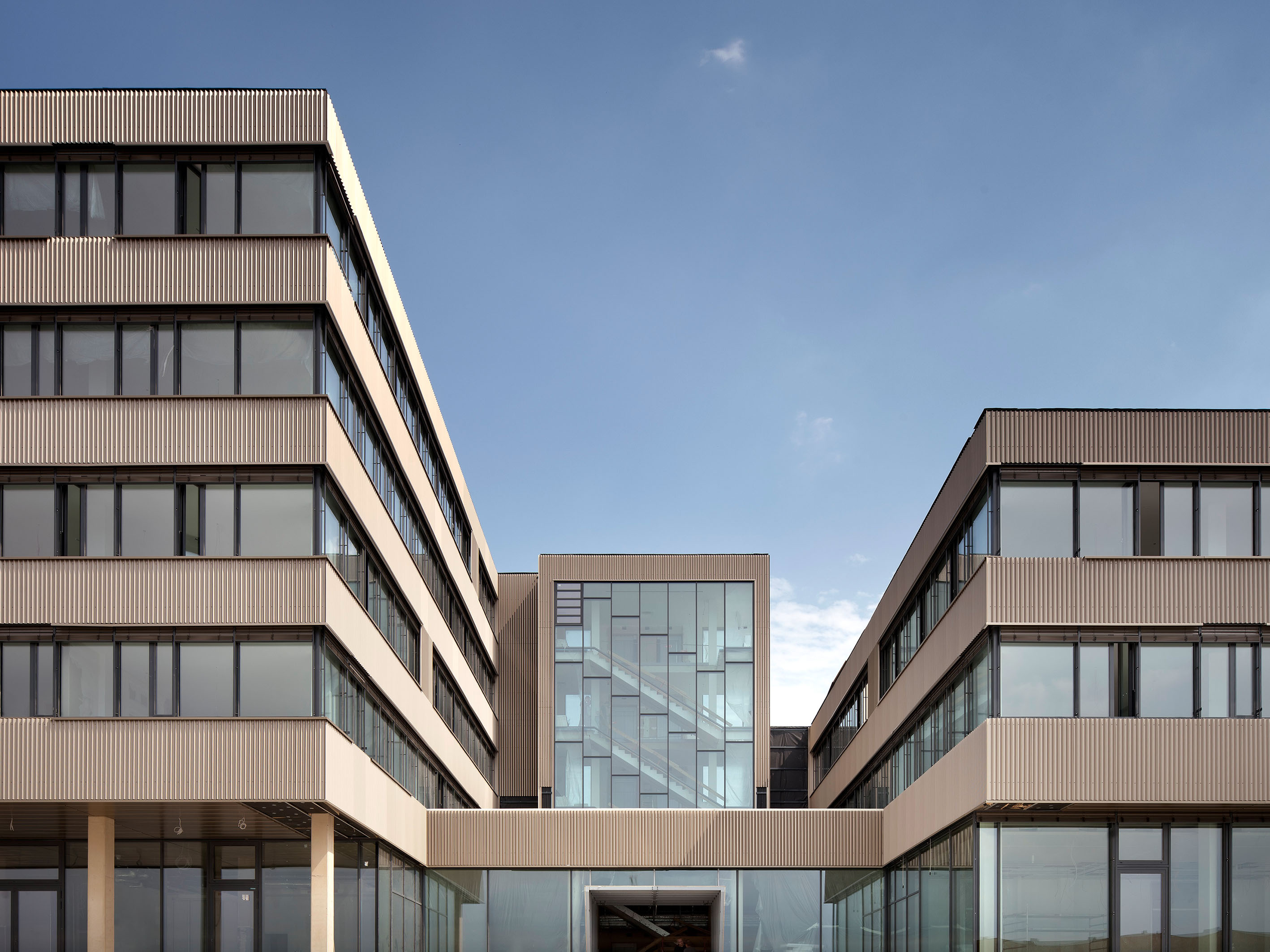
aspern IQ Technology Center, Vienna, Austria's first plus energy building

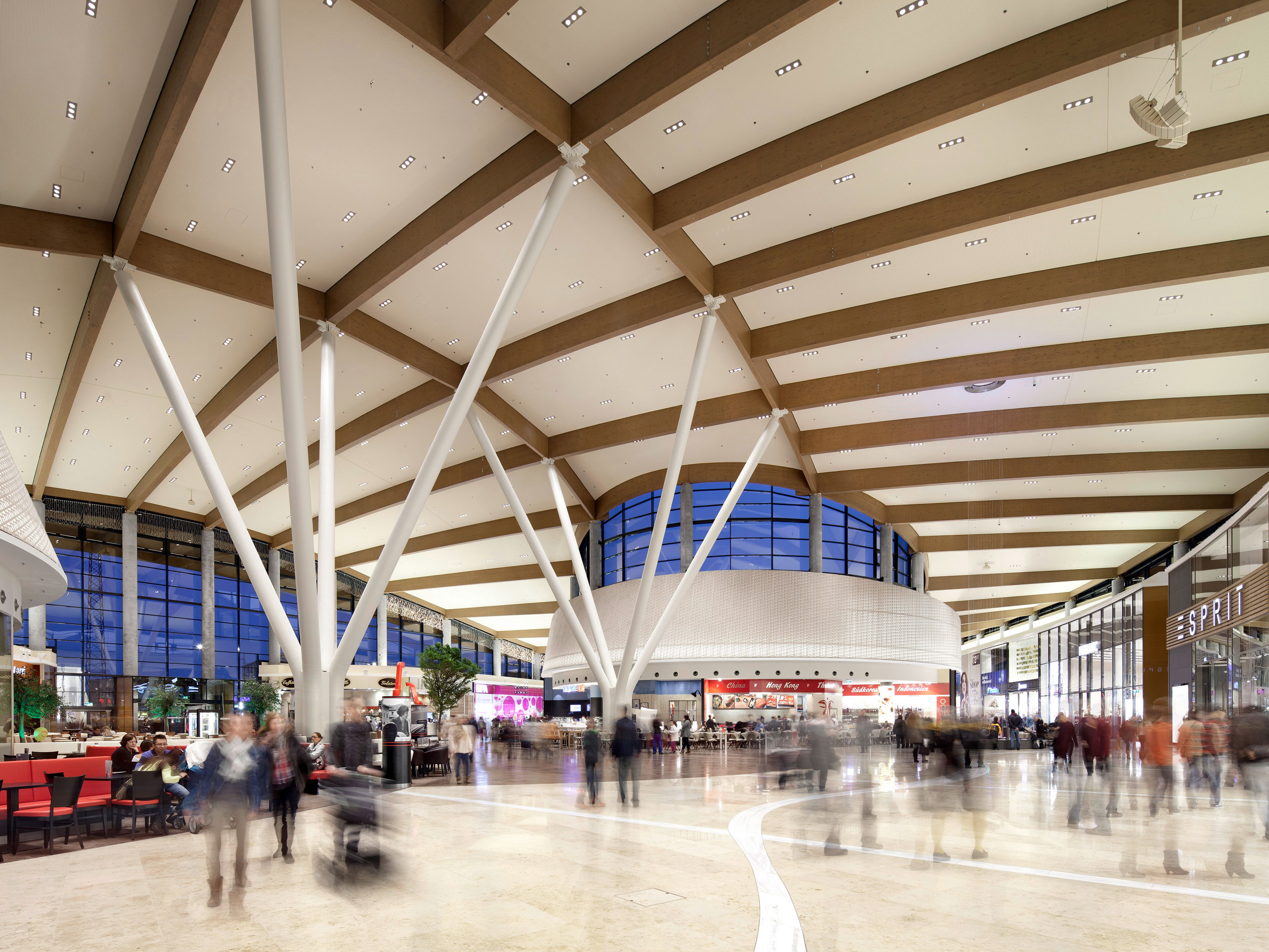
G3 Shopping Resort, Gerasdorf near Vienna

== Awards ==
Since 1990 ATP has won around 55 competitions and received prizes and awards for sustainable design and corporate social responsibility. 2014 ATP received gold in the category architecture and was named "Architect of the Year" at the 7th International Design Award in L.A., USA.

== Literature ==
- BIM – Aus der Praxis. Architektur Aktuell Special Issue, Sept. 2011 (pdf, atp.ag)
- ATP 04 - Neue Prozesse im Planen und Bauen. Springer Verlag, Vienna/ New York 2003, ISBN 3-211-00712-1.
- Literature by and about ATP in the catalogue of the German National Library
- Literature by and about ATP in the catalogue of the Austrian National Library
