= Meixner Schlüter Wendt Architekten =

German architecture company

- Company type: Privately held company (GmbH)
- Industry: architecture firm
- Founded: 1997; 29 years ago in Frankfurt, Hesse, Germany
- Headquarters: Frankfurt, Germany
- Area served: worldwide
- Key people: Claudia Meixner; Florian Schlüter; Marin Wendt
- Products: Architecture, Urban design
- Number of employees: ~50
- Website: www.meixner-schlueter-wendt.de

Meixner Schlüter Wendt Architekten (the company's preferred way of writing it is MEIXNER SCHLÜTER WENDT Architekten) is a German architecture firm based in Frankfurt. The company's projects have received awards the World Architecture Festival in 2008 and at the Venice Biennale of Architecture in 2004, 2006 and 2012.

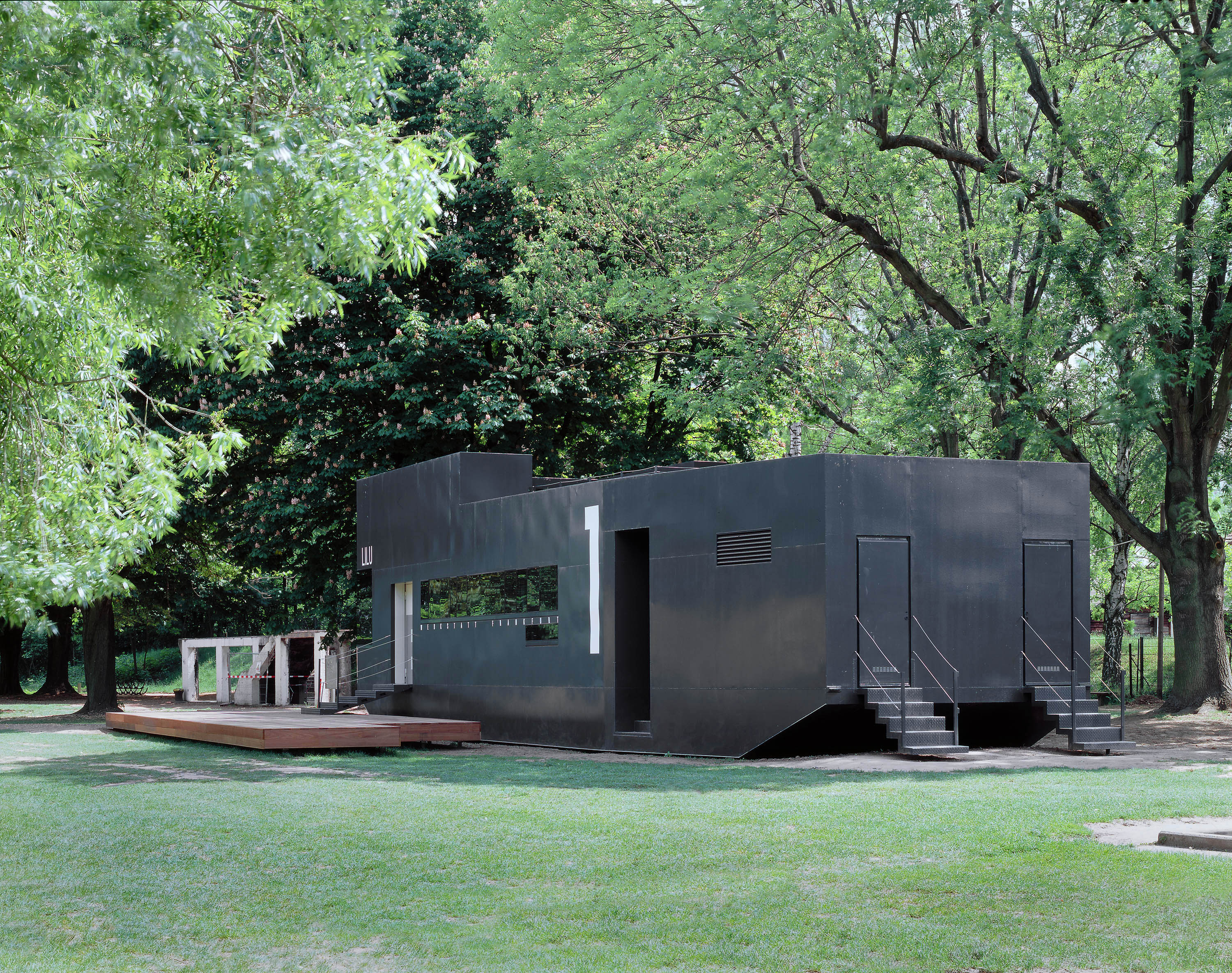
The Licht- und Luftbad pontoon, Niederrad, Frankfurt (2003).

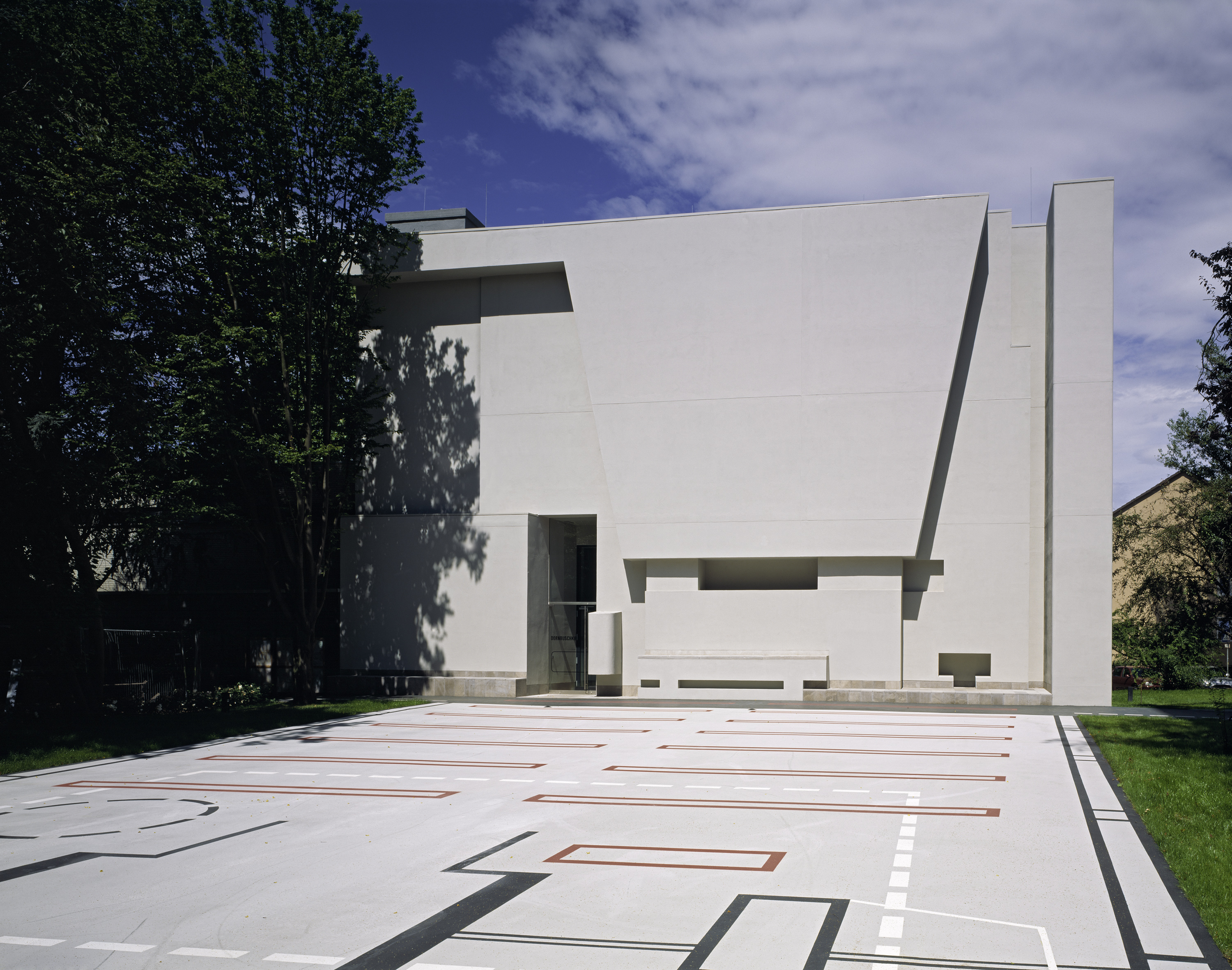
The relief wall in the Dornbusch Church in the eponymous district of Frankfurt (2006).

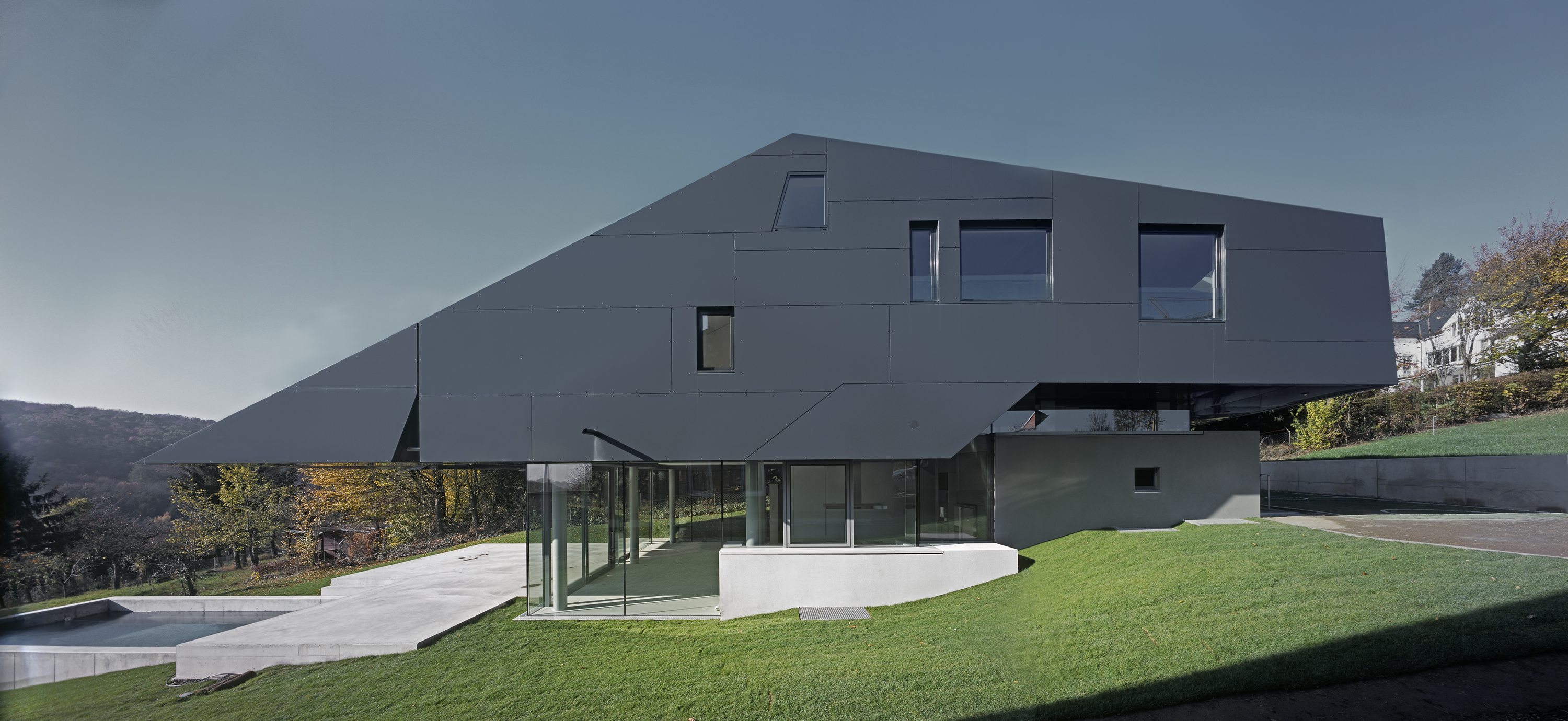
The top floor resembles a stealth bomber: "Wohnhaus F" residential building, Kronberg im Taunus (2007)

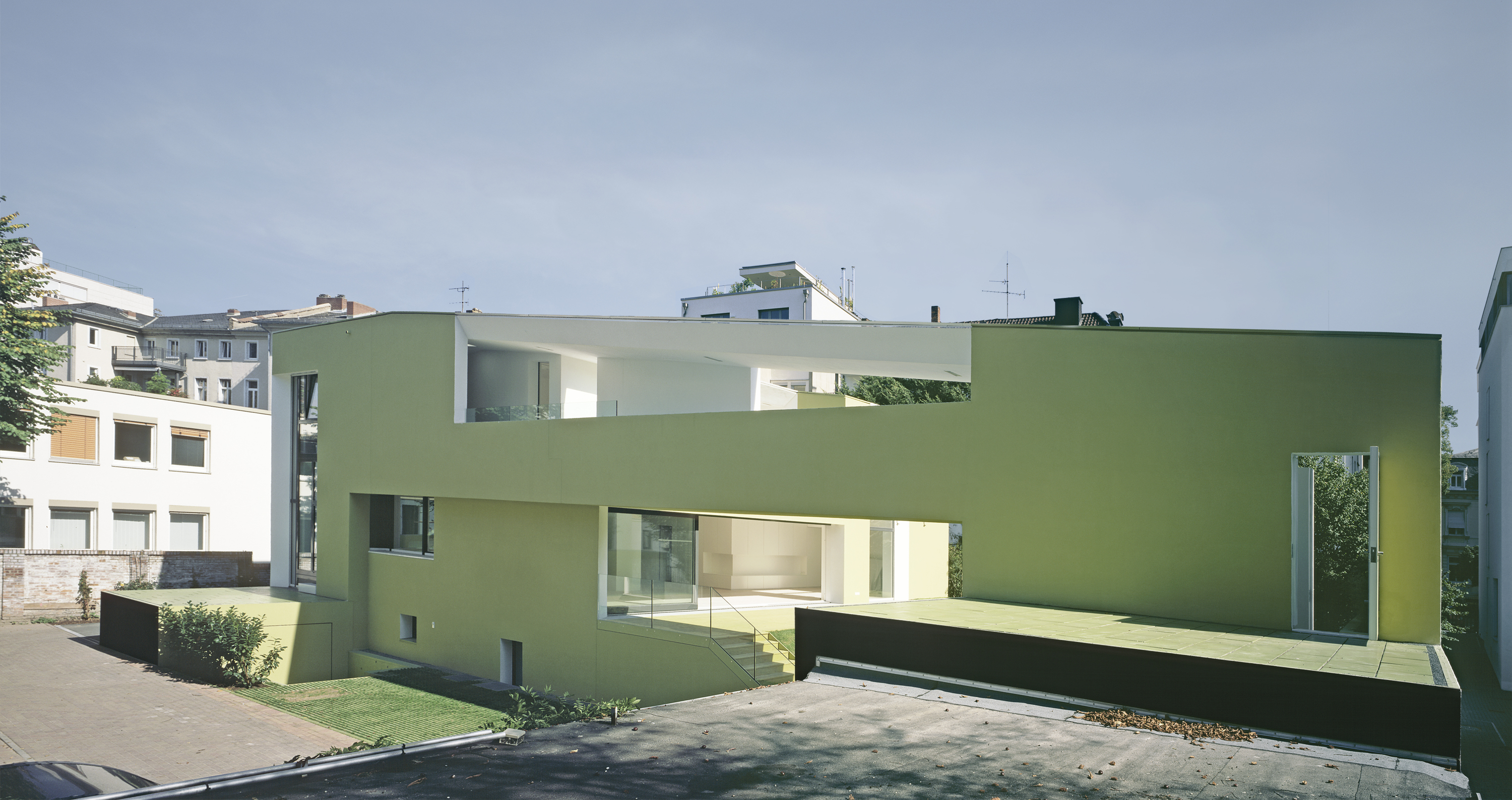
Schmuck residential building, Frankfurt: The "living room sculpture" (2011).

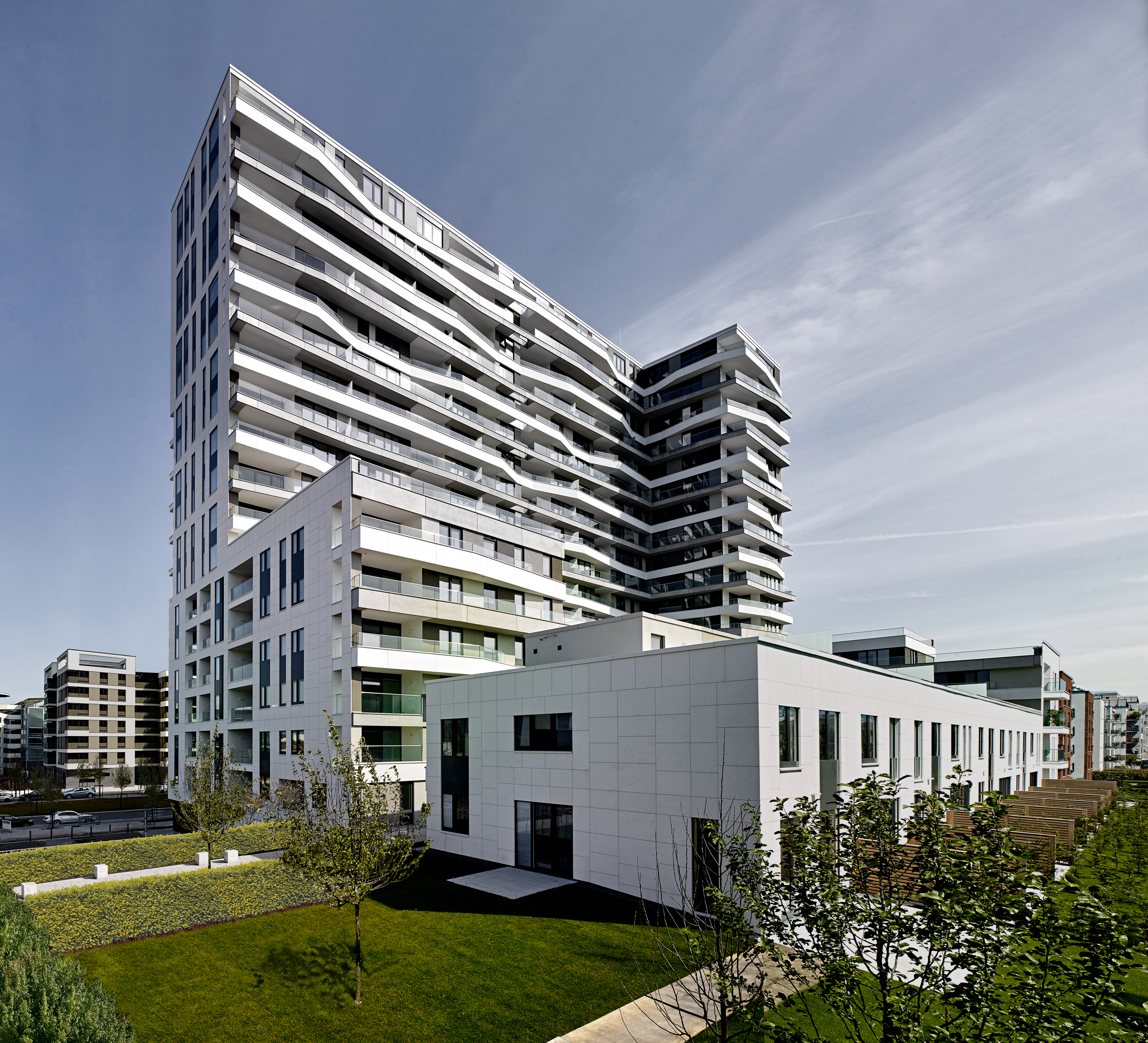
The composition of height in the Axis residential high-rise in Frankfurt's Europaviertel district – terraced house, perimeter block development, slim high-rise (2016).

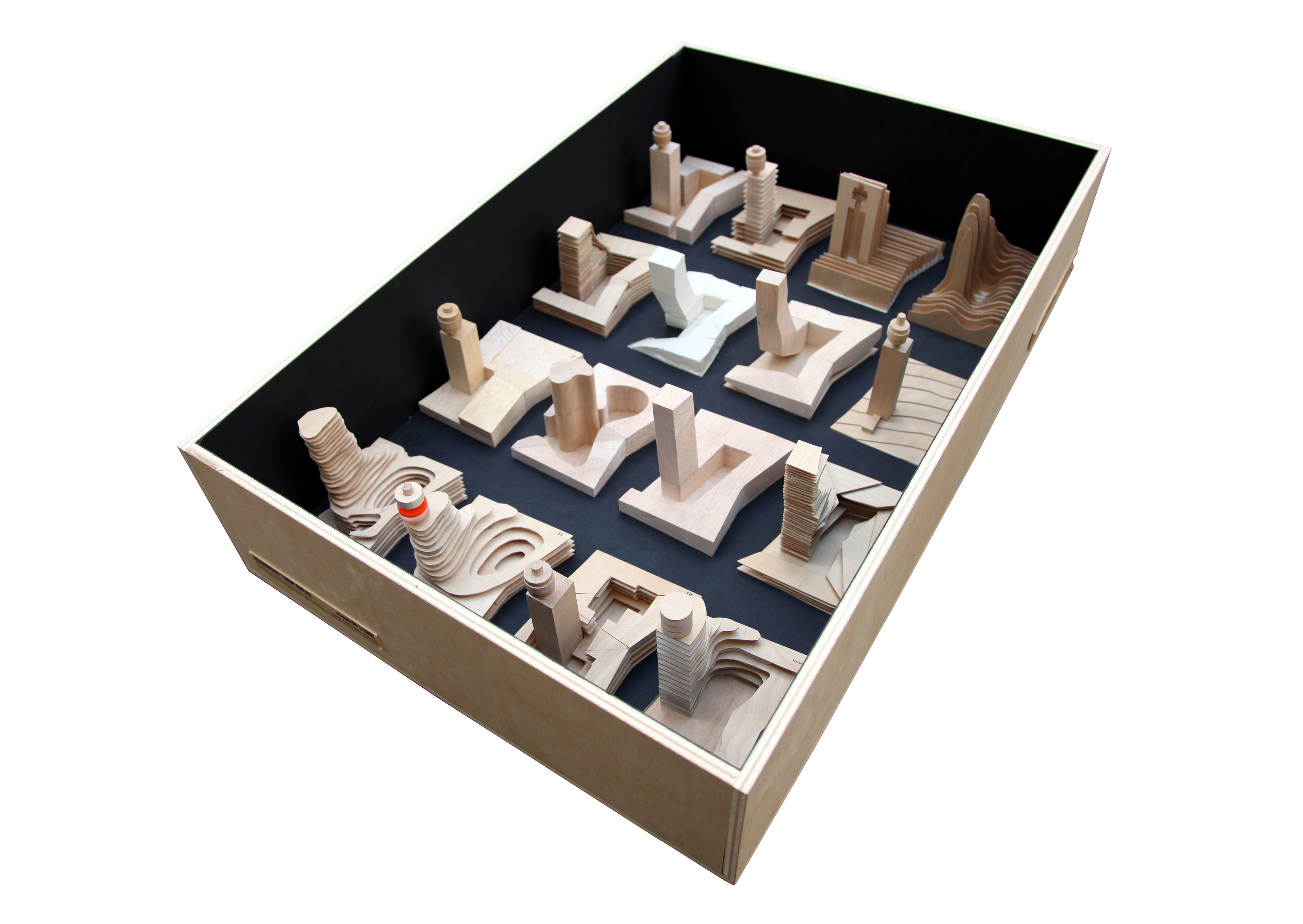
Models of possible versions of the new New Henninger Turm during the design process (2017).

== History ==
Since it was first founded in Frankfurt in 1997 the office has been managed by its three partners Claudia Meixner, Florian Schlüter and Martin Wendt. With its early, somewhat smaller projects the firm already elicited interest among the specialist media. Its later includes exhibition design, architectural planning and design in the urban context, industrial buildings, schools, churches, cultural and residential buildings, including residential high-rises. Claudia Meixner and Florian Schlüter hold lectures at various organizations and have also taught.

== Architecture ==
Diverse in formal terms, the buildings by Meixner Schlüter Wendt have two basic things in common: They leave a strong sculptural impression on viewers and they react to their contexts with sensitivity. Meixner Schlüter Wendt resolves this apparent conflict by using methods, principles, and strategies which are – according to design expert Lilli Hollein – established practice in the world of visual arts but, by contrast, rather unusual for German architecture firms. One common practice at the practice is to play with levels of perception. To this end, in their design process, the architects evoke specific associations with what is particular to a certain location and the relevant construction brief, associations which are the result of observing and analyzing everyday things or rather the way they are arranged. This can, for instance, include recourse to conventional building typologies and to well-known techniques from the history of construction, such as the kind of encrustations or reliefs which Meixner Schlüter Wendt sees as intellectual ready-mades, something which they can reinterpret and transform into buildings of a new kind.

== Buildings (selection) ==
- 2002–2003 "Wohnhaus S." residential building, Karlsruhe.
- 2003 Licht- und Luftbad snack bar pontoon, Niederrad, Frankfurt.
- 2004–2006 Dornbuschkirche, Frankfurt.
- 2005–2006 "Wohnhaus Wohlfahrt-Laymann" residential building, Oberursel (Taunus).
- 2005–2007 "Wohnhaus F" residential building, Kronberg im Taunus.
- 2006–2009 Ordnungsamt (public order office), Frankfurt.
- 2009–2011 "Wohnhaus Schmuck" residential building, Frankfurt.
- 2010 Leseraum/Ding reading room in the Museum für Moderne Kunst; Frankfurt.
- 2010–2012 "Dock 2.0" office building, Frankfurt.
- 2012 "Schirnstudio 2.0", Schirn Kunsthalle, Frankfurt.
- 2012–2016 "Axis" residential high-rise, Frankfurt.
- 2012–2017 New Henninger Turm, Frankfurt.
- 2015–2017 Evangelische Akademie Frankfurt, Frankfurt.

== Awards (selection) ==
- 1988 Schinkelpreis, Kunst und Bauen, 1st prize
- 1995 Villa Massimo Award, Rome, Architecture
- 2003 Deutscher Architekturpreis, recognition for new Licht und Luftbad snack bar pontoon
- 2006 Wüstenrot-Stiftung's design prize "Umbau im Bestand" (conversion work on existing buildings), 1st prize, Dornbuschkirche
- 2008 World Architecture Festival, Award Winner in the category "Religion and Contemplation", Dornbuschkirche
- 2012 ECOLA Award, European Conference for Leading Architects, Schmuck residential building, 1st prize for CO_{2}-optimized renovation, refurbishment, conversion work
- 2012 Chicago Athenaeum, International Architecture Award, prize for the Schmuck residential building
- 2017 FIABCI Prix d'Excellence 2017 Germany, category residential for the Axis residential high-rise

== Useful links ==
- Official website
- "Meixner Schlüter Wendt Architekten BDA". at archINFORM
- Meixner Schlüter Wendt Architekten at BauNetz
