= Swissmill Tower =

Tall grain silo in Zürich, Switzerland

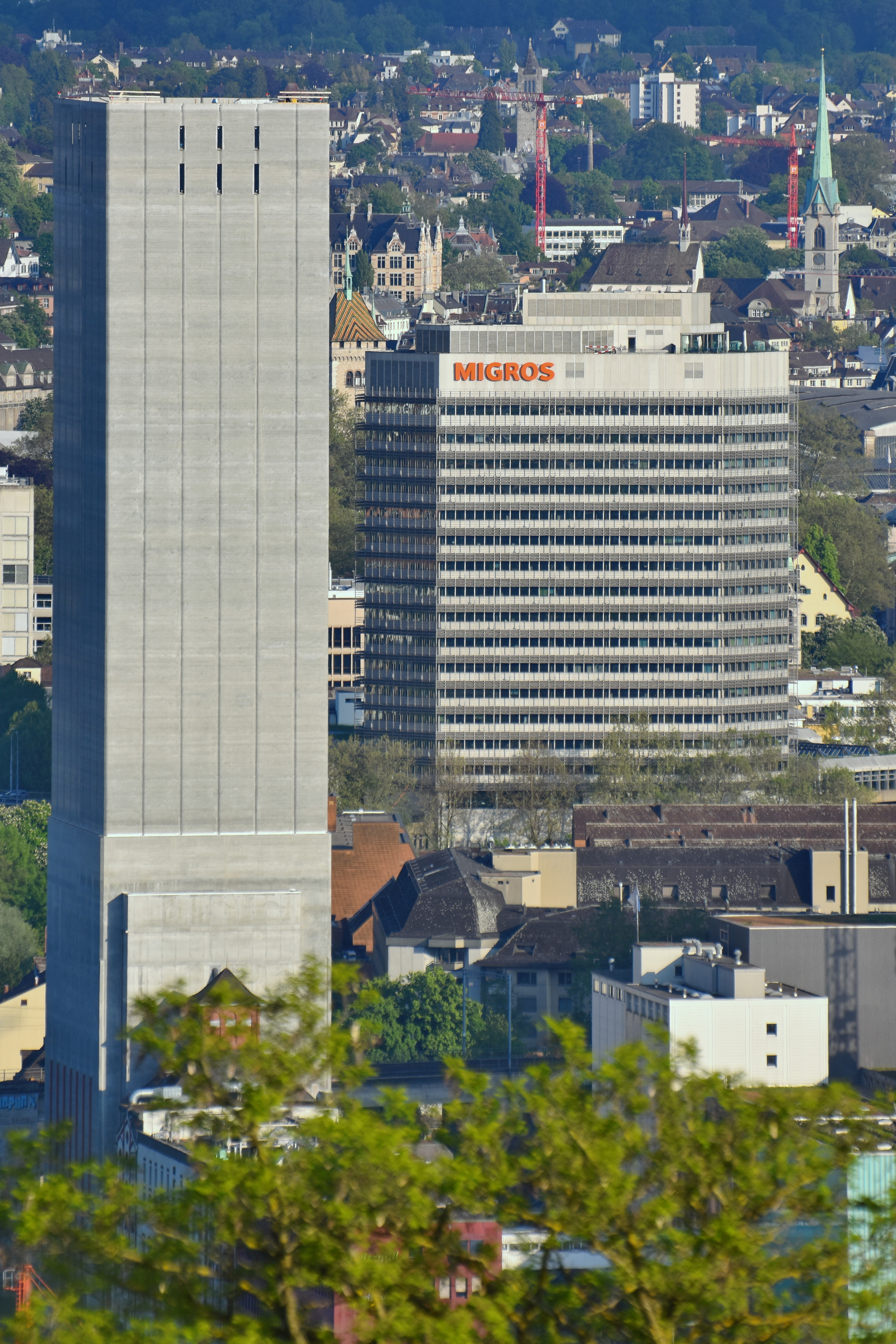
- Swissmill Tower and Migros building as seen from Käferberg
- Interactive map of the Swissmill Tower area

General information
- Type: Grain elevator
- Location: Zürich-Hard, Canton of Zürich, Switzerland
- Coordinates: 47.389628°N 8.527086°E
- Construction started: May 2013
- Completed: April 2016
- Owner: Coop Schweiz

Height
- Roof: 118 metres (387 ft)

Design and construction
- Architects: Harder Haas Partner Architekten, Eglisau
- Main contractor: Implenia

The Swissmill Tower, also known as Kornhaus, is the tallest operating grain elevator in the world. Standing at 118 metres (387 ft), it is the second-tallest building in the Swiss city of Zürich.

== History and description ==
The Swissmill Tower is a grain elevator close to Limmatplatz in Zürich. It was built near the Migros Tower, replacing a former grain elevator after the city voted in favor of building a larger silo. The original mill (Kornhaus) was built in 1843 on the same site.

The site required piles built to a depth of 45 metres (148 ft) in the bedrock of the Limmat Valley. The increase of its height to 118 metres (387 ft) was done by slipforming. This required as many as 60 construction workers processing concrete in three shifts around the clock. The construction took place in two stages. The first phase was completed in early July 2015. The second began in September 2015, and end in April 2016. Mill operations continued during construction. The works were carried out by Implenia.

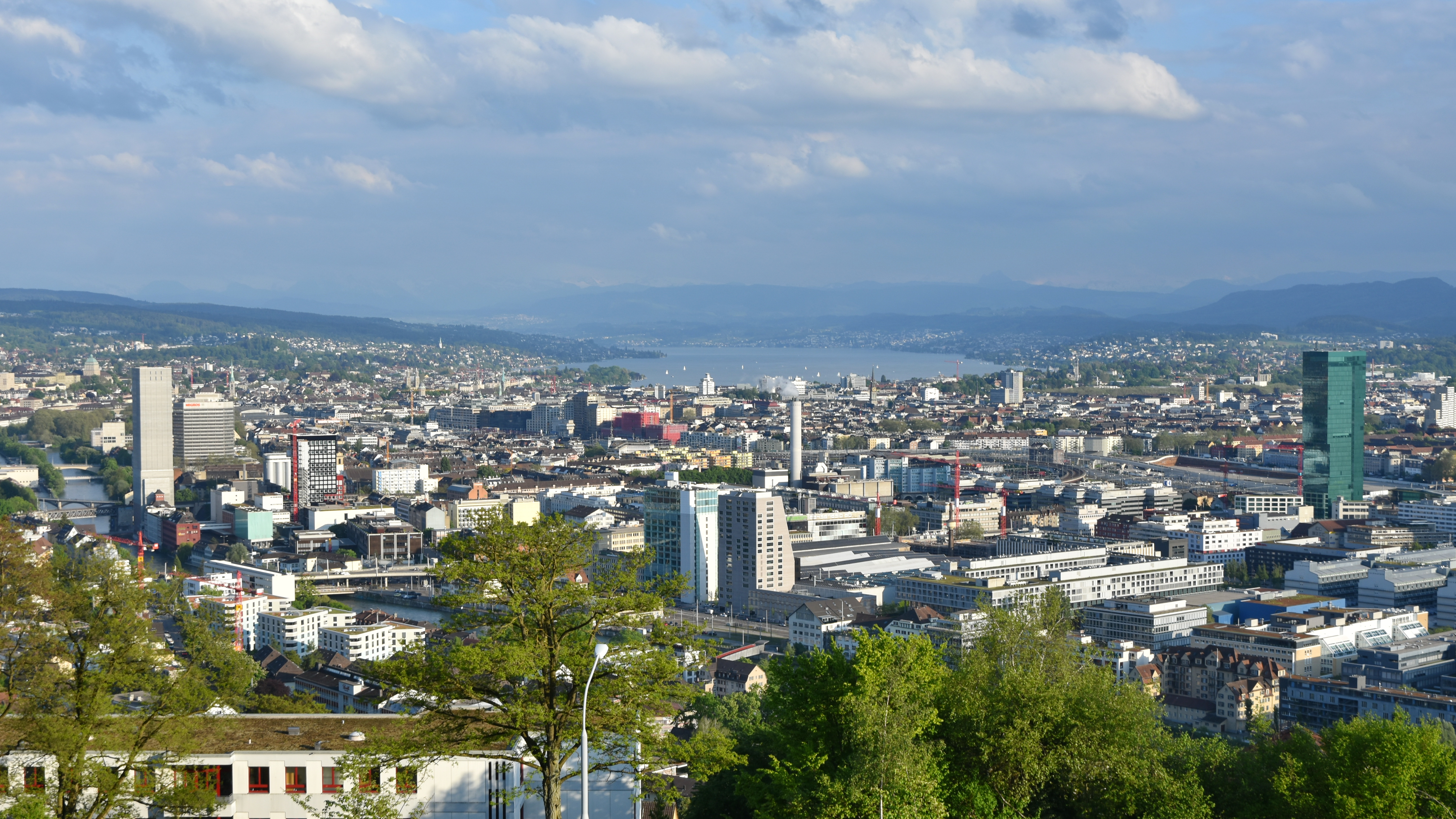
Location of the Swissmill Tower in the upper Limmat Valley as seen from Käferberg

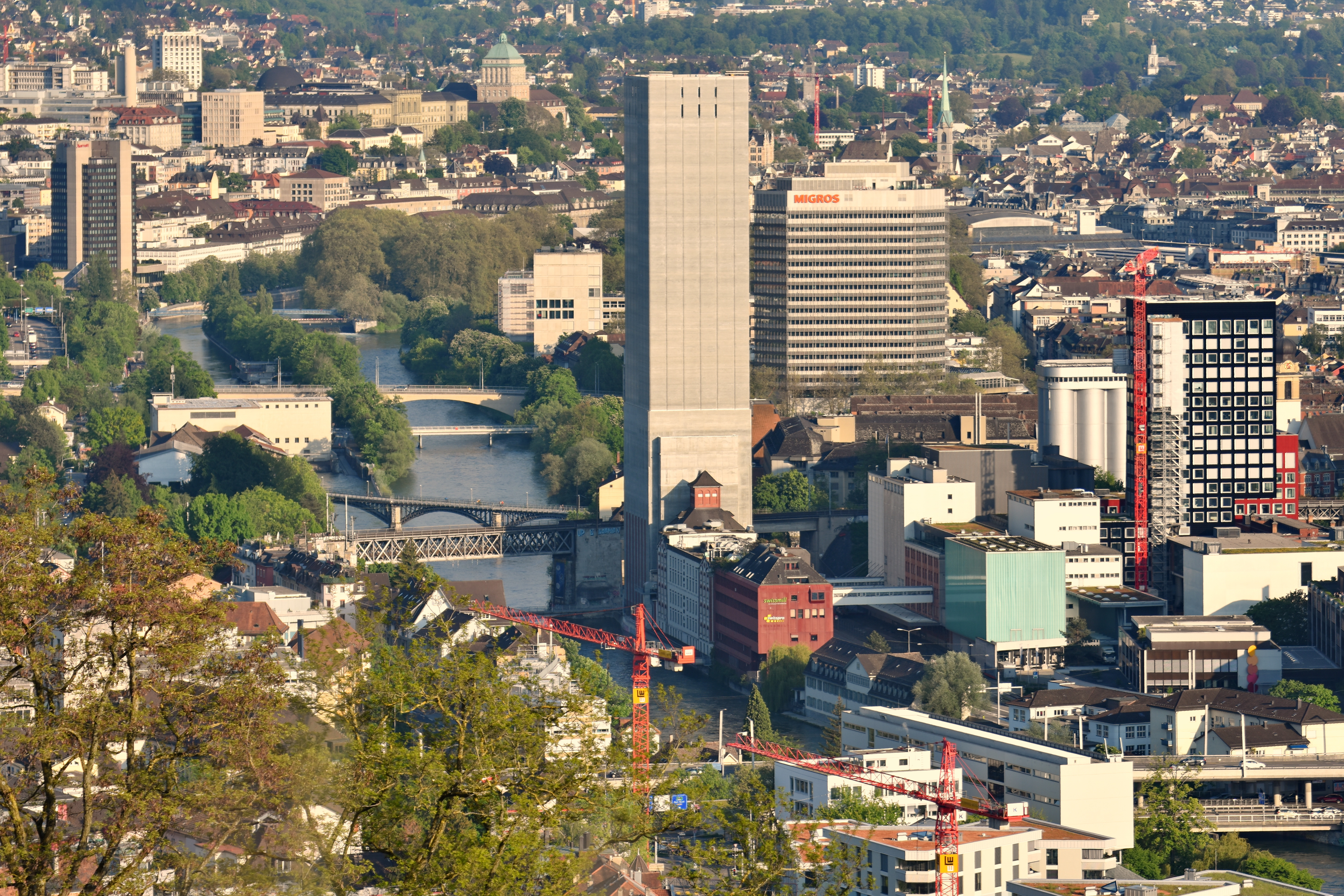

== Significance ==
At 118 metres (387 ft), the Swissmill Tower is the tallest operating grain elevator in the world. The second tallest, the Schapfen Mill Tower in Ulm, Germany, is 115 metres (377 ft) tall excluding the antenna. The tallest grain elevator ever constructed, the Henninger Turm, stood 120 metres (394 ft) and was demolished in 2013.

The Swissmill Tower can store 40,000 tonnes of grain. Swissmill is the largest mill company in Switzerland, processing 800 tons of grain daily. This represents 30% of the Swiss national grain requirements. It supplies flour for Swiss retailers Coop, Volg and Landi.

Critics have said the silo's exterior and height are overly industrial. However, municipal authorities say that the silo was intentionally designed in that way. Its external appearance is intended to express its interior – an industrial plant.

In July 2016, there was a proposal to cover the tower's exterior with plants, in response to a request by Zürich politicians to redo the facade. Architect Miriam Vázquez suggested this during the planning phase, but later deemed it too expensive.
