= Schapfen Mill Tower =

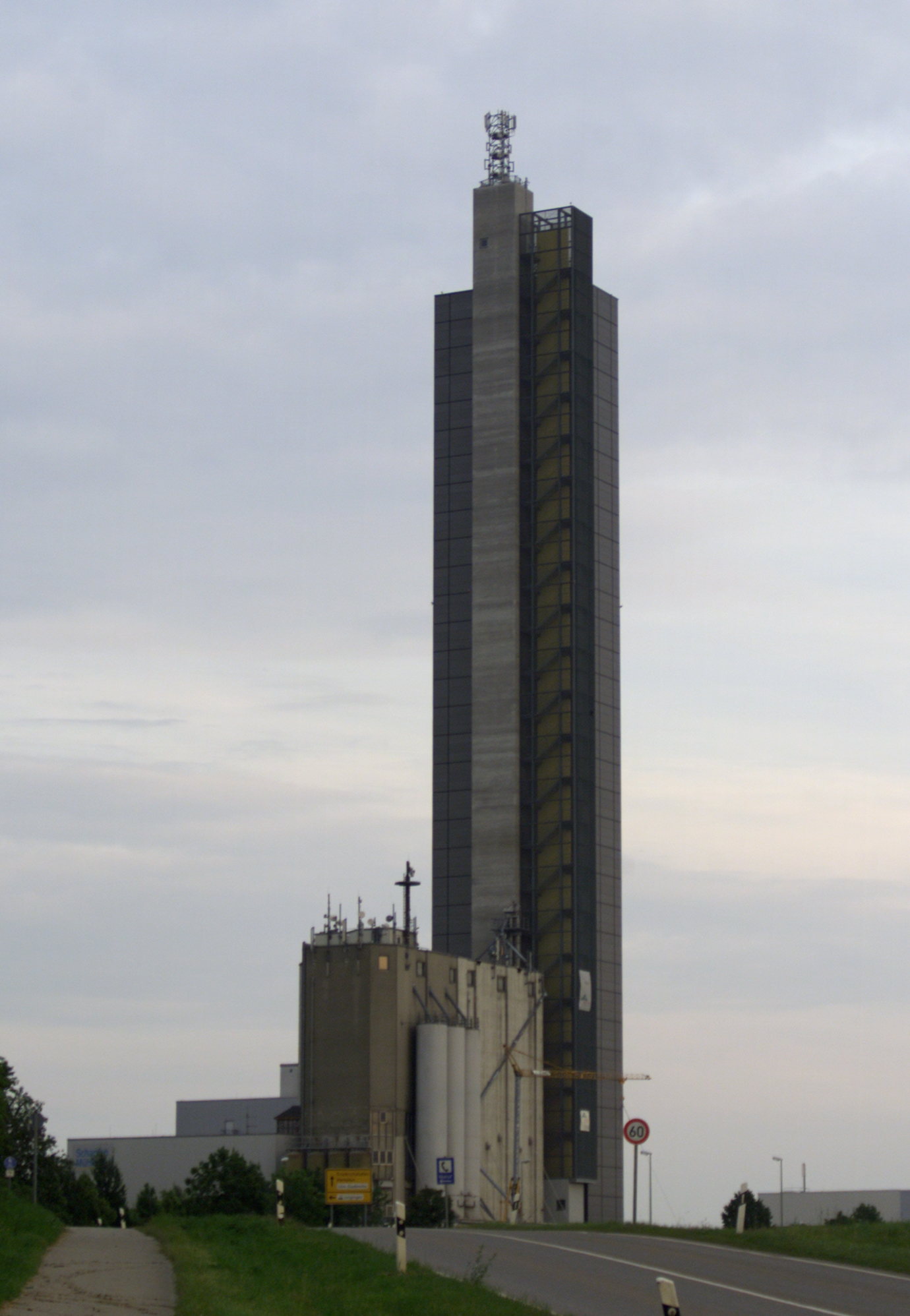
- Northwest view of the silo
- Interactive map of the Schapfen Mill Tower area

General information
- Type: Grain elevator
- Coordinates: 48°25′57″N 9°58′58″E
- Construction started: June 2004
- Completed: January 2005
- Cost: 6.24 million Euro

Height
- Antenna spire: 125 m (410 ft)
- Roof: 116 m (381 ft)

The Schapfen-Mill-Tower is a 115-metre-tall (377 ft) silo tower near Ulm, Germany. Construction began in 2004 and was completed in 2005. It held the title of the tallest operational grain elevator following the demolition of Henninger Turm in 2013, until it was surpassed in 2016 by the completion of the Swissmill Tower in Zürich, Switzerland.

Inside the tower, there are 30 cells that can store about 8,000 metric tons of grain. The intake capacity is 120 tonnes per hour. The facade on the south side is equipped with a photovoltaic system consisting of 1300 CIS solar modules, which produces about 70,000 kWh of electricity annually. However, due to the vertical mounting, the system yields only about 70 percent of the theoretically possible yield.
