= Integrated design =

Comprehensive holistic approach to design

Integrated design is a comprehensive holistic approach to design which brings together specialisms usually considered separately. It attempts to take into consideration all the factors and modulations necessary to a decision-making process. A few examples are the following:

- Design of a building which considers whole building design including architecture, structural engineering, passive solar building design and HVAC. The approach may also integrate building lifecycle management and a greater consideration of the end users of the building. The aim of integrated building design is often to produce sustainable architecture.
- Design of both a product (or family of products) and the assembly system that will produce it.
- Design of an electronic product that considers both hardware and software aspects, although this is often called co-design (not to be confused with participatory design, which is also often called co-design).

The requirement for integrated design comes when the different specialisms are dependent on each other or "coupled". An alternative or complementary approach to integrated design is to consciously reduce the dependencies. In computing and systems design, this approach is known as loose coupling.

== Dis-integrated design ==
Three phenomena are associated with a lack of integrated design:

- Silent design: design by default, by omission or by people not aware that they are participating in design activity.
- Partial design: design is only used to a limited degree, such as in superficial styling, often after the important design decisions have been made.
- Disparate design: design activity may be widespread, but is not co-ordinated or brought together to realise its potential. The resulting design may have needless complexity, internal inconsistency, logical flaws and a lack of a unifying vision.

A committee is sometimes a deliberate attempt to address disparate design, but the phrase "design by committee" is associated with this failing, leading to disparate design. "Design by committee" can also lead to a kind of silent design, as design decisions are not properly considered, for fear of upsetting a hard-won compromise.

== Methods for integrated design ==
The integrated design approach incorporates collaborative methods and tools to encourage and enable the specialists in the different areas to work together to produce an integrated design.

A charrette provides opportunity for all specialists to collaborate and align early in the design process.

Human-Centered Design provides an integrated approach to problem solving, commonly used in design and management frameworks that develops solutions to problems by involving the human perspective in all steps of the problem-solving process.

== See also ==
- Holism
- Mode 2
- Participatory design
- System integration
- Systems engineering
