= Henninger Turm =

Skyscraper in Frankfurt

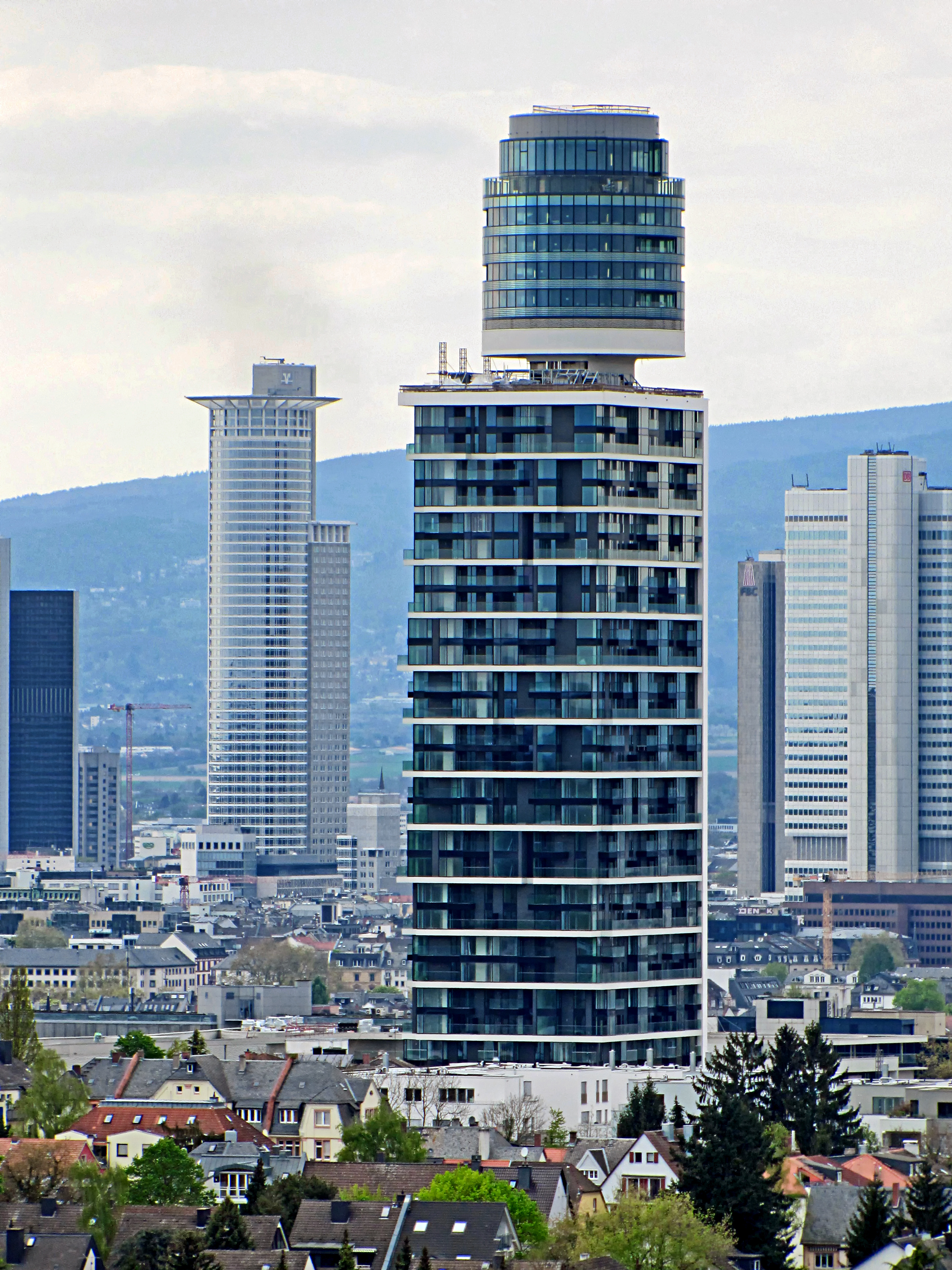
- The new Henninger-Turm in 2017
- Interactive map of the Henninger Turm area

General information
- Type: Grain silo (old); Residential (new)
- Architectural style: Modernism
- Location: Hainer Weg 60; Frankfurt; Hesse, Germany
- Coordinates: 50°05′50″N 8°41′36″E
- Construction started: 1959 (Old); 2014–15 (New)
- Completed: 1961 (Old); 2016 (New)
- Demolished: 2013 (Old)
- Owner: Henninger-Bräu AG (old); Actris Henninger Turm GmbH & Co KG (new)

Height
- Antenna spire: 120 m (390 ft)
- Roof: 110 m (360 ft)
- Top floor: 107 m (351 ft)

Technical details
- Floor count: 33
- Lifts/elevators: 2

Design and construction
- Architects: Karl Lieser (old); Meixner Schlüter Wendt (new)
- Known for: Revolving restaurant; Rund um den Henninger-Turm (cycling race 1961–2008)

Henninger Turm (Henninger Tower) was a grain storage silo located in the Sachsenhausen-Süd district of Frankfurt, Germany. It was built by Henninger Brewery (now part of the Binding Brewery/Radeberger Group) and had a storage capacity of 16,000 tons of barley. The 120-metre (390 ft), 33-storey, reinforced concrete tower was designed by Karl Lieser and was built from 1959 to 1961. It was inaugurated on 18 May 1961.

On top of the building was a barrel-like pod which contained a viewing platform and a revolving restaurant (originally two). In October 2002, the tower was closed to the public. From 1961 to 2008, the annual professional cycling race Rund um den Henninger-Turm was held on 1 May, the course circling the tower multiple times.

The silo and brewery campus was purchased and in 2017 was launched as residential estate with 150 high-rise apartments. The is among the tallest residential high-rises in Germany.

== Neuer Henninger Turm ==
In November 2012, it was announced that Henninger Turm would be demolished because it was too costly and uneconomic for renovation. Demolition began in January 2013 and was completed by the end of the year. On its site a new 140-metre-tall (460 ft) residential tower was built. Being inspired by the former Henninger Turm, the design was conceived by the architects Meixner Schlüter Wendt. Whereas both the contours and the side facing the city are strongly reminiscent of the original appearance of the old silo, the three other sides clearly indicate the new building's function as a residential tower. It contains 209 luxury apartments. The cornerstone for this project was laid in June 2014 and the tower was completed in summer 2017.

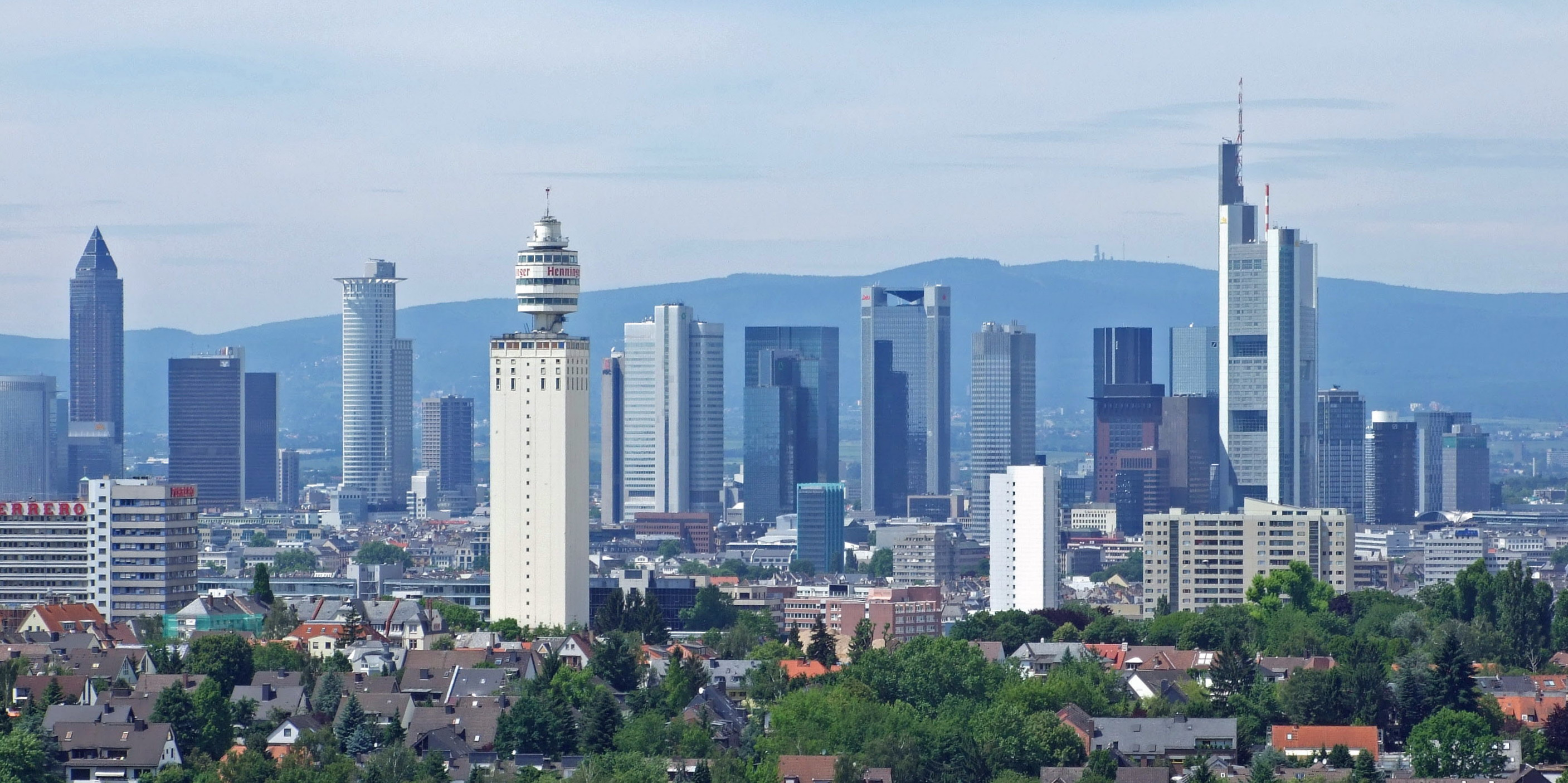
Skyline of Frankfurt with the Henninger-Turm

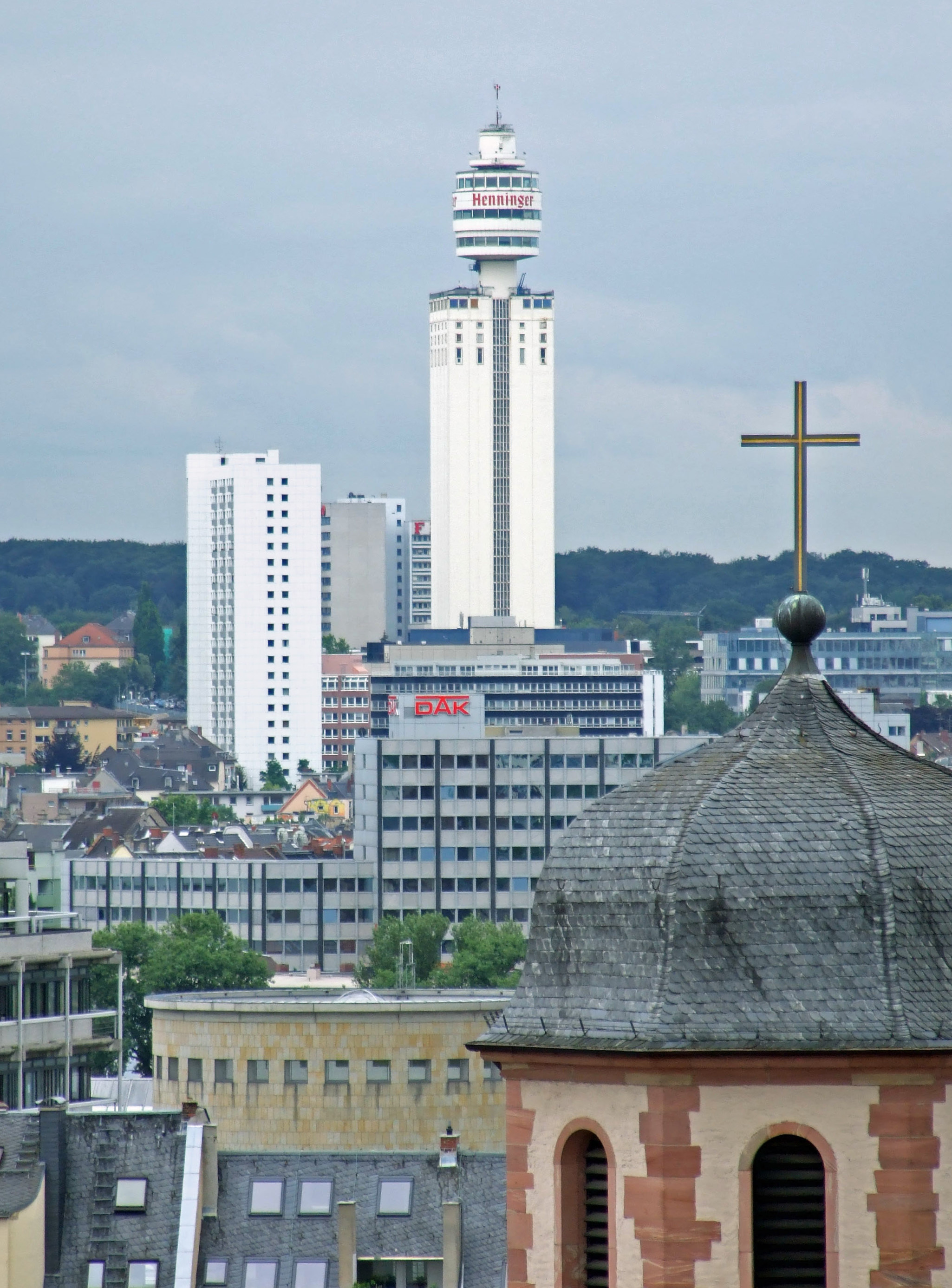

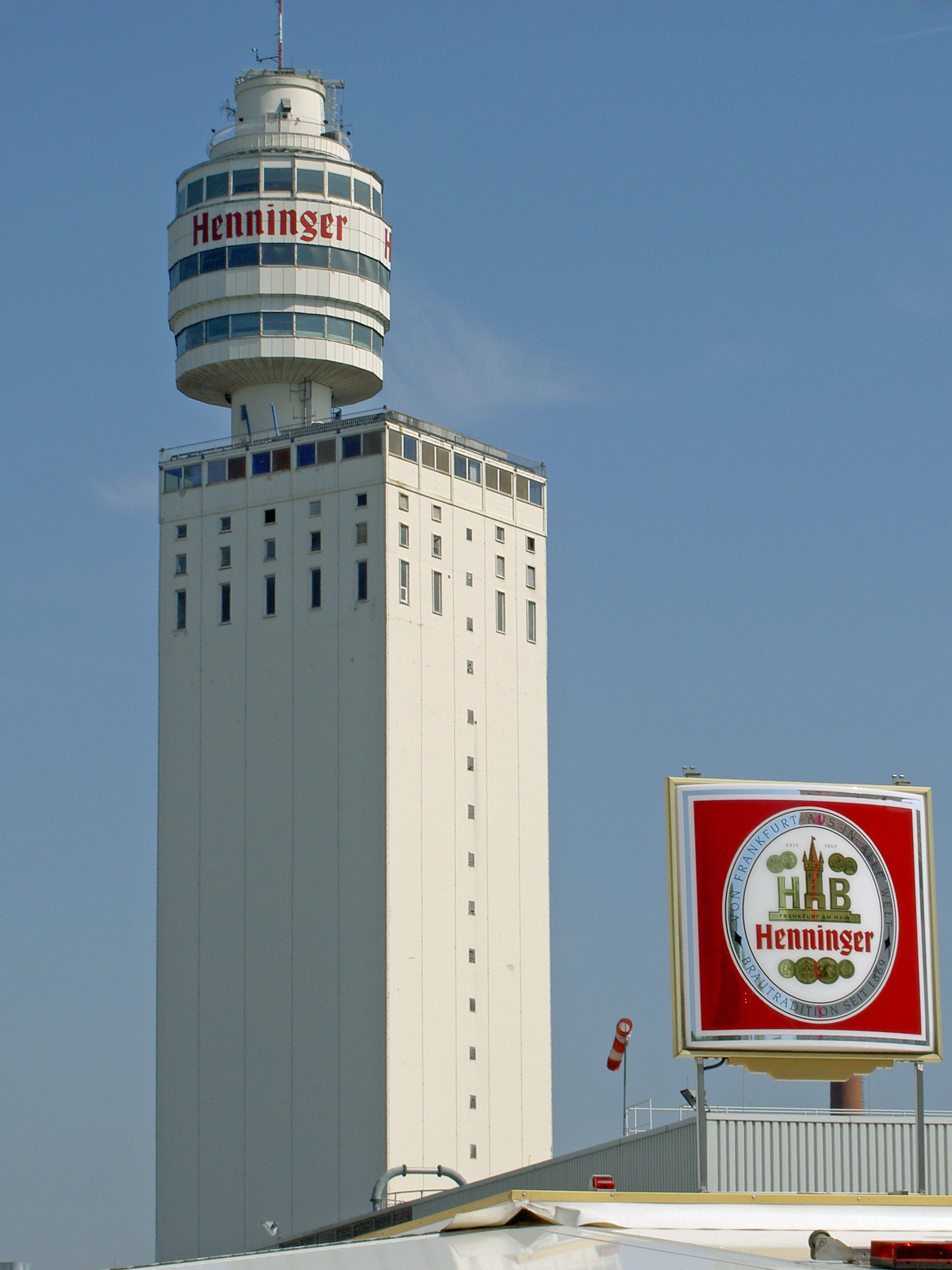
Henninger Turm 2005

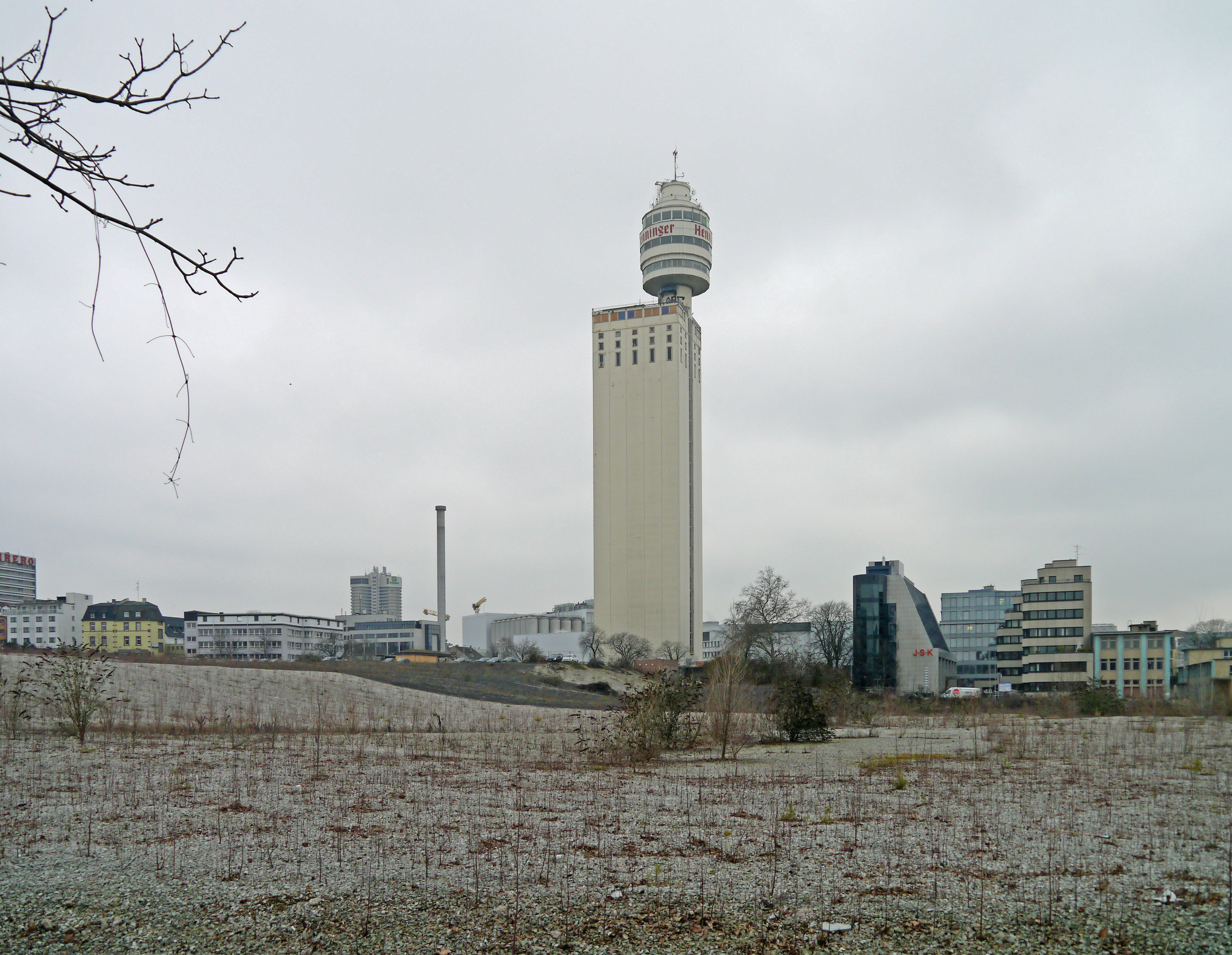
Henninger-Turm 2013

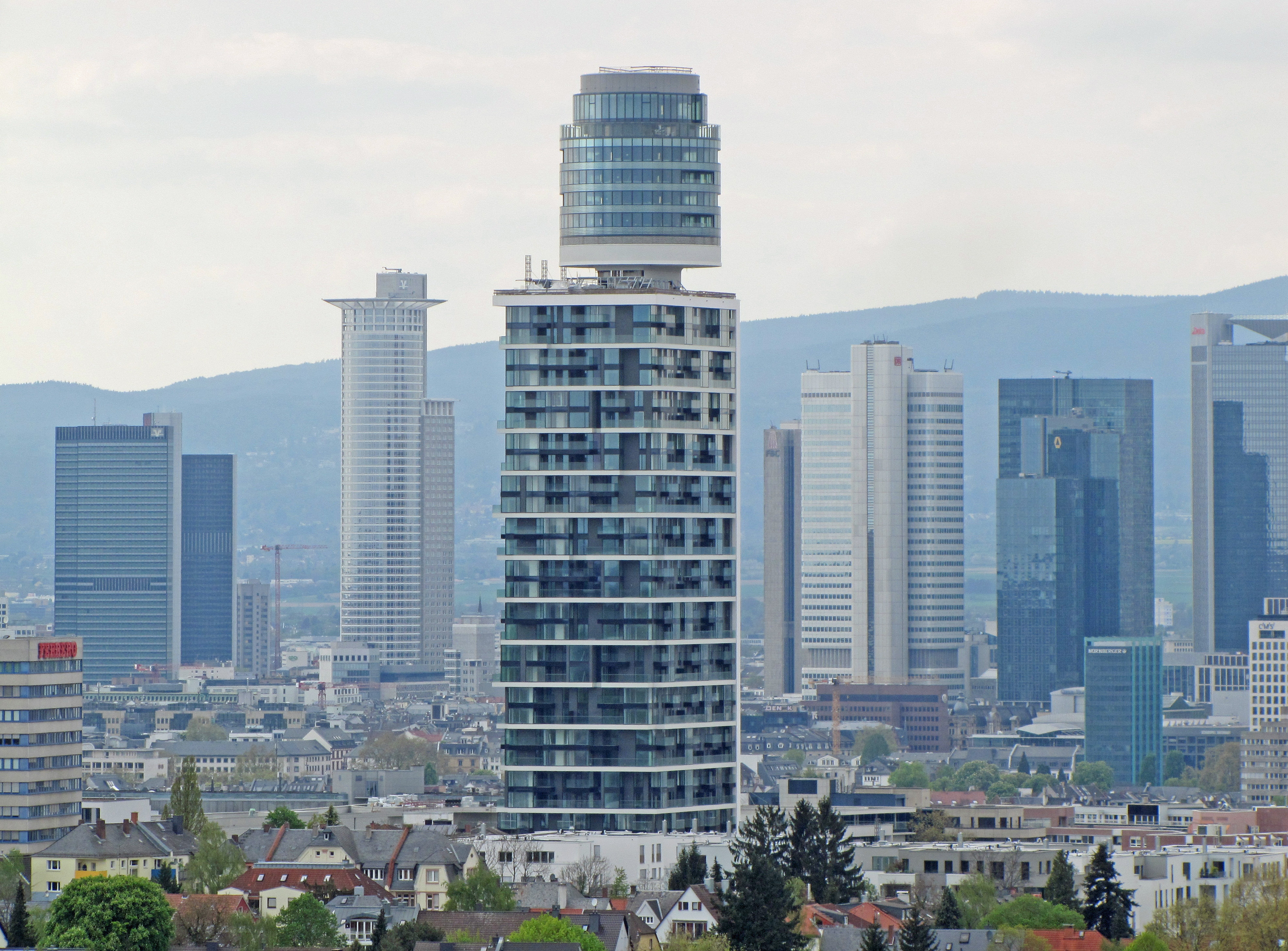
Skyline of Frankfurt with the new Henninger-Turm

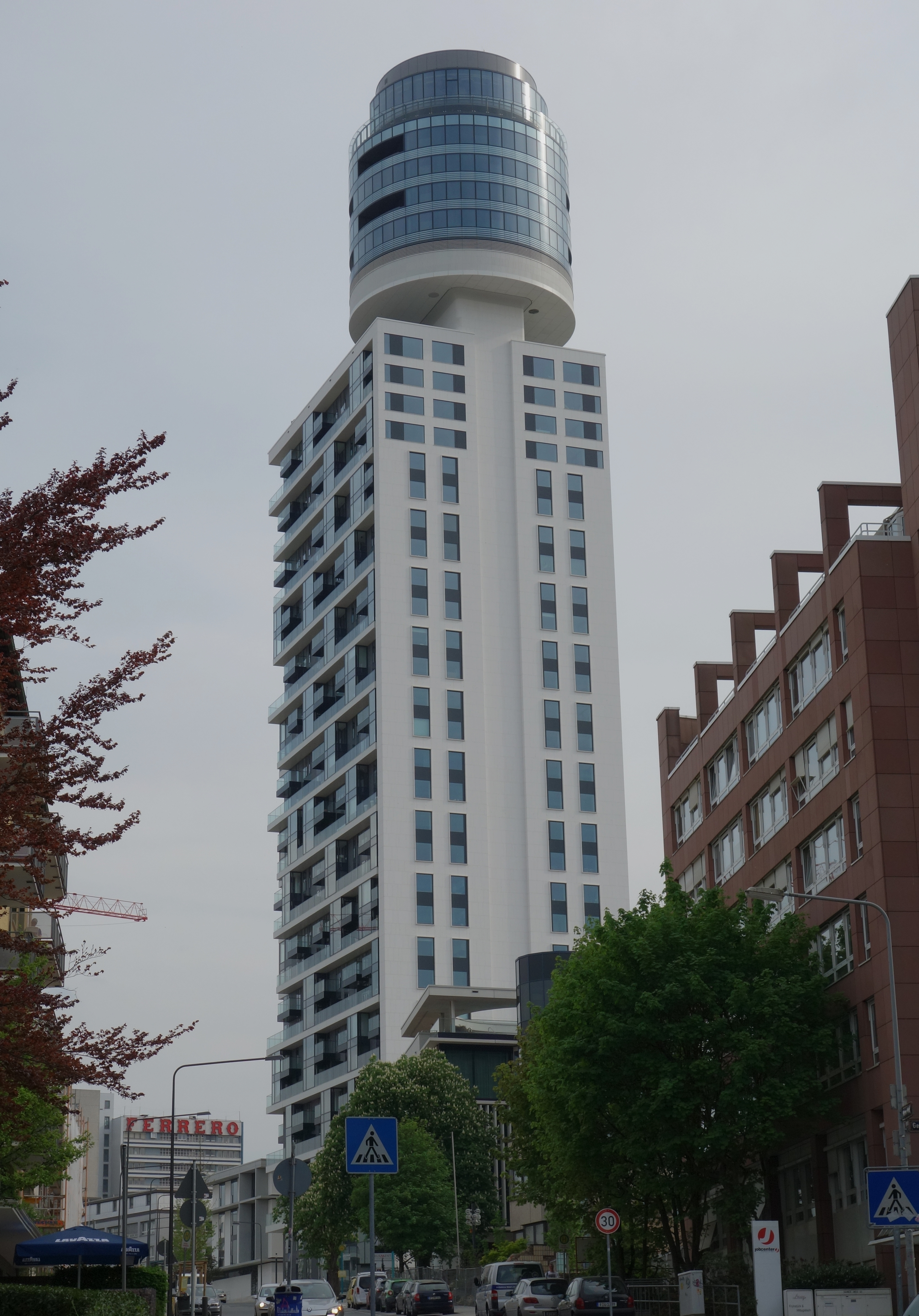
The new Henninger-Turm in 2018

== See also ==
- List of towers
- Schapfen Mill Tower, a 115-meter silo near Ulm
