= BauNetz =

BauNetz Media is a German online platform offering services for architects, planners, and designers. The online magazine BauNetz is dedicated to daily news in international architecture. The magazine was started in 1996 and is located at Berlin Charlottenburg. BauNetz Media is part of the Paris-based group Infopro Digital. In 2018, Baunetz recorded a monthly average of more than 1 million visits and a good 10 million page impressions, according to IVW-audited data.
