= Timeline of Frankfurt =

Coordinates: 50°06′43″N 8°41′09″E

The following is a timeline of the history of the city of Frankfurt am Main, Germany.

== Prehistory ==
In prehistory, the site where the core of the Old City later developed (Domhügel, Cathedral Hill) was a flood-safe higher ground next to the ford across the River Main, where a prehistoric North–South road crossed the East-West flowing river.

- ~ 6000 BC – Oldest archaeological evidence of human use of the river ford at Domhügel (Mesolithic).
- ~ 5th century BC – First permanent Celtic farming settlement. Important Celtic towns exist nearby, including Altkönig, Heidetränk and Glauberg.
- 1st century BCE – Celtic settlers migrate southward and are replaced and assimilated by Germanic tribes, mostly the Mattiaci and Chatti.
- 10/9 BCE – first Roman campaign (led by general Nero Claudius Drusus) in the region, ultimately unsuccessful. The Rhine remained the Roman Empire's border, the Frankfurt area though was under heavy Roman influence from nearby provincial capital Mogontiacum (Mainz).

== Roman era ==
- 83 CE – Rome under Domitian manages to annex the east bank of the Rhine, including the Frankfurt area, which becomes part of the Germania Superior province. A military outpost is built at the Domhügel.
- after 83 CE – Fortification of the new imperial borders in the Frankfurt area by the Limes Germanicus defensive wall. One of its massive border forts was the Saalburg in the Taunus mountains, about 18 km north of the Domhügel.
- late 1st century CE – the Roman city of Nida in modern-day Heddernheim borough of Frankfurt is the capital of Civitas Taunensium (a district of Gemania Superior province) and has about 10,000 inhabitants.
- 110 CE – The military base at Domhügel is replaced by a civilian settlement which had a Roman bathhouse.
- c. 135 CE – Saalburg is replaced by a much larger stone fort holding about 500 men.
- around 200 – increasing pressure by the Chatti and newly arrived Alemanni on the Limes border.
- 213 – Roman war under Caracalla against the Alemanni and Chatti pacifies the region for about two decades. The city of Nida is fortified by defensive walls.
- 233 – Alemanni incursions resume.
- 260 – after further major Alemannic incursions in 254 and 260, Rome abandons the right bank of the Rhine and the Limes including the Saalburg (Fall of the Limes).

== Middle ages ==
- 843 CE – City becomes capital of East Francia.
- 1180 – Staufenmauer built.
- 1241 – Judenschlacht – First of two pogroms of Jews in the city.
- 1333 – City expands.
- 1349 – Judenschlacht.
- 1360 – Schützenverein Frankfurt-Höchst (militia) formed.
- 1370 – Public clock installed (approximate date).
- 1372
  - Free City of Frankfurt becomes part of Holy Roman Empire.
  - City buys forest from Charles IV.
- 1405 – Römer converted into city hall.
- 1428 – Eschenheimer Turm built.
- 1462 – Frankfurter Judengasse established.
- 1493 – Passion play begins.

== Early modern era ==
- 1531 – Printing press in operation.
- 1581 – Rumpolt's cookbook published.
- 1585 – Bourse established.
- 1648 – Peace of Westphalia confirms Frankfurt as an Imperial Free City.
- 1681 – St. Catherine's Church built.
- 1719 – Fire.
- 1739 – Palais Thurn und Taxis built.
- 1742 – The Palais Barckhaus at Zeil in Frankfurt serves as residence of Emperor Charles VII until 1744
- 1748 – Gebrüder Bethmann formed.
- 1750 – Mainzer Landstraße built.
- 1759 – January: City occupied by French.
- 1774 – Botanical garden laid out.
- 1790 – 9 October: Coronation of Leopold II, Holy Roman Emperor.
- 1792 – City occupied by French.

== 19th century ==
- 1806
  - City occupied by French.
  - City becomes Principality of Frankfurt, under Karl Theodor Anton Maria von Dalberg.
- 1808 – Frankfurter Opern- und Museumsorchester (orchestra) established.
- 1810 – City becomes part of Grand Duchy of Frankfurt.
- 1812 – City refortified.
- 1815 – Städel founded.
- 1816 – Free City of Frankfurt becomes part of German Confederation.
- 1817 – Population: 41,458
- 1829 – Frankfurter Kunstverein founded.
- 1833
  - Frankfurter Wachensturm.
  - Paulskirche built.
- 1839 – Taunus Railway begins operating.
- 1840 – Population: 55,269
- 1843 – Alte Börse (Frankfurt am Main) (stock exchange) built.
- 1846 – International Penitentiary Congress held in Frankfurt.
- 1848
  - September: "Uprising."
  - Frankfurt Assembly formed.
- 1849 – Constitution of the German Empire proclaimed by Frankfurt Parliament.
- 1856 – Frankfurter Zeitung begins publication.
- 1858 – Frankfurt Zoological Garden founded.
- 1859 – Frankfurt City Link Line begins operating.
- 1861 – Population: 71,462.
- 1863 – Federation of German Workers Associations founded in Frankfurt.
- 1864 – Population: 77,372
- 1866 – City becomes part of Hesse-Nassau, Prussia.
- 1867 – Frankfurt Cathedral rebuilt.
- 1868 – Eiserner Steg (bridge) built.
- 1871
  - Treaty of Frankfurt signed.
  - Palmengarten opens.
- 1872 – Trams begin operating.
- 1875 – Population: 103,136.
- 1878 – Dr. Hoch's Konservatorium – Musikakademie founded.
- 1879 – Kleinmarkthalle Frankfurt (market) opens.
- 1880 – Alte Oper inaugurated.
- 1881 – Metallgesellschaft founded.
- 1886 – Frankfurter Friedensverein (peace group) organized.
- 1890 – Population: 179,985
- 1895
  - Bockenheim becomes part of city.
  - Stempel Type Foundry established.
  - Population: 229,279.
- 1897 – Frankfurt Motor Show begins.

== 20th century ==
=== 1900s–1940s ===
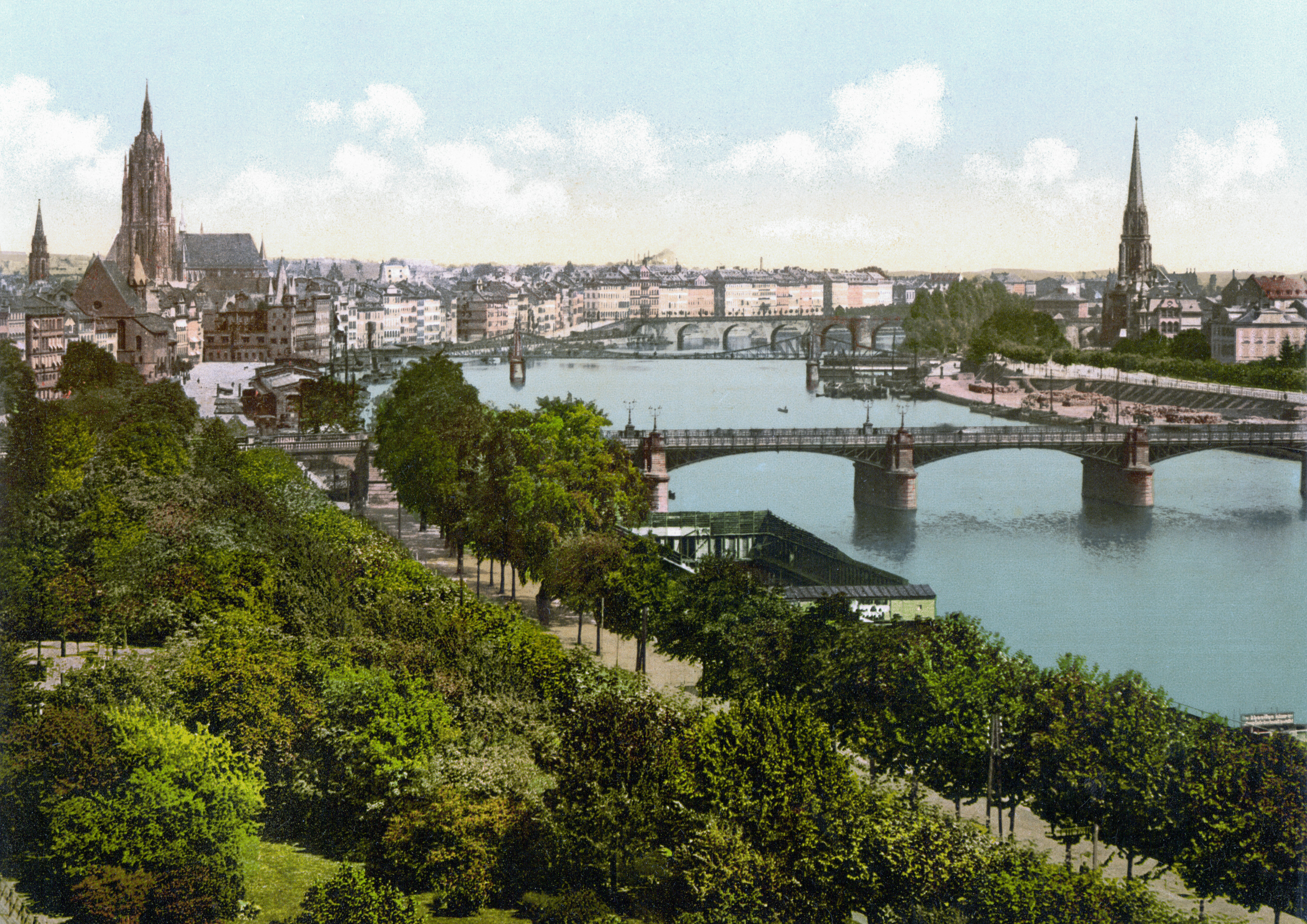
Frankfurt at the turn of the 19th and 20th centuries

- 1904 – Museum der Weltkulturen founded.
- 1905 – Population: 334,978.
- 1907 - May: City hosts the 1907 World Weightlifting Championships and 1907 World Wrestling Championships.
- 1909
  - Städtische Galerie Liebieghaus established.
  - Festhalle built.
- 1914 – University of Frankfurt established.
- 1919 – Population: 433,002.
- 1923 – Institute for Social Research founded.
- 1925 – Husarendenkmal (Frankfurt am Main) (monument) installed.
- 1926 – Alte Brücke (Frankfurt) (bridge) rebuilt.
- 1928
  - Höchst becomes part of city.
  - Großmarkthalle built.
  - Polish Consulate relocated from Cologne to Frankfurt.
  - Population: 551,200.
- 1929
  - Frankfurt Radio Symphony formed.
  - Holy Cross Church built.
- 1930 – IG Farben Building constructed.
- 1931 – Frankfurter Volksbank Stadion opens.
- 1934 – Adlerwerke vorm. Heinrich Kleyer established.
- 1936
  - Frankfurt Airport opens.
  - Grüneburgpark opens.
- 1937 – Nazi camp for Sinti and Romani people established (see also Porajmos).
- 1938 – Frankfurt University of Music and Performing Arts founded.
- 1942
  - Nazi camp for Sinti and Romani people dissolved.
  - February: Forced labour camp established in the Heddernheim district.
- 1944 – Bombing begins.

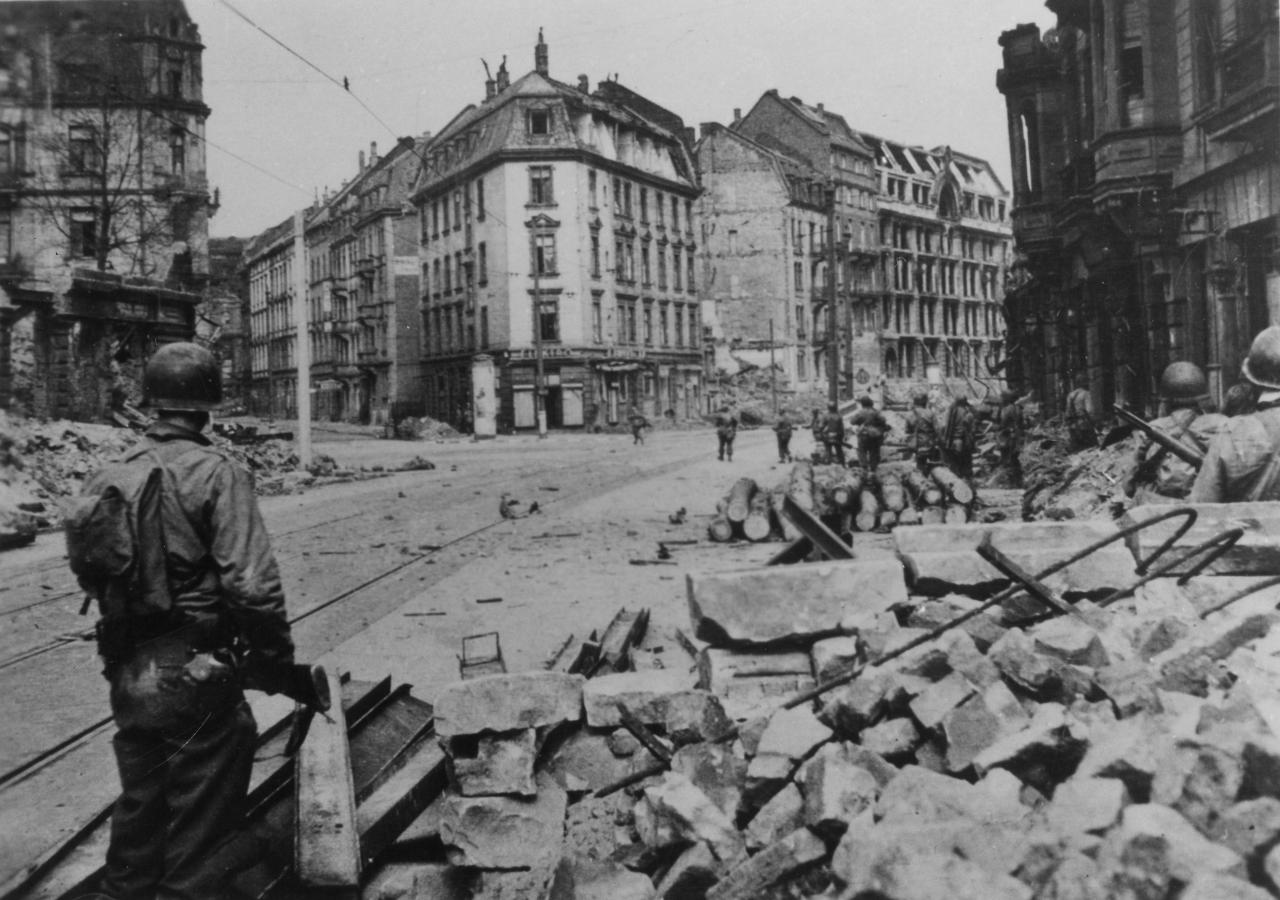
American troops in Frankfurt in 1945

- 1945
  - 18 March: Forced labour camp in Heddernheim dissolved. Prisoners deported to the Buchenwald concentration camp.
  - 26–29 March: Battle of Frankfurt
  - July: American zone of Allied-occupied Germany headquartered in Frankfurt.
  - Frankfurter Rundschau begins publication.
- 1946 – Eschwege displaced persons camp set up.
- 1948
  - Hessischer Rundfunk begins broadcasting.
  - Bank deutscher Länder headquartered in Frankfurt.
- 1949
  - Frankfurt Book Fair resumes.
  - Deutsches Institut für Filmkunde founded.
  - Frankfurter Allgemeine Zeitung (newspaper) begins publication.

=== 1950s–1990s ===
- 1951 – Opern- und Schauspielhaus Frankfurt built.
- 1953 – Population: 600,579.
- 1954 – Goethe House opens.
- 1955 – Frankfurt Egelsbach Airport opens.
- 1957
  - Deutsche Bundesbank headquartered in Frankfurt.
  - Eurovision Song Contest 1957 held.
- 1958
  - Noor Mosque built.
  - Museum für Kommunikation Frankfurt and Cinema Kino open.
- 1959 – Justizvollzugsanstalt Frankfurt am Main IV (prison) begins operating.
- 1960
  - Sigmund-Freud-Institut founded.
  - City twinned with Lyon, France.
- 1963 – Frankfurt Auschwitz Trials begin.
- 1966 – City twinned with Birmingham, United Kingdom.
- 1967 – City twinned with Deuil-La Barre, France.
- 1968 – Frankfurt U-Bahn begins operating.
- 1970
  - Peace Research Institute Frankfurt and Frankfurter Autoren Theater founded.
  - City twinned with Milan, Italy.
- 1974 – City-Haus built.
- 1978
  - Rhine-Main S-Bahn begins operating.
  - Historic Railway museum founded.
- 1979
  - Europaturm built.
  - Titanic magazine begins publication.
  - City twinned with Cairo, Egypt.
- 1980 – City twinned with Tel Aviv, Israel.
- 1981
  - Frankfurt Marathon begins.
  - Museum für Moderne Kunst founded.
- 1984 – German Architecture Museum opens.
- 1987 – Neues Theater Höchst founded.
- 1988 – City twinned with Guangzhou, China.
- 1989
  - City hosts Bundesgartenschau (garden show).
  - City twinned with Toronto, Canada.
- 1990
  - May: City hosts the 1990 European Judo Championships.
  - City twinned with Budapest, Hungary, and Prague, Czech Republic.
- 1991
  - Andreas von Schoeler becomes mayor.
  - City twinned with Granada, Nicaragua, Kraków, Poland, and Leipzig.
- 1992 – Institut für Stadtgeschichte (Frankfurt am Main) (Institute for City History) established.
- 1993
  - Westendstrasse 1 built.
  - Deutsche Börse headquartered in Frankfurt.
- 1994 – European Monetary Institute headquartered in Frankfurt.
- 1995
  - Deutscher Commercial Internet Exchange founded.
  - Petra Roth becomes mayor.
- 1996 – City website online (approximate date).
- 1998 – European Central Bank headquartered in Frankfurt.
- 1999 – Main Tower built.
- 2000
  - Museum Giersch opens.
  - Population: 646,550.

== 21st century ==
- 2001 – Cinestar Metropolis (movie theatre) in business.
- 2002 – Köln–Frankfurt high-speed rail line begins operating.
- 2003
  - Bikeshare program launched.
  - Adorno-Denkmal (monument) installed.
- 2005 - Wikimania conference held in city.
- 2007
  - Holy Cross – Centre for Christian Meditation and Spirituality of the Roman Catholic Diocese of Limburg in the Holy Cross Church in Bornheim founded.
  - City twinned with Dubai, United Arab Emirates.
- 2009 – Zeil renovated.
- 2011
  - June–July: City co-hosts the 2011 FIFA Women's World Cup.
  - City twinned with Yokohama, Japan.
- 2012 - Peter Feldmann becomes mayor.
- 2013 – City twinned with Eskişehir, Turkey.
- 2014 – Population: 714,241.
- 2015
  - Economic unrest.
  - City twinned with Philadelphia, United States.

== See also ==
- History of Frankfurt am Main
- List of mayors of Frankfurt

Other cities in the state of Hesse:^{(de)}

- Timeline of Kassel

== Bibliography ==
=== in English ===
Published in 18th–19th centuries

- Thomas Nugent (1749), "Frankfort", The Grand Tour, vol. 2: Germany and Holland, London: S. Birt, hdl:2027/mdp.39015030762572
- Edward Augustus Domeier (1830), "Frankfort on the Maine", Descriptive Road-Book of Germany, London: Samuel Leigh, hdl:2027/hvd.hx167e
- Webster, Hugh Alexander (1879). "Frankfort-on-the-Main" . Encyclopædia Britannica. Vol. 9 (9th ed.).

Published in 20th century

- Frankfurt am Main. City Engineers Dept. (1907). Guide to Some of the Public Works of Frankfort-am-Main.
- Frankfurter Verkehrsverein (1908). Official guide for Frankfort-on-Main and vicinity. Frankfort-on-Main: R. Th. Hauser & Co.
- "Frankfort-on-Main" . Encyclopædia Britannica. Vol. 11 (11th ed.). 1910. pp. 17–21.
- "Frankfort", The Rhine, Leipzig: Karl Baedeker, 1911, OCLC 21888483 + 1882 ed.
- Nathaniel Newnham Davis (1911), "Frankfort-am-Main", The Gourmet's Guide to Europe (3rd ed.), London: Grant Richards
- Martin Herbert Dodge (1920), The government of the city of Frankfort-on-the Main, [New York?], OCLC 2056934, OL 6632558M
- Robert E Dickinson (1951). "Structure of the German City: Frankfurt". West European City: a Geographical Interpretation. Routledge. ISBN 978-1-136-25970-8.
- Carl-Ludwig Holtfrerich [in German] (1999). "Chronicle of Frankfurt as a financial centre (chronology)". Frankfurt as a Financial Centre: From Medieval Trade Fair to European Banking Centre. C.H.Beck. ISBN 978-3-406-45671-8. (chronology)

=== in German ===
- Zeiller, Martin (1646). "Franckfurt". Topographia Hassiae et Regionum Vicinarum. Topographia Germaniae (in German). Frankfurt. p. 27+. circa 1646/1655
- "Frankfurt a.M.". Biblioteca geographica: Verzeichniss der seit der Mitte des vorigen Jahrhunderts bis zu Ende des Jahres 1856 in Deutschland (in German). Leipzig: Wilhelm Engelmann. 1858. (bibliography)
- Stadtgemeinde Frankfurt a.M. (1903). Das städtische Tiefbauwesen in Frankfurt a.M. (in German). Schirmer & Mahkau.
- Frankfurt a.M. Griebens Reiseführer (in German). A. Goldschmidt. 1912.
- P. Krauss und E. Uetrecht, ed. (1913). "Frankfurt a.M.". Meyers Deutscher Städteatlas [Meyer's Atlas of German Cities] (in German). Leipzig: Bibliographisches Institut.
- Karl Enslin (1861). Frankfurter Sagenbuch. Sagen und sagenhafte Geschichten aus Frankfurt am Main. Neue Ausgabe (in German). Frankfurt a. M., H. L. Brönner.
