= Chaim Moshe Bergstein =

Personal life
- Born: Eschwege displaced persons camp, American-occupied Germany

Religious life
- Religion: Judaism
- Denomination: Chabad
- Residence: Michigan

Chaim Moshe Bergstein is a rabbi within the Chabad-Lubavitch movement. He has been serving as the director of the Chabad of Farmington Hills, Michigan since 1977.

== Early life ==
Chaim Bergstein was born in the Eschwege displaced persons camp, and was the first baby to be circumcised in the camp. His family was able to get into the American section of Berlin because although his mother came from a Chabad family, his father with a Polish background and passport did not.

Bergstein's family emigrated to the United States in his childhood, settling in the Crown Heights neighborhood of Brooklyn, New York City. Bergstein attended the elementary school of Yeshiva Rabbi Chaim Berlin.

== Career ==
Rabbi Bergstein is the current director of the Chabad of Farmington Hills, Michigan, and has been since 1977. He has also worked closely with the Council of Orthodox Rabbis of Greater Detroit. Rabbi Bergstein, like many in the Chabad movement, also has an online presence in the form of interviews, Chabad.org articles, and his YouTube channel.

== Relationship with the Rebbe ==
Bergstein first met the Rebbe (Menachem Mendel Schneerson) in 1955, at age 9, in a meeting arranged by Bergstein's mother where they discussed the importance of tzitzit. He also wrote to the Rebbe in 1969 asking a question about iskafya, which resulted in the two of them meeting to discuss the issue on Bergstein's 23rd birthday in 1969.
