= Mike Josef =

German politician

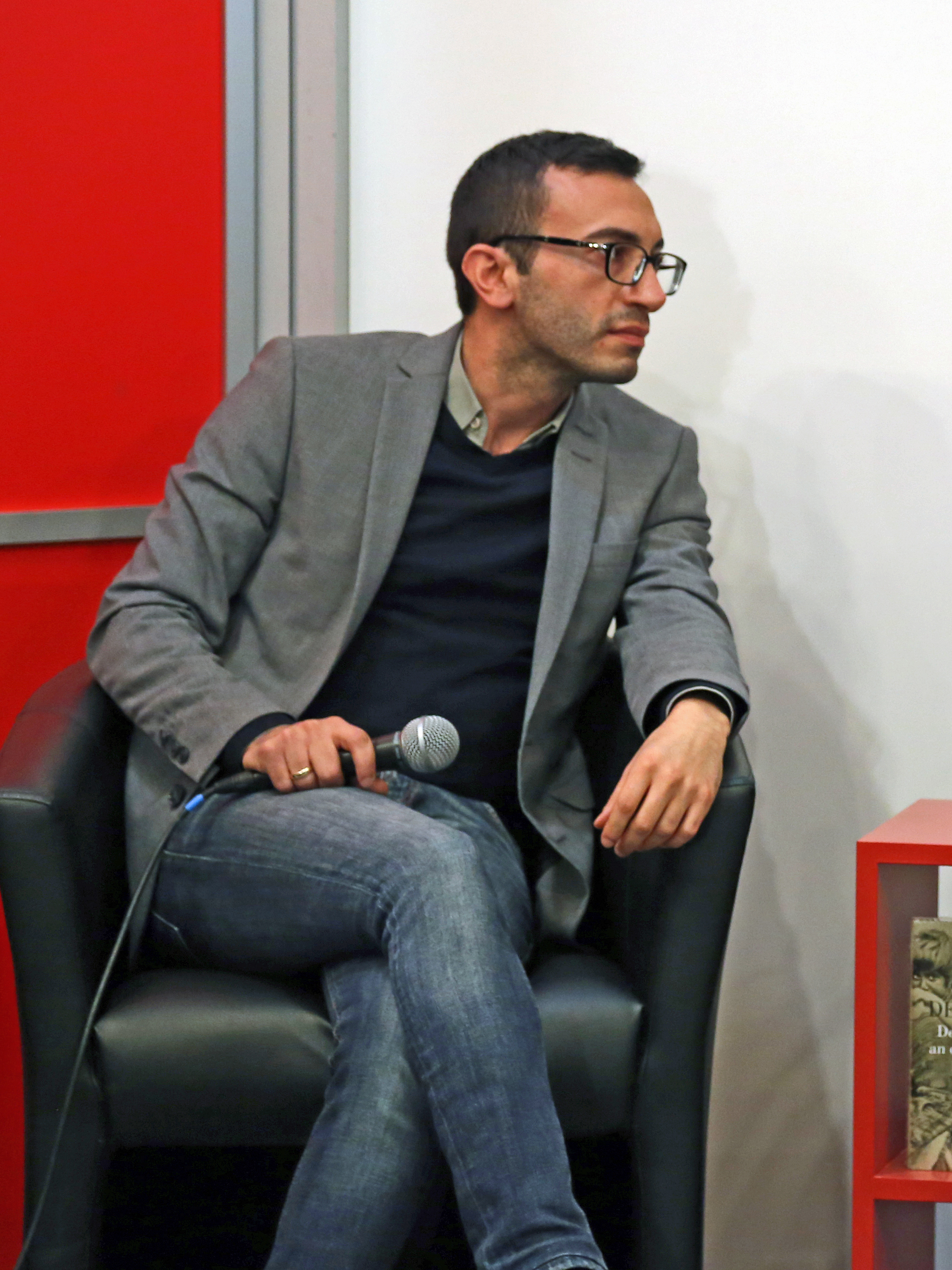
- Mike Josef in 2015

Oberbürgermeister of Frankfurt
- Incumbent
- Assumed office 15 May 2023
- Preceded by: Nargess Eskandari-Grünberg (acting)

Full-Time City Councilor and Head of the Department of Planning and Housing and Sports
- In office 2016–2023

Member of the Frankfurt am Main City Council
- In office 2011–2016
- Preceded by: multi-member district
- Succeeded by: multi-member district

Organizing Secretary at the German Trade Union Federation (DGB)
- In office 2011–2016

Personal details
- Born: Mike Yusuf; 25 January 1983 (age 43) Qamishli, Syria
- Party: Social Democratic Party

Mike Josef (né Yusuf; Syriac: ܡܐܝܟ ܝܘܣܦ; born 25 January 1983) is a German politician who has served as the Lord Mayor (Oberbürgermeister) of Frankfurt am Main since May 2023.

On 26 March 2023, he was elected mayor of Frankfurt in a runoff election of the Lord Mayor with 92,371 votes (51.7% of the votes cast) against the CDU candidate Uwe Becker. The day of his inauguration is 11 May 2023.

== Early life and education ==
Josef was born in Qamishli, Syrian Arabic Republic to an ethnic Aramean family. He came from Syria to Germany at the age of four, where they were recognized as political refugees because they had no longer been safe in Syria as Christians. They lived briefly in Krauchenwies and then in the Ulm district of Wiblingen. Josef refers to Ulm as his hometown. He played junior soccer at TV Wiblingen there and at SSV Ulm 1846, and later coached a junior team at TV Wiblingen himself with a friend. Ulm is also where his two sisters were born.

He first attended a secondary school, later a junior high school. In 2002, he obtained his technical college entrance qualification in Neu-Ulm. There he completed civilian service with the German Red Cross (DRK) from 2002 to 2003. From 2003 to 2004, he studied social work at the University of Applied Sciences in Frankfurt up to his intermediate diploma. Until 2010, he studied political science, history and law at the Goethe University in Frankfurt, where he graduated as a political scientist.

During his studies, he was a member of the General Student Committee (AStA) at Frankfurt University, a member of the executive committee of the AStA, and a working student at the Federal Ministry of the Environment. In 2007, he was a student confidant for the constitutional complaint against the introduction of tuition fees in Hesse, spokesman for the Juso university groups in Hesse and from 2008 to 2010 spokesman for the Frankfurt Jusos. He also became a member of the Education and Science Workers' Union (GEW) and the Workers' Welfare Organization (AWO).

== Political career ==
From 2011 to 2016, Josef worked as organizing secretary at the German Trade Union Federation (DGB). In addition, he was a city councilor in Frankfurt am Main from 2011 and chairman of the SPD subdistrict of Frankfurt am Main from 2013, and later also SPD parliamentary group chairman in the city council. In 2016, the city council elected him as a full-time city councilor. He took over as head of the Department of Planning and Housing. Since 2021, he has been the department head for planning, housing and sports.

After Peter Feldmann was voted out of office on 6 November 2022, Josef ran for the SPD in the election for Lord Mayor of the City of Frankfurt am Main. On 26 March 2023, he was elected in the second round of voting; in the runoff, he prevailed against Uwe Becker (CDU). Voter turnout was 35.4 percent. During the election campaign, Josef had called for higher investment in schools and housing, as well as an energy assistance fund to provide relief for those affected by high energy costs. This could be financed by the record revenues from the trade tax. Josef calls for "tough action" against drug dealers, including more police officers on the streets. According to him, it is evident that Frankfurt am Main is currently taking in too many addicts from southern Germany. A weapons ban zone and more video surveillance are also intended to ensure greater internal security. Josef also wants to take action against the "littering of public space," among other things by imposing noticeable penalties.

== Personal life ==
Josef is married and has two sons with his wife Chrisovalandou, whose parents are from Greece. He is a Protestant.
