= Ludwig Landmann =

German politician (1868–1945)

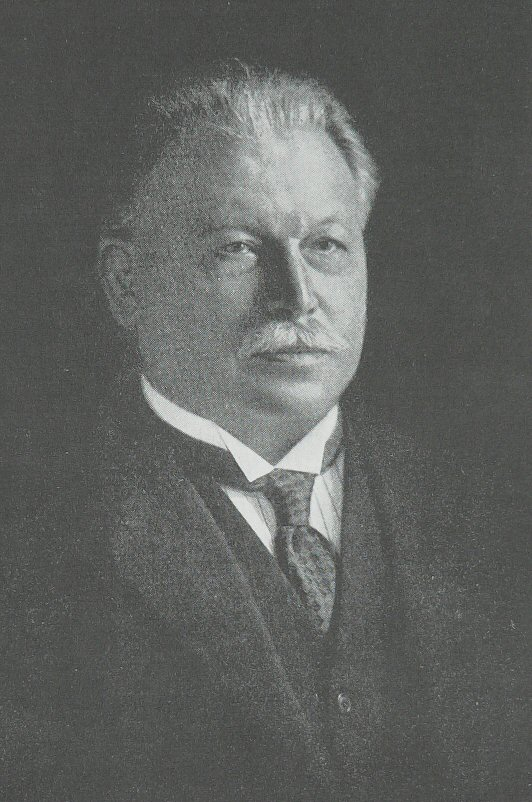
- Born: 18 May 1868; Mannheim, Grand Duchy of Baden
- Died: 5 March 1945 (aged 76); Voorburg, Netherlands

Ludwig Landmann (18 May 1868 – 5 March 1945) was a liberal German Jewish politician of the Weimar Republic. Landmann belonged first to the National Social party, then the Progressive People's Party, and finally, after the German revolution of 1918, the German Democratic Party.

He eventually moved from Mannheim to Frankfurt, where he became Mayor of Frankfurt from 1924 until 1933 and led a significant expansion of the city. Through reorganizations and construction, Landmann gave the city new luster. Landmann was the first Jewish mayor of Frankfurt.

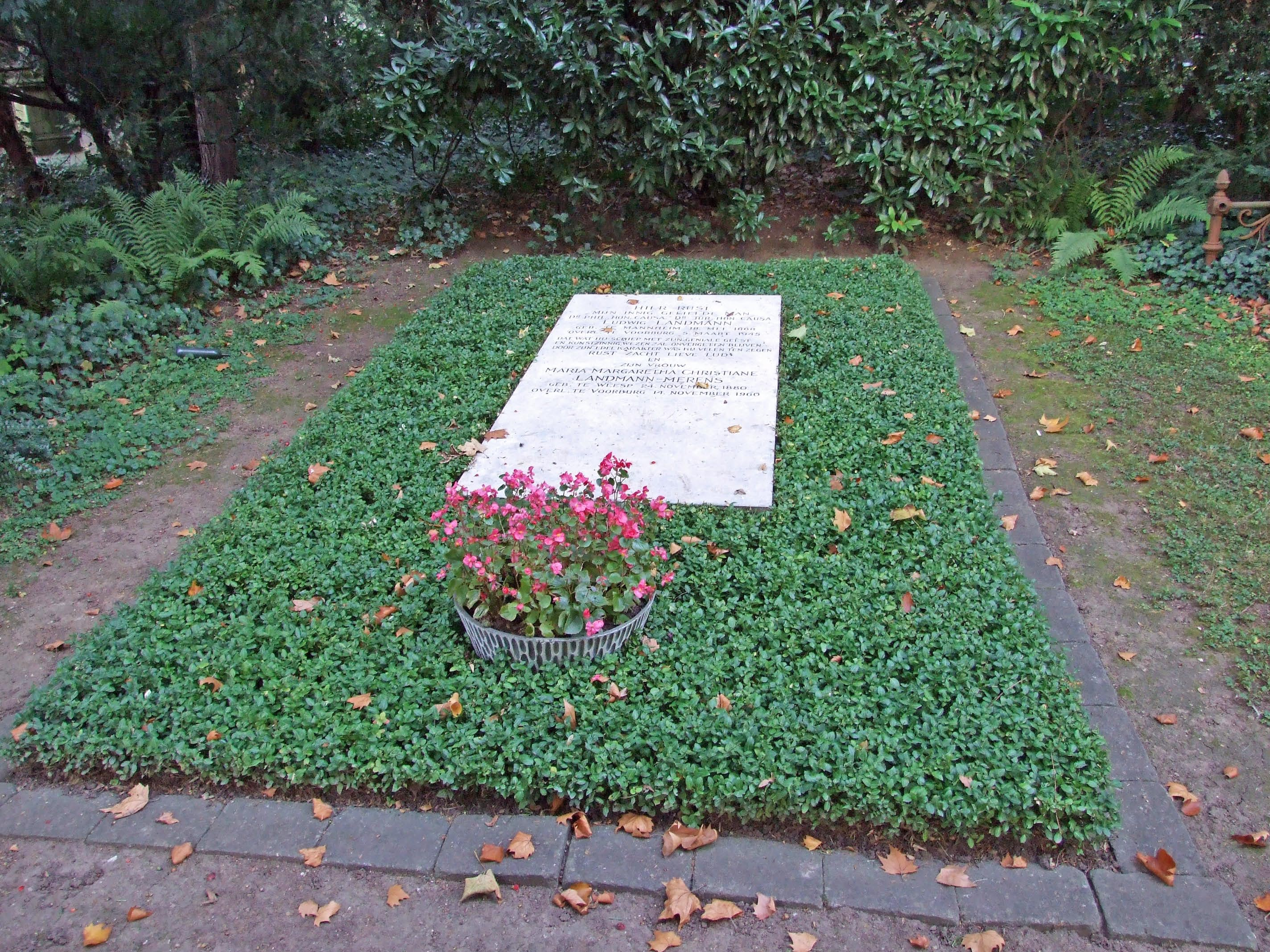
Landmann gravesite at Frankfurt's main cemetery

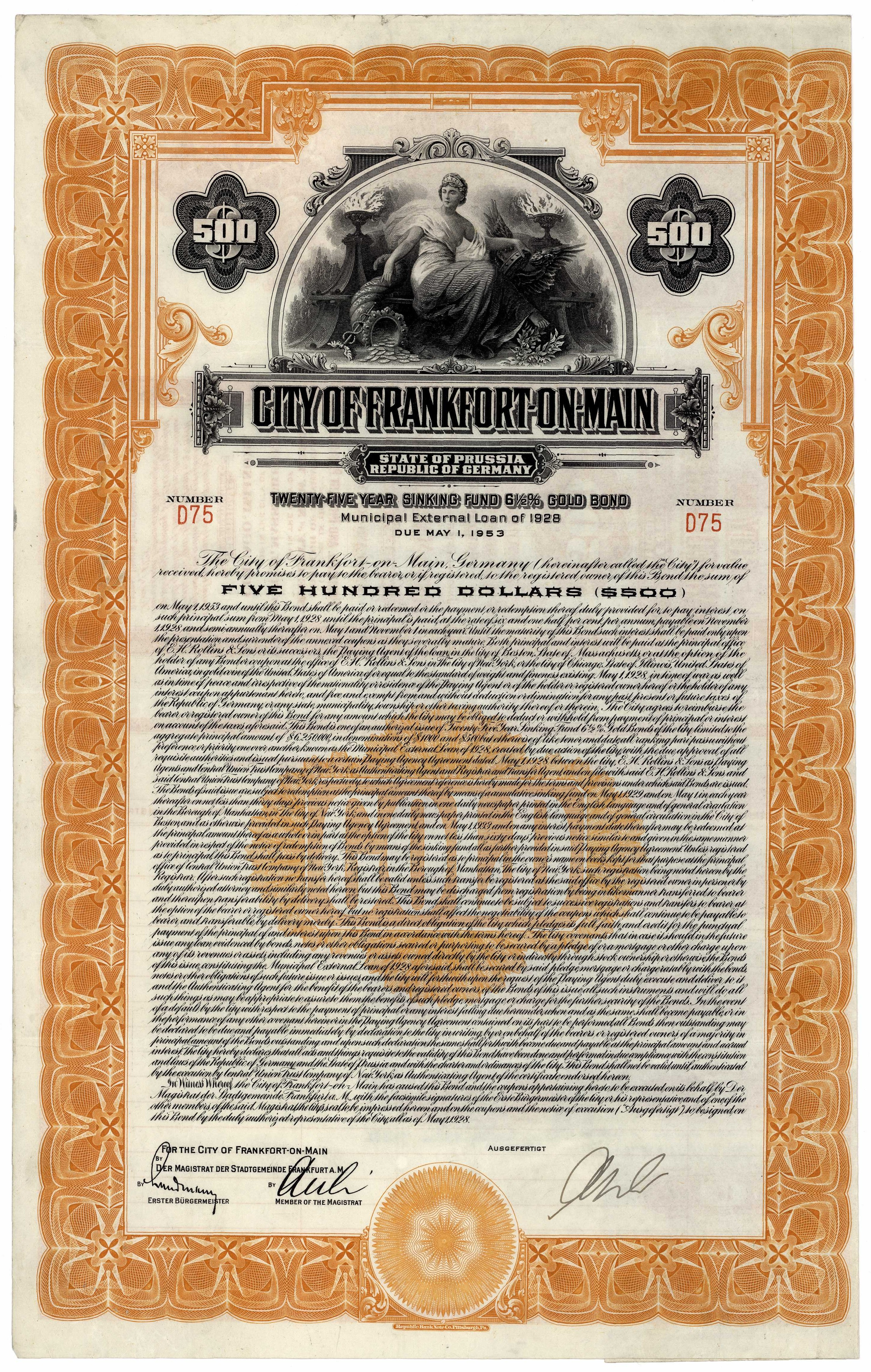
Gold bond of the City of Frankfort-on-Main, issued 1 May 1928, signed by mayor Ludwig Landmann.

At the time he was mayor he hired the architect Ernst May to organize a new housing project, which became known as the New Frankfurt (Neues Frankfurt). Landmann also founded the Nassauische Heimstätte (Nassau Home), a housing association to improve the access to decent housing amongst the wider population.

On 30 January 1933, Adolf Hitler became Chancellor of Germany. He and the Nazi regime seized power. In the months that followed, the new rulers curtailed political and democratic rights through presidential emergency decrees. Key decrees were the Reichstag Fire Decree of 28 February 1933 and the Enabling Act of 24 March 1933. The German federal election on 5 March 1933 was the first of many sham elections.
After the Nazi election victory in the municipal (sham) election on 12 March 1933, Landmann was expelled from his office. He handed in his official resignation as mayor and was succeeded by Friedrich Krebs (NSDAP).

Landmann left then for Berlin. But because of his Jewish ancestry, he was exposed to various antisemitic Nazi harassment; among other things, his pension payments were temporarily stopped. In 1939, he left Germany and emigrated to the Netherlands, the home of his wife. The Jewish Property Tax, the Reich Flight Tax, and illness left him virtually penniless. When the Wehrmacht invaded and occupied the Netherlands in May 1940, he was hidden by relatives and friends to protect him from deportation and certain death. He died in March 1945 in hiding from malnutrition and Heart failure during Holland's 'Hunger Winter'.

Today Ludwig Landmann Street in Frankfurt is dedicated to his memory. A portrait of the mayor by William Runze, a painter from the Sossenheim district of Frankfurt, hangs in the Council Hall at the Römer, Frankfurt's City Hall.
