= Friedrich Krebs (mayor) =

Nazi German Mayor of Frankfurt

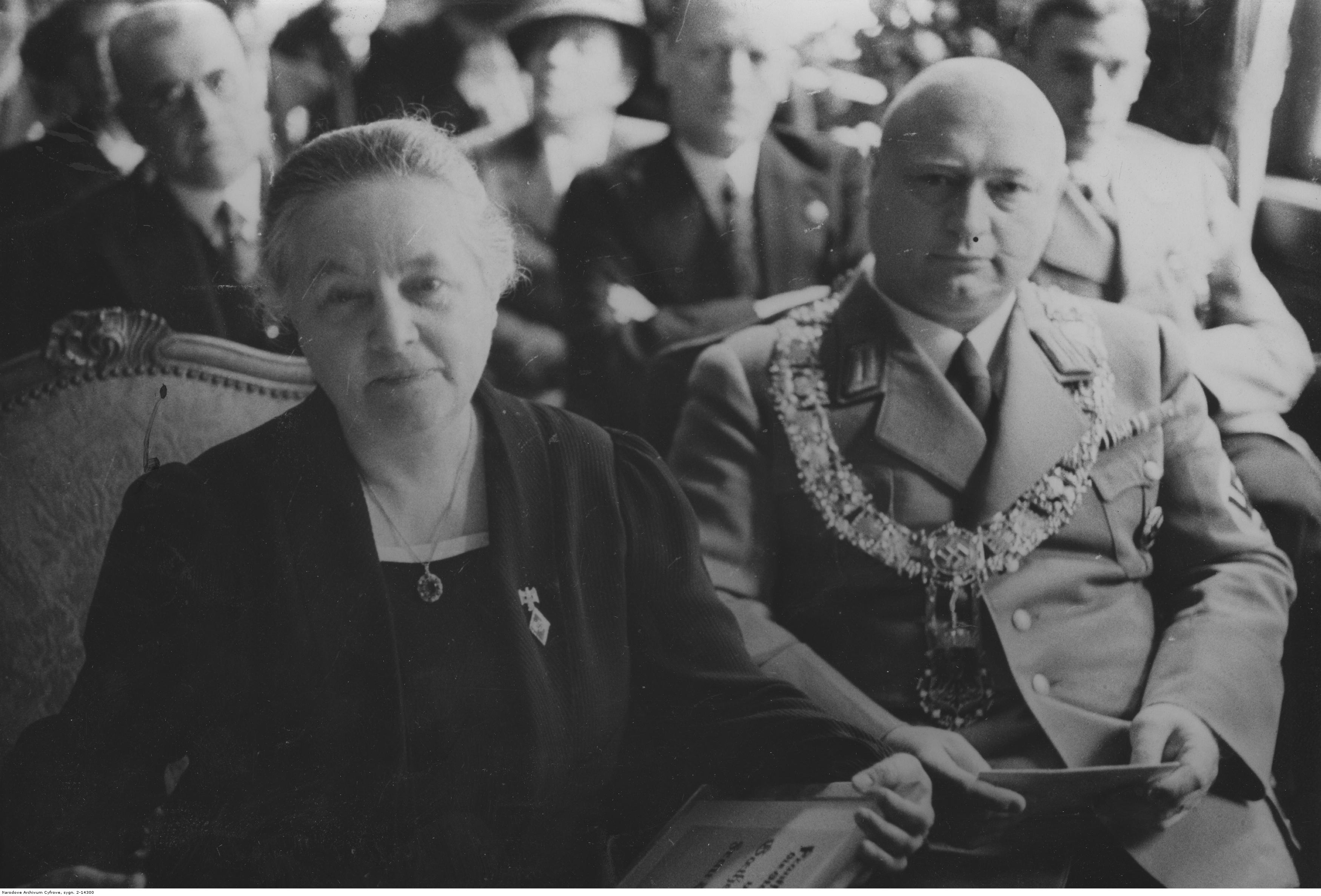
- Krebs with Agnes Miegel, 1940

Oberbürgermeister of Frankfurt
- In office 12 March 1933 – 28 March 1945
- Preceded by: Ludwig Landmann
- Succeeded by: Wilhelm Hollbach

Personal details
- Born: 9 May 1894 Germersheim, Alsace–Lorraine, German Empire
- Died: 6 May 1961 (aged 66) Frankfurt, Hesse, West Germany
- Party: Nazi Party (NSDAP)
- Other political affiliations: National Socialist Freedom Movement; German Party
- Education: Kaiser Wilhelm University of Strasbourg; University of Giessen
- Profession: Lawyer

Military service
- Allegiance: German Empire
- Branch/service: Imperial German Army
- Years of service: 1914–1918
- Rank: Leutnant
- Unit: 10th (Lower Saxony) Foot Artillery Regiment
- Battles/wars: World War I

Friedrich Krebs (9 May 1894 – 6 May 1961) was a German lawyer and Oberbürgermeister of Frankfurt during Nazi Germany. In March 1933, Krebs, a fervent antisemite and member of the Nazi Party, ousted the previous mayor, Ludwig Landmann, who was Jewish. Within two weeks Krebs fired all Jewish city employees, even before the German Law for the Restoration of the Professional Civil Service formally removed Jews from government service.

== Early life ==
Krebs grew up in Alsace and attended schools in Thann, Weißenburg and Strasbourg. After completing realschule and earning his abitur in 1912, he studied law and political science at the Kaiser Wilhelm University of Strasbourg. During his studies, he became a member of the Germania Strasbourg fraternity in 1913. At the outbreak of the First World War he enlisted in the Imperial German Army as a one-year volunteer with the 10th (Lower Saxony) Foot Artillery Regiment, headquartered in Strasbourg. He served throughout the war, attaining the rank of Leutnant. Following the end of the war and the annexation of Alsace by France, he was expelled from Strasbourg at the end of 1918 and migrated to Frankfurt, where he passed his state examination in law in 1919. Krebs received his doctorate in 1922 from the University of Giessen and subsequently became a judge on the District Court of Frankfurt from 1923 to 1925. He then served as a member of the German representation at the German-English Arbitration Court in Berlin from 1926 to 1928 and a District Court Councilor in the 4th Civil Chamber of the Higher Regional Court of Frankfurt.

== Political career ==
Parallel to his legal career, Krebs was involved in the Völkisch movement from 1922 to 1925. An early member of the Nazi Party and its local leader in Frankfurt, in 1924 he became the Frankfurt Ortsgruppenleiter (Local Group Leader) of the National Socialist Freedom Movement, a front organization of the then banned Nazi Party. On 1 February 1929, he rejoined the Nazis (member number 173,763), and at the 1932 Prussian state election he was returned as a Nazi deputy to the Landtag of Prussia, serving until its dissolution in October 1933. Krebs also served as the local chairman of the National Socialist Association of Legal Professionals.

Following Adolf Hitler's national seizure of power, the Nazis set about taking over the administration of the German states and cities. The first Jewish Oberbürgermeister of Frankfurt, Ludwig Landmann, was ousted on 12 March 1933. Krebs was appointed acting mayor and on 13 June his appointment was confirmed by the City Council. Only Nazi members were present at the election, as the members of the SPD and the KPD, who together had a majority, were banned from participating by the Nazis. On 28 March 1933, Krebs ordered the removal of all Jewish employees and officials of the city from office, affecting 81 members of the city administration or the municipal societies. His approach was later formally approved by the Law on the Restoration of the Professional Civil Service in April 1933. The statue of Friedrich Ebert in front of St. Paul's Church was also removed.

Krebs was also appointed to the Provincial Council of the Prussian Province of Hesse-Nassau and was named provincial Plenipotentiary to the Reichsrat, serving until its abolition on 14 February 1934. He also served as the Nazi Party Kreisleiter (County Leader) for the Frankfurt area from August 1933 to October 1937. On 21 December 1933, Prussian Minister President Hermann Göring appointed Krebs to the Prussian State Council.

In 1933, Krebs established the Frankfurter Mode Amt (Fashion Office) to help make Frankfurt a center for women’s fashion in the Third Reich. In 1935, Krebs appointed Frankfurt as The City of German Crafts after Hitler's consent by telegraph. Previously, Krebs temporarily chaired the board of the HaFraBa Highway Construction Association and had initially tried several times to give Frankfurt the title of City of Roads. However, the Inspector General for German Roads, Fritz Todt, successfully prevented this request. Also in 1935, Krebs, who also worked in the Reich Music Chamber, became head of the Reich Concert Department. He was also a member of the Reich Cultural Senate. He was a passenger on the Hindenburg on its 1936 maiden voyage from Germany to the United States. In 1937, he joined the SA, the Party's paramilitary unit, and he was promoted to SA-Obersturmbannführer on 30 January 1939. In 1941, he was one of the keynote speakers on the occasion of the opening of Alfred Rosenberg's antisemitic Frankfurt Institute for the Study of the Jewish Question. After heavy air raids on Frankfurt on the 18th and 22 March 1944, the Party organized a rally under Krebs with the motto "We never surrender!".

== Life after the Second World War ==
On 29 March 1945, the Second World War ended in Frankfurt with the fall of the city to American forces. Krebs fled the city but was captured, arrested and interned by the American military government in the Darmstadt camp until 1948. He was replaced as mayor by Wilhelm Hollbach, appointed by the United States military command. In denazification court proceedings, it was deemed that he exercised "his office fairly, correctly, cleanly and unaffected by National Socialist tendencies," and thus he was not sanctioned. Decisive for this assessment were the numerous Persilscheine issued by fellow citizens for his discharge. These were related to events during his time as mayor such as his instruction to the fire brigade on 9 November 1938 during the Kristallnacht pogrom, to extinguish the burning of the West Synagogue in Frankfurt, or his conflicts with Gauleiter Jakob Sprenger. Krebs, however, was clearly responsible for measures to 'Nazify' Frankfurt institutions, including Johann Wolfgang Goethe University and Städtische Bühnen, to enforce Nazi racial policy and to destroy the Jewish community of Frankfurt, including deportation of 35,000 from the city in 1941 and 1942.

Krebs returned to political life, becoming party chairman of the German Party and being elected to the City Council. He also sought readmission as a lawyer from 1950 to 1953, which was refused to him by the Hessian Ministry of Justice, among other things because of an anti-democratic and National Socialist spirit public speech given in 1952. It was not until November 1953, after he had resigned his mandate as a City Councillor and left the German Party, that he was readmitted to the bar and resumed work as a lawyer. He lost a legal dispute with the city from 1956 to 1961 over his pension as mayor; however, the city approved the pensions given by the district court council.

== Sources ==
- Klee, Ernst (2007). Das Personenlexikon zum Dritten Reich. Wer war was vor und nach 1945. Frankfurt-am-Main: Fischer-Taschenbuch-Verlag. ISBN 978-3-596-16048-8.
- Lilla, Joachim (2005). Der Preußische Staatsrat 1921–1933: Ein biographisches Handbuch. Düsseldorf: Droste Verlag. ISBN 978-3-770-05271-4.
