= Mayor of Frankfurt =

The Mayor of Frankfurt (German: Oberbürgermeister (male) or Oberbürgermeisterin (female), sometimes translated as "Lord Mayor") is the highest-ranking member of city government in Frankfurt, Germany. The mayor was traditionally elected by the city council. This system was replaced in 1995, and the position has been directly elected. Three people have won election since then: Petra Roth (CDU), Peter Feldmann (SPD) and Mike Josef (SPD). In November 2022, following a successful recall election against Feldmann, Nargess Eskandari-Grünberg (Green) was the interim mayor of Frankfurt for six months. Current mayor Mike Josef (SPD) assumed the office in May 2023 following the election with 51.7% of the votes against the CDU candidate Uwe Becker.

The mayor is "first among equals" on the city cabinet (Magistrat), and acts as the cabinet's spokesperson. The mayor is also responsible for the policies of local government departments and oversees the city's administration.

== History ==
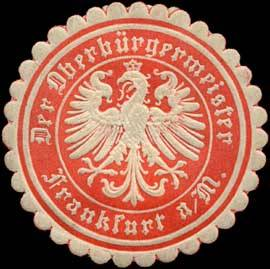
Siegelmarke ('seal mark') of the Oberbürgermeister of Frankfurt AM, used before 1923

The Free City of Frankfurt, as a state in the Holy Roman Empire and later the German Confederation, had various leadership structures, the most durable of which saw the city with two mayors: Senior Mayor (Ältere Bürgermeister) and Junior Mayor (Jüngere Bürgermeister). The present position of Oberbürgermeister was introduced in 1868 following the occupation of the city by the Kingdom of Prussia. Through the second half of the 19th century and first half of the 20th century, Frankfurt's mayors oversaw the development of Frankfurt into a major centre for trade and culture.

In 1933 following the appointment of Adolf Hitler as Chancellor of Germany, Ludwig Landmann – Frankfurt's first Jewish mayor – was expelled from the council, and Nazi Party member Friedrich Krebs was appointed in his place. Although the left-wing SPD and Communist Party had an overall majority on the council, they were excluded from the council session that confirmed Krebs' appointment.

Krebs remained in office until the US military captured the city in March 1945. The US military governorship that followed appointed trusted democrats as mayor to oversee the immediate denazification of the city administration and the beginnings of reconstruction. Council elections resumed in July 1946, and the SPD held the mayorship for the next thirty years. The rebuilding of Frankfurt was a significant topic in these years.

Following a statewide referendum, the office of mayor in Hesse became directly elected. Frankfurt's first mayoral election was held in 1995 and saw a surprise victory for CDU candidate Petra Roth over the incumbent Andreas von Schoeler (SPD). Since then, mayoral elections have been noted as especially personality-driven, and candidates regularly defy national party trends to become increasingly popular over the course of their mayoralty. Roth increased her majority over the course of her mayorship, winning in 2007 in the first round with 60.5% of the vote. After Roth resigned in 2012, Peter Feldmann (SPD) won a surprise victory over Boris Rhein (CDU), the Hessian interior minister, and he too saw a significant increase vote increase in his second election in 2018. Following various controversies, Feldmann faced a recall election in which he was recalled with 95.1% of the vote. Deputy Mayor Nargess Eskandari-Grünberg (Green) thus assumed the office and serves in a caretaker capacity until the next election scheduled for March 2023.

== Oberbürgermeister since 1868 ==
Since 1868 there have been 19 mayors of Frankfurt: 14 indirectly elected, 3 appointed and 2 directly elected.

Term		Image	Name	Party	Selection method
1868	1880		Daniel Heinrich Mumm von Schwarzenstein	Independent	Indirect election
1880	1890		Johannes von Miquel	National Liberal Party	Indirect election
1890	1912		Franz Adickes	Independent liberal	Indirect election
1912	1924		Georg Voigt	German Democratic Party	Indirect election
1924	1933		Ludwig Landmann	German Democratic Party	Indirect election
1933	1945		Friedrich Krebs	Nazi	Appointed by Nazi Party (Note: Krebs was later confirmed by a vote of the city council. However, only Nazi party members were allowed to vote – the left wing parties that held a majority on the council were excluded.)
1945	1945		Wilhelm Hollbach	Independent	Appointed by US military
1945	1946		Kurt Blaum	CDU	Appointed by US military
1946	1956		Walter Kolb	SPD	Indirect election
1956	1964		Werner Bockelmann	SPD	Indirect election
1964	1970		Willi Brundert	SPD	Indirect election
1970	1971		Walter Möller	SPD	Indirect election
1971	1977		Rudi Arndt	SPD	Indirect election
1977	1986		Walter Wallmann	CDU	Indirect election
1986	1989		Wolfram Brück	CDU	Indirect election
1989	1991		Volker Hauff	SPD	Indirect election
1991	1995		Andreas von Schoeler	SPD	Indirect election
1995	2012		Petra Roth	CDU	Direct election
2012	2022		Peter Feldmann	SPD	Direct election
2022	2023		Nargess Eskandari-Grünberg	Alliance 90/The Greens	Acting (Note: As the Bürgermeister (Deputy Mayor), Eskandari-Grünberg holds the mayorship between Feldmann's recall and the next election.)
2023	Incumbent		Mike Josef	SPD	Direct election

== Elections ==
The Mayor of Frankfurt is elected by the two-round system: if no candidate receives over 50% in the first round, a run-off is held between the top two candidates. The election is open to German and EU citizens over 18 years old who have lived in the city for at least three months. The mayor's term is 6 years – elections are brought forward if the mayor resigns or is otherwise removed from office.

=== 2023 ===
Frankfurt mayoral election, 2023
Party	Candidate	Votes	%	±%
CDU	Uwe Becker	70,411	34.5	+11.1
SPD	Mike Josef	49,033	24.0	−22.0
Greens	Manuela Rottmann	43,502	21.3	+12.0
Independent	Peter Wirth (Bahnbabo)	10,397	5.1	–
Left	Daniela Mehler-Würzbach	7,356	3.6	−5.2
Independent	Maja Wolff	6,014	2.9	–
FDP	Yankı Pürsün	5,768	2.8	–
AfD	Andreas Lobenstein	4,628	2.3	–
Citizens for Frankfurt (BFF)	Matthias Pfeiffer	1,565	0.8	–
PARTEI	Katharina Tanczos	1,176	0.6	−0.5
Team Todenhöfer	Khurrem Aktar	858	0.4	–
dieBasis	Frank Großenbach	744	0.4	–
Gartenpartei	Tilo Schwichtenberg	661	0.3	–
Independent	Sven Junghans	574	0.3	–
Independent	Niklas Pauli	340	0.2	–
Independent	Peter Pawelski	325	0.2	–
Independent	Feng Xu	199	0.1	–
Independent	Karl-Maria Schulte	158	0.1	–
Independent	Markus Eulig	102	0.0	–
Turnout		205,116	40.3	+2.7
Runoff election
SPD	Mike Josef	92,371	51.7%	
CDU	Uwe Becker	86,307	48.3%	
Turnout		180.442	35.4	
SPD hold				

=== 2022 recall referendum ===
Do you agree with the recall of the Mayor of Frankfurt am Main, Mr Peter Feldmann?
Choice	Votes	%
Yes	201,825	95.11
No	10,371	4.89
Total	212,196	100.00
Valid votes	212,196	99.69
Invalid/blank votes	667	0.31
Total votes	212,863	100.00
Registered voters/turnout	508,182	41.89
Turnout needed		30
Source: City of Frankfurt am Main

=== 2018 ===
Frankfurt mayoral election, 2018
Party	Candidate	Votes	%	±%
SPD	Peter Feldmann	86,823	46.0	+6.9
CDU	Bernadette Weyland	48,032	25.4	−13.7
Greens	Nargess Eskandari-Grünberg	17,648	9.3	−4.7
Left	Janine Wissler	16,669	8.8	+5.0
Independent	Volker Stein (Note: Stein was a member of the FDP, but did not secure the party's nomination.)	11,218	5.9	–
FW	Michael Weingärtner	2,832	1.5	–
PARTEI	Nico Wehneman	2,097	1.1	–
Independent	Karsten Schloberg	1,585	0.8	–
Independent	Ming Yang	938	0.5	–
Independent	Juli Wünsch	409	0.2	–
Independent	Felicia Herrschaft	340	0.2	–
Independent	Hein Fischer	169	0.1	–
Turnout		188,760	37.6	+0.1
Runoff election
SPD	Peter Feldmann	106,699	70.8%	
CDU	Bernadette Weyland	44,080	29.2%	
Turnout		152,804	30.2	
SPD hold				

=== 2012 ===
Frankfurt mayoral election, 2012
Party	Candidate	Votes	%	±%
CDU	Boris Rhein	67,253	39.1	−21.4
SPD	Peter Feldmann	56,744	33.0	+5.5
Greens	Rosemarie Heilig	23,987	14.0	–
Airport Expansion Opponents (FAG)	Ursula Fechter	6,828	4.0	–
Left	Janine Wissler	6,588	3.8	−2.1
Pirates	Herbert Förster	6,519	3.8	–
Independent	Oliver Maria Schmitt	3,009	1.8	–
Independent	Jean Jules Tatchouop	376	0.2	–
Independent	Harald Frenzel	357	0.2	–
Independent	Carl Maria Schulte	219	0.1	–
Turnout		173,722	37.5	+3.9
Runoff election
SPD	Peter Feldmann	93,232	57.4	
CDU	Boris Rhein	68,569	42.6	
Turnout		163,076	35.1	
SPD gain from CDU				

=== 2007 ===
Frankfurt mayoral election, 2007
Party	Candidate	Votes	%	±%
CDU	Petra Roth	86,785	60.5	+11.9
SPD	Franz Frey	39,410	27.5	−7.1
Left	Ulrich Wilken	8,495	5.9	+4.4
Citizens for Frankfurt (BFF)	Wolfgang Hübner	3,790	2.6	–
Independent	Horst Schäfer	1,910	1.3	–
NPD	Doris Zutt	1,171	0.8	–
REP	Rosemarie Lämmer	1,041	0.7	−1.1
Independent	Salvatore Ribaudo	549	0.4	–
Independent	Pasquale Aita	165	0.1	–
Independent	Kadim Sanli	163	0.1	–
Turnout		146,150	33.6	−13.5
CDU hold				

=== 2001 ===
Frankfurt mayoral election, 2001
Party	Candidate	Votes	%	±%
CDU	Petra Roth	92,313	48.6	−3.3
SPD	Achim Vandreike	65,836	34.6	−9.3
Greens	Jutta Ebeling	19,579	10.3	–
FDP	Hans-Joachim Otto	3,489	1.8	–
REP	Klaus Sauer	3,342	1.8	–
PDS	Eberhard Dähne	2,789	1.5	–
ÖkoLinX-ARL	Zorica Surla	989	0.5	–
fun	Claude Cazaré	662	0.3	–
FdS	Reinhold Müller	492	0.3	–
DMP	Harald Frenzel	280	0.1	–
Independent	Karl-Maria Schulte	269	0.1	+0.0
Turnout		193,747	46.1	−9.7
Runoff election
CDU	Petra Roth	89,149	53.1	
SPD	Achim Vandreike	78,823	46.9	
Turnout		169,310	40.2	
CDU hold				

=== 1995 ===
Frankfurt mayoral election, 1995
Party	Candidate	Votes	%
CDU	Petra Roth	110,087	51.9
SPD	Andreas von Schoeler	97,391	45.9
NPD	Günter Deckert	1,450	0.7
Independent	Thomas Bagatsch	685	0.3
PBC	Gerhard Heinzmann	524	0.2
Independent	Renate Ermel	515	0.2
ÖDP	Dietrich Buroh	511	0.2
Independent	Karl-Marie Schulte	259	0.1
Independent	Siegfried Niebert	249	0.1
Independent	Michael Weißbach	241	0.1
Independent	Alfred Steininger	91	0.1
Turnout		213,974	55.8
CDU win (new seat)			

== See also ==
- Timeline of Frankfurt
