= Volker Hauff =

German politician of the SPD (born 1940)

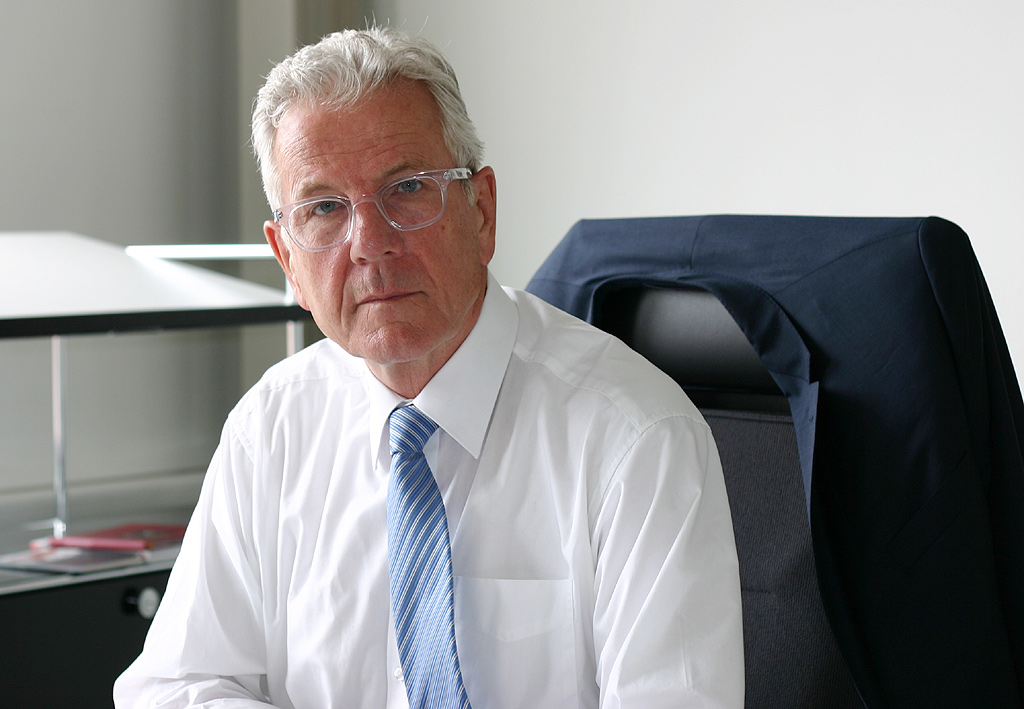
- Hauff in 2008

Mayor of Frankfurt
- In office 15 June 1989 – 11 March 1991
- Preceded by: Wolfram Brück
- Succeeded by: Andreas von Schoeler

Minister of Transport
- In office 6 November 1980 – 1 October 1982
- Chancellor: Helmut Schmidt
- Preceded by: Kurt Gscheidle
- Succeeded by: Werner Dollinger

Minister of Research and Technology
- In office 16 February 1978 – 4 November 1980
- Chancellor: Helmut Schmidt
- Preceded by: Hans Matthöfer
- Succeeded by: Andreas von Bülow

Member of the Bundestag; from Hesse
- In office 18 February 1987 – 14 June 1989
- Preceded by: Multi-member district
- Succeeded by: Klaus Kübler
- Constituency: State list

Member of the Bundestag; from Baden-Württemberg
- In office 20 October 1969 – 18 February 1987
- Constituency: See list: State list (1969–1972); Eßlingen (1972–1976); State list (1976–1980); Esslingen (1980–1983); State list (1983–1987)

Personal details
- Born: 9 August 1940 (age 85) Backnang, Nazi Germany
- Party: Social Democratic
- Education: Free University of Berlin

Volker Hauff (born 9 August 1940) is a German politician of the Social Democratic Party (SPD).

== Political career ==
Since 1959, Hauff has been a member of the SPD. From 1969 to 1989 he was a member of the Bundestag.

Hauff served as Federal Minister of Research and Technology from 1978 to 1980, Federal Minister of Transport from 1980 to 1982 and Mayor of Frankfurt am Main from 1989 to 1991. He is a descendant of the Swabian poet Wilhelm Hauff.

== Other activities ==
- German Council for Sustainable Development (RNE), Member (2001-2010, appointed ad personam by Chancellor Gerhard Schröder)

== Publications ==
- Energie-Wende. Von der Empörung zur Reform. Mit den neuesten Gutachten zum Ausstieg aus der Kernenergie (in German), vol. 3853, München: Droemersche Verlagsanstalt Knaur, 1986, ISBN 3-426-03853-6
- Global denken, lokal handeln. Ein politisches Fazit (in German), Köln: Kiepenheuer & Witsch, 1992, ISBN 3-462-02164-8
- als Herausgeber mit Günther Bachmann (2006), Unterm Strich. Erbschaften und Erblasten für das Deutschland von morgen. Eine Generationenbilanz (in German), München: Oekom Verlag, ISBN 3-86581-041-1
