= Nargess Eskandari-Grünberg =

German politician (born 1964)

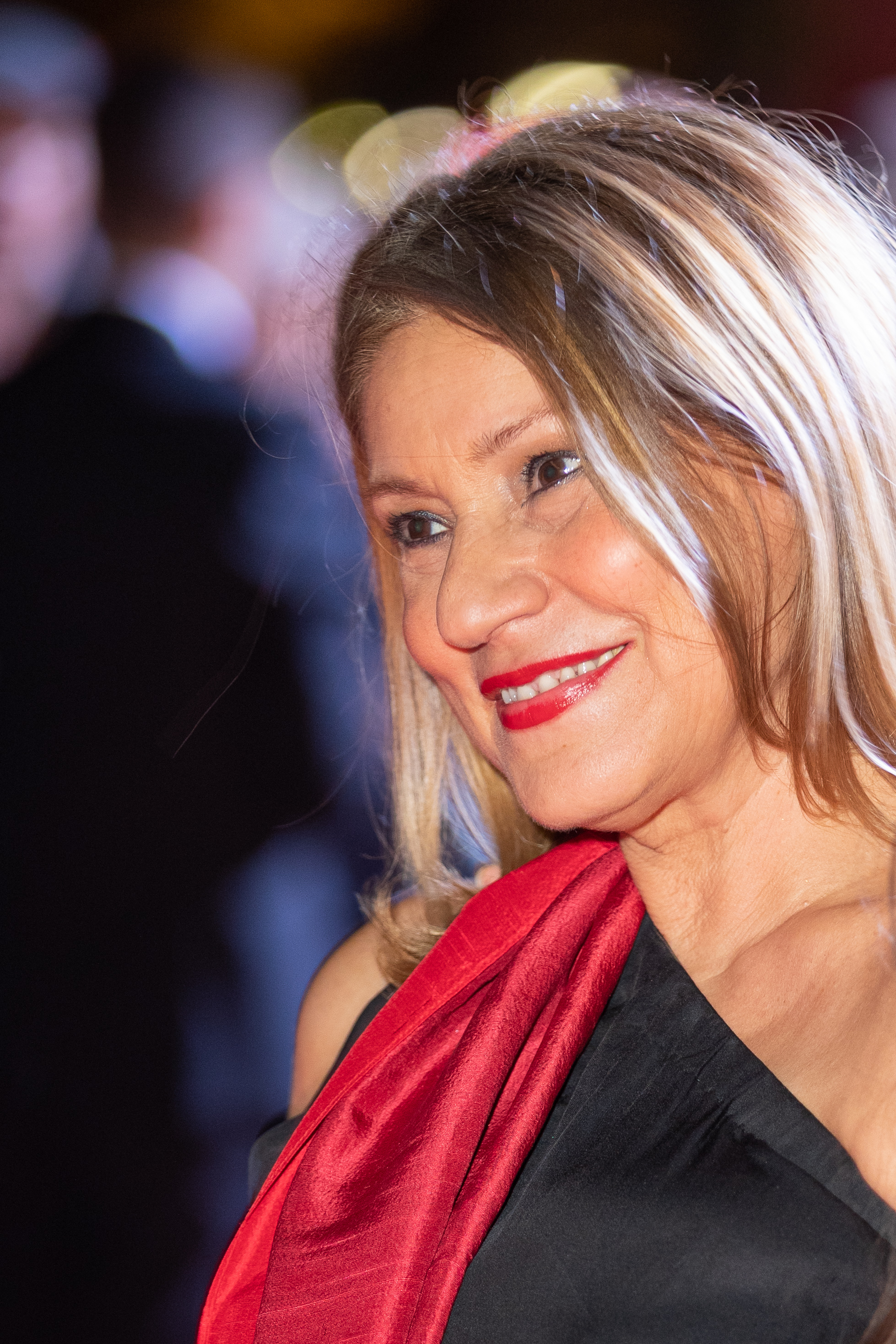
- Grünberg in 2019

Acting Mayor of Frankfurt
- In office 12 November 2022 – 15 May 2023
- Preceded by: Peter Feldmann
- Succeeded by: Mike Josef

Personal details
- Born: Nargess Eskandari; 20 February 1965 (age 61) Tehran, Pahlavi Iran
- Party: Alliance 90/The Greens
- Spouse: Kurt Grünberg
- Children: 2, including Maryam Zaree
- Profession: Psychotherapist; politician

Nargess Eskandari-Grünberg (Persian: نرگس اسکندری-گرونبرگ; born 20 February 1965) is a German politician for Alliance 90/The Greens. Since 2021 she has been Bürgermeisterin (deputy mayor) of Frankfurt am Main; following the recall of previous Oberbürgermeister (lord mayor) Peter Feldmann, she has acted as Mayor of Frankfurt on a caretaker basis from 12 November 2022 until the mayoral election in March 2023.

== Early life ==
Eskandari-Grünberg was born in 1965 in Tehran. As a high-school student she protested for the overthrow of the Shah; after the Iranian Revolution, she campaigned for democracy against the Ruhollah Khomeini regime. While still at school, she was arrested and imprisoned in Evin Prison, and while there gave birth to a daughter, Maryam, with a college student. She was released after a year and a half, and fled with her baby daughter to Germany, arriving in Frankfurt on Christmas Eve 1985.

Eskandari-Grünberg earned a doctorate and became a psychotherapist with the German Red Cross, and married fellow psychologist Kurt Grünberg, with whom she has a second child. Her daughter Maryam Zaree became an actress, known for roles in the film Shahada and the TV series 4 Blocks and Tatort among others. Eskandari-Grünberg was featured in Zaree's 2019 documentary Born in Evin, in which Zaree attempts to learn more about the circumstances of her mother's imprisonment and her own birth, and which won the 2020 German Film Award for Best Documentary Film.

== Political career ==
In 2001, Eskandari-Grünberg joined Frankfurt City Council as a councillor for The Greens, and from 2008 to 2016, she sat on the city cabinet as the Head of Department for Integration. In the 2018 mayoral election, she ran as the Green candidate and finished third with 9.3% of the vote.

After the 2021 Frankfurt local elections, in which the Greens finished first, Eskandari-Grünberg was chosen as the Bürgermeisterin (Deputy Mayor) as well as the Head of Department for Diversity, Anti-discrimination and Social Cohesion. Following the successful recall election against Lord Mayor of Frankfurt Peter Feldmann, (Note: Feldmann's term in office expired on 11 November 2022 "at the end of that day") Eskandari-Grünberg took over the role of lord mayor on 12 November 2022, and will be the caretaker until the next election, expected to be held in March 2023.

Eskandari-Grünberg is not religious and is skeptical of Islamic teaching and the role of women in Islam, campaigning unsuccessfully for a headscarf ban in public buildings, but also defends freedom of religion and supports a "critical dialogue" with Muslims. After defending immigration and the construction of a mosque in Frankfurt, Eskandari-Grünberg became the target of a Neo-Nazi intimidation campaign.

== Mahsa Amini protests ==
Eskandari-Grünberg has been a vocal critic of the human rights situation in Iran and called for sanctions against the country. During the Mahsa Amini protests in Iran in 2022, Eskandari-Grünberg organised and led demonstrations in support of Iranian feminists in Frankfurt.
