= Wolfram Brück =

German politician of the CDU

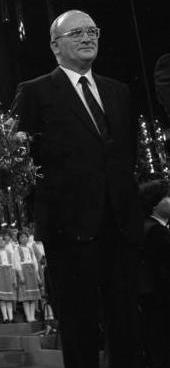
- Brück at a Christmas party in 1986

Mayor of Frankfurt
- In office 14 August 1986 – 1989
- Preceded by: Walter Wallmann
- Succeeded by: Volker Hauff

Personal details
- Born: 27 February 1937 Mülheim, Cologne, Germany
- Died: 15 June 2016 (aged 79) Cologne, Germany
- Party: Christian Democratic Union (CDU)

Wolfram Brück (27 February 1937 – 15 June 2016) was a German lawyer politician of the Christian Democratic Union (CDU) who served as the Mayor of Frankfurt between 1986 and 1989. He took over the role of mayor after Walter Wallmann left office to serve in the federal government, and his tenure lasted until the next local election in 1989 in which the CDU lost its majority in the Landtag of Hesse.

== Life ==
Brück was born in Cologne, where he attended secondary school. He graduated from school in 1957 and then studied law at the from 1957 to 1961 at the universities of Cologne and Freiburg. Brück worked as a legal clerk for four years after graduating from university before working as a court assessor at the Higher Regional Court of Cologne. Brück was a state prosecutor in Koblenz from 1968 until 1970, specialising in monetary crimes. Between 1970 and 1977 he was a ministry official of the German Bundestag.

== Political career ==
Brück was a member of the CDU from 1957 until his death. He served on the district council for Mayen-Koblenz for four years starting in 1970, after which he served on the city council of Andernach. In 1977, he was elected to the Magistrate of the City of Frankfurt am Main as Head of Personnel and Legal Affairs.

In 1986, the incumbent Mayor of Frankfurt Walter Wallmann joined the Second Kohl cabinet as the Federal Ministry for the Environment, Nature Conservation, Nuclear Safety and Consumer Protection, thus leaving the office of mayor. Brück then succeeded Wallmann as mayor on 14 August 1986, after being recommended by Wallman as his replacement.

Brück found himself in the national spotlight in September 1986 after having postponed the opening of the U6 and U7 lines of the Frankfurt U-Bahn following a political dispute with the regional council of Darmstadt and a citizen's initiative against the expansion of rail networks in the city centre. Brück's tenure saw the opening of high-rise buildings such as the Messeturm and Westendstrasse 1, as well as the creation of city partnerships with Toronto (Canada) and Guangzhou (China). Brück also inaugurated the popular Museumsuferfest.

In 1989 Brück faced his first election (he had not come to power through election, but due to the resignation of his predecessor), which he lost; the CDU lost 13 percentage points from the last election in 1986, and the SPD became the largest party with a vote share of 40.1%. The SPD then formed a coalition with The Greens, and SPD politician Volker Hauff became the new Mayor of Frankfurt.

== Later life ==
A year after his election defeat, Brück moved back to his home city of Cologne, and settled there as a lawyer. He served as the chairman of the board of the recycling company Duales System from 1991 until his retirement in 2002. Duales System was the company which introduced the "Grüner Punkt", the forerunner of the "Green Dot" symbol for recycling. Brück received the Order of Merit of the Federal Republic of Germany for his work on the "Grüner Punkt". In 2016 Brück died aged 79.
