= Petra Roth =

German politician of the CDU

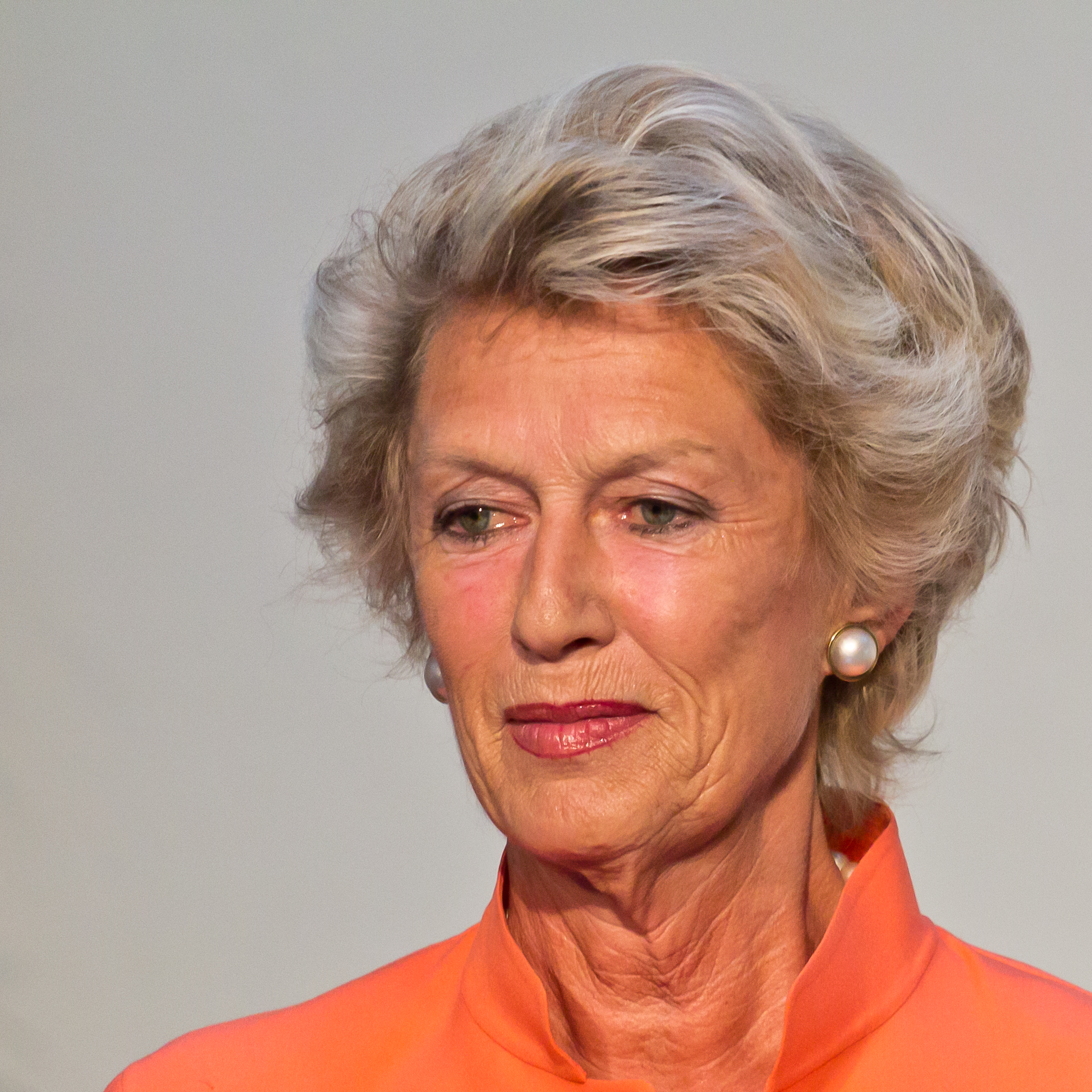
Roth in 2012

Petra Roth (born 9 May 1944 in Bremen) is a German politician of the Christian Democratic Union (CDU). She was the Mayor of Frankfurt from 1995 to 2012. In addition she twice served as president of the Deutscher Städtetag, resuming her previous post there in 2009. The group is the head organization and lobby group for all German cities vis-à-vis the Cabinet of Germany, the German Bundestag, the Bundesrat of Germany, the European Union (EU) and many organizations.

== Life ==
Roth is descended from a Bremen-based family of merchants. After she left the Kippenberg-Gymnasium, which has a special concentration in music, with a General Certificate of Secondary Education, she completed an apprenticeship as a medical secretary. Later she passed her exam at an upper business school. Love led her from Bremen to Frankfurt am Main. She is described as interested in the arts. She has two sons and has been widowed since 1994.

== Political career ==
=== Early beginnings ===
Petra Roth joined the Christian Democratic Union in 1972 after she had moved to Frankfurt. Later she was elected to the local city council and between 1987 and 1995, to the Landtag of Hesse. Between 1992 and 1995 she was chair of the CDU in Frankfurt.

=== Mayor of Frankfurt, 1995−2012 ===
On 25 June 1995, Roth was elected mayor of Frankfurt, defeating the incumbent Andreas von Schoeler and becoming the city's first directly elected woman mayor.

In 2001, she won the second round in a tight race against Achim Vandreike (SPD). Meanwhile, Roth is longest-serving Frankfurt mayor since World War II.

She was also a passenger on a flight that was diverted to the Newfoundland town of Gander during the week following the September 11 attacks.

On 28 January 2007, Roth was re-elected in the first round with 60.5% of the votes but with voter participation of only 33.6%. Her rival candidate Franz Frey (SPD) got 27.5% of the votes.

Roth was briefly considered as a potential successor to Federal President Johannes Rau. In March 2008 she was considered a potential candidate for Minister-President of the State of Hesse.

From 1997 to 1999 and from 2003 to 2005, Roth served as president of Deutscher Städtetag, a position she took up again in 2009. She was also member of the Committee of the Regions of European Union.

During her time in office, Roth was a member of the board of Frankfurt International Airport Fraport, chairman of the supervisory boards of the Frankfurt trade fair Messe Frankfurt, of the municipal utility company Stadtwerke Frankfurt am Main, of the regional transport services company Rhein-Main-Verkehrsverbund, and the regional housing society ABG Frankfurt Holding.

== Political positions ==
Within the CDU, Roth is considered a proponent of religious tolerance and a moderate stance regarding topics such as building of mosques in Germany, migration and integration, as well as drug treatment policy.

Ahead of the Christian Democrats’ leadership election in 2018, Roth publicly endorsed Friedrich Merz to succeed Angela Merkel as the party’s chair.

== Other activities ==
=== Corporate boards ===
- AXA Konzern AG, Member of the Supervisory Board (since 2012)
- Deutsche Vermögensberatung (DVAG), Member of the Advisory Board
- Thüga, Member of the Supervisory Board
- Helaba, Ex-Officio Member of the Supervisory Board (-2012)

=== Non-profits ===
- German Cancer Research Center (DKFZ), Member of the Advisory Council
- Commerzbank Foundation, Member of the Board of Trustees
- Hertie-Stiftung, Member of the Board of Trustees (since 2012)
- Jewish Museum Frankfurt, Member of the Board of Trustees
- Max Planck Institute for European Legal History, Member of the Board of Trustees (since 2011)
- Senckenberg Nature Research Society, Member of the Board of Trustees
- Schirn Kunsthalle Frankfurt, Member of the Board of Trustees
- BHF Bank Foundation, Member of the Board of Trustees

== Recognition ==
=== Honorary degrees ===
- 2005 – Honorary doctorate from Tel Aviv University
- 2010 – Honorary doctorate from the Sookmyung Women's University

=== Awards ===
- 2001 – Légion d'honneur
- 2012 – Julius Campe Prize
- 2012 – Konrad Adenauer Prize
- 2015 – Order of Merit of the Federal Republic of Germany
- 2016 – Honorary citizenship of Tel Aviv
- 2016 – Alfred Dregger Medal
- 2017 – Honorary citizenship of Frankfurt

Political offices
Preceded by Andreas von Schoeler	Mayor of Frankfurt; 5 July 1995 – 30 June 2012	Succeeded by Peter Feldmann
