= Andreas von Schoeler =

German politician of the SPD (born 1948)

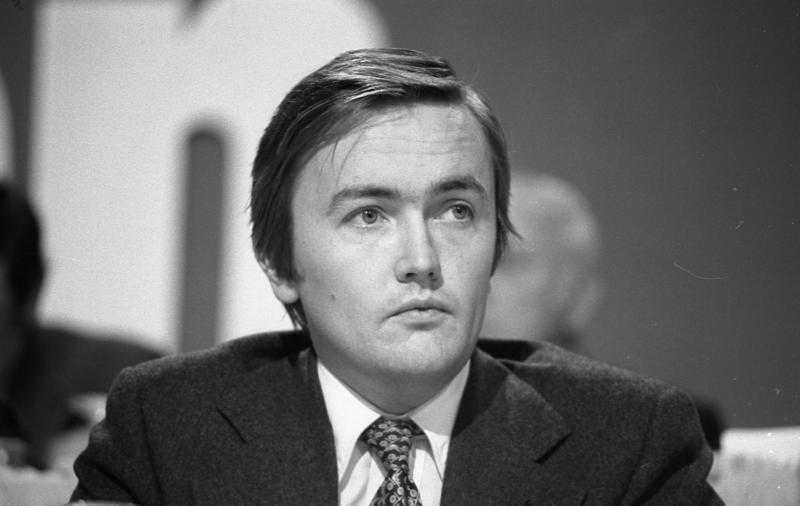
- Von Schoeler in 1975

Mayor of Frankfurt
- In office 8 May 1991 – 19 April 1995
- Preceded by: Volker Hauff
- Succeeded by: Petra Roth

Personal details
- Born: July 4, 1948 (age 77) Bad Homburg, Germany
- Party: SPD (1982–present)
- Other political affiliations: FDP (1966–1982)

Andreas von Schoeler (born 4 July 1948) is a German politician of the Social Democratic Party of Germany (SPD). He served as the Parliamentary State Secretary for the Federal Ministry of the Interior and Community from 1976 to 1982 and later as the Mayor of Frankfurt between 1991 and 1995. Von Schoeler was the last mayor to serve before the introduction of direct elections in 1995.

== Political career ==
Von Schoeler joined the Free Democratic Party of Germany (FDP) aged 18. He served in the Bundestag between 1972 and 1982. On 16 December 1976, von Schoeler was chosen to be the Parliamentary State Secretary for the Minister of the Interior, Werner Maihofer. He served in this position until 17 September 1982, when the ruling SPD-FDP coalition collapsed. Von Schoeler was one of several FDP politicians who left the party in what was known as the "Wende" ("turning point").

After leaving the FDP to join the SPD, von Schoeler attempted to re-enter the Bundestag on the SPD party list, but failed and was not elected.

In 1984, von Schoeler joined the Hessen State Cabinet of Holger Börner as the State Secretary of the Interior. After the SPD was defeated in the 1987 elections, von Schoeler left this position. After a brief stint working for Sony, Von Schoeler became the Head of Personnel, Legal and Economic Affairs in Frankfurt am Main in 1989, and replaced Volker Hauff as Mayor of Frankfurt in 1991. When he became mayor, von Schoeler was the youngest mayor in the history of Frankfurt at 43 years old.

As Mayor of Frankfurt von Schoeler led Frankfurt's campaign to be the location for the future European Central Bank. He encouraged the internationalisation of the Messe Frankfurt trade fair. During von Schoeler's term in office, new high-rise buildings were planned, and a new drug policy initiated, which focused on help for addicts and police measures to break up the open drug scene in the city; von Schoeler's government was elected with the promise of dealing with the city's drug problem.

He also arranged for Frankfurt to become the first major German city to allow a private network operate to set up a private fibre-optic network in the city area.

In 1995, the SPD-Green Party coalition which held power in Frankfurt fell apart; von Schoeler then left office to pave the way for new elections, and lost in the first direct election for Mayor of Frankfurt with 45.9% of the vote to Petra Roth's 51.1%. Roth went on to serve as mayor until 2012.

== Later life ==
Since 2009, von Schoeler has been involved in the Society of Friends and Patrons of the Jewish Museum Frankfurt, and was chairman of the board until 2021. Under von Schoeler's leadership the museum expanded significantly.
