= Council of Orthodox Rabbis of Greater Detroit =

The Council of Orthodox Rabbis of Greater Detroit, also known as "the Detroit Vaad" or simply "the Vaad" are the central rabbinic authority for the Metro Detroit Area, in the US state of Michigan. They describe themselves on their website as "the Detroit community's Orthodox rabbinic body dedicated to providing communal services that support Torah-community living".

== Functions ==
=== Kosher services ===
The Council of Orthodox Rabbis of Greater Detroit oversees kosher certification in the Detroit Metro Area, which includes certifications for retail food establishments, commercial production, restaurants, and other kosher food establishments in the area. The Detroit Vaad has its own hechsher to signal food that is considered "kosher" to the Vaad's standards.

The Detroit Vaad has been accused of creating a monopoly in the Kosher food industry of Greater Detroit. A kosher supermarket known as "The Grove" (formerly One Stop Kosher) is currently the only fully kosher supermarket in the state of Michigan, however, in 2006, there was an attempt to open another kosher supermarket in Detroit, which was quickly shut down because the Vaad refused to certify the store as kosher. Critics of the Vaad claim this refusal to certify the store was done to retain the Grove's monopoly on Kosher meat sales, rather than for religious concerns.

=== Beis din ===
The Council of Orthodox Rabbis of Greater Detroit also functions as a beis din, which performs dinei torah (dispute adjudication), geirus (conversions), and gittin (divorces). Members of the Vaad's beis din who judge any particular case are not necessarily employees of the Vaad.

The headquarters of the Council of Orthodox Rabbis of Greater Detroit is located at 18877 West 10 Mile Road, Suite 101, Southfield, Michigan 48075.
