= Franz Adickes =

German politician

Mayor of Frankfurt
- In office 14 October 1890 – 1 October 1912
- Preceded by: Johannes von Miquel
- Succeeded by: Georg Voigt

Personal details
- Born: 19 February 1846 Harsefeld, Kingdom of Hanover
- Died: 4 February 1915 (aged 68) Frankfurt, German Empire
- Party: Independent Liberal
- Spouse: Sophie Therese Lambert
- Children: 4

Franz Bourchard Ernst Adickes was a German politician. He was the mayor of Dortmund from 1873 to 1876, the mayor of Altona from 1876 to 1879, and mayor of Frankfurt from 14 October 1890 to 1 October 1912.

Adickes is considered one of the most important in the history of Frankfurt due to his tenure during the founding period, an important time in Frankfurt's urban development. In the history of Frankfurt, Adickes has the longest tenure as mayor.

== Family ==
Adickes is the brother of German philosopher Erich Adickes.

On 27 September 1873, Adickes married Sophie Therese Lambert (1848-1922) and they had four children:

- Friedrich, the only son, died in July 1874 at the age of four days.
- Theodore (1875-1945), married Dr. Ludwig Rottenberg (1864-1932), a Frankfurt composer and first conductor of the Frankfurt Opera in 1895. Her daughter, Gertrud (1900-1967) married the Frankfurt composer Paul Hindemith.
- Gertrud (1878-1960), married the business magnate and politician Alfred Hugenberg (1865-1951) in 1900 and together had a son and three daughters.
- Erika (1889-1960), married Karl Eisenlohr.

== Political career ==
Adickes studied law in Heidelberg, Munich and Göttingen from 1864 to 1867. In July 1873, shortly after his Second State Exam, he was unanimously elected mayor of Dortmund, a position he served for three years. In 1876, Adickes was appointed as the second mayor in the Prussian city of Altona, succeeding Friedrich Thaden. As mayor, Adickes developed the city to compete with neighboring Hamburg.

The Frankfurt city council elected Adickes on 14 October 1890 as mayor. He assisted the establishment of the Festhalle art museum. He was an important figure in the founding of Johann Wolfgang Goethe University in 1914. He also achieved the establishment of an efficient airport.

== Death and legacy ==
Adickes died two and a half years after the end of his term as mayor of Frankfurt.

In 1912, he was appointed honorary citizen of the city of Frankfurt, and in 1914 was awarded the title "Real Geheimer Rat", a symbolic honor for the highest officials in Prussia.

On 25 October 1916, a bust was unveiled in the atrium of the new university for the university founder, who died the previous year.

In 1996, on the occasion of Adickes' 150th birthday, the Institute of Urban History organized the exhibition Breakthrough to Modernity.
