= Römer =

City Hall of Frankfurt

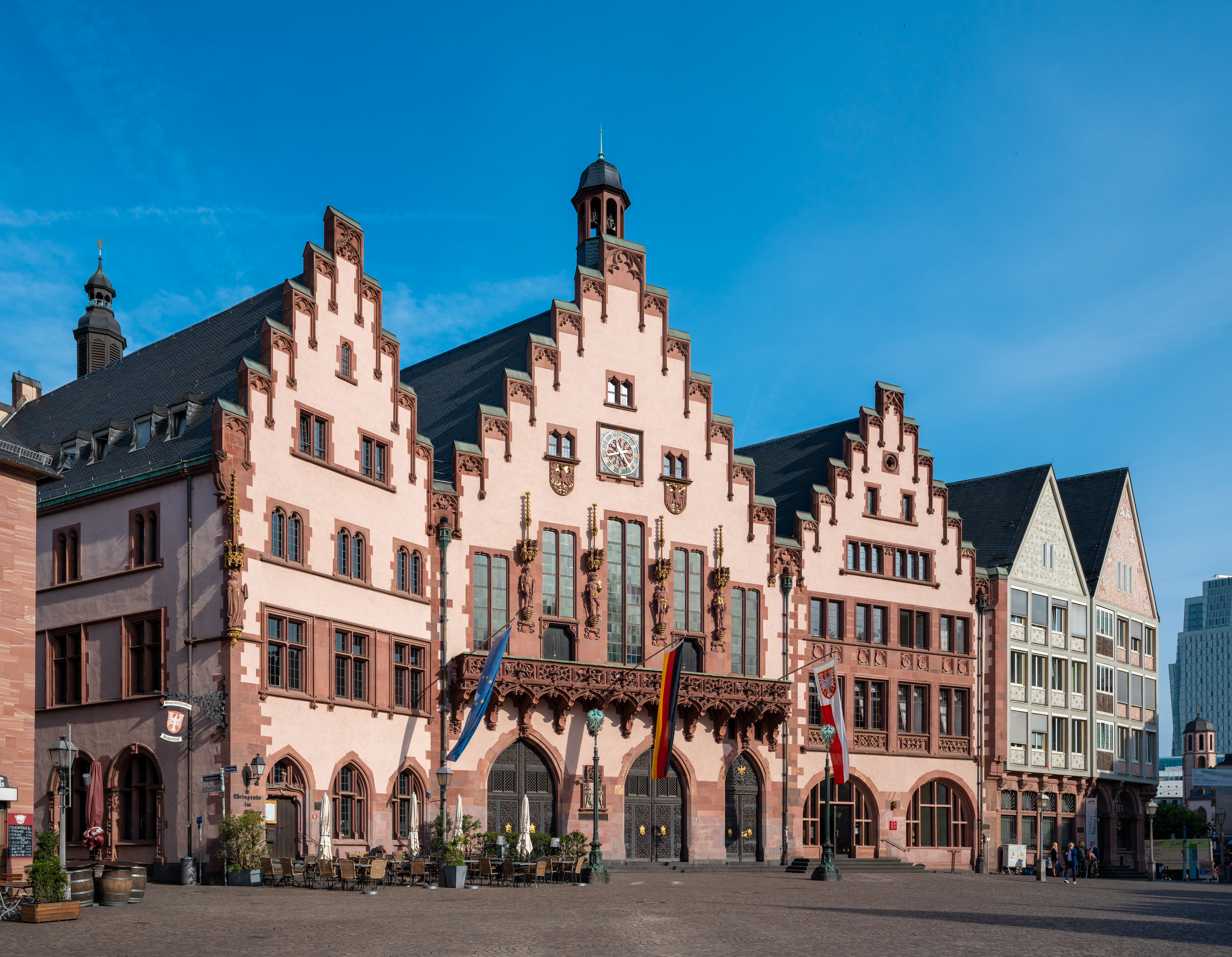
- The Römer's eastern facade

General information
- Status: Rebuild
- Type: City hall
- Architectural style: Neogothic front
- Location: Altstadt, Römerberg 23, Frankfurt, Germany
- Coordinates: 50°06′37″N 8°40′54″E
- Current tenants: Mayor of Frankfurt; City Council; Standesamt
- Opened: 11 March 1405; 621 years ago
- Inaugurated: 1955 (re-inauguration)
- Destroyed: 22 March 1944
- Cost: Houses "Zum Römer" and "Zum Goldenen Schwan" acquired for 800 Guilders
- Owner: City of Frankfurt

Technical details
- Structural system: nine contiguous houses, six courtyards
- Floor area: 10,000 m^{2} (110,000 ft^{2})

Design and construction
- Known for: Kaisersaal, balcony used as a public stage, Römerhalle, Schwanenhalle

Other information
- Public transit: Dom/Römer; 11, 12, 14 Römer/Paulskirche

The Römer (German surname, "Roman") is a medieval building in the Altstadt of Frankfurt am Main, Germany, and one of the city's most important landmarks. The Römer is located opposite the Old St. Nicholas Church and has been the city hall (Rathaus) of Frankfurt for over 600 years. The Römer merchant family sold it together with a second building, the Goldener Schwan (Golden Swan), to the city council on 11 March 1405 and it was converted for use as the city hall. The Haus Römer is actually the middle building of a set of three located in the Römerberg plaza.

The Römer is not a museum as it is occasionally used by the city for various purposes, for example as a Standesamt or civil registration office; the wedding rooms are located in the first and second floor of the Haus Löwenstein.

The former old town quarter between the Römer and St. Bartholomew's Cathedral has been redeveloped as the Dom-Römer Quarter until 2018, including several reconstructions of historical buildings that were destroyed during World War II.

== Extensions ==
The building complex has been continuously extended over the years, with eventually eleven houses connected to each other, resulting in a rather confusing interior. At the beginning of the 19th century, Frankfurt historian Anton Kirschner remarked that the Frankfurt city hall had "stairs, yards, halls and rooms in a labyrinthian mixture".

In 1424, the city bought the Frauenrode house, in 1510 the Viole house and in 1542 the Schwarzenfels house, which were all architecturally connected to the main complex.

Then, in 1596 the city council bought the Wanebach house, which stood next to the Goldener Schwan, as well as the building to the left of the Haus Römer, the Haus Löwenstein, and had both of them connected to the Römer. These construction projects were very complicated, since the floor heights of Löwenstein and Römer were radically different.

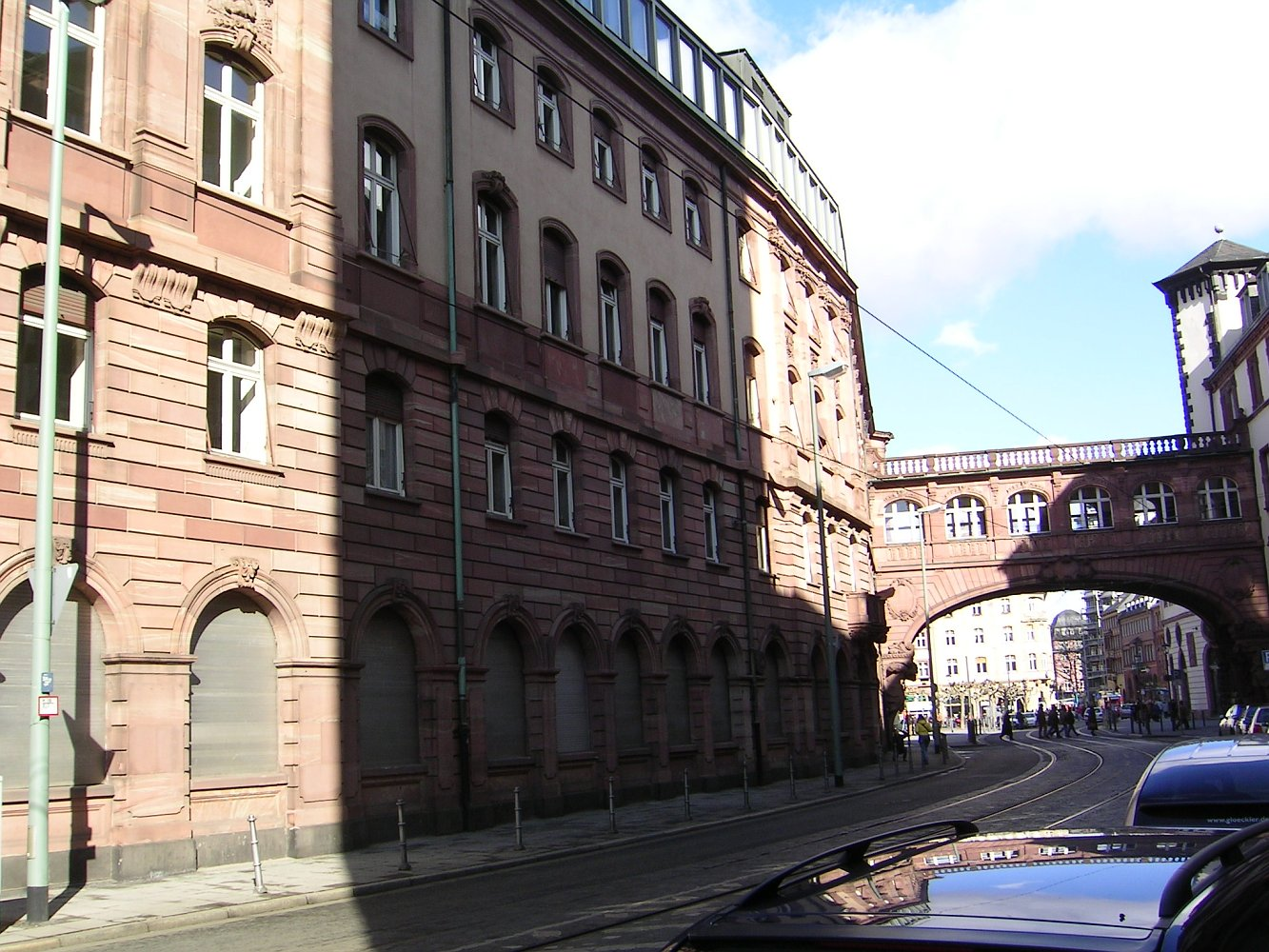
The north wing with the Seufzerbrücke

In 1843, the Frauenstein house and the Salzhaus for 32,000 Guilders were added. Finally, in 1878 the city bought the Alt-Limpurg house to the right of the Haus Römer. The current neogothic front with a balcony was built from 1896 more imposing, but mayor Franz Adickes decided against Kaiser Wilhelm's suggestion and had the front designed in a more welcoming manner.

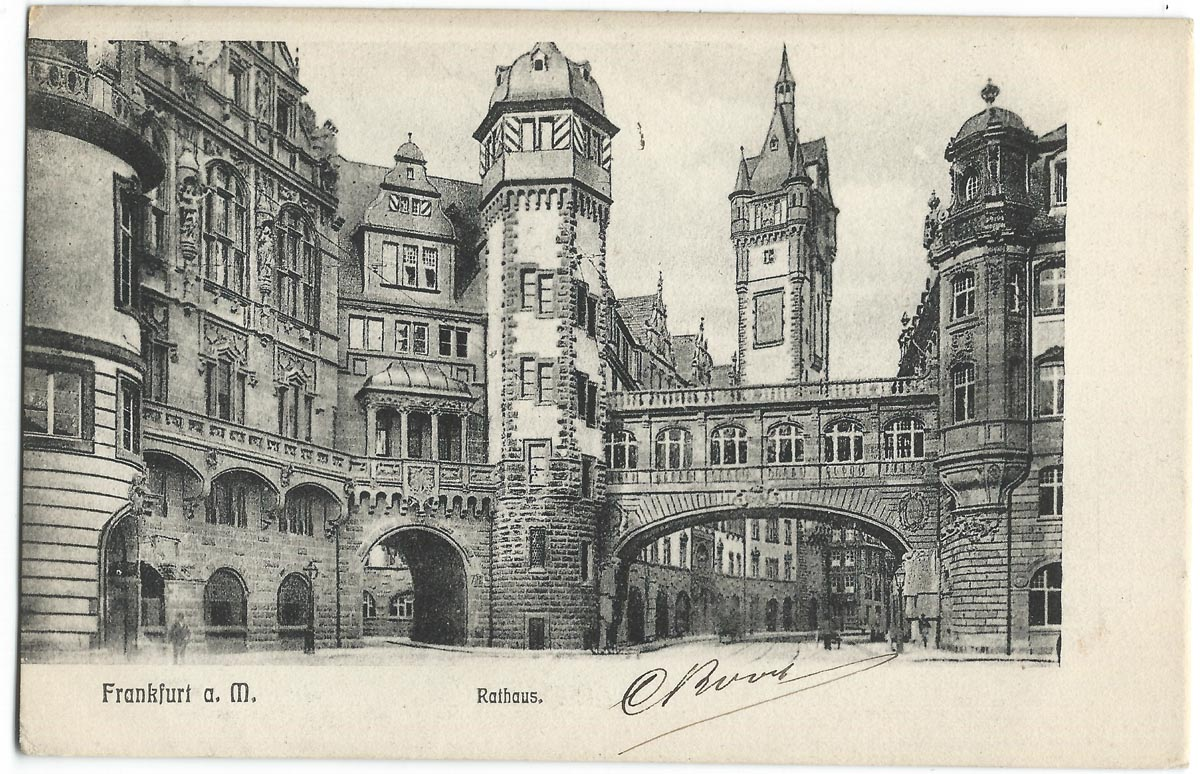
Neues Rathaus with the tower Langer Franz, ca. 1905

At the same time, the houses Frauenrode and Viole were demolished to make way for streets through the city centre. They were replaced by a newly erected building to the east. This new building is divided into two wings by the Braubachstrasse. These two wings (the north wing and south wing) are connected by a bridge. The Frankfurt citizens, who paid their taxes in the north wing, named the covered bridge the Seufzerbrücke (the "Bridge of Sighs") in reference to the other Bridge of Sighs in Venice. The two towers in the south wing attracted nicknames as well: the larger one was called Langer Franz (Tall Franz) in homage to the city's tall mayor and the smaller one the Kleiner Cohen (Small Cohen) after a popular song of the time.

On the night of 22 March 1944, the Römer, along with the rest of the centre of Frankfurt, was largely destroyed in one of the heaviest Allied bombing attacks of the Second World War. When the building was rebuilt after the war, the Alt-Limpurg, the Römer, and the Löwenstein houses, whose roof structure had in part withstood the attack, were restored in a simplified form. The completely destroyed houses Frauenstein and Salzhaus were rebuilt in a simplified style. The Löwenstein house has an open stairwell. The Römer was re-inaugurated in 1955 by president Theodor Heuss.

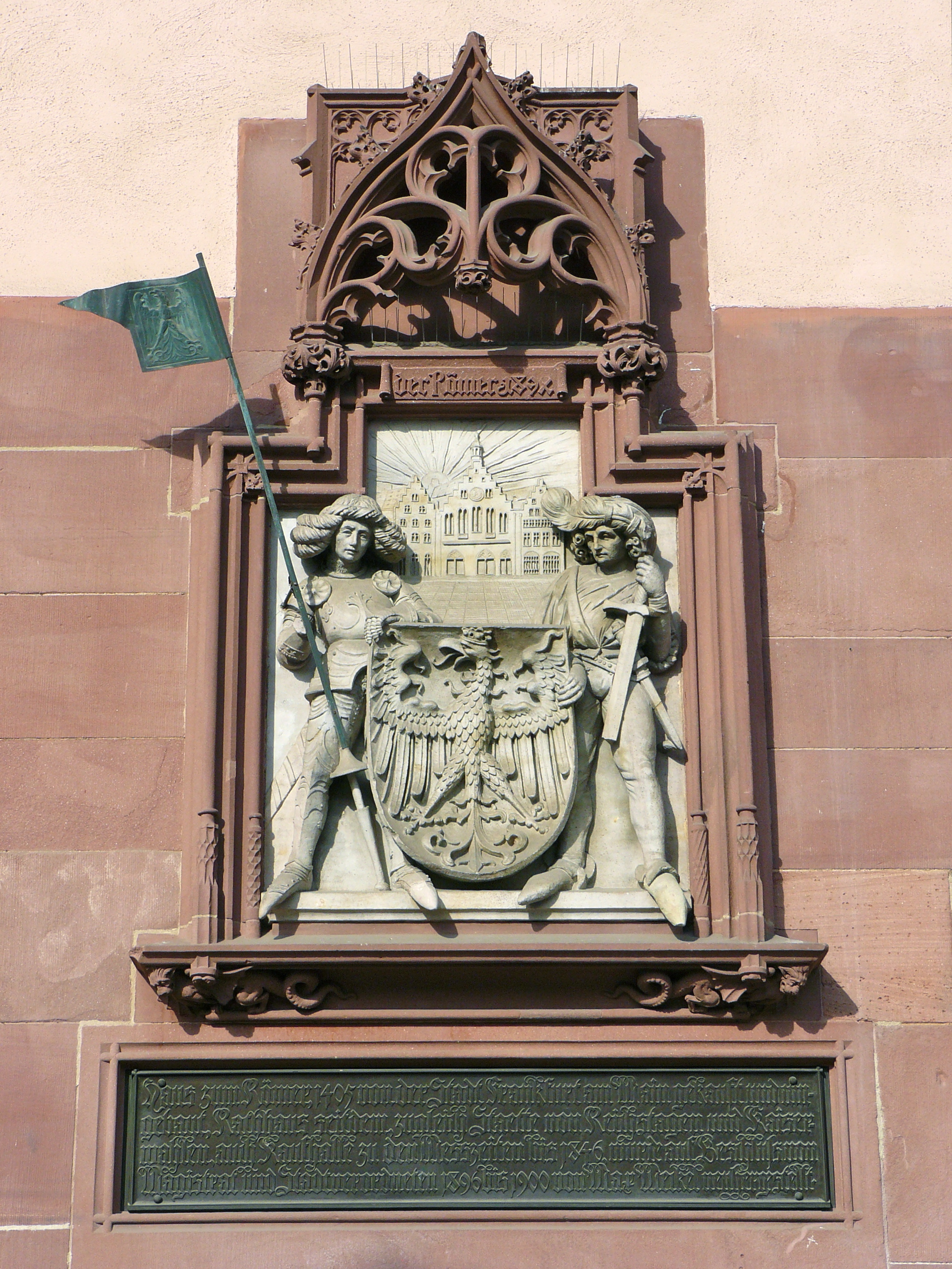
This wall relief was added when the Römer was rebuilt

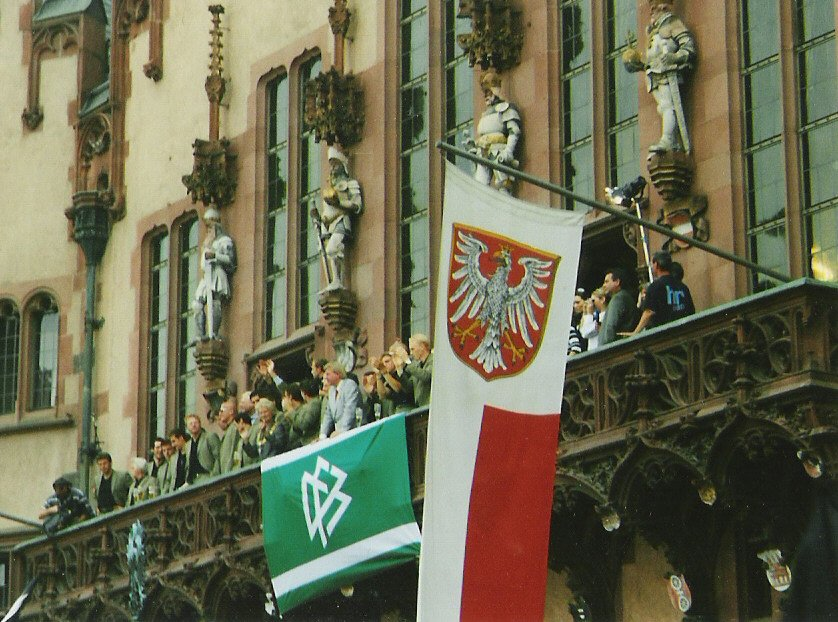
The balcony

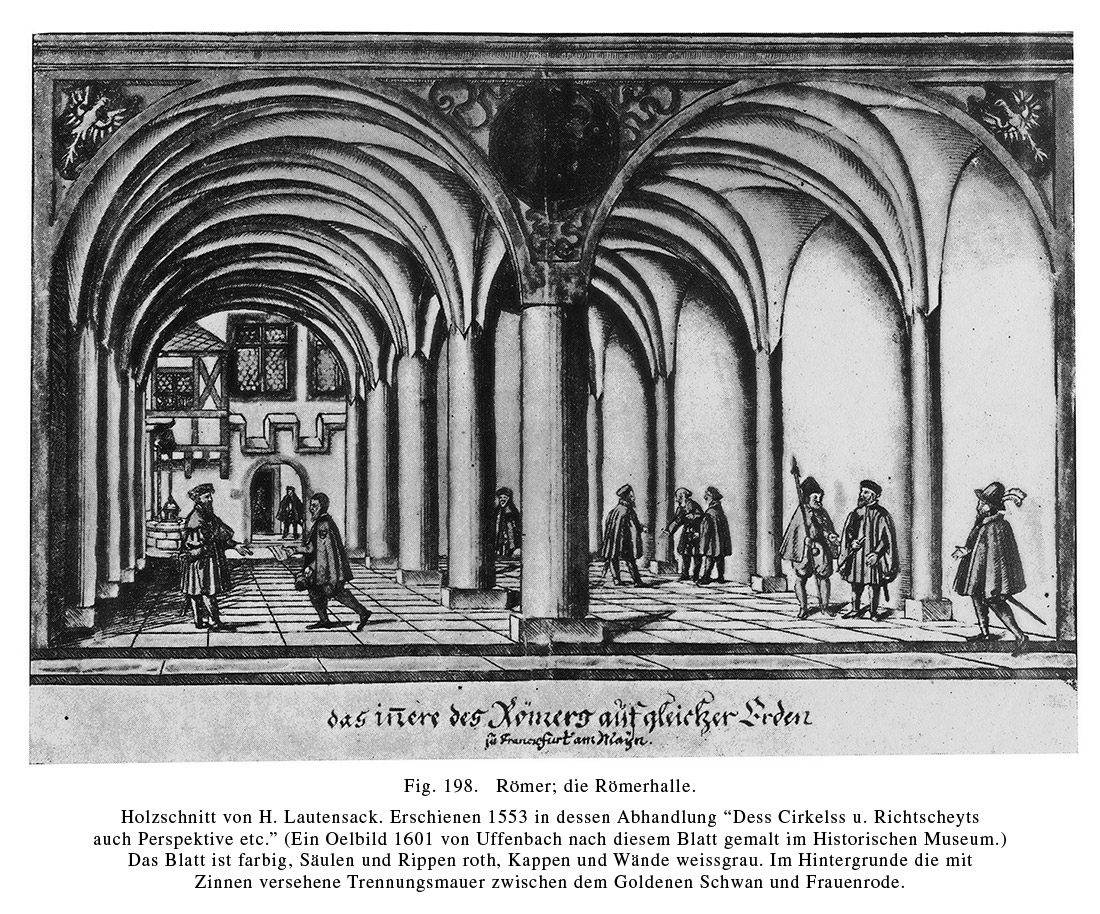
Entrance of the Römerhalle, 1553

In the following decades the façade was restored two additional times, in the years 1974 and 2005, and the houses on the Römerberg regained the neogothic look of 1900. The interior has also been redesigned. In 1988 the renovated city council meeting hall was completed.

== Architecture ==
The entire three-storey building complex occupies about 10,000 square metres and consists of nine houses, encircling six courtyards. The front, with today's main entrance, faces the Römerberg plaza. Other streets around the Römer are the Limpurgergasse to the south and the Buchgasse and the Berliner Straße to the north. The Braubachstraße divides the south and north wings.

=== Façade ===
The exterior features of the set of buildings reflect a wide breadth of Frankfurt and Germany's history, even though they were designed at the beginning of the 20th century. The famous three-peaked façade has medieval elements of design. The left-hand corner of the Alt-Limpurg displays the so-called Frankfurtia, the female embodiment of the city. In the middle, the Haus Römer shows the four kaisers of the Holy Roman Empire, two city coats of arms, a clock face, and a placard describing the most important facts about the building. The four kaisers are Frederick Barbarossa (the first king to be elected in Frankfurt), Louis the Bavarian (who gave convention rights to the city and allowed an expansion of the city), Charles IV (who made Frankfurt the location of the Kaiser selection vote), and Maximilian II (the first kaiser to be crowned in Frankfurt cathedral).

Like the neogothic façade, the balcony was added after the rebuilding in 1900, replacing a wooden roof. The balcony was and is used as a public stage for state visits and sporting events – for example, the soccer world champions in the Women's World Cup in 2003 and the runners up in the 2002 FIFA World Cup.

Another approach was chosen for the design of the fronts of the two north-east houses (the Wanebach and the Salzhaus). In contrast to the other houses in the complex, instead of reconstructing the old Wilhelminean front, the architects created a completely new design using a combination of medieval timber framing and modern styles. The mosaics in the timber frames feature the motif of a phoenix, a symbol for modern Frankfurt's new start after the war.

=== Rooms ===
==== Römerhalle and Schwanenhalle ====
These two halls are the oldest remaining rooms in the building and are virtually unchanged after 600 years. At one point, the first Frankfurt book fairs took place in these rooms and gold and silversmiths sold their merchandise there. After the Second World War, the rooms continued to be used for this purpose because the massively built structures had survived the war practically undamaged. The two halls are located on the ground floor of the houses Römer and Goldener Schwan, and they can be entered directly from the main entrance on the Römerberg.

==== Kaisersaal ====
Perhaps the best-known room of the Römer, the Kaisersaal, or Emperor Hall, is located above the Römerhalle on the second floor and is a major tourist attraction. During the Holy Roman Empire, coronation banquets took place there. Today, the Kaisersaal is well known for its unique and unparalleled collection of 19th century portraits of all of the emperors, including works by Eduard von Steinle of Albert I and Ferdinand III.

Römer Frankfurt
Römer, town hall Frankfurt am Main
1 Zum Römer
2 Löwenstein
3 Frauenstein
4 Salzhaus
5 Wanebach
6 Zum goldenen Schwan
7 Bürgersaalbau
8 Silberberg
9 Alt-Limpurg / Laderam
10 Neues Rathaus (new town hall)
11 Seufzerbrücke (bridge of sighs)
12 Römerberg (square)
13 Paulsplatz (square)

== See also ==
- Mayor of Frankfurt
- Altstadt (Frankfurt am Main)
