= Eschwege displaced persons camp =

The displaced persons camp of Eschwege, a former German air force base in the Frankfurt district of the American-occupied zone, became a displaced persons (DP) camp in January 1946.

The camp housed approximately 1,770 Jews at the time of its opening and its young population quickly developed a revitalized community, evidenced by the opening of a kindergarten with 50 children by April 1947. In contrast, the elementary school had only 30 students at that time. It also had a Talmud Torah, a cheder, and a yeshiva, as well as a "Bet Ya'akov" religious high school for girls.

Religious life was also celebrated in the camp's several synagogues and a mikvah. It had a sports club with 100 players, a movie theater, a 500-seat auditorium, and a theater group. The camp published the newspaper Undzer Hofenung (Our Hope).

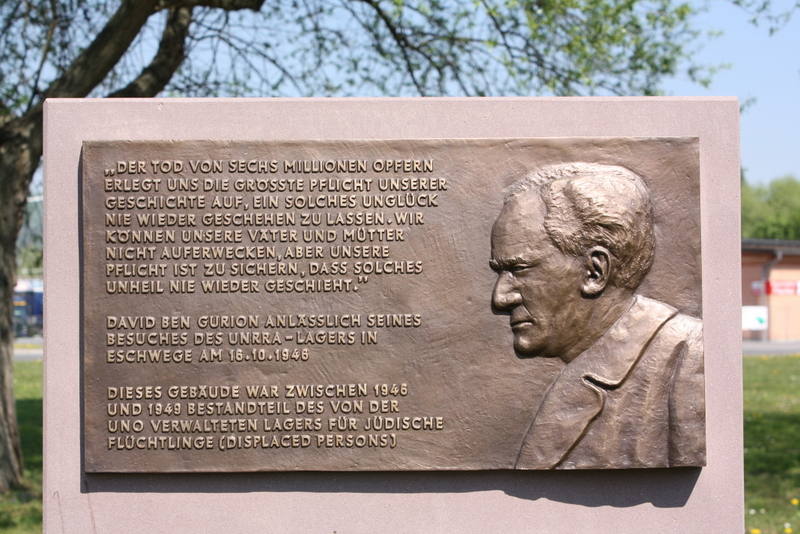
David Ben-Gurion-Memorial at the site of the former UNRRA-Camp in Eschwege

At its peak, on October 19, 1946, the camp housed roughly 3,355 Jews. It closed on April 26, 1949.

== Notes ==
This article incorporates text from the United States Holocaust Memorial Museum, and has been released under the GFDL.
