= Battle of Frankfurt =

Battle in WW2 (1945)

- Part of the Western Allied invasion of Germany, Advance to the Rhine in the Western Front of the European theatre of World War II
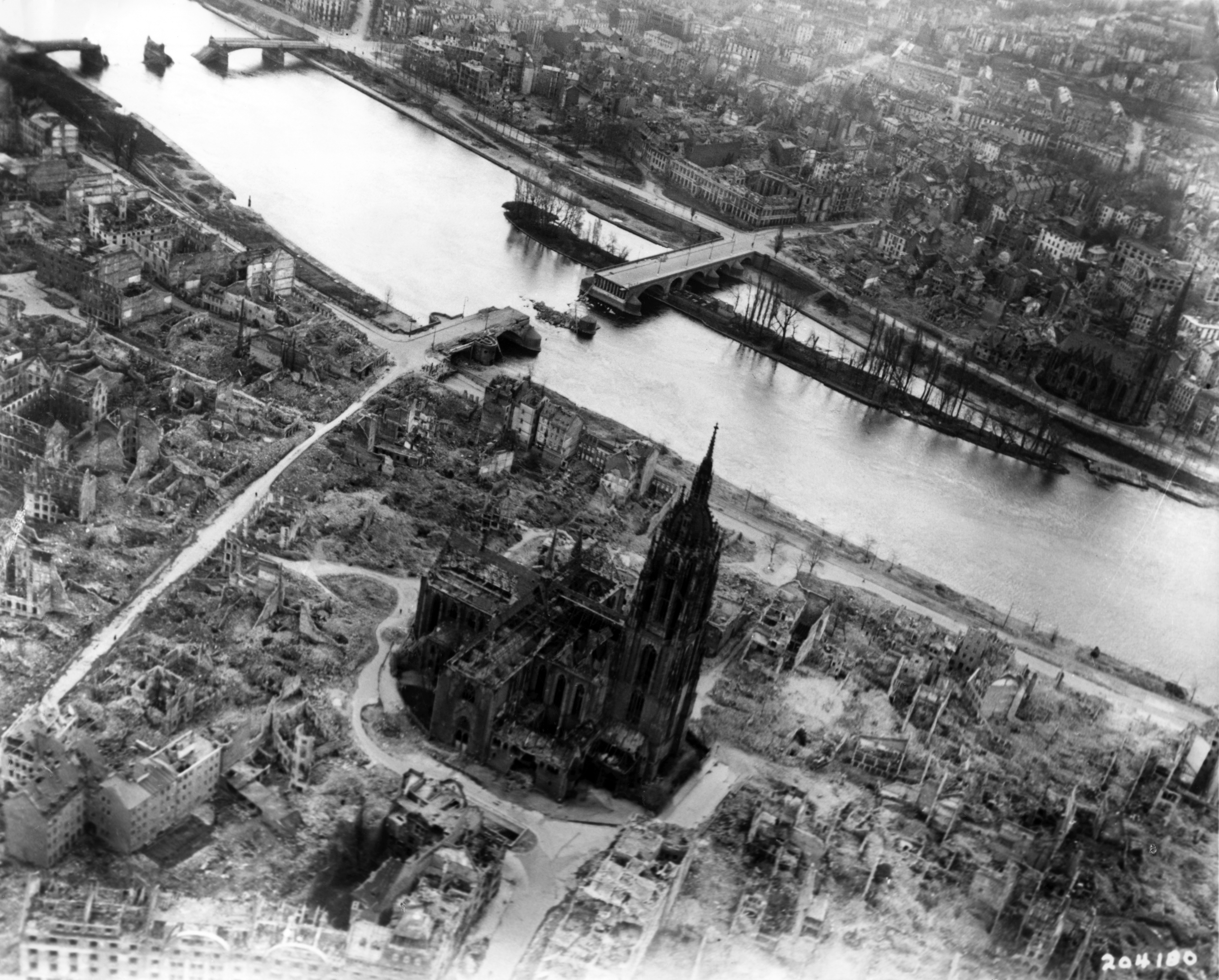
- An aerial view of Frankfurt after the war.
Date	26–29 March 1945
Location	Frankfurt, Germany
Result	American victory

Belligerents
United States	Germany

Commanders and leaders
(United States) Stafford LeRoy Irwin (United States) Robert W. Grow	(Nazi Germany) Albert Kesselring (Nazi Germany) Erich Löffler

Units involved
5th Infantry Division; 6th Armored Division	LXXX Corps

Strength
2 divisions	1-2 divisions (understrength)

Casualties and losses
unknown	24

The Battle of Frankfurt was a three-day battle for control of Frankfurt am Main during World War II. The 5th Infantry Division conducted the main attack while the 6th Armored Division provided support. The city was defended by the LXXX Corps of the Seventh Army.

== Prelude ==
The 5th Infantry Division crossed the Rhine on 22 March and quickly established a bridgehead. By 23 March, the 5th had expanded its bridgehead five miles east, putting the division only 14 miles southwest of Frankfurt. Armored Task Forces pushed from the bridgehead then to the North towards Trebur and Gustavsburg and to the East towards Darmstadt.

On 25 March, the Wehrmacht Commander of the Darmstadt garrison surrendered and Darmstadt was liberated by the 6th Armored and 5th Infantry Divisions. By 26 March, the 5th reached the southern outskirts of the city of Frankfurt and captured the Rhine-Main airbase.

== Battle ==
The 6th linked up with the 5th and pushed through the southern outskirts (Sachsenhausen) to the river Main. There, units of the 5th found the mostly intact Wilhelmsbruecke bridge (today known as the Friedensbruecke). German engineers had tried to blow it up in the attempt to stop the US Forces on 25 March but failed to do so. Supported by US tank artillery, the troops of the 5th crossed the Wilhelmsbruecke under heavy fire on 27 March and entered the northern part of the city. The two divisions then fought the Germans in fierce house-to-house combat, slowly pushing through the city to the north and to the east.

The city's Kampfkommandant, Oberstleutnant Erich Löffler, was killed on 27 March together with members of his staff when a 105 mm shell struck the command post in the Taunusanlage, crippling German military command in the city. On 29 March, the city was brought under American control and a pontoon bridge built by combat engineers on the eastern side of the damaged Wilhelmsbruecke. After initially attempting to set up defensive machine gun positions, German soldiers were convinced by citizens to leave the city and minimise additional casualties. The remaining Wehrmacht were pushed northwards and out of the city by US troops.

== Aftermath ==
AFN Luxembourg reported the city as liberated, however, small sporadic fighting continued until 4 April. Vogue war correspondent Lee Miller accompanied General Patton's Third Army and was among the first to report in the U.S. press on the liberation of Frankfurt. The Stars & Stripes reported the city as liberated on 30 March. After capturing Frankfurt, the 5th Division spent a few days resting until 7 April when it was ordered to move north to support the III Corps of the First Army in the Ruhr Pocket.

== See also ==
- Bombing of Frankfurt am Main in World War II
