= Peace Research Institute Frankfurt =

Research institute in Frankfurt, Germany

- Peace Research Institute Frankfurt – Leibniz-Institut für Friedens- und Konfliktforschung
- Abbreviation: PRIF
- Formation: 1970
- Founder: Hessian state government
- Type: government-funded think tank
- Legal status: Foundation (nonprofit)
- Purpose: Peace and conflict studies
- Location: Frankfurt am Main (Hesse, Germany)
- Coordinates: 50°05′44″N 8°41′25″E
- Official language: German and English predominantly
- Executive director: Nicole Deitelhoff
- Staff: ≈90
- Website: www.prif.org

The Peace Research Institute Frankfurt (acronym: PRIF, German: Peace Research Institute Frankfurt – Leibniz-Institut für Friedens- und Konfliktforschung) is a research institute in Frankfurt am Main focused on violent international and internal conflicts and research of conditions for and promotion of the concept of peace. With over 90 employees (as of 2019), PRIF is one of the largest peace research institutes in Germany.

The think tank for peace research and international relations was founded as an independent foundation under public law by the Hesse state government in 1970. PRIF conducts knowledge-oriented basic research, analyses the causes of violent international and internal conflicts, and also carries out research on the conditions necessary for peace.

One of PRIF's most essential tasks involves making the findings of the institute's basic research on the causes of conflicts and violence useful for the practice of promoting and securing peace. PRIF provides knowledge and recommendations to public institutions and policy makers.

The research institute's library is open to the public and has an extensive collection of specialised literature on peace and conflict research. The institute cooperates with higher education institutions and has especially close links to Goethe University Frankfurt and Technische Universität Darmstadt.

== Research departments ==
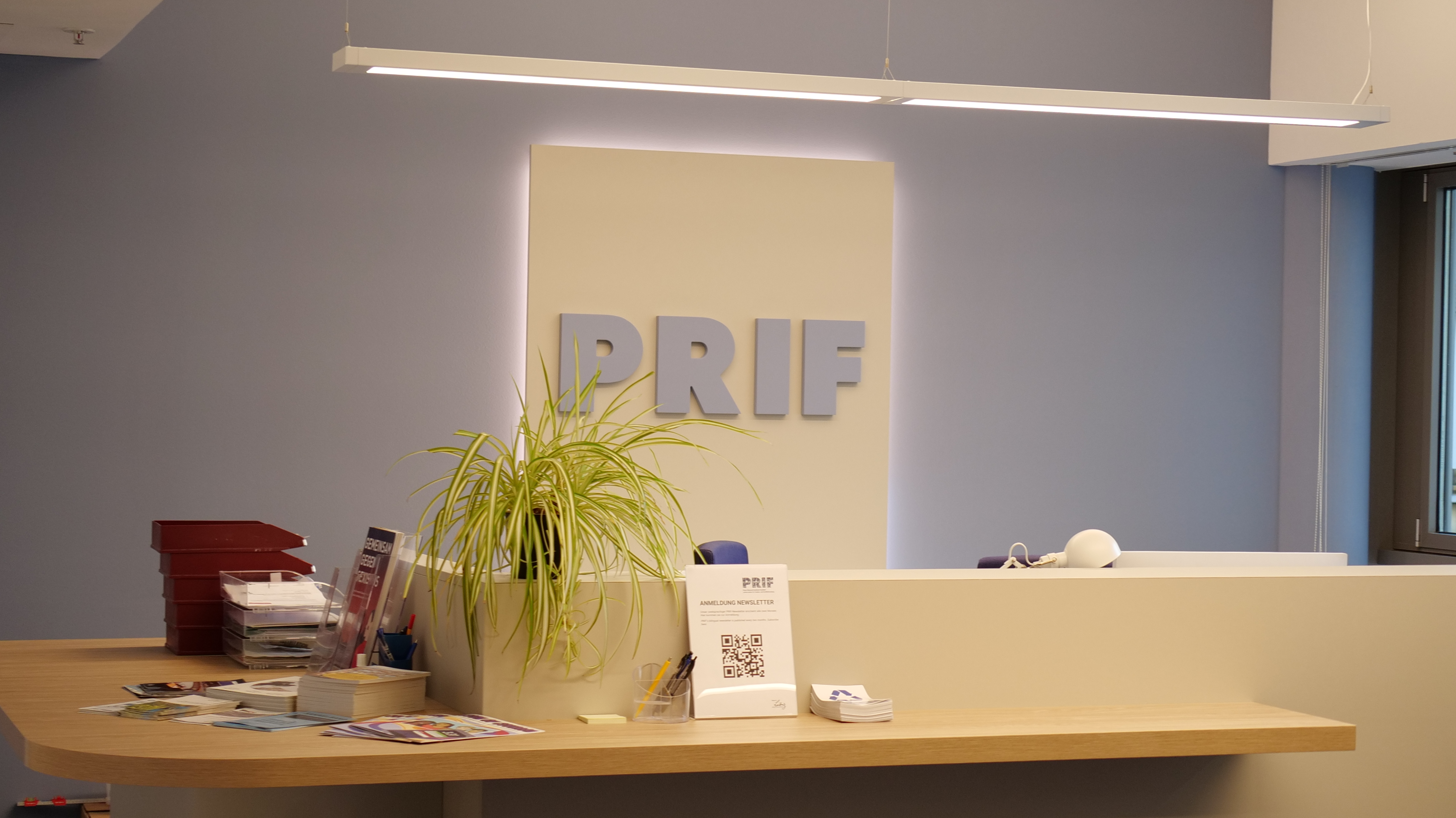
PRIF Reception Area

Central research topics and perspectives include:

- Arms control, disarmament and non-proliferation
- International organizations, international law and normative orders
- Non-state violent actors, transnational corporations, civil society
- Radicalization and political violence
- Intrastate conflicts, organization and transformation of political rule
- Globalization and local life-worlds

Research at PRIF is mainly structured by its research programmes. With its programme-bound research, PRIF combines basic research that involves scholars from throughout the institute with applied research and its practical implementation. Since 2018, the Institute's "Peace and Coercion" research programme has focused on the ambivalent relationship between coercion and the establishment and maintenance of peace.

== Organization ==
The Executive Director of the PRIF is Nicole Deitelhoff. Other members of the Executive Board are Christopher Daase, Susanne Boetsch, Stefan Kroll, Tobias Ide, Sabine Mannitz, Irene Weipert-Fenner, Simone Wisotzki and Jonas Wolff.

The Research Council is a body that includes all PRIF scholars. It makes decisions on the overall research programme and on projects of individual research departments.

The Board of Trustees, consisting of Hesse's Prime Minister, the Minister for Science and the Arts, and the Finance Minister of Hesse, three other public figures and three elected representatives from within the institute, supervises the management of the institute and approves its budget.

The Advisory Board supports the PRIF on the design and implementation of the institute's research programs. Four-year terms are by appointment of the Board of Trustees, which is made up of eight scholars from Germany and abroad.

In 2009 PRIF became a member institute of the Leibniz Association.

== Publications ==
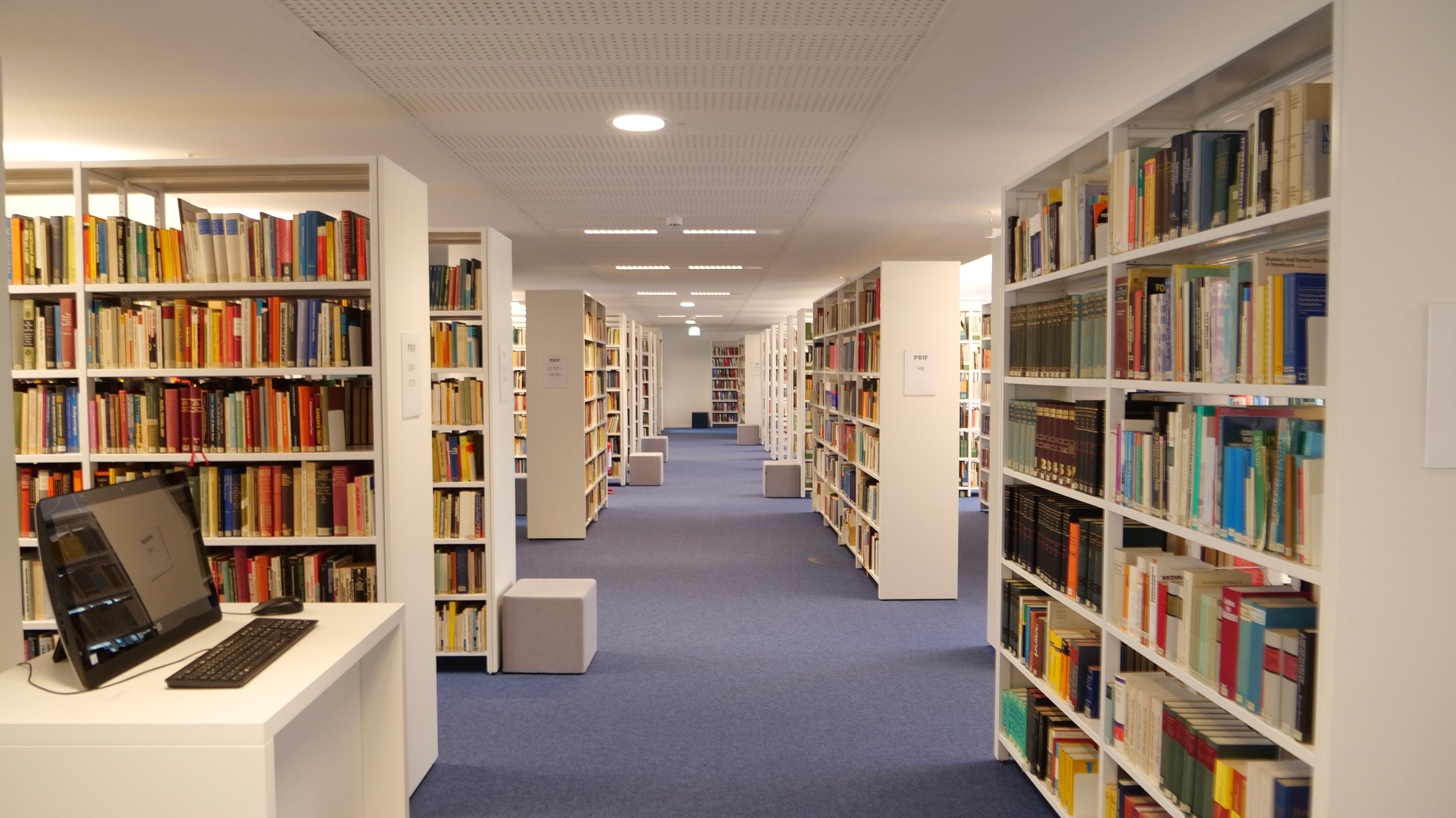
PRIF Library

PRIF publishes monographs and anthologies in cooperation with Springer Verlag in the series Studien der Hessischen Stiftung Friedens- und Konfliktforschung. Subject to an external review process, the series features basic research findings from the Institute, contributions to the peace and security discourse, and working papers and publications prepared for PRIF's scholarly conferences. In addition, about 10 PRIF Reports are published annually, analysing the background and developments of political events. The four-page PRIF Spotlights are intended for a broader general readership interested in peace and security issues. The PRIF Working Papers are published online on an ad hoc basis and are intended to provide insight into current basic research and stimulate scholarly exchange. The publications are available for download online and print versions are available at numerous libraries.

Since 2018, the publications have been supplemented online by the PRIF Blog, on which PRIF researchers discuss short texts on current issues and debates relevant to peace and conflict research.

In addition to its own series, PRIF publishes the Peace Report annually together with the Bonn International Centre for Conversion (BICC), the Institute for Peace Research and Security Policy (IFSH) and the Institute for Development and Peace (INEF). The reports have also been available for download online since 2018.

== Other ==
=== Prizes and awards ===
In honour of its long-standing director Ernst-Otto Czempiel, the Institute awards the Ernst-Otto Czempiel Prize every two to three years to the best postdoctoral monograph in international peace research. The prize is endowed with 5,000 euros and has been awarded at the PRIF annual conference since 2008.

The Hessian Peace Prize was established on 16 October 1993 by Albert Osswald, former Prime Minister of Hesse, and the Albert Osswald Foundation, which he founded. The award is presented to people who have rendered outstanding services to international understanding and peace. Each year, a winner selected by the Hessian Peace Prize Board of Trustees receives the award, which is endowed with 25,000 euros. PRIF advises the Board of Trustees on the selection and documents the award ceremony.

The #PRIF@School_Award was announced for the first time for the 2021/22 school year and is aimed at pupils in grades 9 to 13 from all types of schools in Hesse. With the competition, PRIF aims to strengthen political education on peace and conflict research topics at schools in Hesse. The main prize is endowed with 200 euros and is awarded every two years.

=== 2023 Rebranding ===
As part of a rebranding, the institute changed its German name in 2023 from Leibniz-Institut Hessische Stiftung Friedens- und Konfliktforschung (HSFK) to Peace Research Institute Frankfurt – Leibniz-Institut für Friedens- und Konfliktforschung (PRIF).
