= History of Frankfurt =

Coat of arms of Frankfurt

Timeline of Frankfurt am Main
historical affiliations

Francia, 794–843
East Francia, 843–962
Holy Roman Empire, 962–1806
Free City of Frankfurt, 1372–1806
Grand Duchy of Frankfurt, 1806–1813
Free City of Frankfurt, 1813–1866
Kingdom of Prussia, 1866–1918
German Empire, 1871–1918
Weimar Republic, 1918–1933
German Reich, 1933–1945
American occupation zone, 1945–1949
West Germany, 1949–1990
Germany, 1990–present

The city of Frankfurt developed from an early settlement on the Main into one of the most important political and commercial centres of Germany. Its location at the intersection of major trade routes contributed to its importance from the Early Middle Ages. Frankfurt was first mentioned in written sources in the late 8th century. In the following centuries, it acquired an increasingly important role within the Holy Roman Empire.

From 1147 onward, Frankfurt was the site of most elections of the German kings, a role formally confirmed by the Golden Bull of 1356. Beginning in 1562, most Holy Roman emperors were also crowned in Frankfurt Cathedral. Alongside its political importance, Frankfurt became a major centre of long-distance trade. The Frankfurt Trade Fair developed into one of the most significant fairs in Europe, while the city's status as a free imperial city gave it substantial political and economic autonomy.

Frankfurt lost its independence with the dissolution of the Holy Roman Empire in 1806 and became part of the Napoleonic Grand Duchy of Frankfurt. In 1815 it regained the status of a sovereign city as the Free City of Frankfurt and became the seat of the German Confederation's Federal Convention. During the German revolutions of 1848–1849, the Frankfurt Parliament convened in St. Paul's Church in an attempt to establish a unified constitutional German state. After the Austro-Prussian War of 1866, the city was annexed by the Kingdom of Prussia. Industrialisation and rapid population growth subsequently transformed Frankfurt into a major city of the German Empire.

During the Second World War, large parts of the historic city centre were destroyed by Allied air raids. After the war, Frankfurt became part of the state of Hesse in West Germany. It was considered as a possible seat of government for the newly established Federal Republic of Germany, but Bonn was ultimately chosen instead. In the post-war period, Frankfurt developed into Germany's leading financial centre and an important centre of transport and international commerce.

== Early history ==
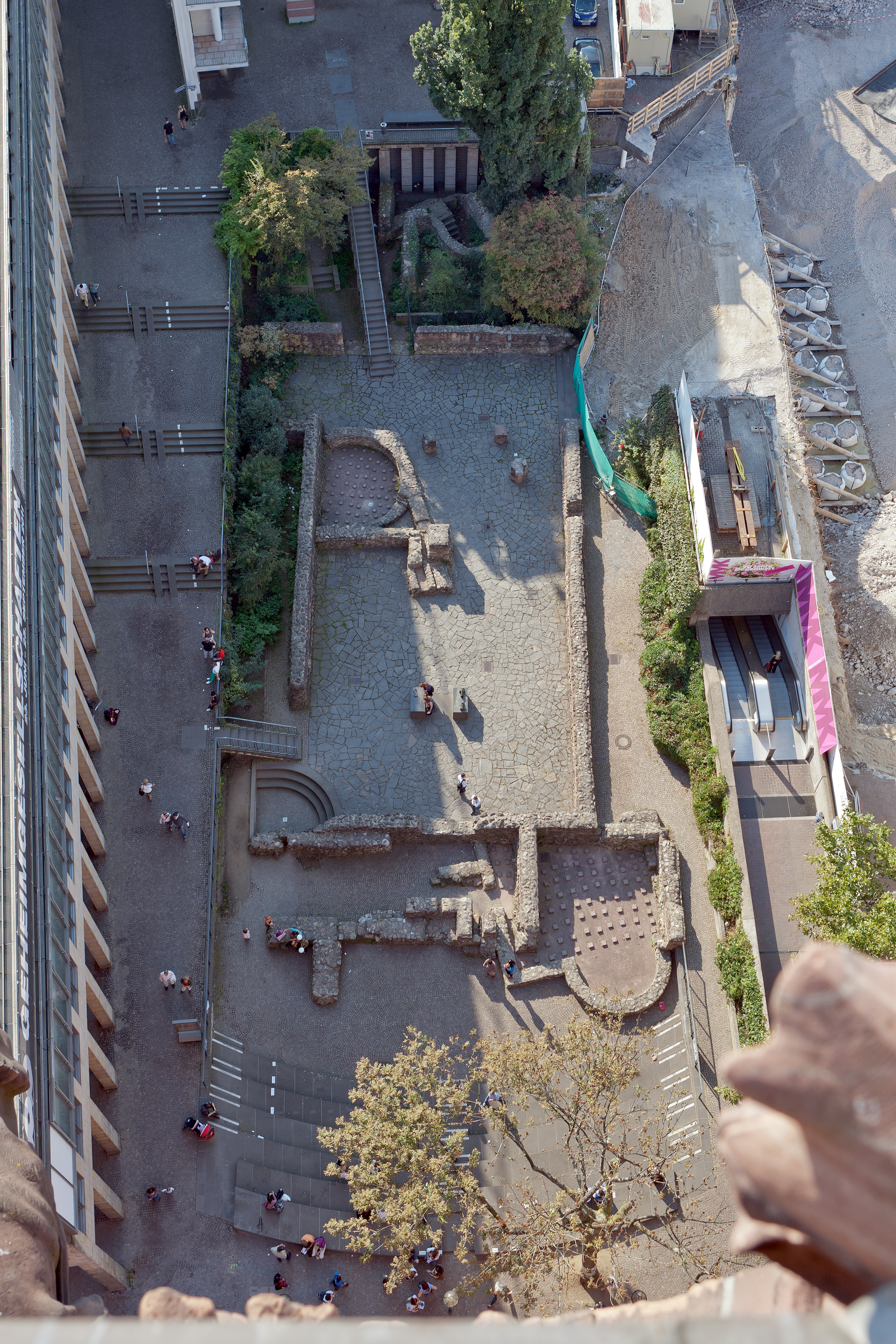
View from the tower of Frankfurt Cathedral over the remains of Roman and early medieval foundations on Cathedral Hill (2011)

Frankfurt is located in what was originally a swampy portion of the Main valley, a lowland criss-crossed by channels of the river. The oldest parts are therefore to be found on the higher portions of the valley, through which passed the Roman road from Mainz (Roman Moguntiacum) to Heddernheim (Roman Nida). The Odenwald and Spessart ranges surrounded the area, lending a defensive advantage, and placenames show that the lowlands on both sides of the river were originally wooded.

The oldest part of the Altstadt, the old city center, is the Cathedral Hill (Domhügel), upon an island created by arms of the Main. Only from the West could it be reached by foot without getting wet; this, together with its location at a ford, gave it significant military and economic advantages.

Stray archeological finds on the Domhügel go back to the Paleolithic, but the first proven settlement and land development date to the Roman era. It is assumed that the Romans settled on the hill in the last quarter of the 1st century CE; amongst other things, a Roman bath has been found, which may have belonged to a larger complex, possibly a fortress. Apparently the military occupation was abandoned during the 2nd century and replaced by a villa. Several farm buildings have also been excavated. A similar building complex was discovered at the modern Günthersburgpark in the Frankfurt-Bornheim portion of the city.

With the retreat of the Roman border to the west bank of the Rhine in 259/260, the Roman history of Frankfurt came to an end.

=== Early Middle Ages ===
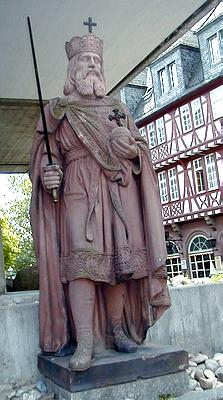
A 19th century statue of Charlemagne in Frankfurt

The name Frankfurt first appears in writing in the year 793, but it seems to have already been a considerable city. In 794 a letter from the Emperor to the bishop of Toledo contained "in loco celebri, qui dicitur Franconofurd", which reads "that famous place, which is called Frankfurt."

It seems Cathedral Hill was already permanently settled in Merovingian times (possibly first by Romans). In 1992 excavations at the cathedral found the rich grave of a girl, that has been dated to the late Merovingian period of the 7th century.

Charlemagne built himself a royal court at "Franconovurd", the "ford of the Franks", and in the summer of 794 held a church council there, convened by the grace of God, authority of the pope, and command of Charlemagne (canon 1), and attended by the bishops of the Frankish kingdom, Italy and the province of Aquitania, and even by ecclesiastics from England. The council was summoned primarily for the condemnation of Adoptionism. According to the testimony of contemporaries two papal legates were present, Theophylact and Stephen, representing Pope Adrian I. After an allocution by Charlemagne, the bishops drew up two memorials against the Adoptionists, one containing arguments from patristic writings; the other arguments from Scripture. The first was the Libellus sacrosyllabus, written by Paulinus, Patriarch of Aquileia, in the name of the Italian bishops; the second was the Epistola Synodica, addressed to the bishops of Spain by those of the Empire, Gaul and Aquitania. In the first of its fifty-six canons the council condemned Adoptionism, and in the second repudiated the Second Council of Nicaea of 787, which, according to the faulty Latin translation of its Acts (see Caroline Books), seemed to decree that the same kind of worship should be paid to images as to the Blessed Trinity, though the Greek text clearly distinguishes between latreia and proskynesis; this constituted a condemnation of iconoclasm. The remaining fifty-four canons dealt with metropolitan jurisdiction, monastic discipline, superstition etc.

Louis the Pious, Charlemagne's son, selected Frankfurt as his seat, extended the palatinate, built a larger palace, and in 838 had the city encircled by defensive walls and ditches.

After the Treaty of Verdun (843), Frankfurt became to all intents and purposes the capital of East Francia and was named Principalis sedes regni orientalis (principal seat of the eastern realm). Kings and emperors frequently stayed in Frankfurt, and Imperial Diets and church councils were repeatedly held there. The establishment of religious monasteries and numerous endowments to the local church furthered the urban community. Also, as the Holy Roman Emperor had no permanent residence anymore, Frankfurt remained the center of imperial power and the principal city of Eastern Francia.

== Late Middle Ages ==
Frankfurt in the Middle Ages (in German; English subtitles available)

After the era of lesser importance under the Salian and Saxon emperors, a single event once again brought Frankfurt to the fore: it was in the local church in 1147 that Bernard of Clairvaux called, amongst others, the Hohenstaufen king Conrad III to the Second Crusade. Before leaving for Jerusalem, Conrad selected his ten-year-old son as heir, but the boy died before his father. Due to this, an election was held in Frankfurt five years later, and after the emperor Frederick Barbarossa was elected, Frankfurt became the customary place for the election of the German kings.

=== Free Imperial City of Frankfurt ===
By 1180 the city had expanded greatly, and by 1250 had seen an increase in privileges in addition to economic growth. A free imperial city under the Hohenstaufen emperors, Frankfurt experienced strong growth and rising national importance. Responsibility for the maintenance of public order lay with the bailiffs and reeves; however, the citizens selected their own mayors and officials, who were responsible for some judicial duties. These officials enjoyed the favor of the emperors, who had eliminated the reeves entirely by the end of the Hohenstaufen dynasty. Soon, Frankfurt became a fully self-governing Imperial estate with seat and vote on the Rhineland bench of the College of towns of the Imperial Diet. On the Reichsmatrikel (Imperial tax-schedule) of 1521, Frankfurt's contribution to the defense of the Empire was assessed at 500 gulden, 140 foot soldiers and 20 horsemen, ranking fifth among the 85 free imperial cities, behind Nuremberg, Ulm, Strasburg and Lübeck.

== Early modern period ==
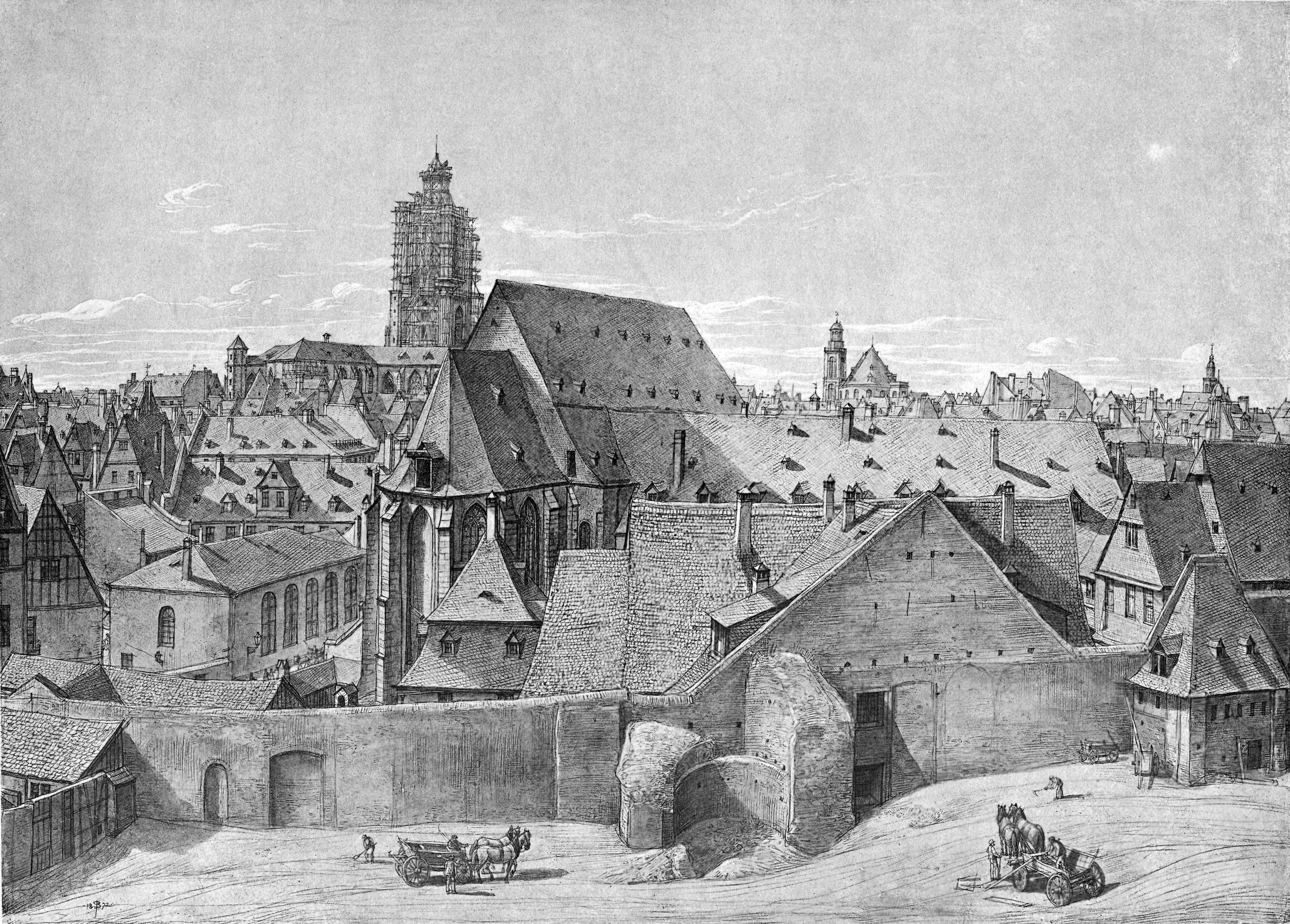
Frankfurt preserved its essentially medieval aspect as late as 1872.

Starting from the 16th century, trade and the arts flowered in Frankfurt. Science and innovation progressed, and the invention of the printing press in nearby Mainz promoted education and knowledge. From the 15th to 17th centuries, the most important book fair in Germany was held in Frankfurt, a custom which would be revived in 1949.

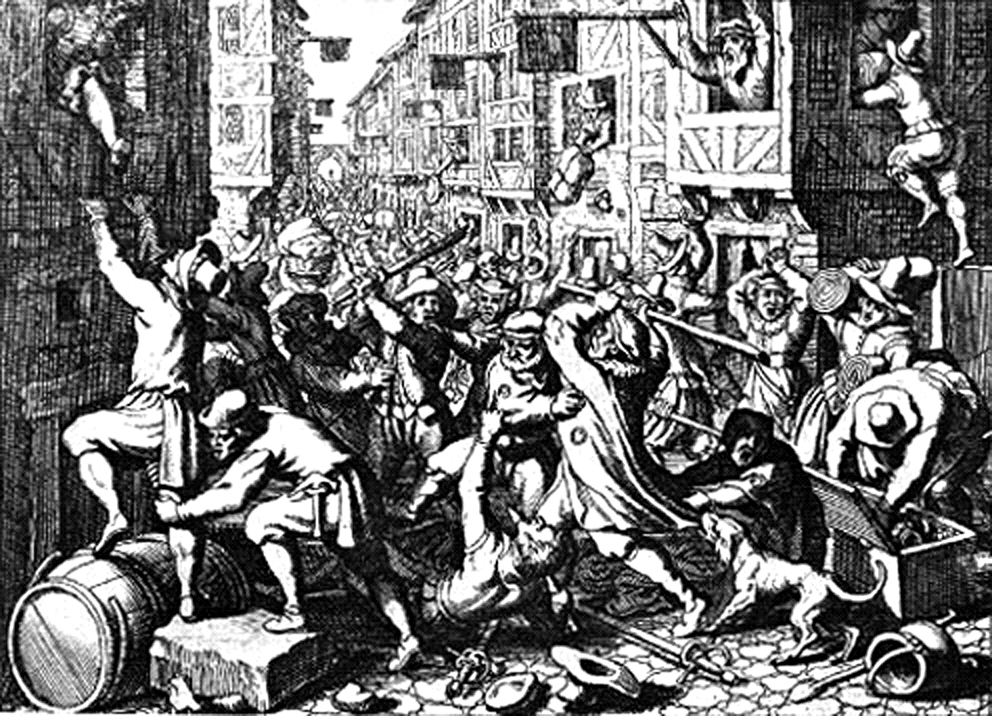
Plundering of the Jewish quarter during the Fettmilch uprising

In the early 17th century tensions between the guilds and the patricians, who dominated the city council, led to substantial unrest. The guilds asked for greater participation in urban and fiscal policies as well as for economic restrictions of the Jewish community's rights. In 1612, following the election of Emperor Matthias, the council rejected the Guild's request, to read out publicly the imperial privileges given to the city. This caused the Fettmilch uprising, named after its leader, the baker Vincenz Fettmilch. A part of the populace, mainly craftsmen, rose up against the city council. In 1614, the mob began a pogrom in the city's Jewish ghetto, and the emperor had to ask Mainz and Hessen-Darmstadt to restore order.

In the Thirty Years' War, Frankfurt was able to maintain its neutrality; the city council had avoided siding with one opponent or another after its negative experiences in the Schmalkaldic War. This issue became critical between 1631 and 1635, when the Swedish regent Gustav Adolf came to Frankfurt demanding accommodation and provisions for himself and his troops. But the city mastered these adversities more easily than what was to follow the war: the plague ravaged the city, as it would most of Europe at this time. In the 1648 Peace of Westphalia, Frankfurt was confirmed as an Imperial Free City, and soon reached new heights of prosperity. The Palais Barckhaus at Zeil in Frankfurt even served as residence of Emperor Charles VII until 1744.

== From the French Revolution to the end of the Free State ==
Frankfurt in 1770, protected by its walls and bastions

During the French Revolutionary War, General Custine occupied Frankfurt in October 1792. On December 2 of the same year, the city was retaken.

In January 1806, General Augereau occupied the city with 9,000 men and extorted 4 million francs from it. Frankfurt's status as a free city ended when it was granted to Karl Theodor Anton Maria von Dalberg in the same year. In 1810 Dalberg's territories were reorganized into the Grand Duchy of Frankfurt.

During this time, the city experienced serious changes in the structure and construction of the town. Centuries-old defensive walls were dismantled, replaced by garden plots. It was felt that one no longer need fear cannon fire, even without walls. On July 1, 1808, Goethe's mother wrote to her son Wolfgang: "Die alten Wälle sind abgetragen, die alten Tore eingerissen, um die ganze Stadt ein Park." (The old barriers are levelled, the old gates torn down, around the whole city a park.)

On November 2, 1813, the allies drew together in Frankfurt, to re-establish its old rights and set up a central administrative council under Baron vom Stein. The Congress of Vienna clarified that Frankfurt was a Free City of the German federation, and in 1816 it became the seat of the Bundestag. This government seat occupied the Palais Thurn und Taxis. When Goethe visited his native city for the last time in 1815, he encouraged the councilmen with the words: "A free spirit befits a free city…..It befits Frankfurt to shine in all directions and to be active in all directions."

The city took good heed of this advice. When in 1831 Arthur Schopenhauer, a lecturer at the time, moved from Berlin to Frankfurt, he justified it with the lines: "Healthy climate, beautiful surroundings, the amenities of large cities, the Natural History Museum, better theater, opera, and concerts, more Englishman, better coffee houses, no bad water… and a better dentist."

In 1833 a revolutionary movement attempted to topple the Diet of the royalist German Confederation, which sat at Frankfurt, and was quickly put down.

=== The Revolutions of 1848 and their aftermath ===
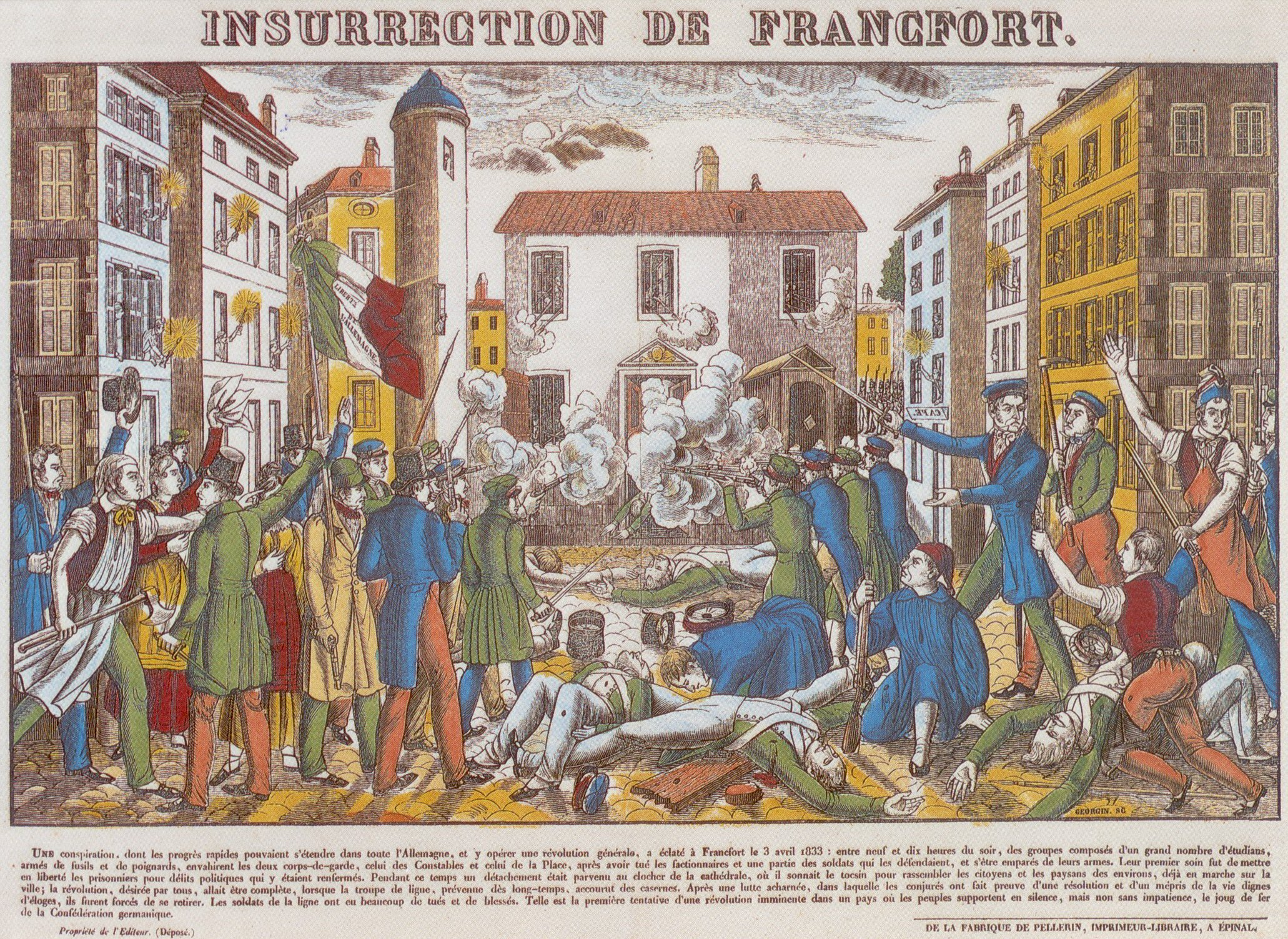
Rebellion of the German Revolutionary Student Movement, 1833

The Revolutions of 1848, also known as the March Revolution, forced Klemens von Metternich, the reactionary Austrian head of state, to step down. This was celebrated wildly in Frankfurt. On 30 March 1848 one could see black, red, and gold flags everywhere, and the populace was admonished not to shoot into the air.

On 18 May 1848, the National Assembly held its first meeting in the Frankfurter Paulskirche. The last meeting was held there a year later, on 31 May 1849. Frankfurt was at this point the center of all political life in Germany. The party transformation and the excitement were the most violent there; riots, particularly among those living in the Sachsenhausen quarter, had to be suppressed with force of arms on 7–8 July 1848 as well as on 18 September.

The next fifteen years saw new industrial laws focusing on complete freedom of trade, and political Emancipation of the Jews, initiated ten years before its final realization in 1864.

Starting in August 1863, a political gathering focused on German federal reform met in Frankfurt, including the national congress and the opposing reform congress. The Kingdom of Prussia did not show up, however, and the reform failed, leading to the Austro-Prussian War in 1866. Frankfurt was annexed by Prussia as a result of the war, and the city was made part of the province of Hesse-Nassau.

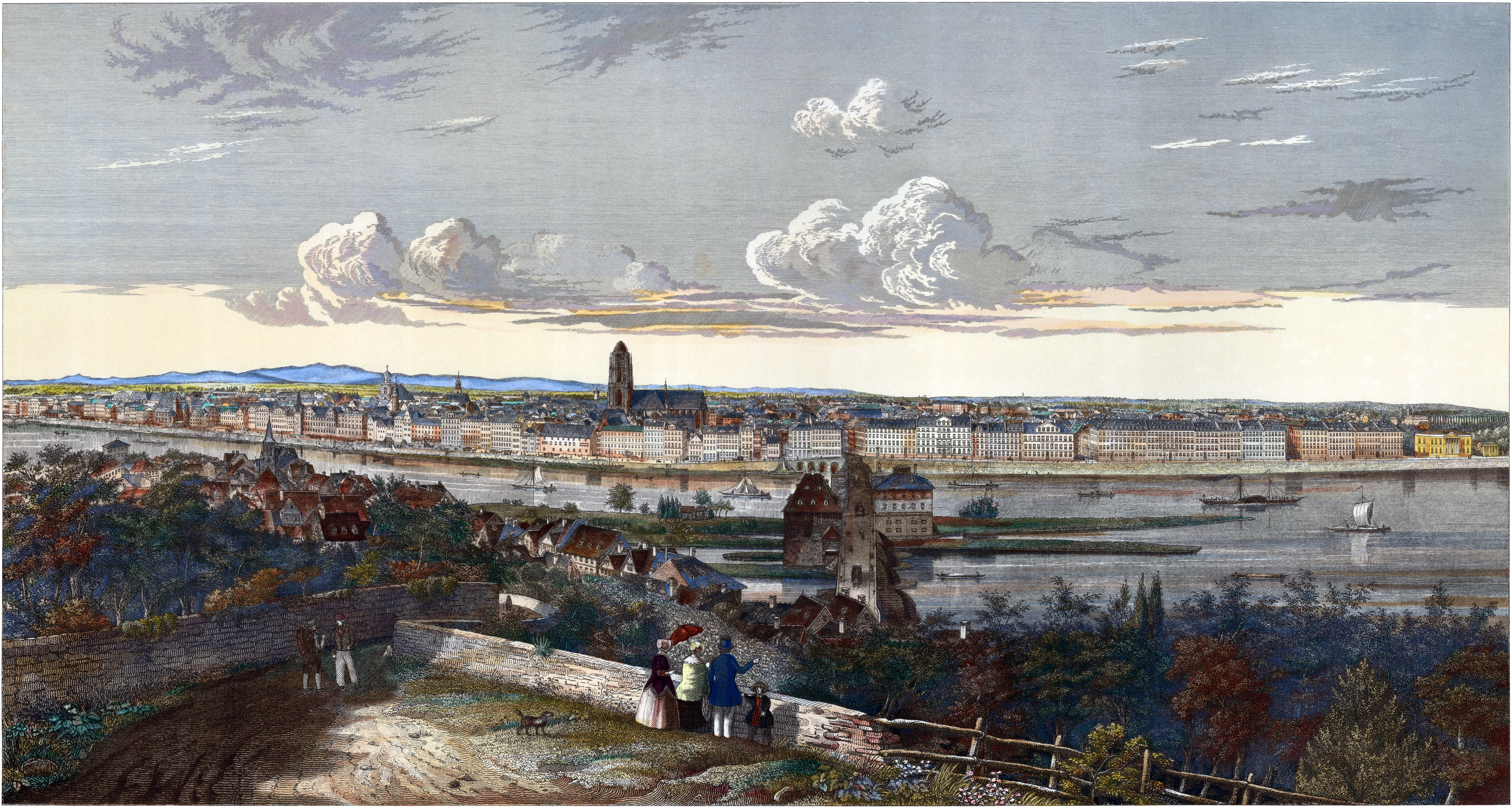
c. 1845 steel engraving: View from Sachsenhäuser Berg to the north, in the foreground staffage people clothed in late Biedermeier style, behind them to the left Sachsenhausen, in the middleground the Main with the Alte Brücke, the neo-classical Main front from the Schöne Aussicht with the Alte Stadtbibliothek in the east to the Mainkai with the Saalhof to the Untermainkai with the Leonhardskirche and the Untermaintor in the west, behind it the city with the looming cathedral and the spires of the Liebfrauenkirche, the Katharinenkirche, the Alte Nikolaikirche and the Paulskirche, in the background the Taunus

== Recent history ==
=== Early Nazi period ===
In 1933 the Jewish mayor (Oberbürgermeister) Ludwig Landmann was replaced by NSDAP member Friedrich Krebs. This led to the firing of all Jewish officials in the city administration and from city organizations. A meeting of Frankfurt traders, who wanted to discuss the boycott of Jewish businesses, was broken up and the participants arrested and intimidated. Although the Nazis had originally mocked the city as the Jerusalem am Main because of its high Jewish population, the city adopted a propagandistic nickname, the Stadt des deutschen Handwerks or the city of German craft.

=== Kristallnacht ===
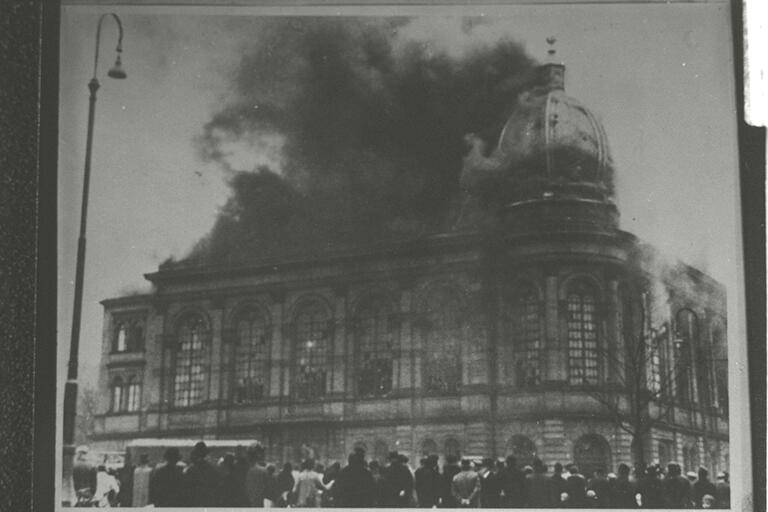
The main synagogue in Frankfurt destroyed on Kristallnacht

Most of the synagogues in Frankfurt were destroyed by the Nazis on Kristallnacht in late 1938, deportation of the Jewish residents to their deaths in the Nazi concentration camps quickening in pace after the event. Their property and valuables were stolen by the Gestapo before deportation, and most were subjected to extreme violence and sadism during transport to the train stations for the cattle wagons which carried them east. Most later deportees (after the war began in 1939) ended up in new ghettoes established by the Nazis such as the Warsaw Ghetto and the Łódź Ghetto, before their final transportation and murder in camps such as Sobibor, Belzec and Treblinka.

=== World War II ===
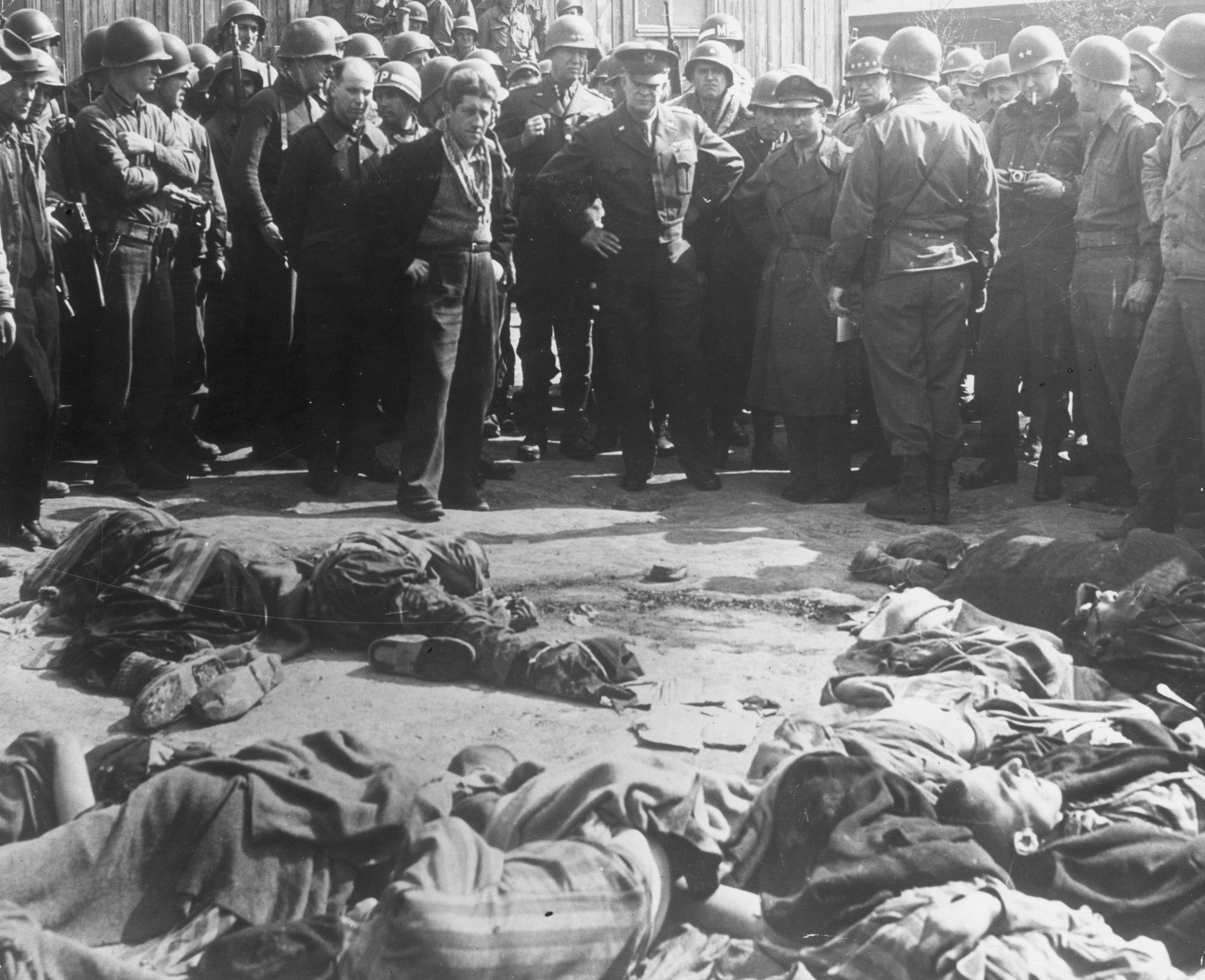
Commander-in-Chief of all Allied Forces, General Dwight D. Eisenhower, witnesses the corpses found at Ohrdruf forced labor camp in May 1945.

During World War II, Frankfurt was the location of a Nazi prison for underage girls with several forced labour camps, a camp for Sinti and Romani people (see Romani Holocaust), the Dulag Luft West transit camp for Allied prisoners of war, and a subcamp of the Natzweiler-Struthof concentration camp.

Large parts of the city center were destroyed by in the bombings of the second World War. On March 22, 1944, a British attack destroyed the entire Old City, killing 1001 people. The East Port - an important shipping center for bulk goods, with its own rail connection - was also largely destroyed.

Frankfurt was first reached by the Allied ground advance into Germany during late March 1945. The US 5th Infantry Division seized the Rhine-Main airport on 26 March 1945 and crossed assault forces over the river into the city on the following day. The tanks of the supporting US 6th Armored Division at the Main River bridgehead came under concentrated fire from dug-in heavy flak guns at Frankfurt. The urban battle consisted of slow clearing operations on a block-by-block basis until 29 March 1945, when Frankfurt was declared as secured, although some sporadic fighting continued until 4 April 1945.

=== Post-war period ===
See also Post-war reconstruction of Frankfurt

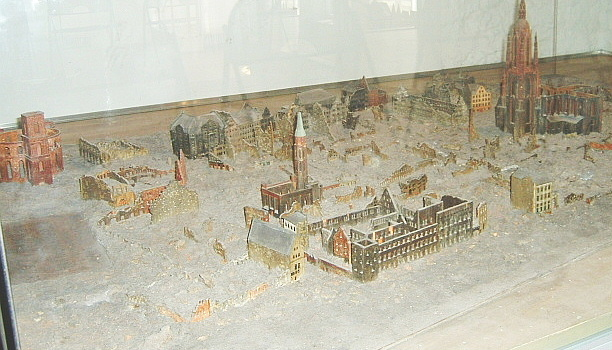
Model of Frankfurt's old city center after the bombing raids

The Military Governor for the United States Zone (1945–1949) and the United States High Commissioner for Germany (HICOG) (1949–1952) had their headquarters in the IG Farben Building, intentionally left undamaged by the Allies' wartime bombardment.

The heavily destroyed city decided in the spirit of the time to plan a major reconstruction of the historical city center, retaining the old road system. To remove and recycle the rubble the city authorities in the autumn of 1945 created in partnership with the Metallgesellschaft industrial group and the Philipp Holzmann and Wayss & Freytag construction companies the Trümmerverwertungsgesellschaft. This non-profit company was tasked with removing the rubble and recycling it. Initially the removed rubble was piled up on a Schuttberg (rubble mountain) called Monte Scherbelino, before the material was recycled and processed to such an extent that by 1964 the Schuttberg had completely disappeared.

Once the rubble was removed from the damaged areas post-war reconstruction of the city took place in a sometimes simple modern style, thus changing Frankfurt's architectural face. A few significant historical landmark buildings were reconstructed, albeit in a simplified manner (e.g. St. Paul's Church (which was the first rebuilt), Goethe House) and Römer.

The formerly independent city republic joined the state of Hesse in 1946. As the state capital was already at the smaller city of Wiesbaden and the American armed forces had used Frankfurt as their European headquarters, the city seemed most promising candidate for the West German federal capital. The American forces even agreed to withdraw from Frankfurt to make it suitable, as the British forces already had withdrawn from Bonn. Much to the disappointment of many in Frankfurt, however, the vote narrowly favored Bonn twice. Despite this, the mayor looked towards the future, seeing that with the division of Germany and relative isolation of Berlin, Frankfurt could take over positions in trade and commerce previously filled by Berlin and Leipzig. Since Bonn never played an important role despite its status as capital, Frankfurt, Hamburg, and Munich realigned themselves, passing from regional centers to international metropolises and effectively forming three West German cultural and financial capitals.

Since the turn of the 2nd century, the Frankfurt fair has been held every fall and had become the most important fair site in Europe. Frankfurt's countless publishing houses as well as its fur industry profited from the elimination of Leipzig by the division of Germany into East and West. After the war, the West German book fair was held in Frankfurt. Since German reunification, the Frankfurt Book Fair is held in the fall, and Leipzig's in the spring. The bi-annual Internationale Automobil-Ausstellung is a worldwide car fair that was also held in Frankfurt until 2019.

The Deutsche Bundesbank made Frankfurt its seat, and most major banks followed suit. This and the Frankfurt Stock Exchange have made the city the second most important commercial center in Europe, after London.

== Jewish Frankfurt am Main ==
See also Frankfurter Judengasse, Jewish Museum Frankfurt, People born and active in Frankfurt, History of the Jews in Germany, List of German Jews

The date of the original organization of Frankfurt's Jewish community is uncertain. Probably no Jews were living in Frankfurt at the time of the first and second Crusades, as the city is not mentioned among the places where Jews were persecuted, although references occur to persecutions in the neighboring cities of Mainz and Worms.

A Jew of Frankfurt is mentioned in connection with the sale of a house at Cologne between 1175 and 1191. Eliezer ben Nathan, rabbi at Mainz toward the end of the twelfth century, says that there were not then ten adult Jews in Frankfurt. The first reliable information concerning Frankfurt Jews dates from 1241, on May 24 of which year 180 Hebrews were killed during a riot and many fled, this being the first Judenschlacht or slaughter of the Jews. As the affair was detrimental to the income of the emperor, he was incensed with the city for seven years. King Conrad IV did not forgive the citizens until May 6, 1246. The emperor distributed the income he derived from the Jews so liberally among the princes and his retainers that he had little left for himself; yet the Jews remained under his protection. In 1286 King Rudolf pledged to Count Adolf of Nassau 20 marks yearly from the income derived from the Frankfurt Jews. When Adolf was made king under the title of "Adolf of Nassau", he pledged these 20 marks to the knight Gottfried of Merenberg (1292); and the latter again pledged 4 marks of this sum to the knight Heinrich of Sachsenhausen. King Adolf also gave 25 marks to Glottfried of Eppstein as a hereditary fief; and from 1297 he gave 300 marks yearly of the Jews' tax to the Archbishop of Mainz, adding to this sum 500 pounds of hellers in 1299. As early as 1303 the archbishop pledged 100 marks of this amount, and thus the Jews of the city of Frankfurt became subject to the archbishop. The emperor, however, attempted to exact still more money from the Jews, and it was only thanks to the resistance of the city that King Adolf did not succeed in 1292 in extracting from them the sum required for his coronation.

The Jews were subject not only to the emperor and to the archbishop but also to the city; in 1331 King Ludwig recommended his "beloved Kammerknechte" to the protection of the municipality. Under Ludwig the Frankfurt Jews were accused of a crime and cruelly persecuted, and many fled. The king then confiscated the houses and other property of the fugitives and sold them to the municipal council for 3,000 pounds of hellers. Those Jews that returned had their property restored to them; and, as the Jews had been treated unjustly, the king promised not to punish them again but to be content with the verdict of the municipal council. The Jews were required, however, to pay to the king a new impost, the "goldene Opferpfennig."

=== 14th century ===
During the Black Death (1349) the Jews of Frankfurt were again persecuted. At the beginning of these outbreaks the circumspect Emperor Charles IV, who feared for his income, pledged the Jews to the city for more than 15,000 pounds of hellers, stipulating that he would redeem them, which he never did. The Flagellants, on coming to Frankfurt, destroyed nearly the entire Jewish community, with the Jews in their distress setting fire to their own houses. Their property was confiscated by the council by way of indemnity. Jews returned to Frankfurt very gradually. In 1354 Charles IV renewed his pledge to the city; three years later the Archbishop of Mainz again advanced his claims, but the Jews and the council came to an agreement with him in 1358. In 1367 the city was again in full possession of the income derived from the Jews, but this did not prevent the emperor from occasionally levying extraordinary taxes; for example, Sigismund (1414) exacted a contribution from the Jews toward the expenses of the Council of Constance.

The Jews were under the jurisdiction of the municipal council. Beginning with 1488, privileges (Judenstüttigkeiten) were issued that had to be renewed every three years. The Jews lived originally in the vicinity of the cathedral, this part of the city being necessary for their commerce; but Christians also lived there. Hence it was a hard blow to the former when they were forced, in 1462, to settle outside the old city ramparts and the moat. At first the city built their dwellings, but later they were required to erect their own houses, The Judengasse originally consisted merely of one row of houses; when this became overcrowded, a part of the moat was filled in, and houses were built upon the new ground thus obtained. There were three gates in the street, one at each end and one in the center. The cemetery of the community, which was situated on the Fischerfeld and is still in existence, is mentioned for the first time in 1300, but a tombstone dated July, 1272, has been preserved. Among the communal buildings were the synagogue (called also the "Judenschule"), the "Judenbadstube", the "Juden-Tanzhaus" or "Spielhaus", and the hospital. The Jewish inhabitants were more numerous in the early years of the community than later on: in 1241 they numbered about 200; in 1357 there were 12 tax-paying families; from 1357 to 1379, not more than 14 on the average; from 1401 to 1450, an average of 12; while in 1473 there were 17 families.

=== 15th to the 17th century ===
Toward the end of the Middle Ages the number of the Frankfurt Jews was considerably increased by emigrants from Nuremberg (1498); and Frankfurt replaces Nuremberg as the leading Jewish community in the empire. This is seen in the numerous requests made by other cities to the magistrates of Frankfurt for information concerning their method of procedure in cases affecting Jews. Civil cases were decided by a commission of twelve, with the chief rabbi at its head. The reports of this commission from 1645 to 1808 are in the archives of the community. In 1509 the Jews were threatened with confiscation of their Hebrew books by Pfefferkorn, who arrived in the city with an imperial edict; on April 10, 1510, they were obliged to surrender all their books, which were not restored to them until June 6, after they had sent a special embassy to the emperor. In 1525 the impending danger of expulsion was averted by the municipal council; but the Jews were restricted in their commerce and were forbidden to build their houses higher than three stories. Although this measure crowded them more closely, there were 43 Jewish families in Frankfurt in 1543, and 454 in 1612.

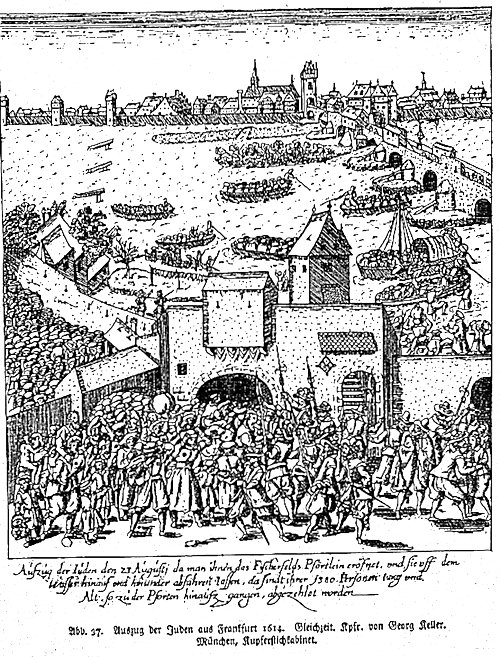
Expulsion of Jews from Frankfurt in 1614

Hard times were now approaching. In 1612 the Jews of Frankfurt suffered much on account of some persons who were heavily indebted to them, chief among these being Fettmilch. On August 22, 1614, these men headed an attack on the Jews' street, sweeping away everything in the space of thirteen hours; and the unfortunate Jews, who had sought refuge in the cemetery, begged for permission to depart. On the following day 1,380 Jews, glad to have saved even their lives, left the city and went to Offenbach, Hanau, and Höchst. The synagogue as well as the Torah-scrolls were destroyed, and the cemetery was desecrated. When the emperor heard of the affair he proscribed Fettmilch; but the Jews were not brought back until February 1616, when their street was placed under the protection of the emperor and the empire, as announced in a notice affixed to each of the three gates. By 1618 there were 370 families, living in 195 houses, of which 111 lay to the right of the Bornheimerpforte, and 84 to the left. The houses were of wood, with stone foundations, and were named according to signs suspended in front. The names were those of animals (e.g., ox, duck, wild duck), fruits (apple, red apple), trees (fir, elder, nut), or miscellaneous objects (tongs, scales, winecup); but sometimes a house was named simply from the color of the shield, e.g., red= "Rothschild"; black = "Schwarzschild." The main synagogue was built in 1462; a smaller one was erected in 1603. Among the other communal buildings were the bath, to the east of the synagogue, the dance house, the inn, the slaughterhouse, the bakehouse, and the hospital.

With their return to Frankfurt a new epoch in the history of the Jews of that city begins. They were still debarred from acquiring real estate, but they loaned money, even accepting manuscripts as pledges. The rate of interest, formerly as high as 24 percent, was now reduced to 8 percent. As the unredeemed pledges were sold, traffic in second-hand goods arose, which was further stimulated by the fact that the Jews were not permitted to sell new goods. They were also forbidden to deal in spices, provisions, weapons, cloth, and (from 1634 on) grain. But in spite of these interdictions, their commerce gradually increased. During the Thirty Years' War the Jews fared no worse than their neighbors. In 1694 there were 415 Jewish families; of these, 109 persons were engaged as moneylenders and dealers in second-hand goods; 106 dealt in dry goods, clothes, and trimmings; 24 in spices and provisions; 9 retailed wine and beer; 3 were innkeepers; and 2 had restaurants. Besides these there were the communal officials.

=== 18th century ===
The importance and status of the community at the beginning of the eighteenth century are indicated by the gracious reception accorded to the deputation that offered presents to Joseph I on his visit to Heidelberg in 1702. On January 14, 1711, a fire which broke out in the house of Rabbi Naphtali Cohen destroyed the synagogue together with nearly the whole Judengasse. The rabbi was accused of having caused the fire by cabalistic means and was forced to leave the city. The 8,000 homeless Jews found shelter either in the pest house or with compassionate Christians. The synagogue and the dwelling houses were speedily rebuilt, and the street was widened six feet. In 1715 the community issued an edict against luxury. From 1718 onward the "Residenten", or representatives of the community of Frankfurt at Vienna, were accorded official recognition. In 1721 part of the Judengasse was again destroyed by fire. About the same period, conflicts with the Shabbethaians (a messianic Jewish sect) caused excitement in the community. In consequence of the denunciation of a baptized Jew the edition of the Talmud published at Frankfurt and Amsterdam between the years 1714 and 1721 was confiscated; and certain prayer books were likewise seized on account of the "Alenu" prayer. The books were restored, however, on Aug. 1, 1753, chiefly through the efforts of Moses Kann.

The middle of the century was marked by the dissensions between the Kann and Kulp parties. The Kulp party, to which many influential men belonged, endeavored to harmonize the ancient constitution of the community with new measures for the benefit of the people; but their efforts were thwarted by the wealthy Kann family, whose influence was predominant both in the government of the community and among the people. In 1750 the two parties effected a compromise, which was, however, of but short duration. The community was further excited by Jonathan Eybeschütz's amulet controversy. In 1756 the Jews received permission to leave their street in urgent cases on Sundays and feast days for the purpose of fetching a physician or a barber or mailing a letter, but they were required to return by the shortest way. In 1766 the Cleve divorce controversy began to excite the rabbinate of Frankfurt also. At the coronation of Joseph II. the Frankfurt Jews were permitted for the first time to appear in public, when they swore allegiance to the emperor (May 28, 1764). The community of Frankfurt rendered great service in suppressing Eisenmenger's "Entdecktes Judenthum", confiscating all the copies in 1700. Eisenmenger sued the community for 30,000 gulden. Although he lost his case, proceedings were several times renewed with the aid of King Frederick I of Prussia, and only in 1773 was the community finally released from all claims brought by Eisenmenger's heirs.

In 1753 there were 204 houses, built on both sides of the Jews' street. On May 29, 1774, a fire destroyed 21 dwellings, and the homeless again found shelter in the houses of Christians. When their houses were rebuilt, the Jews endeavored to remain outside of the ghetto but were forced to return by a decree of Feb. 13, 1776. One hundred and forty houses on the Jews' street were destroyed by fire when the French bombarded the city in 1796.

=== The Cemetery ===
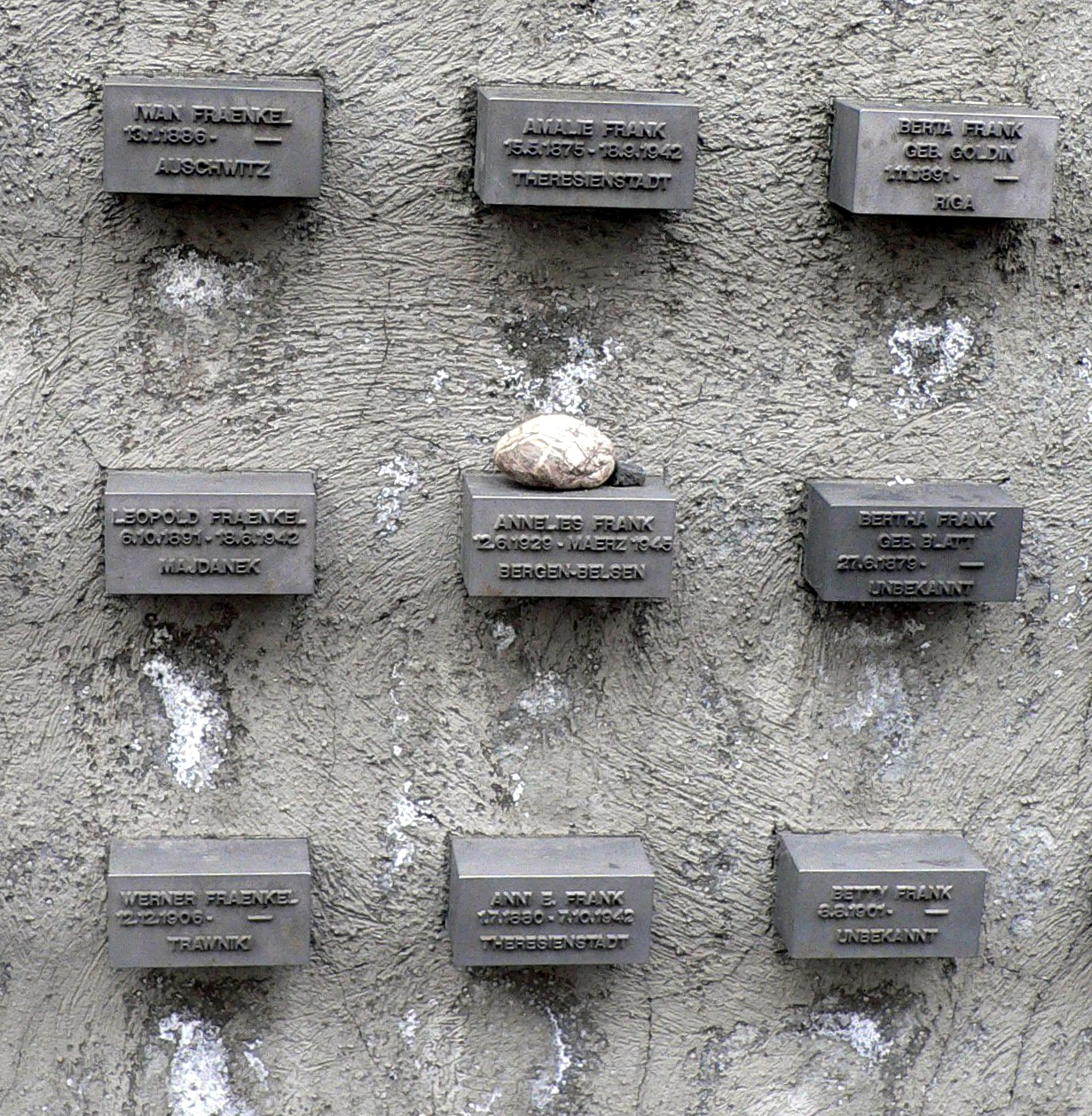
Memorial to the 11,134 Frankfurt citizens killed during the Holocaust - Anne Frank's name is located in the center of the picture with a rock placed on her memorial.

The Jewish cemetery, as mentioned above, is situated on the old Fischerfeld. In 1349 the cemetery was enclosed within the city moat and walls, which were fortified with jetties. Beginning in 1424 the neighboring communities also buried their dead there; but this privilege was withdrawn by the magistrate in 1505. When Frankfurt was besieged during the interregnum in 1552, a garrison with cannon was stationed in the cemetery, and an attempt was even made to force the Jews to sink the tombstones and to level the ground; but against this they protested successfully (July 15, 1552). During the Fettmilch riots the whole community spent the night of September 1, 1614, in the cemetery, prepared for death, and thought themselves fortunate when they were permitted to leave the city through the Fischerfeld gate on the following afternoon. In 1640 a dispute in regard to passage through the cemetery was decided in favor of the Jews. The community occasionally paid damages to Christians who were injured by the oxen (bekorim, the first-born that may not be used in accordance with Exodus xiii. 3) that grazed within the cemetery walls. In 1694 a neighboring garden was bought for the purpose of enlarging the cemetery. During the great fire of 1711 the Jews sought refuge withall their possessions among the tombs of the fathers. The communal baking ovens, which before the fire were behind the synagogue, were transferred to a new site acquired in 1694. The only building preserved from the flames was the hospital for the poor, near the cemetery; behind it, another hospital was built in 1715 to replace the one in the Judengasse that had been destroyed. A slaughterhouse for poultry and a fire station were erected between the ovens and the cemetery. The fire station existed down to 1882; the site of the ovens is now covered by the handsome building of the Sick Fund, and that of the Holzplatz and the garden by the Philanthropin schoolhouse. On the site of the two hospitals the Neue Gemeinde-Synagoge was built in 1882. The cemetery, covering more than 5 acres (20,000 m^{2}), was closed in 1828; its epitaphs have been published by Dr. M. Horovitz.

The end of the eighteenth century marks a new epoch for the Jews of Frankfurt. In 1796 they received permission to live among Christians. In 1811 the prince-primate granted them full civic equality. In 1809 they were already scattered throughout the city and had taken surnames. A reaction, however, came in 1816, when the city, on regaining its autonomy, completely excluded the Jews from the municipal government. In 1819 there were riots to the cry of "Hep-hep!", and the magistrate discussed the advisability of restricting the number of Jews to not more than 500 families and of assigning to them a special part of the city. These schemes, however, were not carried into effect. In 1853 the civic rights of the Jews were enlarged, and in 1864 all restrictions were removed. The synagogue that had been rebuilt after the fire of 1711 in the Judengasse was torn down in 1854, and a new synagogue was erected on the site (1855–60). The synagogue on the Börneplatz was consecrated in 1882. The Israelitische Religionsgesellschaft, an independent congregation founded in 1851 (incorporated 1900), built a synagogue in 1853 and enlarged it in 1874. In 1817 there were 4,309 Jews in Frankfurt; in 1858, 5,730; in 1871, 10,009; in 1880, 13,856; in 1890, 17,479; and in 1900, 22,000 in a total population of 288,489.

==== Rabbis and scholars ====
The following rabbis and scholars of Frankfurt are buried here:

- Simeon Darshan (cf. darshan), author of "Yalkut Shim'oni."
- Alexander Süsslin, author of the collection "Aguddah."
- R. Isaac ben Nathan, a victim of the first "Judenschlacht" (1241).
- Anselm, 1288.
- Abraham of Hanau (cf. Hanau), 1332.
- Gumprecht, martyr in 1349.
- Joseph Lampe (cf. Lampe), 1363.
- Asher, 1374.
- Meïr ben Samuel of Nordhausen, 1385; took part in the convention of rabbis at Mainz in 1381.
- Süsslin of Speyer, 1394.
- Nathan Levi, 1430–60.
- Simon Cohen, a relative of Moses Minz.
- Israel Rheinbach; held office till 1505.
- Isaac ben Eliakim; took part in the convention of rabbis at, Worms in 1542.
- Naphtali Treves, author.
- Herz Treves, son of the preceding; also an author.
- Akiba Frankfurt; widely known as a preacher; died in 1597. The Maharal of Prague, delivered the funeral oration.
- Simon of Aschaffenburg (cf. Aschaffenburg), author of a supercommentary to Rashi's Pentateuch commentary; lived at Frankfurt until his death.
- Elia Loanz, pupil of Akiba Frankfurt; wrote a song, "Streit Zwischen Wasser und Wein," to the melody of "Dietrich von Bern", and many other works; was a native of Frankfurt.
- Eliezer Treves.
- Abraham Naphtali Herz Levi.
- Samuel ben Eliezer of Friedberg (cf. Friedberg), during whose incumbency the most important event was the convention of rabbis held at Frankfurt in 1603.
- Isaiah Horowitz; called to Frankfurt in 1606; went to Prague in 1622. He was the author of the kabalistic work "Shnei Luchoth ha-Brith."
- Joseph Juspa Hahn (cf. Hahn), author of a work dealing with the liturgy and with the chief phases of religious life; officiated up to the time of his death in 1637.
- Samuel Hildesheim (cf.Hildesheim); elected in 1618.
- Pethahiah; elected 1622; author of the cabalistic work "Sefer ha-Kavonot," which relates the events in connection with the Fettmilch riot and which was approved by Elhanan Helen, author of the "Megillat Winz."
- Hayyim Cohen of Prague, grandson of the Maharal of Prague; officiated in 1628.
- Shabbethai Horowitz, son of Isaiah Horowitz; elected in 1632. He was the author of "Vavei ha-'Ammudim," the introduction to his father's work. In 1643 he went, like his predecessor, to Posen.
- Meïr Schiff, author of novellæ to the Talmud; born at Frankfurt in 1605; died while rabbi of Fulda in 1641, just after he had been called to the rabbinate of Prague; was buried at Frankfurt.
- Mendel Barr of Kraków; elected in 1644; died in 1666. He was a pupil of Joel Sirkes, and inclined toward the Kabalah. Among his prominent pupils were Yair Bacharach and Meïr Stern.
- Aaron Samuel Kaidanover of Wilna; called to Frankfurt in 1667; went to Kraków in 1677. He was the author of "Birkath ha-Zevach," commentary to some treatises of the Talmud.
- Isaiah Horowitz II, son of Shabbethai Horowitz, and grandson of Isaiah Horowitz. David Grünhut, kabalist, cited by Johann Andreas Eisenmenger and Johann Jakob Schudt, was his contemporary. Hurwitz went to Posen.
- Samuel b. Zebi of Kraków; elected 1690. He added valuable references to the Frankfurt edition of the Talmud (1721). His son, Judah Aryeh Löb, known as a writer, was associate rabbi; Löb's father-in-law, Samuel Schotten, though rabbi at Darmstadt, was living at Frankfurt as "Klaus" rabbi, and after Samuel ben Zebi's death (1703) he became president of the rabbinate.
- Naphtali Cohen; called in 1704. As stated above, he was accused of having caused the fire of 1711, and, being compelled to leave the city, he wandered about for many years.
- Moses Frankfurter, author of a commentary to the Mechilta.
- Joseph ben Moses Kossmann, author of "Noheg ke-tzon Yosef," a work on the ritual of the community of Frankfurt.
- Pethahiah ben David Lida, who issued in 1727 at Frankfurt his father's "Yad Kol Bo." The book was confiscated but was restored with the approval of several professors and preachers.

Naphtali Cohen's successors in the rabbinate of Frankfurt were as follows:

- Abraham Broda of Prague; died in 1717; famous both as a writer and as a scholar.
- Jacob Cohen Popers of Prague; called from Coblenz to Frankfurt. He was noted for his many pupils and for his learned correspondence, which is included in the responsa collection "Shev Ya'akov." He became involved in the current controversies in regard to Shabbethaism.
- Jacob Joshua Falk (1741–56); known to Talmudists through his valuable Talmud commentary "Pnei Yehoshua" and to historians through his conflict with Jonathan Eybeschütz. During his rabbinate occurred the Kann-Kulp controversy mentioned above. Kulp's party was opposed to the rabbi and sided with Eybeschütz. Falk had to leave the city in consequence of this disturbance. He died at Offenbach am Main in 1756, at the age of 75, and was buried at Frankfurt.
- Moses Kann, Moses Rapp, and Nathan Maas took charge of the rabbinate until 1759. Maas was the real leader in the controversy in which the rabbinate of Frankfurt engaged with reference to the divorce granted at Cleve (referred to above), as his opinion was authoritative.
- Abraham Lissa; elected in 1759; died in 1768. He was a notable Talmudist, and the author of "Birkath Avrohom"; he also studied medicine. Maas again acted as deputy rabbi from 1769 to 1771; he is also known through his commentary to two treatises of the Talmud.
- Pinchas Horowitz; elected 1771; died 1805. He was the author of "Hafla'ah" and other Talmudic works. Prominent scholars were at that time living at Frankfurt; among them David Tebele Scheuer, who became rabbi at Mainz, and Nathan Adler, a strict ritualist, who gathered about him a group of men that attempted to introduce Chasidism into Frankfurt. The community, with the consent of the rabbi, soon found it necessary to proceed against Adler. Hurwitz also opposed the school of David Mendelssohn.
- Hirsch Hurwitz, son of Pinchas Horowitz; died September 8, 1817. He was the author of several haggadic and halachik works.
- Leopold Stein; elected 1844; officiated down to 1862; also known as poet and writer.
- Abraham Geiger, Samson Raphael Hirsch, Solomon Breuer, Nehemiah Brüll, M. Horovitz, and Rudolph Plaut succeeded Leopold Stein in the order named; Seligsohn was elected to the office in 1903.

=== Philanthropic Institutions ===
Among the philanthropic institutions of Frankfurt the following are important:

- Achawa (Verein zur Brüderlichkeit; 1864).
- Almosenkasten der Israelitischen Gemeinde (1845).
- Biḳḳur Ḥolim (1889).
- Hersheim'sche Stiftung (for education of poor boys; 1865).
- Georgine Sara von Rothschild'sche Stiftung (1870; hospital, 1878).
- Gumpertz'sches Siechenhaus (1888).
- Israelitische Religionsschule (1890).
- Israelitische Volksschule (1882).
- Israelitische Waisenanstalt (founded 1873).
- Israelitischer Hülfsverein (1883).
- Israelitischer Kranken-Unterstützungs Verein (1843).
- Israelitisches Frauen-Krankenhaus (society, 1761; hospital, 1831).
- Israelitisches Gemeinde-Hospital (1875).
- Israelitisches Kinderhospital.
- Jüdische Haushaltungsschule.
- Kindergarten für Israeliten (1890).
- Lemaan Zion, Palästinensischer Hülfsverein.
- Mädchenstift (1877).
- Realschule der Israelitischen Gemeinde (Philanthropin; founded by Sigmund Geisenheimer 1804).
- Realschule der Israelitischen Religionsgesellschaft (1883).
- Sigmund Stern'sche Waisenstiftung (1874).
- Suppenanstalt für Israelitische Arme.
- Verein zur Beförderung der Handwerke.
- Verein für Jüdische Krankenpflegerinnen.
- Versorgungs-Anstalt für Israeliten (1845).
- Waisenhaus des Israelitischen Frauenvereins (1847); and a number of private "Stiftungen" established for various purposes.
- For Jewish physicians see Horovitz "Jüdische Aerzte".

=== Bibliography ===
- Georg Ludwig Kriegk, Bürgerzwiste;
- Otto Stobbe, Die Juden in Deutschland, Brunswick, 1866;
- Karl Bücher, Die Bevölkerung von Frankfurt-am-Main, Tübingen, 1886;
- Horovitz, Frankfurter Rabbinen;
  - idem, Inschriften des Alten Friedhofs . . . zu Frankfurt, Frankfurt, 1901;
- Schudt, Jüdische Merckwürdigkeiten, Frankfurt, 1714–17;
- Baerwald, Der Alte Friedhof der Israelitischen Gemeinde zu Frankfurt, 1883;
- Horovitz, Die Frankfurter Rabbinerversammlung vom Jahre 1603, ib. 1897;
- Frankfurter Israel. Volks-Kalender, 1882 et seq.

=== Publishing ===
The law of this free city decreeing that no Jew should establish a printing house there greatly impeded the development of Hebrew publishing in Frankfurt. Many books published there, especially prayer books, appeared without place of publication or publisher's name. Owing to this restriction, the printing requirements of Frankfurt were in large measure met by Jewish presses established in neighboring towns and villages, such as Hanau, Homburg, Offenbach, and Rödelheim, the last-named place being specially notable. Besides the local wants of Frankfurt there was the yearly fair which was practically the center of the German-Jewish book trade. In a measure the presses of the above four towns were really intended to supply the fair trade of Frankfurt.

According to Wolf ("Bibl. Hebr." ii. 1385), the history of Hebrew typography at Frankfurt-on-the-Main begins with 1625, in which year seliḥot were printed there. But Steinschneider and Cassel declare this statement doubtful. The chronogram of a certain prayer book seems to show that it was printed there in 1656, but this chronogram is known only from references to it in a second edition printed at Amsterdam in 1658 ("Cat. Bodl." Nos. 2149, 2152). It may be said with certainty, however, that Hebrew printing began in Frankfurt not later than 1662, when the Pentateuch with a German glossary was printed. The books printed at Frankfurt up to 1676 do not bear any printer's name.

From the year 1677 till the beginning of the eighteenth century there were two Christian printing establishments in Frankfurt at which Hebrew books were printed: (1) The press owned till 1694 by Balthasar Christian Wust, who began with David Clodius' Hebrew Bible; his last work was the unvocalized Bible prepared by Eisenmenger, 1694; up to 1707 the press was continued by John Wust. Among his typesetters who worked on the "Amarot Ṭehorot" (1698) and the responsa "Ḥawwot Yaïr" were two Christians: Christian Nicolas and John Kaspar Pugil. (2) That of Blasius Ilsnerus, who printed in 1682 the "Ḥiddushe Haggadot" of Samuel Edels. Many works that appeared in the last quarter of the seventeenth century without bearing the names of either printers or publishers probably belong to the publications of Isaac and Seligmann, sons of Hirz Reis, who in 1687 published a beautiful edition of the Yalḳuṭ. Although the proprietors of the presses were Christians, the publishers were often Jews; among them may be mentioned Joseph Trier Cohen (1690–1715), Leser Schuch, Solomon Hanau, and Solomon and Abraham, sons of Kalman, who in 1699 published through John Wust the Alfasi in three volumes.

The greatest period of Hebrew publishing in Frankfurt was the first quarter of the eighteenth century. Hebrew books were printed in several establishments, including those of Mat. Andrea (1707–10), Jo. Ph. Andrea (1716), Nicolas Weinmann (1709), Antony Heinscheit (1711–19), and, above all, John Kölner, who during the twenty years of his activity (1708–27) furnished half of the Hebrew works printed at Frankfurt up to the middle of the nineteenth century. Among the more important works printed by Kölner may be mentioned the "Bayit Ḥadash", in 5 vols., corrected by Samuel Dresles (1712–16), and the continuation of the Babylonian Talmud (1720–23) begun at Amsterdam, between which city and Frankfurt there was a sort of partnership in printing. Kölner printed with the same Amsterdam type the "Yeshu'ah be-Yisrael" (1719–20). He then conceived the idea of printing the Alfasi after the model of the Sabbionetta edition of 1554, a copy of which was bought for 40 thalers. He resolved upon printing 1,700 copies at the price of 10 thalers each; the expenses, 11,000 thalers, were to have been obtained by means of a lottery; that is to say, each subscriber was entitled to a copy of the book and to a lottery ticket; but the whole plan miscarried.

Between the years 1726 and 1736 no Hebrew printing appears to have been done in Frankfurt, and during the last three-quarters of the eighteenth century very few Hebrew works were printed there. Among those printed "Toledot Adam", a Hebrew letter-writer printed in 1736; and in 1742 the responsa "Sheb Ya'aḳob", the three Babot of the Jerusalem Talmud, and the second part of the "Pene Yehoshua'", the third part appearing in 1756. Abraham Broda's "Eshel Abraham" was issued in 1776. Hebrew printing has continued at Frankfurt up to the present day.

== See also ==
- Norbert Wollheim
- Timeline of Frankfurt am Main
