= Verga =

Verga is a Spanish surname.

In Spanish, a verga is a part of the mast of a sailing ship, from Latin virga, 'strip of wood'.

== People ==
- Alejandro Verga, Argentine field hockey player
- Bob Verga, American basketball player
- Giovanni Verga, Italian writer
- Joseph ibn Verga, 16th-century Spanish rabbi
- Judah ibn Verga, 15th-century Spanish rabbi
- Solomon ibn Verga, 15th-century Spanish rabbi
- Valentin Verga, Argentine-Dutch field hockey player
- Mario Verga, Italian speedboat pilot

== Places ==
=== United States ===
- Vergas, Minnesota
- Verga, New Jersey
