= Bodenschatz =

Bodenschatz is a German surname. Notable people with the surname include:

- Eberhard Bodenschatz (born 1959), German physicist
- Johann Christian Georg Bodenschatz (1717–1797), German Protestant theologian
- Karl Bodenschatz (1890–1979), German military officer
