= Joseph ibn Verga =

Joseph ibn Verga (Hebrew: יוסף אבן וירגה) was a Turkish rabbi and historian who lived at Adrianople at the beginning of the 16th century.

He was the son of Solomon ibn Verga, author of Shebeṭ Yehudah (Scepter of Judah) who emigrated from Spain to Turkey as a Marrano. Joseph was a pupil of Joseph Fasi, a contemporary of Tam ibn Yaḥya and of the physician Moses Hamon, and belonged to the college of rabbis of Adrianople.

He completed his father's work by adding a record of some of the events of his own time and of the age immediately preceding. He knew Latin, and incorporated in the Shebeṭ Yehudah some narratives which he translated from what he calls the "Christian language". He also added a supplication ("teḥinnah") written by himself.

Joseph was the author of She'erit Yosef, a methodology of the Talmud, giving the rules that are wanting in the Halikhot 'Olam of Yeshu'ah ha-Levi and in the Sefer Keritut of Samson of Chinon. However, Wolf (Bibl. Hebr. i., No. 880) attributes this book to another Joseph ibn Verga, who lived at Avlona.

== Jewish Encyclopedia bibliography ==
- David Conforte, Ḳore ha-Dorot, p. 34a;
- Azulai, Shem ha-Gedolim, i. 39;
- Heinrich Grätz, Gesch. 3d ed., ix. 321, 323, 324;
- Moritz Steinschneider, Cat. Bodl. col. 1538;
- Julius Fürst, Bibl. Jud. iii. 473.
