= Robert Schuman Medal, EPP Group =

Robert Schuman Medal named after Robert Schuman is awarded to several people annually by the European People's Party group in the European Parliament since July 1986 "to pay tribute to public figures who have advanced the cause of peace, the construction of Europe and human values through their public activities and personal commitment."

== Lauretes ==
Name	Year	Country
1986	E. M. J. A. Sassen	Netherlands
1986	Alain Poher	France
1986	Hans August Lücker	West Germany
1986	Alfred Bertrand	Belgium
1986	Paolo Barbi	Italy
1986	Pierre Pflimlin	France
1986	Leo Tindemans	Belgium
1986	Emilio Colombo	Italy
1986	Helmut Kohl	West Germany
1986	Jacques Santer	Luxemburg
1986	Konstantinos Mitsotakis	Greece
1986	Konstantinos Karamanlis	Greece
1987	Willem Vergeer	Netherlands
1987	Giulio Andreotti	Italy
1987	Flaminio Piccoli	Italy
1987	Mariano Rumor	Italy
1987	Piet Bukman	Netherlands
1987	Adelino Amaro da Costa (posthumously)	Portugal
1987	Karl-Josef Hahn	West Germany
1987	Miquel Coll i Alentorn	Spain
1987	Bruno Heck	West Germany
1987	Pierre Werner	Luxemburg
1988	Kai-Uwe von Hassel	West Germany
1988	Francesco Cosentino	Italy
1988	Lorenzo Natali	Italy
1988	Peter Sutherland	Ireland
1988	Karl-Heinz Narjes	West Germany
1988	Nicolas Mosar	Luxemburg
1988	Guido Gonella (posthumously)	Italy
1988	Alberto Ghergo (posthumously)	Italy
1988	Angelo Narducci (posthumously)	Italy
1988	Mario Sassano (posthumously)	Italy
1988	Heinrich Aigner (posthumously)	West Germany
1989	Henry Plumb	United Kingdom
1990	Johanna Maij-Weggen	Netherlands
1991	Jean-Claude Juncker	Luxemburg
1991	Norbert Schmelzer	Netherlands
1991	Ruud Lubbers	Netherlands
1992	Egon Klepsch	Germany
1993	Valéry Giscard d'Estaing	France
1993	Filippo Maria Pandolfi	Italy
1993	Jean Dondelinger	Luxemburg
1993	Frans Andriessen	Netherlands
1993	Bernhard Sälzer (posthumously)	Germany
1993	Lorenzo de Vitto (posthumously)	Italy
1993	Abel Matutes Juan	Spain
1993	Raniero Vanni d'Archirafi	Italy
1993	Peter Schmidhuber	Germany
1993	Ioannis Paleokrassas	Greece
1993	René Streichen	France
1995	Jacques Delors	France
1995	Manuel García Amigo	Spain
1995	Menelaos Chatzigeorgiou	Greece
1995	Horst Langes	Germany
1995	Ferruccio Pisoni	Italy
1995	Rudolf Luster	Germany
1995	Günter Rinsche	Germany
1995	Hans-Gert Poettering	Germany
1995	Margaretha af Ugglas	Sweden
1995	Carlos Robles Piquer	Spain
1995	Georgios Anastassopoulos	Greece
1995	José Maria Gil-Robles Gil-Delgado	Spain
1995	Antonio Graziani	Italy
1995	Nicolas Estgen	Luxemburg
1995	Christopher Prout	United Kingdom
1995	Otto Bardong	Germany
1995	Wilfried Martens	Belgium
1996	Efthimios Christodoulou	Greece
1996	Miltiadis Evert	Greece
1996	Panayotis Lambrias	Greece
1996	Siegbert Alber	Germany
1996	Edward Heath	United Kingdom
1997	John Bruton	Ireland
1997	Hans von der Groeben	Germany
1997	Manuel Fraga Iribarne	Spain
1997	Gerardo Fernández Albor	Spain
1997	Franjo Komarica	Bosnia and Herzegovina
1998	Ursula Schleicher	Germany
1998	Aníbal Cavaco Silva	Portugal
1999	Arthur Eisenmenger (received by Rainer Wieland)	Germany
1999	Poul Schlüter	Denmark
1999	Francisco António Lucas Pires (posthumously)	Portugal
1999	Radio B92, Belgrade (received by Veran Matić)	Serbia and Montenegro
2000	Martin M.C. Lee	United Kingdom
2000	Libet Werhahn-Adenauer	Germany
2001	Jelena Bonner	Russia
2001	Karl von Wogau	Germany
2002	Nicole Fontaine	France
2002	Ingo Friedrich	Germany
2002	Władysław Bartoszewski	Poland
2002	José María Aznar	Spain
2002	Hans van den Broek	Netherlands
2003	Wim van Velzen	Netherlands
2003	Bendt Bendtsen	Denmark
2003	Anders Fogh Rasmussen	Denmark
2003	Bertel Haarder	Denmark
2003	Per Stig Møller	Denmark
2003	Nicholas Bethell, 4th Baron Bethell	United Kingdom
2004	John Joseph McCartin	Ireland
2004	Franz Fischler	Austria
2004	Loyola de Palacio	Spain
2004	Chris Patten	United Kingdom
2004	Mario Monti	Italy
2004	Viviane Reding	Luxemburg
2004	Pope John Paul II	Poland
2005	Natalia Estemirova	Russia
2005	Sergei Kovalev	Russia
2005	Erwin Teufel	Germany
2005	Tadeusz Mazowiecki	Poland
2005	Wolfgang Schäuble	Germany
2005	Michel Barnier	France
2005	Vytautas Landsbergis	Lithuania
2006	Tunne Kelam	Estonia
2007	Angela Merkel	Germany
2007	Guido de Marco	Italy
2009	Marianne Thyssen	Belgium
2009	Jaime Mayor Oreja	Spain
2009	Hartmut Nassauer	Germany
2009	João de Deus Pinheiro	Portugal
2009	Ioannis Varvitsiotis	Greece
2009	José Manuel Barroso	Portugal
2009	Jacques Barrot	France
2009	László Tőkés	Romania
2010	Alberto João Jardim	Portugal
2012	Pietro Adonnino	Italy
2012	Peter Hintze	Germany
2012	Íñigo Méndez de Vigo	Spain
2012	Eddie Fenech Adami	Malta
2013	Reiner Kunze	Germany
2014	George H. W. Bush	United States
2014	Jerzy Buzek	Czech Republic
2014	Joseph Daul	France
2014	Marietta Giannakou	Greece
2014	Doris Pack	Germany
2014	Alojz Peterle	Slovenia
2014	Corien Wortmann	Netherlands
2014	Vito Bonsignore	Italy
2014	Ria Oomen-Ruijten	Netherlands
2015	Wolfgang Welsch	Germany
2015	Jim Sensenbrenner	United States
2015	Karel Schwarzenberg	Czech Republic
2016	Ilkka Suominen	Finland
2017	Andreas Schockenhoff	Germany
2017	Lawrence Gonzi	Matla
