= Vergas =

Vergas may refer to:

- Battle of Vergas, June 1826
- Vergas, Minnesota, United States

== See also ==
- Verga (disambiguation)
