= Aaron ben Samuel of Hergershausen =

Yiddish author

- אהרון בן שמואל מהערגרשויתה
- Born: 1665
- Died: c. 1732
- Occupation: Writer
- Writing career
- Language: Yiddish

Aaron ben Samuel of Hergershausen (Hebrew: אהרון בן שמואל מהערגרשויתה, romanized: Aharon ben Shmuel me-Hergersoyse; 1665–c. 1732) was a Hessian Jewish writer. He is considered to be the first person in Germany to attempt to bring about the use of the vernacular in lieu of the Hebrew in the daily prayers.

He began his career as a small trader or pedlar, later becoming a distiller of brandy for sale in his tavern. In 1709 he published in Frankfurt his Liebliche tefiloh, oder kreftige artznai for guf un neshomoh ('A Lovely Prayer, or a Tonic for Body and Soul'), a volume of prayers and personal supplications in Yiddish. Though not the first Yiddish adaptation of the siddur, the work was original in that it sought to give a literary form to the vernacular version, by amplifying considerably the original text of the prayers. The object of the writer is clearly expressed in the introduction to the book, namely, to bring about the substitution of this Yiddish version for the Hebrew text in those spheres in which Hebrew was no longer understood.

In the early nineteenth century, hundreds of copies of Liebliche tefiloh were found in the attic of a synagogue. In an 1846 article, Rabbi Leopold Stein of Frankfurt claimed that the work had fallen into obscurity because of a ban by the Palatinate Orthodox rabbinate. No evidence of such a ban, however, has been found.
