= Moses Hamon =

Ottoman-Jewish physician

Moses Amon also known as Moses Hamon (Granada, c. 1490 – 1554) (Amon) was the son of Joseph Hamon, born in Spain. Going with his father to Constantinople, he became physician to Suleiman the Magnificent. This "famous prince and great physician", as he is called by Judah ibn Verga, accompanied the monarch on all his expeditions, enjoying great favor on account of his knowledge and skill.

Amon was a fine linguist, versed in Arabic, Turkish, and Persian, and was a patron of Jewish learning. He printed some Hebrew works at Constantinople as early as 1515 and 1516. He also built in that city, at his own cost, a school which was presided over by the learned Joseph Taitazak of Salonica. He did not, however, translate the Pentateuch into Persian, nor the prayers of the Israelites into Turkish, as Manasseh b. Israel records, but he had Jacob Tavus' Persian Pentateuch translation, together with Saadia's Arabic translation, printed at his own expense in 1546.

Amon, who was everywhere highly respected on account of his firm character and philanthropy, was a fearless advocate of his coreligionists. When about 1545 the Jews of Amasya were falsely accused of having murdered a Christian for ritual purposes, and the innocence of those that had been executed was established soon after by the reappearance of the missing man, Hamon induced the sultan to decree that thenceforward no accusation of the kind should be entertained by any judge of the country, but should be referred to the royal court (see Danon in El Progreso, i. 148 et seq., where a legendary account of the event is given, probably taken from Me'ora'ot 'Olam, Constantinople, 1756).

Amon was also called upon to decide communal difficulties. After an affray which arose in the Jewish community of Salonica, Hamon summoned the instigators to Constantinople and induced the sultan to send a judge to Salonica to investigate the affair and to punish the guilty ones (see Danon, l.c. i. 162 et seq., 178 et seq., where several of Hamon's Hebrew letters are reprinted). The sultan, at Amon's request, exempted the latter's descendants from all taxes. He died in 1554.

== Jewish Encyclopedia bibliography ==
- David Conforte, Ḳore ha-Dorot, ed. Cassel. pp. 32b, 34b;
- Shebeṭ Yehudah, pp. 33, 53, 111;
- Joseph ha-Kohen, 'Emeḳ ha-Baka, p. 105;
- Samuel Usque, Consolaçao as Tribulaçoens de Yisrael, p. 208a;
- M. A. Levy, D. Joseph Nasi, Herzog von Naxos, und Zwei Jüdische Diplomaten Seiner Zeit, p. 6;
- Moritz Steinschneider, Hebr. Bibl. ii. 67, 83;
- Eliakim Carmoly, Histoire des Médecins Juifs, p. 159;
- Heinrich Grätz, Gesch. ix. 33, 339;
- R. E. J. xl. 230.
