= Euro sign =

Currency sign

€

Euro sign
- In Unicode: U+20AC € EURO SIGN (&euro;)

Currency
- Currency: Euro

Related
- See also: U+20A0 ₠ EURO-CURRENCY SIGN (predecessor).

The euro sign (€) is the currency sign used for the euro, the official currency of the eurozone. The design was presented to the public by the European Commission on 12 December 1996. It consists of a stylized Greek letter epsilon, Ε (lowercase: ε or ϵ), crossed by two lines instead of one. Depending on convention in each nation, the symbol can either precede or follow the value, e.g., €10 or 10 €, often with an intervening space.

== Design ==
Graphic construction of the euro logo

The euro sign in a selection of typefaces

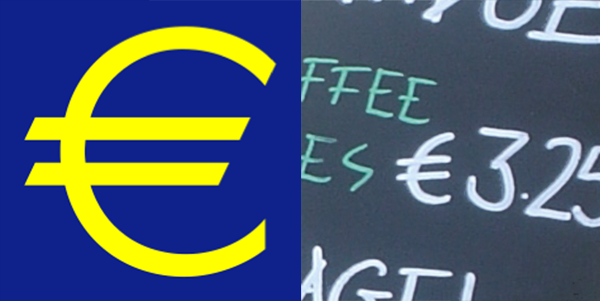
The euro sign; logotype and handwritten

There were originally 30 proposed designs for a symbol for Europe's new common currency. Of these, the Commission made a short-list of ten candidates and put these ten out to a public survey. The President of the European Commission at the time (Jacques Santer) and the European Commissioner with responsibility for the euro (Yves-Thibault de Silguy) then chose the winning design. The other designs that were considered but not shortlisted are not available for the public to view, nor is any information about the designers available for public query. The Commission considers the process of designing to have been internal and keeps these records secret. The eventual winner was a design created by a team of four experts whose identities have not been revealed. Gazet van Antwerpen has attributed the symbol to Belgian graphic designer Alain Billiet.

The symbol € is based on the Greek letter epsilon (ε), with the first letter in the word "Europe" and with 2 parallel lines signifying stability.

— European Union

The official story of the design history of the euro sign is disputed by Arthur Eisenmenger, a former chief graphic designer for the European Economic Community, who says he had the idea 25 years before the Commission's decision.

The Commission specified a euro logo with exact proportions and colours (PMS Yellow foreground, PMS Reflex Blue background), for use in public-relations material related to the euro introduction. While the Commission intended the logo to be a prescribed glyph shape, type designers made it clear that they intended instead to adapt the design to be consistent with the typefaces to which it was to be added.

== Usage ==
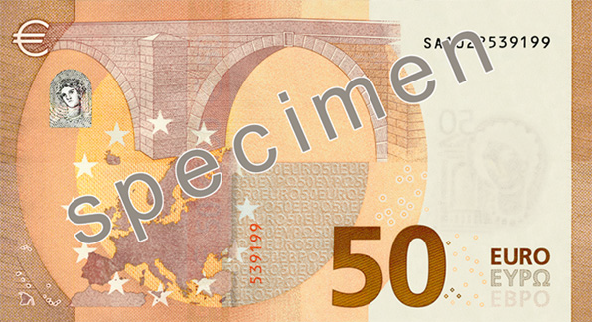
Euro sign appears in the top-left corner of a €50 banknote

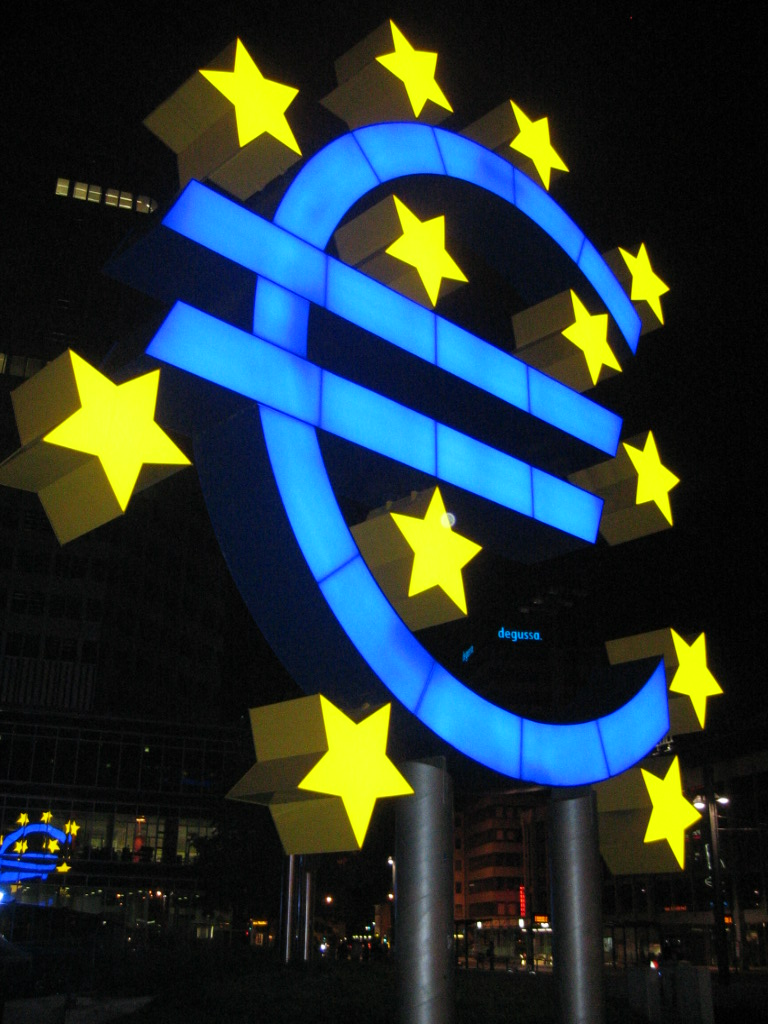
A euro light sculpture at the European Central Bank in Frankfurt

Placement of the sign varies. Countries have generally continued the style used for their former currencies. In those countries where previous convention was to place the currency sign before the figure, the euro sign is placed in the same position (e.g., €3.50). In those countries where the amount preceded the national currency sign, the euro sign is again placed in that relative position (e.g., 3,50 €).

In English, the euro sign – like the dollar sign ⟨$⟩ and the pound sign ⟨£⟩ – is usually placed before the figure, unspaced, the reverse of usage in many other European languages. When written out, "euro" is placed after the value in lower case; the plural is used for two or more units, (Note: Official practice for English-language EU legislation is to use the words euro and cent as both singular and plural. This practice is confirmed by the Directorate-General for Translation, (Note: Prior to Brexit, the style guide advised conventional plurals in English.) which states that the plural forms euro and cent should also be used in English.) and euro cents are separated with a full-stop, not a comma as in many countries (e.g., €1.50, 14 euros). The European Union's Interinstitutional Style Guide (for EU staff) states that the euro sign should be placed in front of the amount without any space in English, but after the amount in most other languages.

Prices of items costing less than one euro are often written using a local abbreviation like ct. (particularly in Spain and Lithuania); c. (Ireland); Λ (Greece (lambda)); snt. or written -, without any symbol (Finland). For example, 10 cents may be written as 10 ct., 10c., 10Λ, 10 snt. or -,10, depending on location. The US style ¢ is rarely seen in formal contexts. In all cases, prices may be written as decimals, e.g. €0.07 or 0,07 €, according to national conventions.

== Use on computers and mobile phones ==
The euro is encoded in Unicode as U+20AC € EURO SIGN. In modern computer systems and mobile phones, this is the only codepoint used. When first introduced, however, work to retrofit the symbol into crowded pre-existing character set standards and vendor-specific schemas presented challenges that were not fully resolved until widespread adoption of Unicode.

=== History of implementation ===
Initially, different vendors assigned the euro sign to different code positions in their historic encoding schemes. (Note: Most systems at the time conformed broadly to the ISO/IEC 8859 standard – but this had just 192 'printable' codepoints, all of which were allocated. Some vendors such as Apple used position A4, the generic currency sign (¤). Others, such as Microsoft, chose to ignore the part of the standard that reserved the codepoints 80 to 9F for another block of control characters, instead using them for characters that had not been encoded in the standard. In its Windows-1252 codepage, for example, Microsoft allocated 80 to the euro symbol. The effect of this was that documents exchanged between systems with different implementation choices would fail to display (or print) the euro symbol on arrival unless passed through a conversion process.) This led to some initial problems exchanging electronic documents containing the euro sign. This was not an issue when all participants used the same operating system (OS) but files transferred between users of different operating systems often produced errors. Initially, Apple, Microsoft and vendors of Unix systems each chose a different code point to represent a euro symbol. Thus a user of one OS might have written a euro symbol but, when the file was transferred to colleague using another OS, the colleague would see a different symbol, a question mark, or nothing at all.

Initially, some mobile phone companies issued an interim software update for their special SMS character set, replacing the (less-frequently-used in Europe) Japanese yen sign with the euro sign. Subsequent mobile phones have both currency signs.

In 1998, the Unicode Consortium allocated a unique codepoint (U+20AC € EURO SIGN) to this currency sign, with the release of Unicode 2.1, but it was still some time before many vendors integrated Unicode into their operating systems and applications.

=== Entry methods ===
Depending on keyboard layout and the operating system, there is a variety of ways to enter the symbol. The symbol is engraved on most keyboards used in Europe.

== See also ==
- Currency symbol § List of currency symbols currently in use
- U+20A0 ₠ EURO-CURRENCY SIGN (for the European Currency Unit, the unit of account of the European Community) and conceptual ancestor ot the euro.
- Representative glyph – Non-specific archetype to represent a grapheme
