= Eisenmenger =

Eisenmenger (German for "ironmonger") is a German surname. Notable people with the surname include:

- Arthur Eisenmenger (1914–2002), German graphic designer
- August Eisenmenger (1830–1907), Austrian painter
- Johann Andreas Eisenmenger (1654–1704), German orientalist
- Rudolf Eisenmenger (1902–1994), Austrian artist, painter
- Samuel Eisenmenger, genannt Sideocrates (1534–1585), German physician, theologian and astrologer
- Victor Eisenmenger (1864–1932) Austrian medical doctor, known for Eisenmenger's syndrome
- Wolfgang Eisenmenger (physicist) (1930–2016), German physicist
- Wolfgang Eisenmenger (born 1944), German forensic pathologist
- Gregory Eisenmenger (born 1952), American lawyer

== See also ==
- Eisenmenger's syndrome
