= Moses Kann =

Moses Kann was a German rabbi; born at Frankfurt am Main; died there 1761 or 1762; son of Löb Kann. He was chief rabbi of Hesse-Darmstadt and head of the Talmudical school at Frankfurt, which had been founded and richly endowed by his father-in-law, Samson Wertheimer, of Vienna. For over half a century this school flourished under Kann's guidance, and maintained the high reputation of Frankfurt as a seat of Talmudic study. By his energy and activity in behalf of the Jews, Moses Kann's name became celebrated throughout German Jewry. He and his father-in-law furnished the means for the publication of a new edition of the Talmud (the Frankfurt-Amsterdam edition); but through the denunciations of a baptized Jew, Paul Christian, this edition and a number of prayer-books were confiscated. By the testimony of the Berlin court preacher Jablonski and the consistorial councillor Scharden of Halle, supported by the opinion of twenty-four Christian professors and preachers who, in 1728, had declared that "neither the Jewish prayer-book nor the Talmud contained anything derogatory to Christianity," Moses Kann proved before the Elector of Mainz the bad character of the apostate. On 1 August 1753, the Imperial Court rescinded the order of confiscation of these books.

Moses Kann's name is perpetuated in the memoir-book of the Frankfurt congregation; Meïr ben Eliakim Götz, in "Eben ha-Shoham," responsa, praises him as his benefactor, and Eleazar Kallir, in his preface to "Or Hadash," mentions him in terms of admiration.

Jacob Joshua was called from Metz to the rabbinate of Frankfurt (1741) chiefly through Kann's influence. The latter's sons Moses Kann and Bär Kann administered the charitable foundations which he had established during his life, in addition to his bequest of $10,000, from the interest of which students of the Torah were to be supported. In 1763 the sons turned over this fund in trust to the congregation, the semiannual interest, $275, to be distributed among beneficiaries proposed by the brothers Kann and approved by the board of the congregation.
