= Johann Christian Georg Bodenschatz =

German Protestant theologian

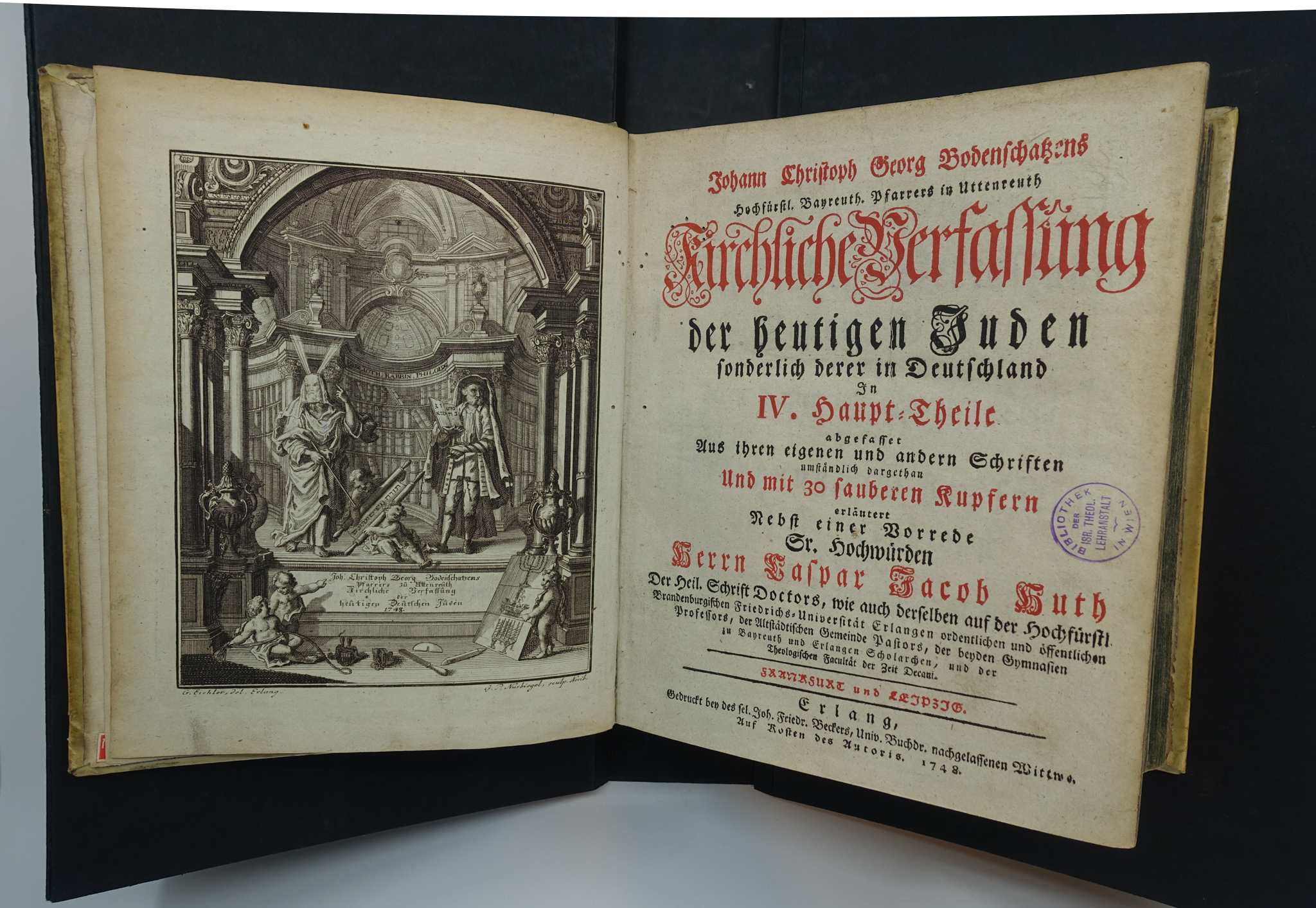
1748 edition of Kirchliche Verfassung der heutigen Juden, in the collection of the Jewish Museum of Switzerland.

Johann Christian Georg Bodenschatz (May 25, 1717 – October 4, 1797), was a German Protestant theologian.

== Biography ==
Bodenschatz was born at Hof, Germany. In his early education at the gymnasium of Gera he became interested in Oriental and Biblical subjects through his teacher, Schleusner; and later (1733), at the University of Jena, he took up Oriental languages as a special study.

Bodenschatz entered the Church, and was vicar of Uttenreuth, ultimately (1780) becoming superintendent at Baiersdorf. He devoted his life to Jewish antiquities, and is said to have made elaborate models of the Ark of Noah and of the Tabernacle in the wilderness. In 1748 he summarized the results of his researches in his Kirchliche Verfassung der Heutigen Juden, Sonderlich Derer in Deutschland (in four parts, Erlangen). This work gives, besides a short history of the Jews, which is derived mainly from Schudt and Basnage, a full account of Jewish ceremonial, drawn by the author from both written and oral sources and illustrated with engravings. Of these engravings some are imitated from Picart, but most of them were especially designed and engraved for the work; several have been reproduced in the Jewish Encyclopedia.

Bodenschatz generally gives an accurate account of Jewish ceremonial and custom; his work is consequently an original source for the actual practise of Jewish ceremonial in mid-Germany in the first half of the eighteenth century. A second edition appeared at Frankfort in 1756 under the title Aufrichtig Deutschredende Hebräer, oder Die Gebräuche und Ceremonien der Juden.

He died at Baiersdorf near Erlangen.
