= Shabbethai Horowitz =

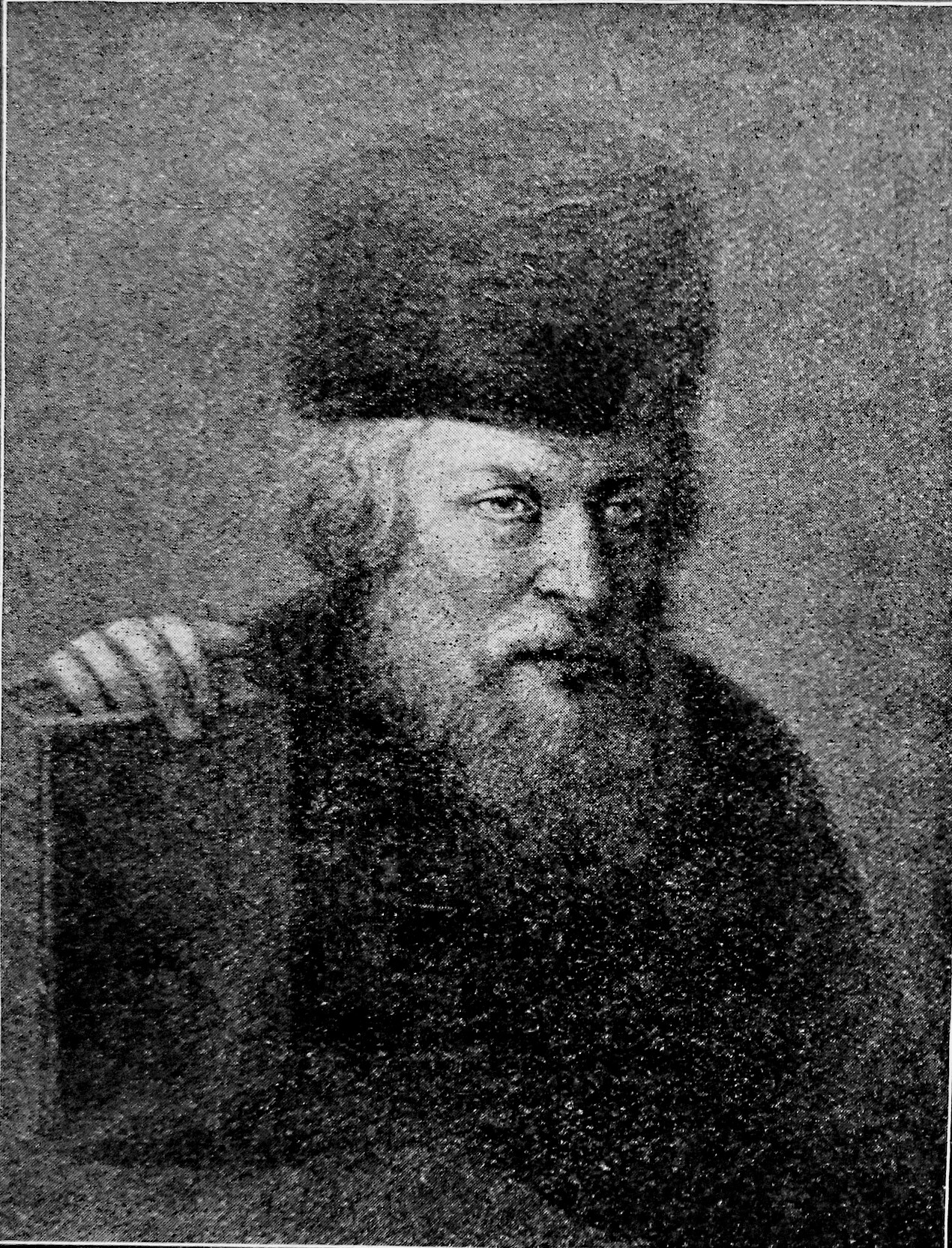
From the Jewish museum of Prague - Scheftel (Rabbi and talmudist of Prague). Painted by an unknown painter from the end of the 17th and the beginning of the 18th century. Photo of the year 1913.

Shabtai Horowitz (Hebrew: שבתי הורוויץ; c. 1590 – 12 April 1660) was a rabbi and talmudist, probably born in Ostroh, Volhynia. He was the son of the kabbalist Isaiah Horowitz, and at an early age married the daughter of the wealthy and scholarly Moses Charif of Lublin. With his father he seems to have gone to Prague, where he occupied a position as preacher; from Prague he went as rabbi to Fürth, whence he was called to Frankfurt am Main about 1632, and finally to Vienna about 1650.

Horowitz wrote additions to his grandfather Abraham's Emeḳ Berakah (which appeared first in the Amsterdam edition of 1729), additions to his father's prayer-book, and a treatise on religious ethics under the title Vave Ha-Ammudim. This work he modestly designated as an introduction to his father's celebrated work Shnei Luchot Ha-Brit (The Two Tablets of the Covenant), with which it is always printed as an appendix. He also wrote an ethical testament (Ẓawwa'ah, Frankfurt-on-the-Oder, n.d., often reprinted). It contains, besides some very charitable teachings, exhortations to strictness in ritual practise and in kabbalistic studies. Shabbethai further wrote some prayers (included in his father's prayer-book), especially a selichah for the 20th of Sivan.
