= Samuel Usque =

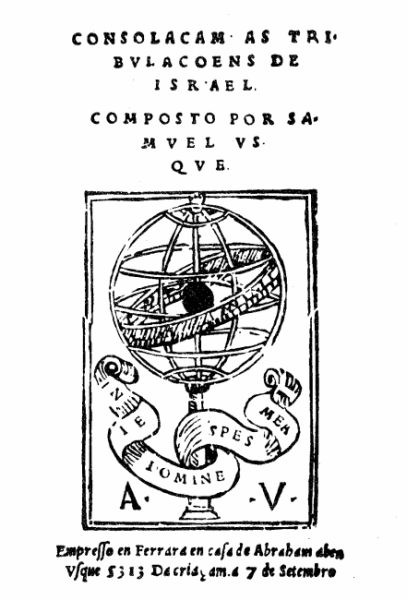
Consolação às Tribulações de Israel 1553

Samuel Usque (Lisbon, c.1500 - after 1555 in Italy or Ottoman Palestine) was a Portuguese converso Jewish author who settled in Ferrara. Usque was a trader.

His major work is the Consolação às Tribulações de Israel ("Consolation for the Tribulations of Israel"), Ferrara, 1553. He appears to be the only one of the contemporaries of Solomon ibn Verga to have made use of the latter's Scepter of Judah. Usque makes a connection between forcible conversion and the rise of Protestantism. His work depicts the Inquisition as a monster threatening Europe, indicating common cause between Portuguese Jews and the Netherlands. He bemoans the persecution and expulsion suffered by Jewish communities, and expresses his hope to reach the Holy Land.

He is credited with coining the epithet "Mother of Israel" (Judaeo-Spanish: Madre de Israel) for the Greek city of Thessaloniki.
