= Otto Stobbe =

German historian (1831–1887)

Johann Ernst Otto Stobbe (June 28, 1831 – May 19, 1887) was a German historian and law professor born in Königsberg.

He studied history, philology and jurisprudence at the University of Königsberg, earning his law degree in 1853. He continued his education in Leipsic and Göttingen, and in 1856 received his habilitation. Soon afterwards he became a professor of German law at Königsberg, later holding similar positions at the Universities of Breslau (from 1859) and Leipzig (from 1872).

== Written works ==
Stobbe was the author of several works in the fields of German law and legal history. In addition he is remembered for a scholarly work on Jews in Germany during the Middle Ages called Die Juden in Deutschland während des Mittelalters (1866). The following are a few of his better known publications:

- Zur Geschichte des deutschen Vertragsrechts (The history of German contract law, 1855)
- Geschichte der deutschen Rechtsquellen (History of German legal sources, 1860–64; two volumes)
- Beiträge zur Geschichte des deutschen Rechts (Contributions to the history of German justice, 1865)
- Die Juden in Deutschland während des Mittelalters in politischer, socialer und rechtlicher Beziehung (Jews in Germany during the Middle Ages in political, social and legal respects, 1866)
- Hermann Conring, der Begründer der deutschen Rechtsgeschichte (Hermann Conring, the founder of German legal history, 1870)
- Handbuch des deutschen Privatrechts (Textbook of German law, 1871; five volumes).
