= Judah ibn Verga =

Judah ibn Verga (Hebrew: יהודה אבן וירגה) was a Sefardic historian, kabbalist, perhaps also mathematician, and astronomer of the 15th century. He was born at Seville and was the uncle of Solomon ibn Verga, author of the Scepter of Judah. It is this work that furnishes some details of ibn Verga's life.

== Biography ==
He was held in high esteem by the governor of Andalusia. Once the Jews of Xerez de la Frontera, a small town near Seville, were accused of transferring the body of a converted Jew to their cemetery; they applied to Ibn Verga for help, who, when admitted to the presence of the governor, proved by means of a cabalistic writing that the real criminals were the priests (Shebeṭ Yehudah, § 38). He was very active in maintaining an understanding between the Marranos and the Jews; the Inquisition, on its introduction into Spain, desired him to betray the former. He succeeded, however, in escaping to Lisbon, where possibly he lived several years, until he was taken by the Inquisition; he died under torture (ib. § 62). Ibn Verga wrote a history of the persecutions of the Jews, largely taken from Profiat Duran's Zikron ha-Shemadot (comp. the synopsis in Grätz, Gesch. viii., note 1); his work, in turn, was the basis of the Shebeṭ Yehudah (see preface to the latter).

== Other works ==
The Bibliothèque Nationale, Paris (MS. No. 1005, Hebr.), contains a series of scientific treatises written by a certain Judah ibn Verga, who is generally identified with the Judah ibn Verga of the Shebeṭ Yehudah. These treatises are:

- Ḳiẓẓur ha-Mispar, a short manual of arithmetic (ib. folios 100-110a)
- Keli ha-Ofeḳi, a description of the astronomical instrument which he invented to determine the sun's meridian, written at Lisbon toward 1457 (folios 110b-118a)
- A method for determining heights (folios 118b-119b)
- A short treatise on astronomy, the result of his own observations, completed at Lisbon in 1457 (folios 120-127).
- Ibn Verga also wrote a commentary on Al-Farghani's compendium of the Almagest, about 1480 (Neubauer, "Cat. Bodl. Hebr. MSS." No. 2013, 4).

There is, however, some reason for the statement that this identification is doubtful (comp. Shebeṭ Yehudah, § 62). Another Judah ibn Verga lived in the 16th century and corresponded with Joseph Caro (Abḳat Rokel, Nos. 99, 100).

== Jewish Encyclopedia bibliography ==
- Grätz, Gesch. 3d ed., viii. 322;
- Steinschneider, Hebr. Uebers p. 557;
- Wiener's introduction to the Shebeṭ Yehudah.
