= Jacob Joshua Falk =

Polish rabbi (1680–1756)

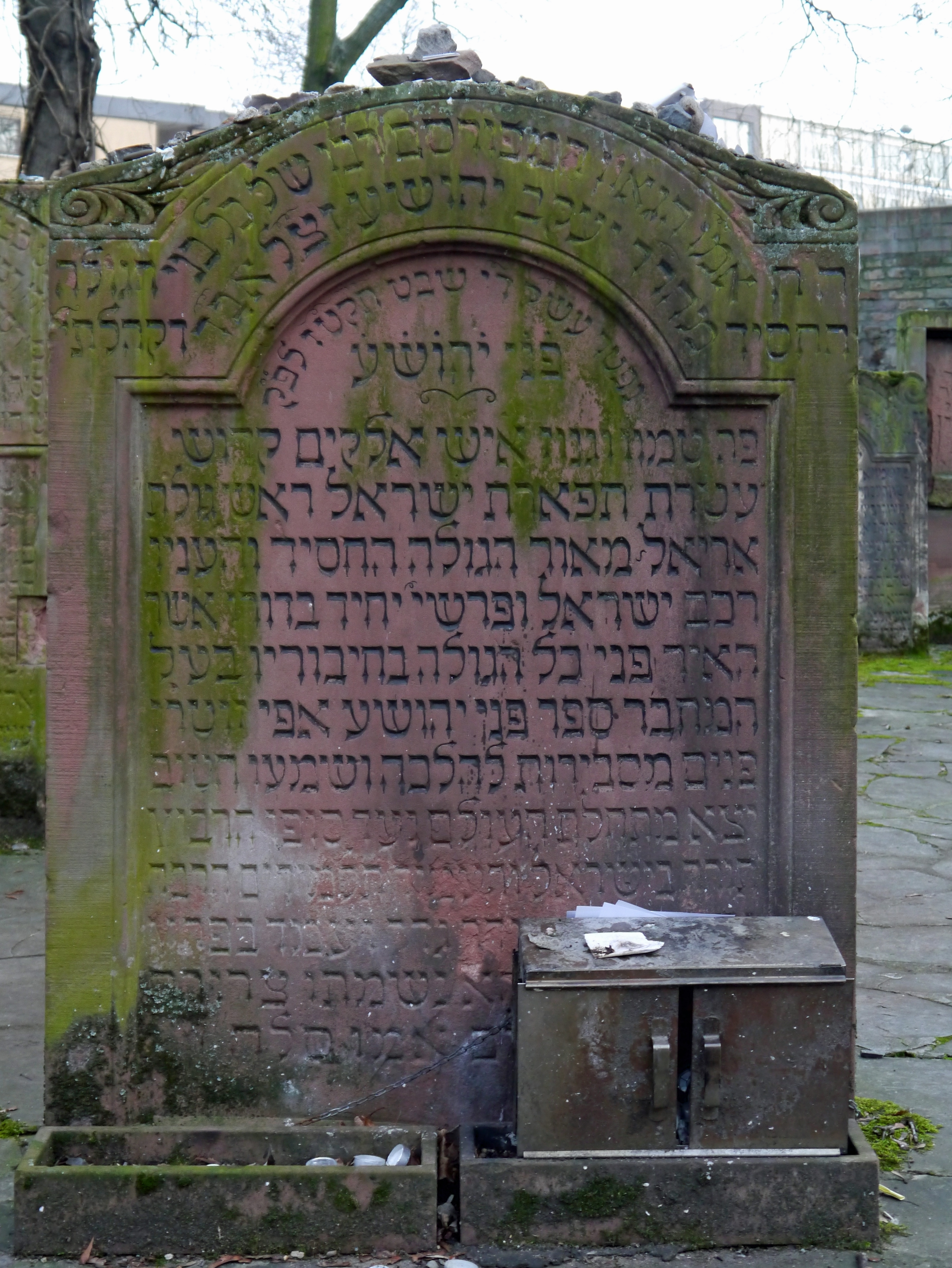
Tombstone of Jacob Joshua at the Jüdischer Friedhof Battonnstraße, Frankfurt am Main

Jacob Joshua (Hebrew: יעקב יהושע; also known as Yaakov Yehoshua ben Tzvi Hirsch, Yaakov Yehoshua, or the Pnei Yehoshua (Note: sometimes spelled Pene Yehoshua); 1680 – January 16, 1756) was a Polish and German rabbi and Talmudist.

== Name ==
Until the early 19th century, the names of most Central European Jews consisted of a Hebrew first name, a German second name, the patronymic "ben ... " (son of ...) and, if an upper one, the class - HaCohen (or "Katz") or HaLevy. The German name was chosen to fit the Hebrew one: thus "Zvi" or "Naftali" went with "Hirsch", and "Zev" or "Binjamin" with "Wolf". Those whose given name was Yehoshua, Josua, or Joshua had the second name of Falk, Valk, Walk, Wallik or Wallich. (One theory is that "Falk", here, derives from the German for falcon: just as a falcon circles its prey, so Joshua circled and explored the Holy Land before swooping down on it. Some derive "Valk" from an acronym of Leviticus 19:18: "ve'ahavta lere'akha kamokha" - "Love thy neighbor as thyself"). The name Falk was thus not a family name until the 19th century, when it was adopted by those whose immediate ancestors had "Falk" as a second name. Encyclopedias will therefore have several entries under "Falk", where "Falk", strictly, is not a surname. References to Rabbi Falk are therefore often via "Yehoshua Falk ben Alexander HaCohen" or "Joshua Falk ben Alexander Katz" or "Joshua Falk Katz".

== Biography ==
=== Early life ===
Falk was born in Kraków in 1680. On his mother's side he was a grandson of Rabbi Yehoshua Heschel (né Yosef of Cracow), the author of Maginne Shelomoh. While a youth he became examiner of the Hebrew teachers of Lemberg. In 1702 his first wife, Leah Landau (daughter of Solomon Segal Landau), his child, Guitel, and his mother were killed by an explosion of gunpowder that wrecked the house in which they lived. Falk himself narrowly escaped death, and was trapped in the debris of the explosion for hours. He vowed that if he got out alive, he would write a Sefer defending rashi from the questions of tosafos. He was saved, and thereafter wrote the Pnei Yehoshua. He married a second wife, Toba, with whom he had four sons and at least two daughters.

He was called to the rabbinate of Tarlow and Lisko, small towns in Galicia. In 1717 he replaced Rabbi Tzvi Ashkenazi in the chief rabbinate of Lemberg; he was called to Berlin in 1731.

Having displeased Veitel-Heine Ephraim, one of the most influential leaders of the community, by rendering a judgment against him, he was compelled to resign at the end of his term of office in 1734. After having been for seven years rabbi of Metz he became chief rabbi of Frankfort-am-Main; but the unfavorable attitude of the local authorities toward the Jews, and the fact that the community was divided by controversies, made his position there very precarious.

Soon afterward, a quarrel between Rabbis Yaakov Emden and Yonatan Eybeschütz broke out. Falk strongly opposed Eybeschütz, and was ultimately compelled to leave Frankfurt in 1750, due to the strong support Eybeschütz had there. He wandered from town to town until he came to Worms, where he remained for some years. He was recalled to Frankfurt, but his enemies prevented him from preaching in the synagogue, and he left the city a second time.

=== Death ===
Falk later relocated from Worms to Offenbach, where he died on the 14 Shevat in 1756. He was laid to rest in Frankfurt and, although he requested that no eulogy should be said after his death, he was eulogized by Ezekiel Landau.

== Author of Pnei Yehoshua ==
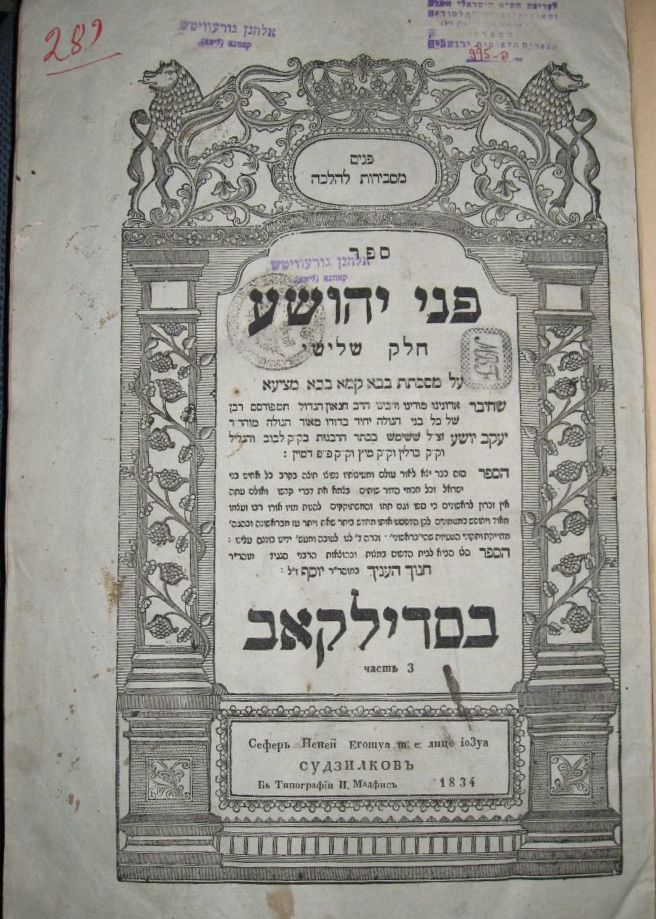
Title page of Pnei Yehoshua, printed in Sudlikov, 1834

Rabbi Yaakov Yehoshua was one of the greatest Talmudists of his time and his book of commentary and novellae on the Talmud, Pnei Yehoshua, is one of the classic works of the era of Acharonim. It remains an important book in the study of Talmud to this day.

He wrote Pnei Yehoshua in four parts. Two of them were published in Frankfurt am Main in 1752; the third, with his Pesak bet-Din Chadash, and fourth (which, in addition to Talmudic novellae, contains novellae on the Tur Choshen Mishpat and Likkutim) were published in Fürth in 1766 and 1780 respectively. Falk mentions writing a commentary on the Pentateuch, but it was never published.
