= Leopold Stein =

German rabbi (1810–1882)

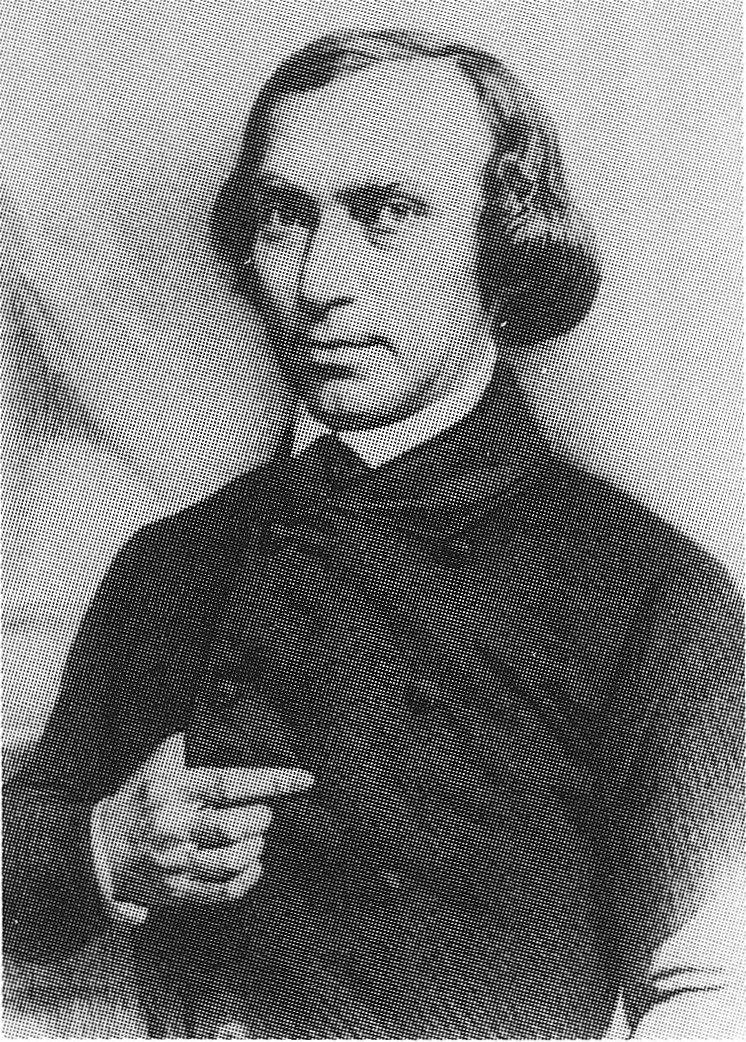

Personal life
- Born: 3 November 1810 Burgpreppach, Bavaria
- Died: 2 December 1882 (aged 72) Frankfurt, Prussia, German Empire
- Children: Sigmund Theodor Stein

Religious life
- Religion: Judaism

Leopold Stein (Yiddish: לעאפאלד שטיין; 3 November 1810 – 2 December 1882) was a German rabbi, theologian, and writer. He was a prominent leader of the Reform movement.

== Biography ==
Leopold Stein was born in Burgpreppach, Bavaria, on 3 November 1810. At the age of five he came to Adelsdorf, where his father was appointed rabbi.

After finishing his earlier education at Erlangen and Bayreuth, he began attending the University of Würzburg in 1830. He received his rabbinic ordination from the Talmudic College in Fürth, and in 1833 he delivered his first sermon in Frankfurt, in which he advocated for the introduction of reforms.

Two years later, Stein became rabbi of Burg- and Altenkunstadt in Franconia. He was rabbi at Frankfurt from 1844 to 1872, when he withdrew from public life. He presided over the rabbinical convention in Frankfurt in 1845.

== Work ==
Stein translated Biblical and medieval poetry into German and added German texts to traditional melodies of the Hebrew liturgy, which were often included in public services. He also published a number of secular poems and theatrical works.

With S. Süsskind, Stein was editor of Der Israelitische Volkslehrer ('The Israelite Folk Teacher', 1860–69), and edited the year-book Achawa, published by the teacher's association. He was a friend of Friedrich Rückert, to whose year-book he contributed several essays.

One of Stein's most popular writings was Die Schrift des Lebens ('The Scripture of Life'), an exposition of the dogmatics and ethics of Judaism.

=== Publications ===
- Stufengesänge. Würzburg. 1834. Poems.
- Gebete und Gesänge zum Gebrauche bei der Oeffentlichen Andacht [Prayers and Songs for Use in Public Worship]. Erlangen: F. Enke. 1840.
- Koheleth. Eine Auswahl gottesdienstlicher Vorträge [Kohelet: A Selection of Lectures on Religious Services]. Frankfurt: Johann David Sauerländer. 1846. hdl:2027/wu.89005129697.
- Die Rabbiner-Versammlung: ein Wort zur Verständigung [The Rabbinical Assembly: A Word of Understanding]. Frankfurt. 1846.
- Der Eid More Judaico [The Oath More Judaico]. Frankfurt. 1847. hdl:2027/uc1.$b123926.
- Lehre und Gebot [Doctrine and Commandment]. Frankfurt. 1858.
- Die Hasmonäer [The Hasmoneans]. Frankfurt. 1859. A drama in five acts.
- Gebetbuch für Israelitische Gemeinden: nach dem Ritus der Haupt-Synagoge zu Frankfurt-am-Main [Prayer book for Israelite communities: According to the rite of the main synagogue in Frankfurt-am-Main]. Frankfurt. 1860.
- Mein Dienstverhältniss zum Israelitischen Gemeindevorstande zu Frankfurt-am-Main, Actenmässig zur Begründung Meiner Amtsniederlegung Dargestellt [My employment relationship with the Israelite community board in Frankfurt-am-Main, presented in the documents to justify my resignation]. Frankfurt. 1861.
- Haus Ehrlich. Leipzig: Nies'sche Buchdruckerei. 1863. hdl:2027/hvd.hwmu4u. A drama in five acts (performed in Mannheim).
- Der Knabenraub von Karpentras [The Kidnapping of Karpentras]. Berlin. 1863. A drama in four acts.
- Sinai, die Worte des Ewigen Bundes [Sinai, the Words of the Everlasting Covenant]. Frankfurt. 1868. A didactic poem.
- Die Schrift des Lebens [The Scripture of Life]. Frankfurt. 1868.
- Torath-Chajim. Strasburg. 1877. On Jewish religious law.
- Der Geklärte Judenspiegel. 1882.
- Tag des Herrs. Song composed for the Reform ritual to be sung to the music of Kol Nidre on the eve of the Yom Kippur.
