= Schudt =

Schudt is a surname. Notable people with the surname include:

- Anna Schudt (born 1974), German actress
- Johann Jakob Schudt (1674-1722), German orientalist and polyhistor
