= Scepter of Judah =

Stories of Jewish persecution by Solomon Ibn Verga

The Scepter of Judah (Hebrew: Shevet Yehuda שבט יהודה) was a text produced by the Sephardi historian Solomon Ibn Verga. It first appeared in the Ottoman Empire in 1550. It contains some 75 stories of Jewish persecution, and is a transitional work between the medieval and modern periods of Jewish history. Born in Spain, Verga's views were shaped by the expulsion in 1492, his forced baptism, and the massacres as he fled Portugal. Shevet Yehudah was "the first Jewish work whose main concern was the struggle against ritual murder accusations." It was cited by his contemporary Samuel Usque, Consolação às Tribulações de Israel ("Consolation for the Tribulations of Israel"), Ferrara, 1553. Rebecca Rist has called it a satirical work that blends fiction with history. Jeremy Cohen has said Verga was a pragmatist who presented benevolent and enlightened characters with a happy ending.

The work was essentially a comprehensive analysis of sixty-four different persecutions that the Jewish people had suffered since antiquity. Hardly an insular text, it made use of Latin sources as well. It also had a certain anthropological value, as Ibn Verga discussed the customs and practices of Jews in various lands. Ibn Verga also sought to highlight criticisms of the Jews which are exaggerated for effect.

In many ways the Scepter of Judah was one of the first and most significant works of modern Jewish historiography. Ibn Verga sought to clarify the problem of anti-Jewish sentiment, which had manifested itself in the expulsion of the Jews from Spain in 1492. According to the author, the expulsion from Spain and Jewish exile in general were natural phenomena that were subject to historical forces of causation and explanation. They were not simply "punishment" for the sins of the Jewish people, as had been the time-honored way of explaining such misfortunes.

The text posited the view that the hatred of the Jews is a popular inheritance which is passed from generation to generation. It is occasioned by religious fanaticism (as had been the case in Spain) and is compounded by envy and jealousy; it also stems from a lack of education.

The Scepter of Judah was one of the most popular Jewish history books of all time, perhaps the most popular until the 19th century.

== See also ==
- Lachrymose conception of Jewish history
