= Arthur Eisenmenger =

German graphic designer (1914–2002)

Arthur Eisenmenger (born 20 October 1914 in Basel, died 19 February 2002 in Eislingen) was a German former chief graphic designer for the European Community.

CE Mark

Proportion requirements on the CE marking

Euro brand

Amongst his artistic creations are implementations of the European flag and the CE mark. He also claimed to have invented the euro sign (€) in 1973 or 1974, although official sources dispute that.
