= Johann Jakob Schudt =

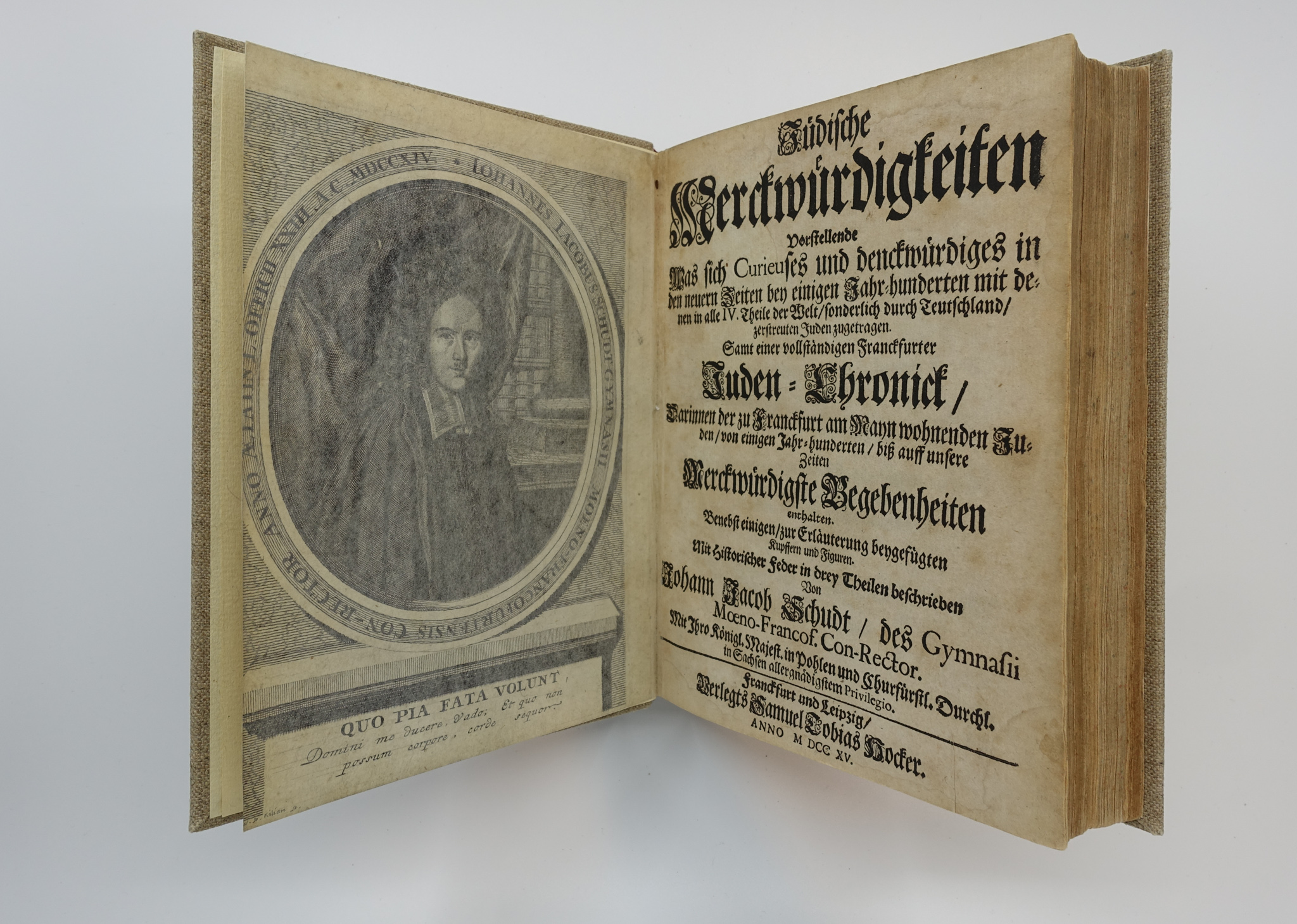
1715 edition of Jüdische Merckwürdigkeiten (volume 1), in the Jewish Museum of Switzerland’s collection.

Johann Jakob Schudt (January 14, 1664 – February 14, 1722) was a German polyhistor and Orientalist.

== Life ==
Schudt was born and died in Frankfurt am Main. He studied theology at Wittenberg, and went to Hamburg in 1684 to study Orientalia under Ezra Edzardi. He then settled in his native city as teacher in the gymnasium in which he had been educated, and of which he became rector in 1717.

== Works ==
He devoted himself especially to Jewish history and antiquities, beginning with the publication of a Compendium Historiæ Judaieæ (1700). His greatest work was his Jüdische Merckwürdigkeiten, of which three parts appeared in 1714, and a supplementary part in 1717.

Up to that time he had been on friendly terms with the Jews of Frankfurt, writing a preface to Grünhut's edition of David Ḳimḥi's Commentary on the Psalms, 1712, while in 1716 he published the Purim play of the Frankfurt and Prague Jews with a High German translation. He had, however, previously published Judæus Christicida, attempting to prove that Jews deserved corporal as well as spiritual punishment for the crucifixion.

His "Jüdische Merckwürdigkeiten" is full of prejudice, and repeats many of the fables and ridiculous items published by Johann Andreas Eisenmenger; but it contains also details of contemporary Jewish life, a source for the history of the Jews, particularly those of Frankfurt.

Schudt also contributed to Ugolini's "Thesaurus" (vol. xxxii.) a dissertation on the singers of the Temple.
