= Documenta III =

1964 art exhibition in Kassel, West Germany

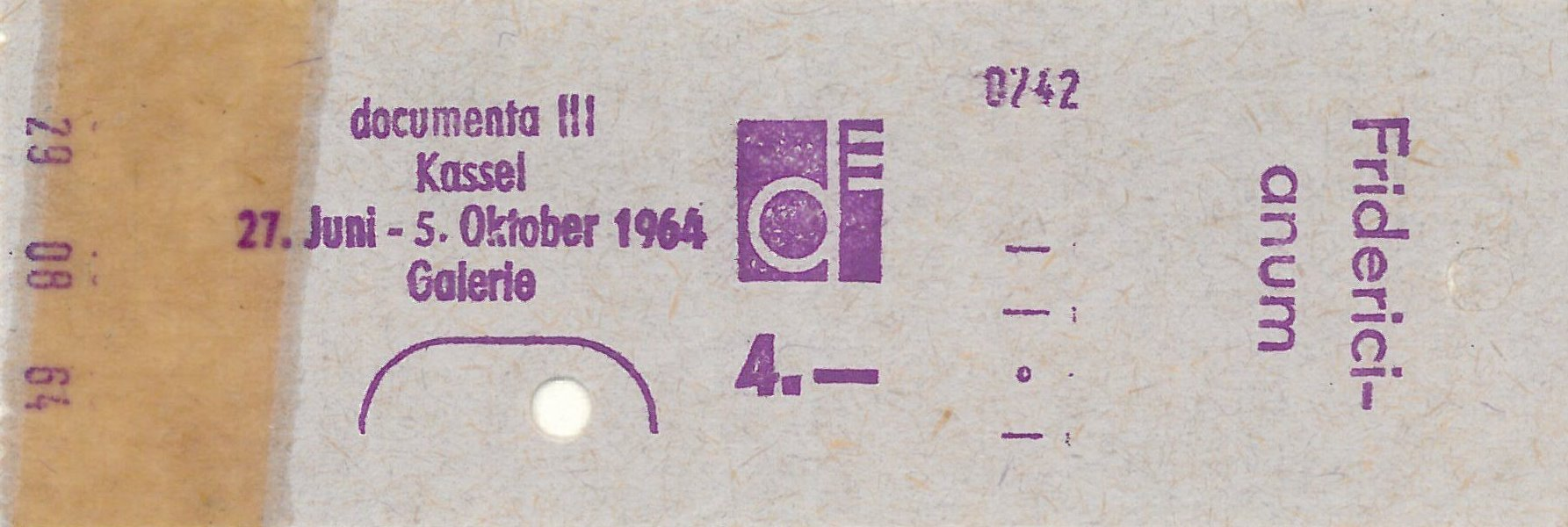
ticket documenta III: 29 August 1964

documenta III was the third edition of documenta, a quinquennial contemporary art exhibition. It was held between 27 June and 5 October 1964 in Kassel, West Germany. The artistic director was Arnold Bode in collaboration with Werner Haftmann. The title of the exhibition was: Internationale Ausstellung – international exhibition.

== Participants ==
A
Valerio Adami	Robert Adams	Hans Aeschbacher	Afro	Yaacov Agam
Pierre Alechinsky	Horst Antes	Karel Appel	Arman	Kenneth Armitage
Hans Arp	René Auberjonois	Joannis Avramidis	Kenjirō Azuma
B
Francis Bacon	Ernst Barlach	Saul Bass	Willi Baumeister	Herbert Bayer
Thomas Bayrle	Jean Bazaine	Max Beckmann	Hans Bellmer	Lucian Bernhard
Janez Bernik	Miguel Berrocal	Joseph Beuys	Max Bill	Julius Bissier
Roger Bissière	Karl Oskar Blase	Umberto Boccioni	Kay Bojesen	Pierre Bonnard
Lee Bontecou	Constantin Brâncuși	Georges Braque	Rodolphe Bresdin	Donald Brun
Peter Brüning	Klaus Burkhardt	Alberto Burri	Will Burtin	Pol Bury
C
Alexander Calder	Jean Carlu	Anthony Caro	Carlo Carrà	A. M. Cassandre
César	Paul Cézanne	Lynn Chadwick	Marc Chagall	Avinash Chandra
Eduardo Chillida	Giorgio de Chirico	Roman Cieślewicz	Emil Cimiotti	Antoni Clavé
Jean Cocteau	Bernard Cohen	Harold Cohen	Paul Colin	Pietro Consagra
Constant	Lovis Corinth	Corneille	Willem Hendrik Crouwel
D
Miodrag Djuric (Dado)	Radomir Damnjanović	Jean David	Alan Davie	Robyn Denny
André Derain	Charles Despiau	Otto Dix	Eugène Dodeigne	Piero Dorazio
Jean Dubuffet	Marcel Duchamp	Raoul Dufy	Dušan Džamonja
E
Charles Eames	Thomas Eckersley	Dick Elffers	Martin Engelman	Michael Engelmann
James Ensor	Hans Erni	Max Ernst
F
Joseph Fassbender	Gerson Fehrenbach	Lyonel Feininger	Lothar Fischer	Klaus Flesche
John Forrester	Sam Francis	Otto Freundlich
G
Horacio Garcia Rossi	Rupprecht Geiger	Vic Gentils	Nicholas Georgiadis	Karl Gerstner
Quinto Ghermandi	Alberto Giacometti	Werner Gilles	Hermann Goepfert	Roland Goeschl
Vincent van Gogh	Leon Golub	Julio González	Arshile Gorky	HAP Grieshaber
Franco Grignani	Juan Gris	George Grosz	Waldemar Grzimek	Hans Gugelot
Constantin Guys
H
Günter Haese	Étienne Hajdú	Otto Herbert Hajek	Hara Hiromu	Hans Hartung
Karl Hartung	Erich Hauser	Josef Hegenbarth	Bernhard Heiliger	Anton Heyboer
Hans Georg Hillmann	Jochen Hiltmann	George Him	Herbert Hirche	Paul Van Hoeydonck
Rudolf Hoflehner	Wolfgang Hollegha	Max Huber	Friedensreich Hundertwasser
I
Jean Ipoustéguy
J
Arne Jacobsen	Bernhard Jäger	Paul Jenkins	Alfred Jensen	Jasper Johns
Allen Jones	Asger Jorn
K
Kamekura Yūsaku	Wassily Kandinsky	Herbert W. Kapitzki	Edward McKnight Kauffer	Ellsworth Kelly
Zoltán Kemény	Walter Maria Kersting	Günther Kieser	Phillip King	Ernst Ludwig Kirchner
R. B. Kitaj	Paul Klee	Yves Klein	Gustav Klimt	Franz Kline
Aleksander Kobzdej	Hans Kock	Fritz Koenig	Oskar Kokoschka	Kōno Takashi
Willem de Kooning	Harry Kramer	Norbert Kricke	Klaus Kröger	Alfred Kubin
Rainer Küchenmeister
L
Wifredo Lam	André Lanskoy	Berto Lardera	Henri Laurens	Fernand Léger
Wilhelm Lehmbruck	Jan Lenica	Julio Le Parc	Herbert Leupin	Jan Lewitt
Richard Lin	Jacques Lipchitz	Jules Lismonde	El Lissitzky	Wilhelm Loth
Morris Louis	Lucebert	Bernhard Luginbühl
M
Heinz Mack	August Macke	James McGarrell	Aristide Maillol	Alfred Manessier
Franz Marc	Gerhard Marcks	Marino Marini	Albert Marquet	Étienne Martin
André Masson	Gregory Masurovsky	Henri Matisse	Roberto Matta	Almir Mavignier
Jean Messagier	James Metcalf	Hans Mettel	Otto Meyer-Amden	Matschinsky-Denninghoff
Henri Michaux	Hans Michel	Ludwig Mies van der Rohe	Josef Mikl	Joan Miró
Paula Modersohn-Becker	Amedeo Modigliani	Piet Mondrian	Pitt Moog	Henry Moore
Giorgio Morandi	François Morellet	Richard Mortensen	Robert Motherwell	Bruno Munari
Edvard Munch
N
Kazumasa Nagai	Jacques Nathan Garamond	Ernst Wilhelm Nay	Renee Nele	Rolf Nesch
Louise Nevelson	Ben Nicholson	Erik Nitsche	Marcello Nizzoli	Georges Noël
Isamu Noguchi	Emil Nolde	Eliot Noyes
O
Richard Oelze	Kenzo Okada	Christian d’Orgeix	Alfonso Ossorio
P
Eduardo Paolozzi	Jules Pascin	Victor Pasmore	Alicia Penalba	Constant Permeke
Celestino Piatti	Pablo Picasso	Otto Piene	Pierluca	Édouard Pignon
Giovanni Pintori	Filippo De Pisis	Serge Poliakoff	Jackson Pollock	Giò Pomodoro
Carl Pott	Concetto Pozzati	Heimrad Prem
R
Dieter Rams	Robert Rauschenberg	Odilon Redon	Josua Reichert	Bernard Réquichot
Germaine Richier	George Rickey	Gerrit Rietveld	Jean-Paul Riopelle	Günter Ferdinand Ris
Larry Rivers	Auguste Rodin	Giuseppe Romagnoni
S
Willem Sandberg	Giuseppe Santomaso	Antonio Saura	Raymond Savignac	Egon Schiele
Hans Schleger (Zéró)	Oskar Schlemmer	Joost Schmidt	Wolfgang Schmidt	Nicolas Schöffer
Paul Schuitema	Bernard Schultze	Emil Schumacher	Kurt Schwitters	Scipione (Gino Bonichi)
William Scott	Gustav Seitz	Jason Seley	Georges Seurat	Gino Severini
Ben Shahn	Paul Signac	Mario Sironi	David Smith	Francisco Sobrino
K.R.H. Sonderborg	Jesús Rafael Soto	Pierre Soulages	Chaïm Soutine	Jannis Spyropoulos
Toni Stadler	Nicolas de Staël	Anton Stankowski	Joël Stein	Hans Steinbrenner
Klaus Steinbrenner	Magnus Stephensen	Kumi Sugai	Richard Süßmuth	Marko Šuštaršič
Graham Sutherland	Waldemar Świerzy	Árpád Szenes	Rolf Szymanski
T
Jun Tabohashi	Shinkichi Tajiri	Ikkō Tanaka	Antoni Tàpies	Hervé Télémaque
Fred Thieler	Jean Tinguely	Mark Tobey	Henri de Toulouse-Lautrec	Harold Town
Otto Heinrich Treumann	Hann Trier	Heinz Trökes	Jan Tschichold
U
Günther Uecker	Hans Uhlmann	Reva Urban	Andreas Urteil
V
Suzanne Valadon	Italo Valenti	Victor Vasarely	Emilio Vedova	Bram van Velde
Maria Helena Vieira da Silva	Jacques Villon	Paul Voss	Édouard Vuillard
W
Wilhelm Wagenfeld	Hans Wegner	Hendrik Nicolaas Werkman	Brett Whiteley	Carl Heinz Wienert
Gerhard Wind	Fritz Winter	Tapio Wirkkala	Wols	Fritz Wotruba
Paul Wunderlich
Y
Ryūichi Yamashiro	Sori Yanagi	Yvaral
Z
Stanislaw Zagorski	Piet Zwart
