= Garmond =

Garmond may refer to:

- Warmund, Patriarch of Jerusalem (bef. 1069 – 1128)
- Garmond, Aberdeenshire, Scotland
- 10 pt size of metal type, named after Claude Garamond

== See also ==
- Garamond (disambiguation)
