= Hans Steinbrenner (sculptor) =

German painter and sculptor (1928–2008)

- Steinbrenner, c. 1999
- Born: Hans Theodor Steinbrenner; 25 March 1928; Frankfurt, Germany
- Died: 18 June 2008 (aged 80); Frankfurt, Germany
- Education: Städelschule; Münchener Kunstakademie
- Known for: Sculpture
- Awards: ars viva (1955)

Hans Theodor Steinbrenner (25 March 1928 – 18 June 2008) was a German painter and sculptor based in Frankfurt who focused on abstract figures in wood and stone. Many of his works are in public space.

== Life and career ==
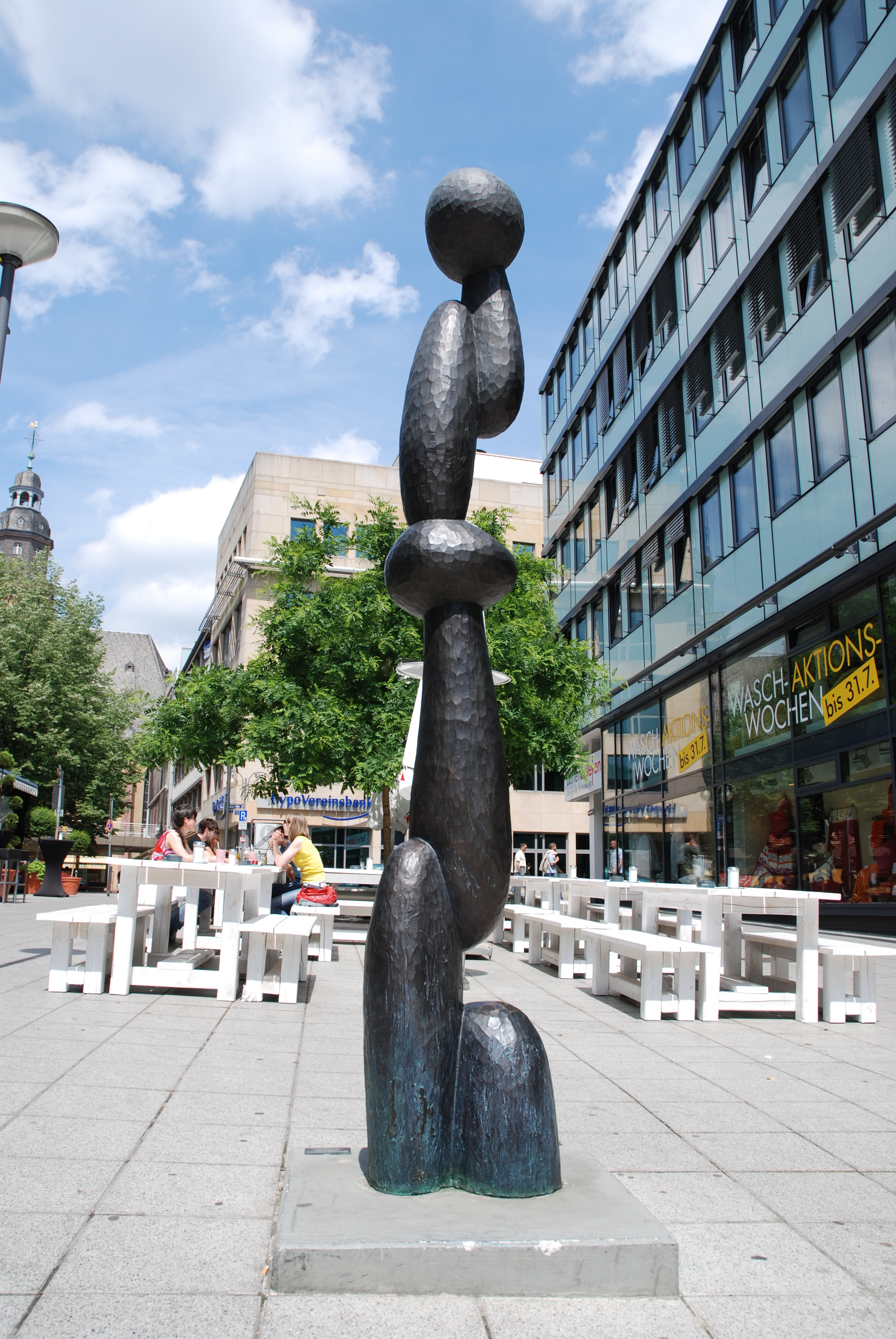
Figur (1961). Sandgasse, Frankfurt am Main

Steinbrenner was born in Frankfurt, Germany and grew up in the Frankfurt quarter Praunheim. After World War II, he studied at the Werkkunstschule in Offenbach am Main (now Hochschule für Gestaltung) from 1946 to 1949. He studied further at the Städelschule in Frankfurt until 1952, and then at the Münchener Kunstakademie with Toni Stadler until 1954. He worked from 1958 to 1963 together with his younger brother Klaus Steinbrenner as Hans & Klaus Steinbrenner in Frankfurt. He lived from 1964 until his death in the artists colony in Praunheim.

Since 1999, Steinbrenner was a member of the Bavarian Academy of Fine Arts.

Steinbrenner died in Frankfurt on 18 June 2008.

== Works ==
Steinbrenner's earliest works date to the late 1940s. Influenced by his teachers, they are classical single figures and groups. He was later inspired by the works of Constantin Brâncuși and Henri Laurens in Paris. In the mid-1950s, he created abstract high biomorph figures. In the 1960s, he turned to abstract geometric quader sculptures. From the late 1960s, he created high abstract figures, all called Figur. His main materials were shell limestone, wood and bronze.

Together with his brother, he had Große Holzfigur (Great wooden figure) exhibited at the 1964 documenta III in Kassel.

=== Sculpture garden ===
His widow, Anne, established a sculpture garden in Praunheim, opposite his former open-air work space, where his works from different periods are exhibited among old trees.

In 2023, celebrating his 95th birthday, his sculptures there were temporarily juxtaposed to works by friends, students and colleagues, sculptors Dietz Eilbacher, Dietrich Heller, Georg Hüter, Jens Trimpin and Thomas Vinson, and the Georgian painter Avto Berdznishvilis.

== Exhibition publications ==
- Steinbrenner, Hans (1976). Hans Steinbrenner : Holzskulpturen und Zeichnungen in der Galerie Loehr, Frankfurt a. Main, Altniederursel, vom 15. 9. – 31. 10. 1976 (in German). OCLC 164735766.
- ——; Gabler, Karlheinz; Galerie Ostertag (1978). Hans Steinbrenner, arbeiten von 1955–60 : Galerie Ostertag, Frankfurt am Main vom 22. Sept. – 15. Nov. 1978 (in German). Frankfurt am Main: Galerie Ostertag. OCLC 144615829.
- —— (1986). Hans Steinbrenner : Skulpturen 1982–1985 : 26.4.-11.6.1986, Galerie Katrin Rabus, Bremen (in German). Bremen: Die Galerie. OCLC 17168610.
- ——; Kunstverein Bremerhaven von 1886 (1983). Hans Steinbrenner Skulpturen, 1960 – 1982; 13.2. – 11.3.1983, Kunstverein Bremerhaven; 10.3. – 29.4.1984, Oberhessisches Museum und Gail'sche Sammlung Giessen (in German). Bremerhaven: Kunstverein [u.a.] OCLC 75223734.
- ——; Bojescul, Wilhelm; Kunstverein Braunschweig (1989). Hans Steinbrenner : Skulpturen : 14. Juni bis 30. Juli 1989, Kunstverein Braunschweig (in German). Braunschweig: Der Kunstverein. OCLC 22004456.
- —— (1988). Hans Steinbrenner (in French). Pontoise: Musée de Pontoise. ISBN 978-2-905199-19-5.
- ——; Neuer Berliner Kunstverein (1988). Hans Steinbrenner : Skulpturen (in German). [Berlin]: Neuer Berliner Kunstverein. OCLC 80163011.
- ——; Galerie Gudrun Spielvogel München (1997). Hans Steinbrenner – Bilder und Zeichnungen : 1965–1994; [Galerie Gudrun Spielvogel München, 1. März bis 30. April 1997; Galerie Katrin Rabus, Bremen, 19. April bis 20. Juni 1997; Galerie Dreiseitel, Köln 7. September bis 30. Oktober 1997] (in German). OCLC 312891607.
- ——; Galerie Schlichtenmaier (Stuttgart) (2012). Hans Steinbrenner : Skulpturen, Gemälde und Zeichnungen; Schloss Dätzingen; [Ausstellungsdauer: 30. September – 8. Dezember 2012] (in German). Grafenau: Galerie Schlichtenmaier. OCLC 888836711.
- ——; Kunst-Museum Ahlen (2014). Hans Steinbrenner : Skulptur, Grafik & Malerei (in German). Ahlen: Kunstmuseum Ahlen. OCLC 894846083.
- Dittmann, Lorenz (2016). Hans Steinbrenner. – [Begleittext Ausstellungskatalog] (in German). Heidelberg: arthistoricum.net. OCLC 1199741988.
- Dittmann, Lorenz (2017). Hans Steinbrenner und Otto Freundlich (in German). Heidelberg: arthistoricum.net. OCLC 1199701565.
- Dittmann, Lorenz (2017). Hans Steinbrenner Bronze-Plastiken 1961–1970. – [Einleitung zum Ausstellungskatalog] (in German). Heidelberg: arthistoricum.net. OCLC 1199765117.

== Awards ==
- 1955: ars viva

== Works in public space ==
Several of Steinbrenner's works are in public space, including in Bochum, Bottrop, Bremen, Gießen, Heidelberg, Kaiserslautern and Marl. The majority of those are in the Rhein-Main Region, including Frankfurt, Bad Homburg and Wiesbaden.

Figur (1993) is part of the sculpture garden of the Städel, which owns two more of his sculptures, and the Bronze Figur (1961) is located in the Sandgasse. A wooden Schrift-Stele from 1968 is part of the Grüneburgpark, one figure is part of the Hessischer Rundfunk property, and another was installed on Detmolder Platz in 2019, while a 1979 fountain is on Merianplatz.

== Gallery ==
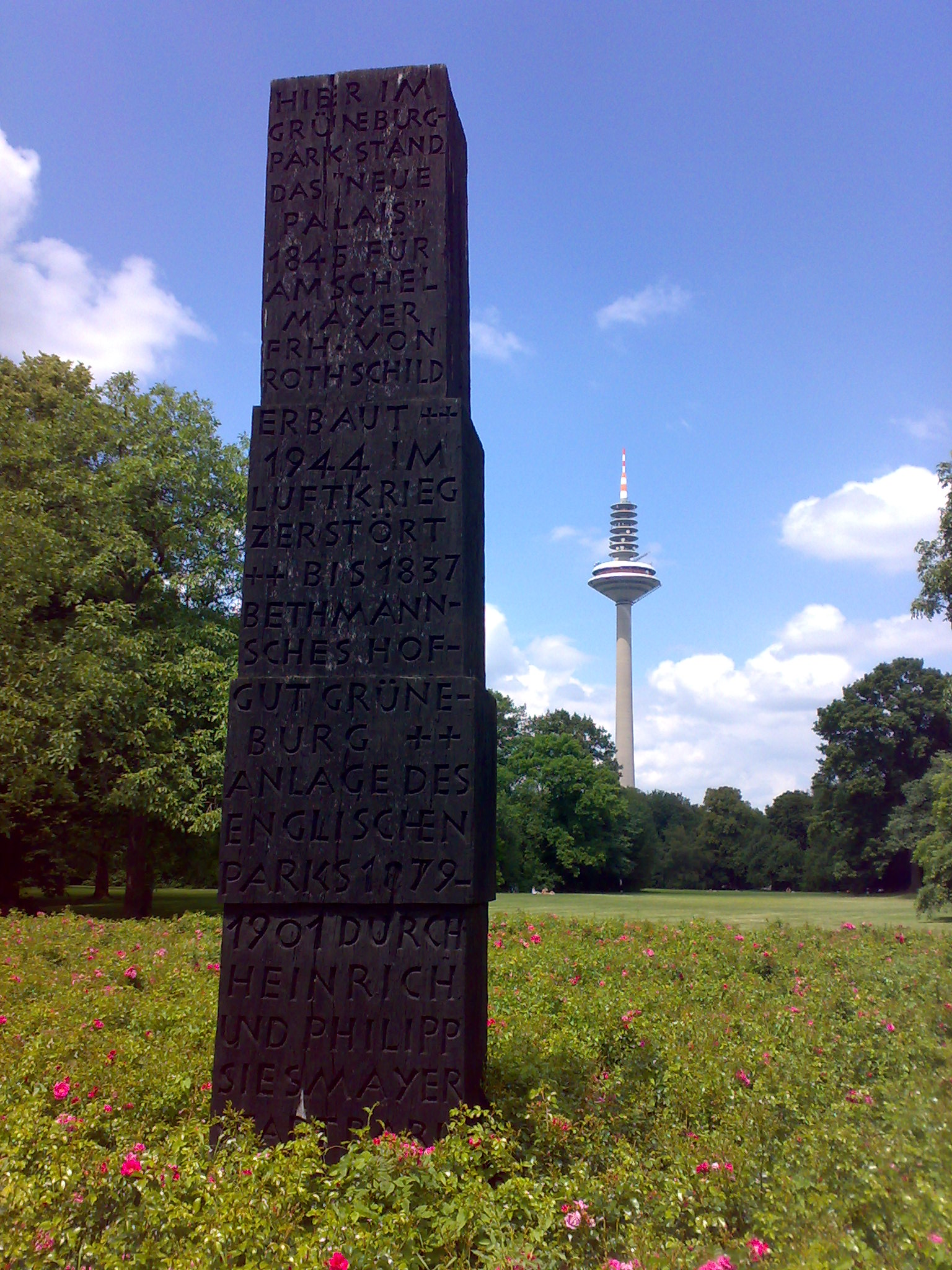
Schrift-Stele (1968), Grüneburgpark

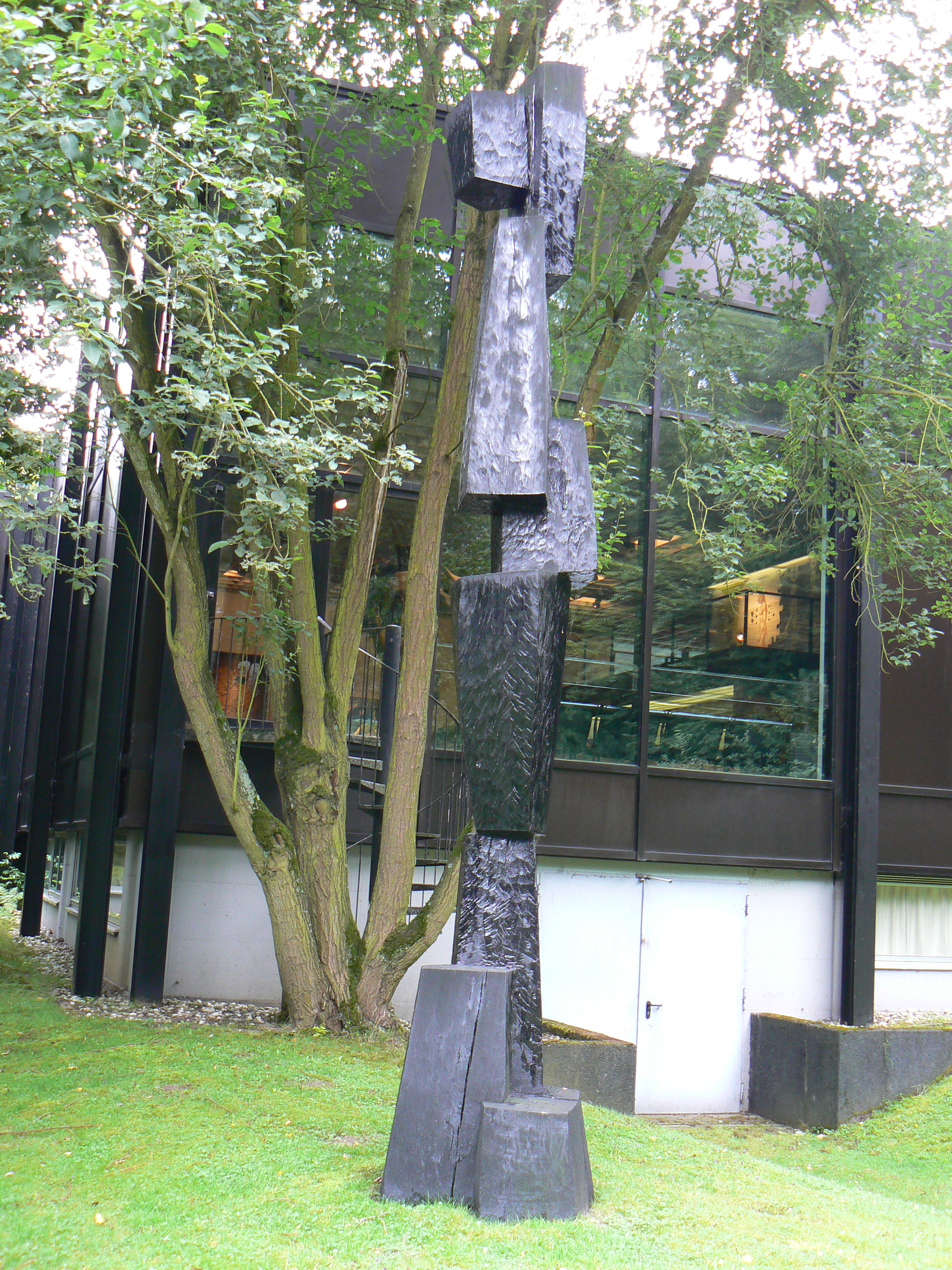
Figur (1961/1981), Quadrat Bottrop

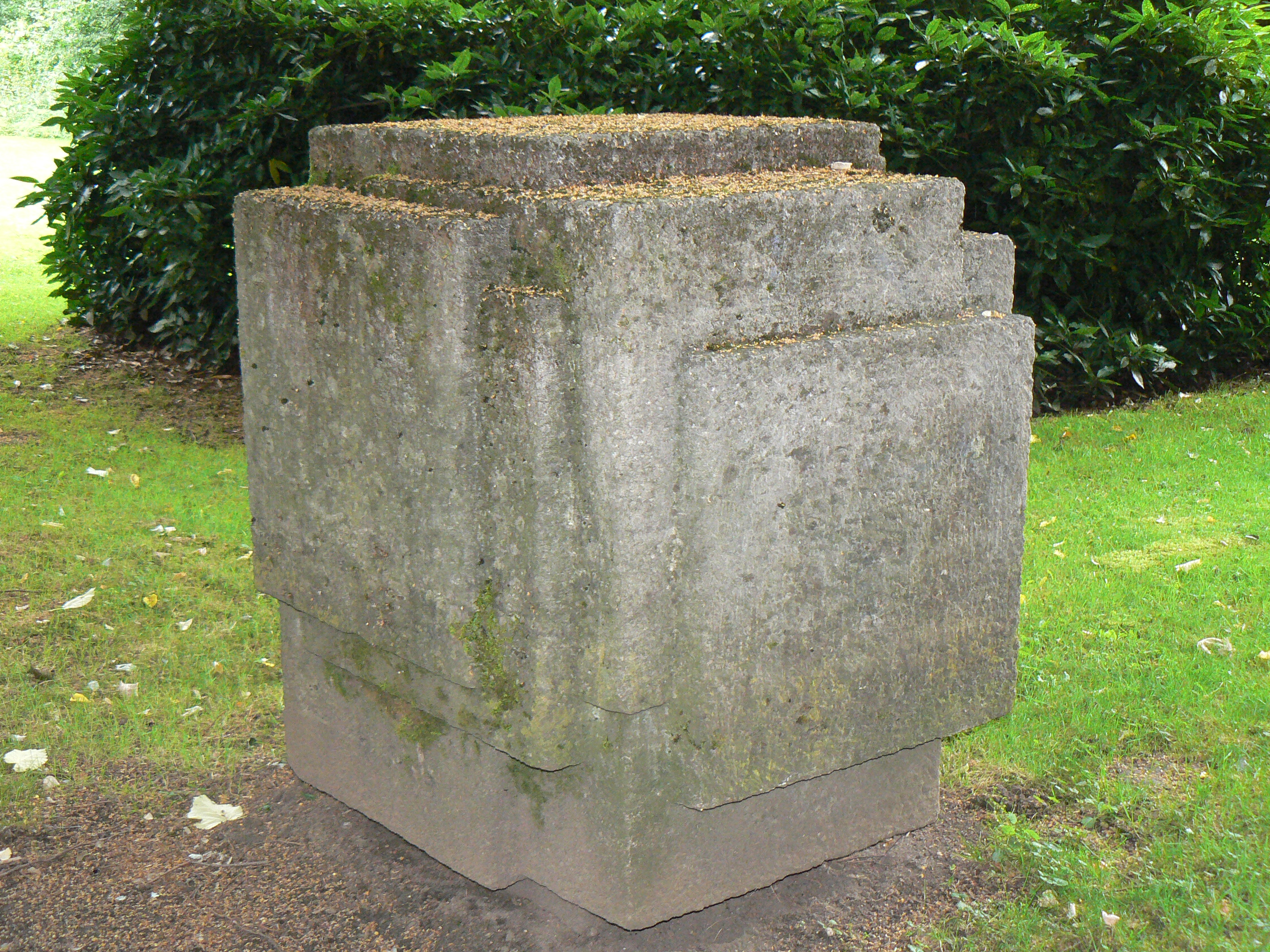
Quader-Skulptur (1965), Quadrat Bottrop

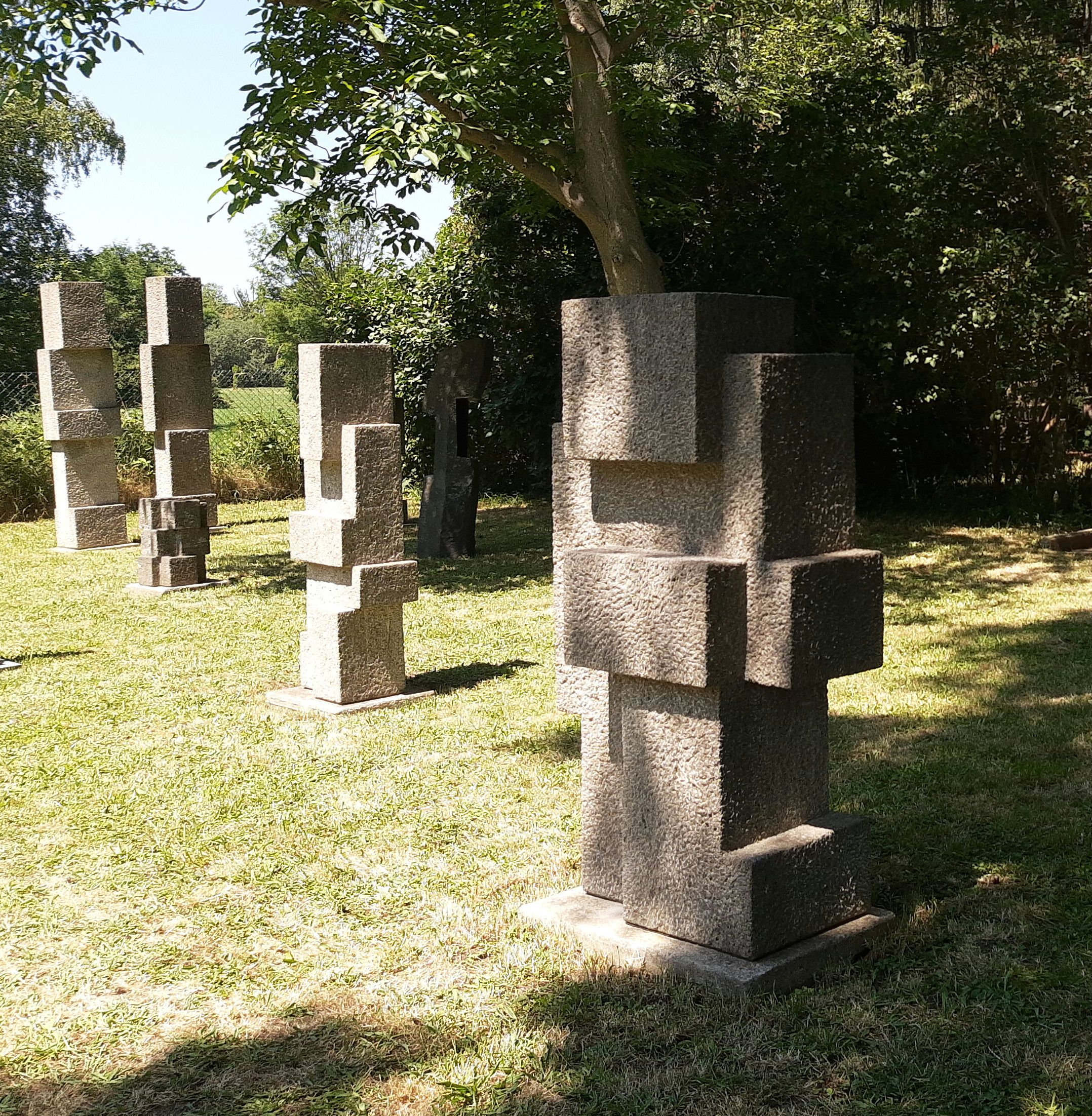
Praunheim sculpture garden
