= Garamond (disambiguation) =

Garamond is a group of many serif typefaces.

Garamond may also refer to:

- Garamond (font size), or Garmond, a traditional point-size name

== People ==
- Claude Garamond or Garamont (c. 1510–61) French type designer, for whom the typefaces are named
- Jacques Nathan Garamond (1910–2001), French graphic artist

== Fictional characters ==
- Saul Garamond, in King Rat (Miéville novel)
- King Garamond II, in Valhalla and the Fortress of Eve
- Garamond Ray, in The Strange Adventures of Rangergirl
- Futura Garamond, in So Yesterday (novel)

== See also ==
- Garmond (disambiguation)
