= Garmond, Aberdeenshire =

Coordinates: 57°33′42″N 2°19′36″W

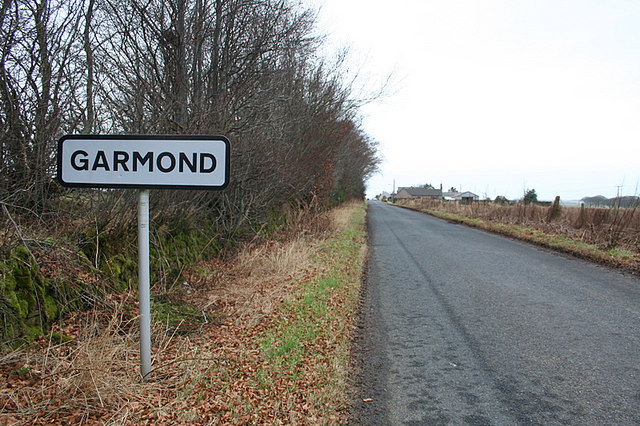

Garmond (Scottish Gaelic: Garbh Mhon(adh)) is a linear village in Monquhitter Parish which is located in Aberdeenshire, Scotland. It was founded c.1760. Like the neighbouring villages of Cuminestown and New Byth, the residential part is located on the crest of a hill, the valley below being largely given over to farmland.

"The Garmond" is 1 mile North of Cuminestown and 7 miles East of Turriff.
