= Senckenberg Nature Research Society =

German scholarly society

- Abbreviation: SGN
- Formation: 22 November 1817; 208 years ago
- Location: Frankfurt, Germany
- Website: https://www.senckenberg.de/en/

The Senckenberg Nature Research Society (German: Senckenberg Gesellschaft für Naturforschung, until 2008 Senckenbergische Naturforschende Gesellschaft) is a German scholarly society with headquarters in Frankfurt am Main.

== Overview ==
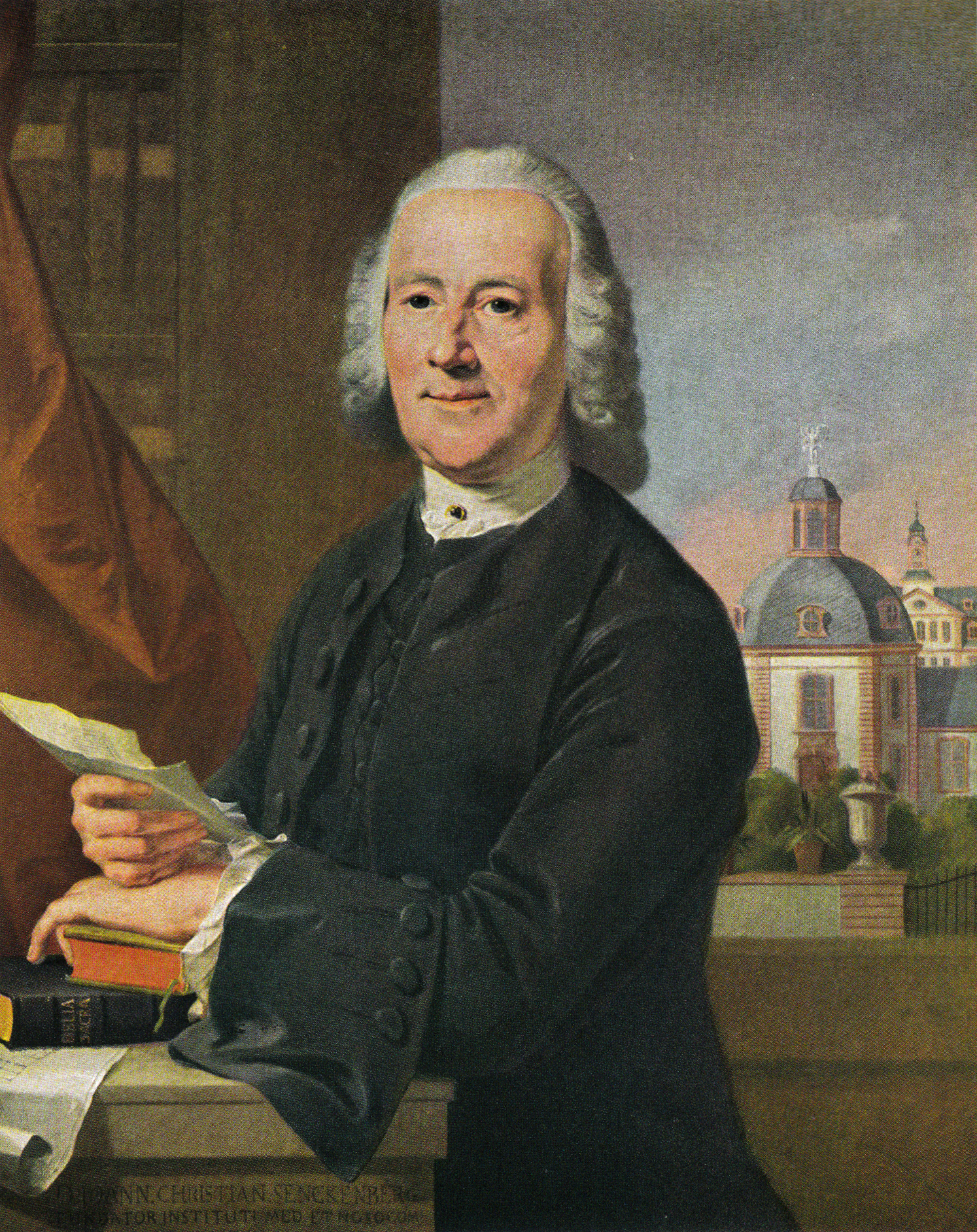
Johann Christian Senckenberg

Its purpose is to conduct research in the natural sciences and make the results of nature research available to the public. The society was founded by Frankfurt citizens on 22 November 1817 on the initiative of Johann Wolfgang von Goethe, and is named for the physician, naturalist, botanist and philanthropist Johann Christian Senckenberg (1707-1772).

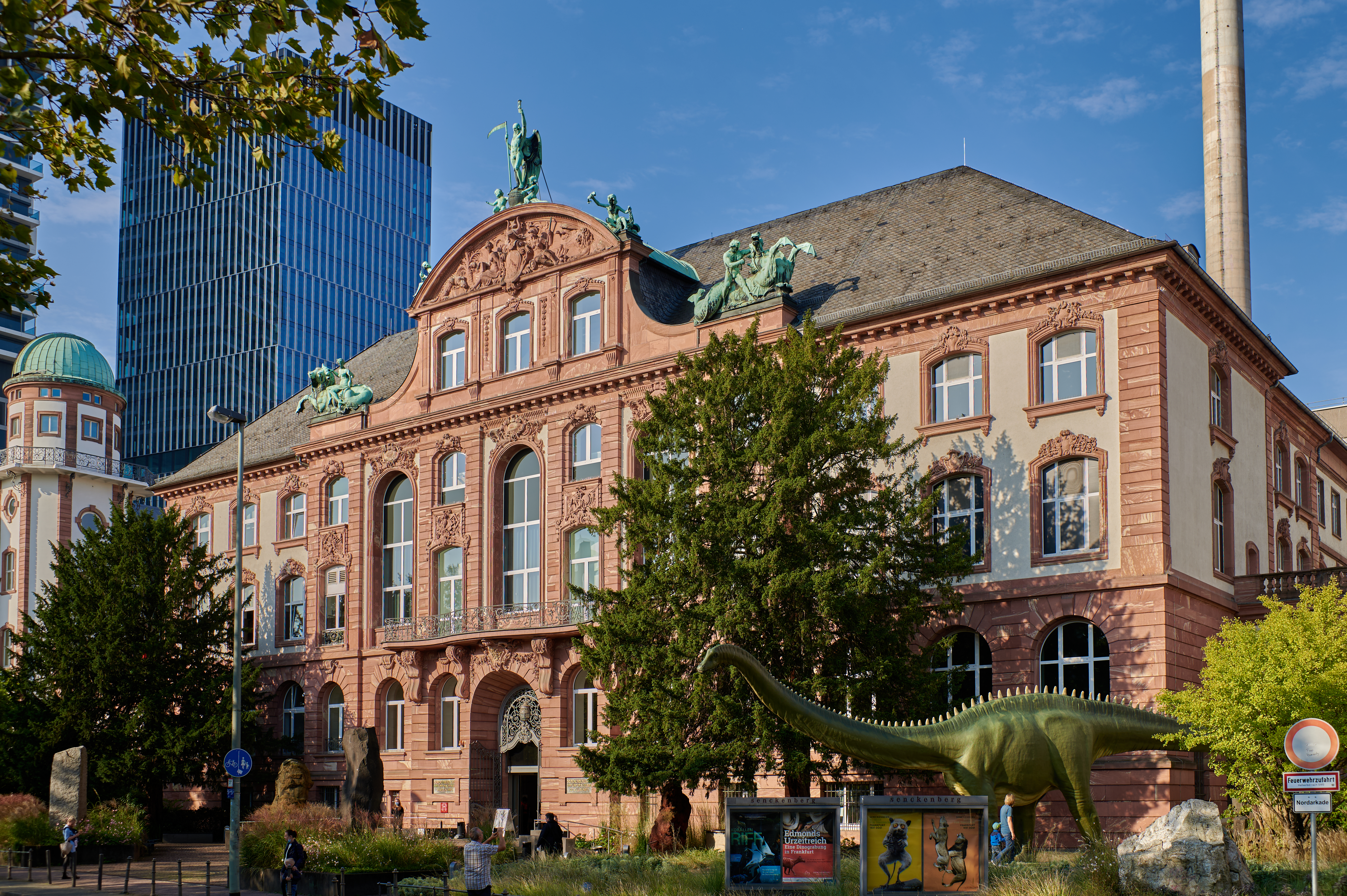
Naturmuseum Senckenberg

It shares the Senckenberg name with the Dr. Senckenberg Foundation (Dr. Senckenbergische Stiftung), founded by Senckenberg in 1763, but is a separate organisation. The Senckenberg Nature Research Society owns several research institutes and museums, such as the Naturmuseum Senckenberg and the Naturkundemuseum Görlitz.

== See also ==
- Archiv für Molluskenkunde, one of its academic journals
