= List of listed buildings in Monquhitter, Aberdeenshire =

This is a list of listed buildings in the parish of Monquhitter in Aberdeenshire, Scotland.

== List ==
Name	Location	Date Listed	Grid Ref. (Note: Sometimes known as OSGB36, the grid reference (where provided) is based on the British national grid reference system used by the Ordnance Survey. • "Guide to National Grid". Ordnance Survey. • "Get-a-map". Ordnance Survey.)	Geo-coordinates	Notes	LB Number (Note: Historic Environment Scotland assign a unique alphanumeric identifier to each designated site in Scotland, for listed buildings this always begins with "LB", for example "LB12345".)	Image
Monquhitter Churchyard				57°32′40″N 2°19′50″W	Category C(S)	16106	Upload Photo
Old Hall Buildings, Garmond				57°33′34″N 2°19′29″W	Category C(S)	19777	Upload Photo
Auchry House, Lodge				57°32′48″N 2°20′27″W	Category B	16111	Upload Photo
Manse Of Monquhitter, Cuminestown Including Garden Walls				57°32′38″N 2°20′02″W	Category B	16107	Upload Photo
Millfield House				57°33′33″N 2°18′54″W	Category B	16108	Upload Photo
Everton Of Auchry, Farmhouse				57°33′25″N 2°20′28″W	Category C(S)	16112	Upload Photo
Monquhitter Parish Church, Cuminestown				57°32′40″N 2°19′54″W	Category B	16122	Upload Photo
Monument To William Cumine (Gulielmi Coming') Of Auchry Monquhitter Churchyard				57°32′39″N 2°19′57″W	Category B	16123	Upload Photo
Balthangie Cottage				57°32′55″N 2°16′05″W	Category C(S)	16109	Upload Photo
Auchry House, Dovecot				57°33′01″N 2°19′47″W	Category B	16110	Upload Photo

== Key ==
The scheme for classifying buildings in Scotland is:

- Category A: "buildings of national or international importance, either architectural or historic; or fine, little-altered examples of some particular period, style or building type."
- Category B: "buildings of regional or more than local importance; or major examples of some particular period, style or building type, which may have been altered."
- Category C: "buildings of local importance; lesser examples of any period, style, or building type, as originally constructed or moderately altered; and simple traditional buildings which group well with other listed buildings."

In March 2016 there were 47,288 listed buildings in Scotland. Of these, 8% were Category A, and 50% were Category B, with the remaining 42% being Category C.

== See also ==
- List of listed buildings in Aberdeenshire
