= Cuminestown =

Coordinates: 57.5397°N 2.3317°W

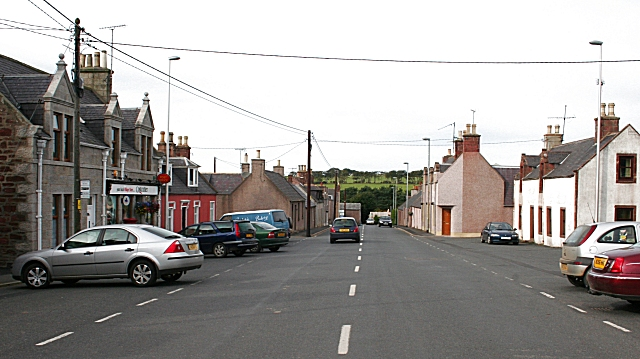
- The square and the main street in Cuminestown

- Location within Aberdeenshire
- Population: 560 (2020)
- OS grid reference: NJ802502
- Council area: Aberdeenshire
- Lieutenancy area: Aberdeenshire
- Country: Scotland
- Sovereign state: United Kingdom
- Postcode district: AB53
- Dialling code: 01888
- Police: Scotland
- Fire: Scottish
- Ambulance: Scottish
- UK Parliament: Gordon and Buchan
- Scottish Parliament: Aberdeenshire East

Cuminestown (Scots pronunciation: [ˈkʌmɪnstən]) is a village in the Formartine area of Aberdeenshire, Scotland, and sits at the centre of the parish of Monquhitter. It is approximately 6 miles from Turriff and New Deer, 10 miles from Macduff and Banff and 15 miles from Fraserburgh.

Monquhitter is a small rural parish nestling in the heart of Aberdeenshire. It incorporates the small village of Garmond and many houses and farms in the surrounding areas including Greeness and Greens. The parish was split from Turriff in 1649 when what was then a rural church was built on land owned by the Cumine family. The village itself was founded in 1763 by Joseph Cumine, to a design by Sir Archibald Grant of Monymusk, a friend of Cumine's. Grant's plan for the village followed closely the design used for firstly New Keith, and secondly Archiestown. The construction of the village was followed soon afterwards by the adjacent hamlet of Garmond.

The postcode of Cuminestown is within the Turriff and District ward/electoral division, which is in the UK Parliamentary Constituency of Gordon and Buchan. The Scottish Parliament constituency is Aberdeenshire East.

The village primary school, called Monquhitter School, also serves Garmond and New Byth.

The Parish Church of Montquhitter was built in 1764, on a bluff behind the town. It was extended by James Matthews in 1868. It contains a 17th-century stone, from an earlier church, and a bell of 1689.

A 1707 monument to William Cumine has "excellent carving and three curious, almost Romanesque panels framing a fine flying skeleton". Cumine's house, Auchry, built in 1767, was a tall, red ashlar mansion featuring carvings from Auchry Castle.

The large, now-replaced House of Byth was built to 1693. It is survived only by 19th-century doocot and home farm.

In 2011, Cuminestown had an estimated population of 440. It is currently estimated to have a population of 540

== See also ==
- List of listed buildings in Monquhitter, Aberdeenshire

== Bibliography ==
- McKean, Charles (1990), Banff & Buchan, Royal Incorporation of Architects in Scotland, ISBN 978-1-85158-231-0
