= Johann Christian Senckenberg =

German doctor and naturalist

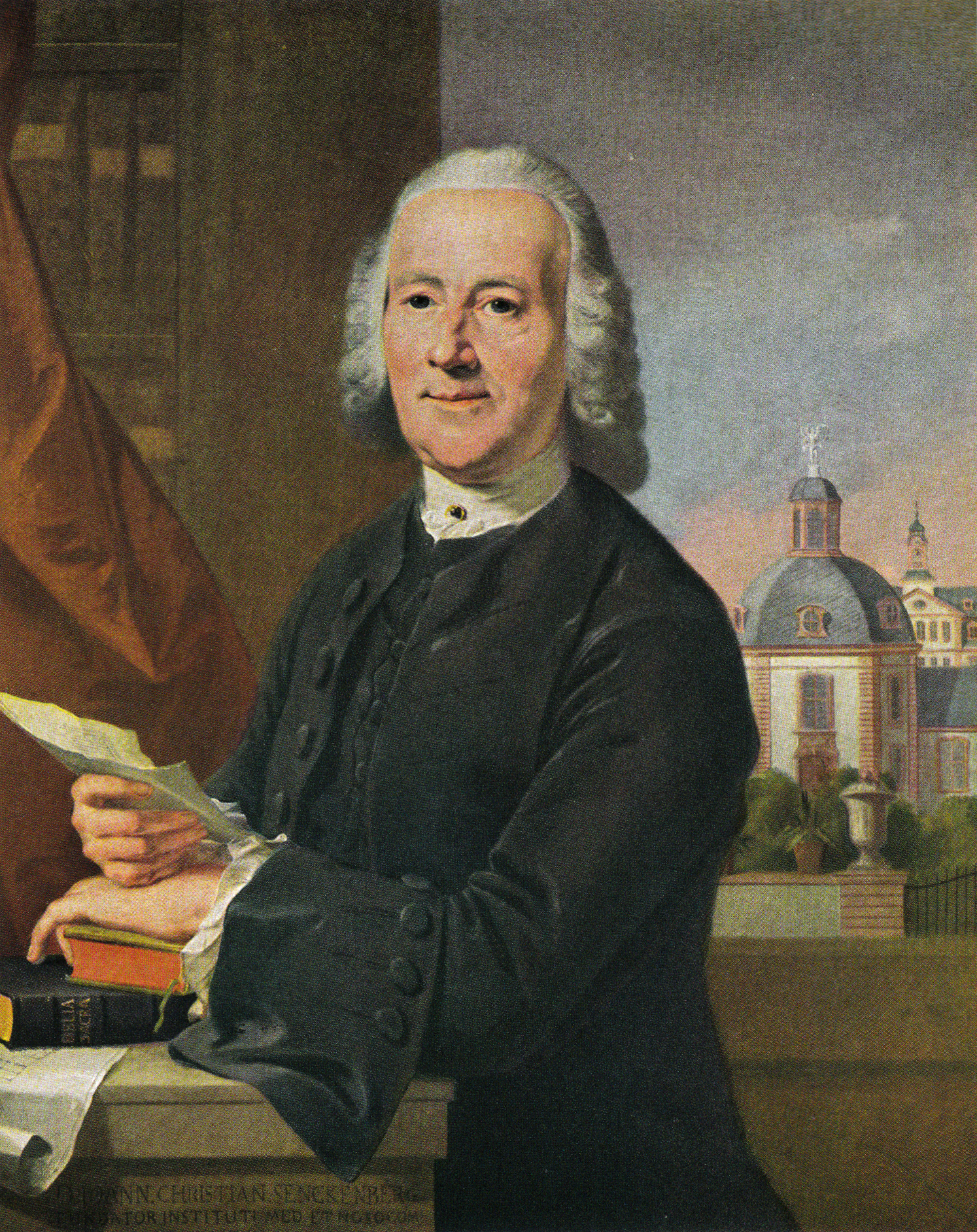
Senckenberg in front of Theatrum anatomicum und das Bürgerhospital, Frankfurt. Painting by Anton Wilhelm Tischbein

Johann Christian Senckenberg (28 February 1707 – 15 November 1772) was a German physician, naturalist and collector. In 1763, he established the Senckenberg Foundation to support natural sciences. This founded the Botanischer Garten der Johann Wolfgang Goethe-Universitat Frankfurt am Main. His name is honoured in the Senckenberg Gesellschaft für Naturforschung (Senckenberg Natural History Society) which he endowed, Frankfurt University Library, and Naturmuseum Senckenberg.

== Career ==
Senckenberg was born on 28 February 1707 in Frankfurt am Main. He was the second oldest son of the Frankfurt city physicus (Physikus primarius, medical officer) Johann Hartmann Senckenberg (1655-1730) and his second wife Anna Margaretha born Raumburger (1682-1740). He attended the municipal school in the former Franciscan mendicant in 1719. When Senckenberg was twelve years old, Senckenberg House was burned down in the Großer Christenbrand, which was the worst fire disaster in Frankfurt until the Second World War. The reconstruction of the house brought the family into financial difficulties. Although Senckenberg was granted a 100 guilders scholarship through the city four years later, his studies were delayed due to the financial situation.

In the meantime, Senckenberg worked as an intern lead doctor (Leitarzt) with the Solms noble family and with Frankfurt doctors Büttner and Grambs. His father instructed him in practical medicine. In 1730 he was able to study medicine at the University of Halle. His teachers in Halle included Friedrich Hoffmann and Georg Ernst Stahl. In July 1731 he had to stop studying in Halle. The deeply religious Senckenberg was impressed by the theologian Johann Konrad Dippel and became involved in theological arguments and refused Eucharist. He had turned away from the state church and was in contact with pietists, inspirational communities and members of the Moravian Church (Herrnhutern). In Halle, he encountered the charitable institutions of August Hermann Francke, including an orphanage and a hospital.

Senckenberg returned to Frankfurt in the spring of 1732 and practised medicine there without a license. After he had suffered from mental problems, his older brother Heinrich Christian Senckenberg helped him in 1737 to obtain his doctorate at the Georg August University of Göttingen. Under the chairmanship of Albrecht von Haller, he dealt in his dissertation with the healing power of the Lily of the valley (De lilii convallium eiusque inprimis Baccae viribus.: "On the healing power of the berries of the Lily of the valley"). In the following years, Senckenberg became involved as "Physicus extraordinarius", from 1755 as "Physicus ordinarius" for the health service in Frankfurt.

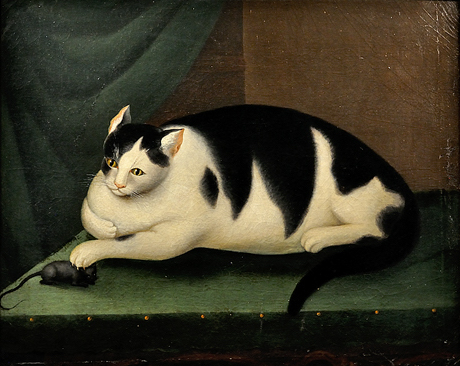
Oil painting of Senckenberg's cat (1752)

After the death of his mother in 1740, Senckenberg married the jeweller's daughter (Joh-)Anna Rebecca Riese in 1742. In the same year he resigned the Bürgerid. The two had been neighbours as children and had known each other ever since. On 26 October 1743, Riese died of childbed fever following the birth of their daughter. The daughter Anna Margarethe Senckenberg died in 1745 from meningitis. Senckenberg remarried in 1744. His second wife, Katharina Rebecca von Mettingh, had been a friend of Senckenberg's first wife. She died in 1747, as did a son that was born in June 1747 of tuberculosis. In 1752, Senckenberg had a portrait painted of his cat. In 1754, Senckenberg married a third time. However, the marriage with Antonetta Elisabetha Ruprecht was not good, and from 1756 they lived separately. Ruprecht suffered from cancer. Senckenberg also treated her after the separation, but she died in late 1756.

After the death of his three wives and his children, he decided to make his entire fortune available in a Foundation pro bono publico patriae. Senckenberg called the reason for the Foundation the "lack of marital heirs" and his love "for my fatherland". The purpose of the Foundation should be the "better health care of local residents and the care of the poor." The endowment of 95,000 guilders came partly the legacy of Anna Rebecca, and partly from the fortune he had earned as a doctor.

Senckenberg stated that a "Collegium medicum" comprising Frankfurt Protestant physicians were the heirs of the Foundation's assets, and that four city doctors were to be testament executors. Two-thirds of the interest on the Foundation's capital was to be used to promote medicine, although initially it was to be used for the entertainment of the Senckenbergische Wohnhaus, which was equipped with a library and a collection. The remaining third should be used to care for needy doctors and patients. In 1765, Senckenberg increased the Foundation assets to 100,000 guilders. He strongly limited the board of trustees and gave his older brother and his descendants a say in the Foundation's administration. The Foundation became called Senckenbergische Stiftung and took as seal the coat of arms of the Senckenberg family: a burning bush.

Senckenberg already had plans to build a building on the outskirts with garden, laboratory, botanical garden and greenhouse. In 1766, Senckenberg acquired a three-hectare plot of land at Eschenheimer Tor for 23,000 guilders. From 1767 the building became the foundation seat and residential building of Senckenberg. On 9 July 1771, Senckenberg laid the foundation stone for the Frankfurt Bürgerhospital. During an inspection of the building on 15 November 1772, Senckenberg crashed down from the scaffolding of the dome of the hospital and died. On 17 November, he was publicly dissected in the "Theatrum anatomicum" donated by him, even though he had refused a dissection in the will. The cause of death was a cervical spine fracture with ascending bleeding in the spinal canal. Senckenberg's nephew, Renatus Karl von Senckenberg, noted in a report on Senckenberg; "All of Frankfurt regretted his loss". On 18 November 1772, Frankfurt surgeons accompanied by Renatus of the Senckenberg Foundation, as well as administration and other mourners, carried the coffin to the Senckenberg tomb at Stiftsgebäude monastery.

Senckenberg kept diaries during his studies. A total of 53 diary volumes and 600 folders with further notes are now in the Frankfurt University Johann Christian Senckenberg Library. There are 40,000 pages in total. Due to the hard-to-read handwriting (a mixture of Frankfurt German, Latin, Greek, French and English), as well as numerous idiosyncratic abbreviations, reading and transcribing these diaries is very difficult. Since 2011, Frankfurt University Library has been working on bringing some 13,000 diary pages from the years 1730 to 1742 into a readable form and making them available online as digital copies.
