= Aleksander Kobzdej =

Polish painter

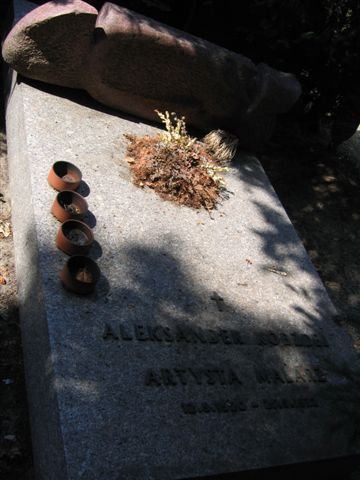
Aleksander Kobzdej's monument (Powązki Cemetery; Cmentarz Komunalny, d. Wojskowy)

Aleksander Kobzdej (1920–1972) was a Polish painter. He was born in, what was then, Ukraine. Kobzdej is best known for being one of the most prominent representatives of the Polish Social Realist group, and for being the creator of unique Polish versions of "matter" painting.

Kobzdej began studying architecture in 1939 at Lviv. He finished his degree in Gdansk Polytechnic Institute and later studied under Wladyslaw Lam at the Kraków Academy of Fine Arts.

Kobzdej started off as a Post-Impressionist. His works eventually became more abstract. Toward the end of the 1940s, he exhibited bits of European Realism. This led him to Socialist Realism in the early later 1940s. Beginning in 1950 he was an active participant in official arts reviews, including the annual Polish National Visual Arts Exhibitions organized in Warsaw by the Ministry of Culture and Art. Here he presented his most famous painting to date "Pass me a Brick." Slowly though Kobdzej began to stray away from Socialist Realist iconography and he moved toward exotic depictions and more narrative pieces, mainly influenced by his travels to Vietnam and China.
