= Palmengarten =

Botanical garden in Germany

- Palmengarten
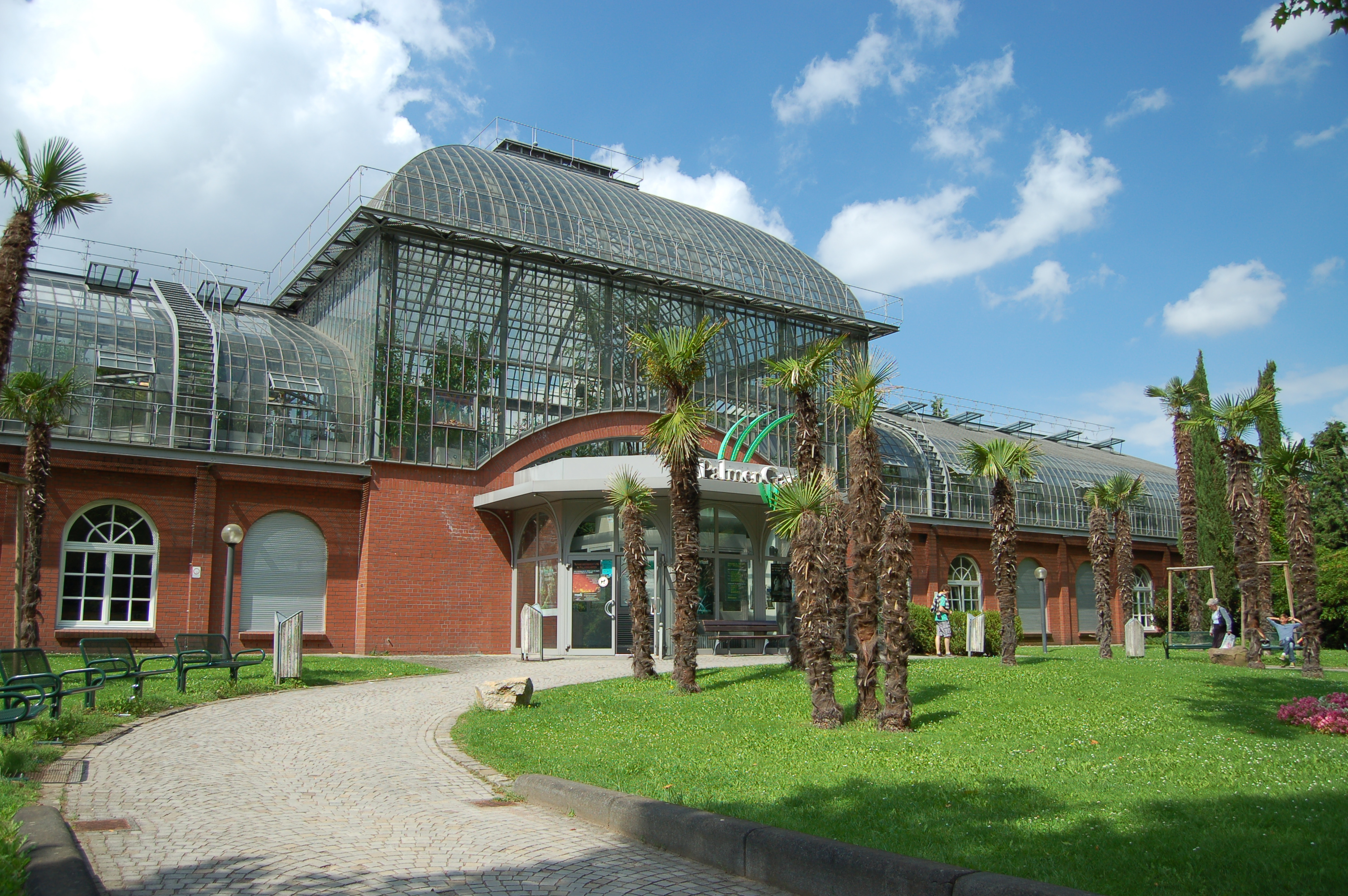
- Main entrance at Siesmayerstraße

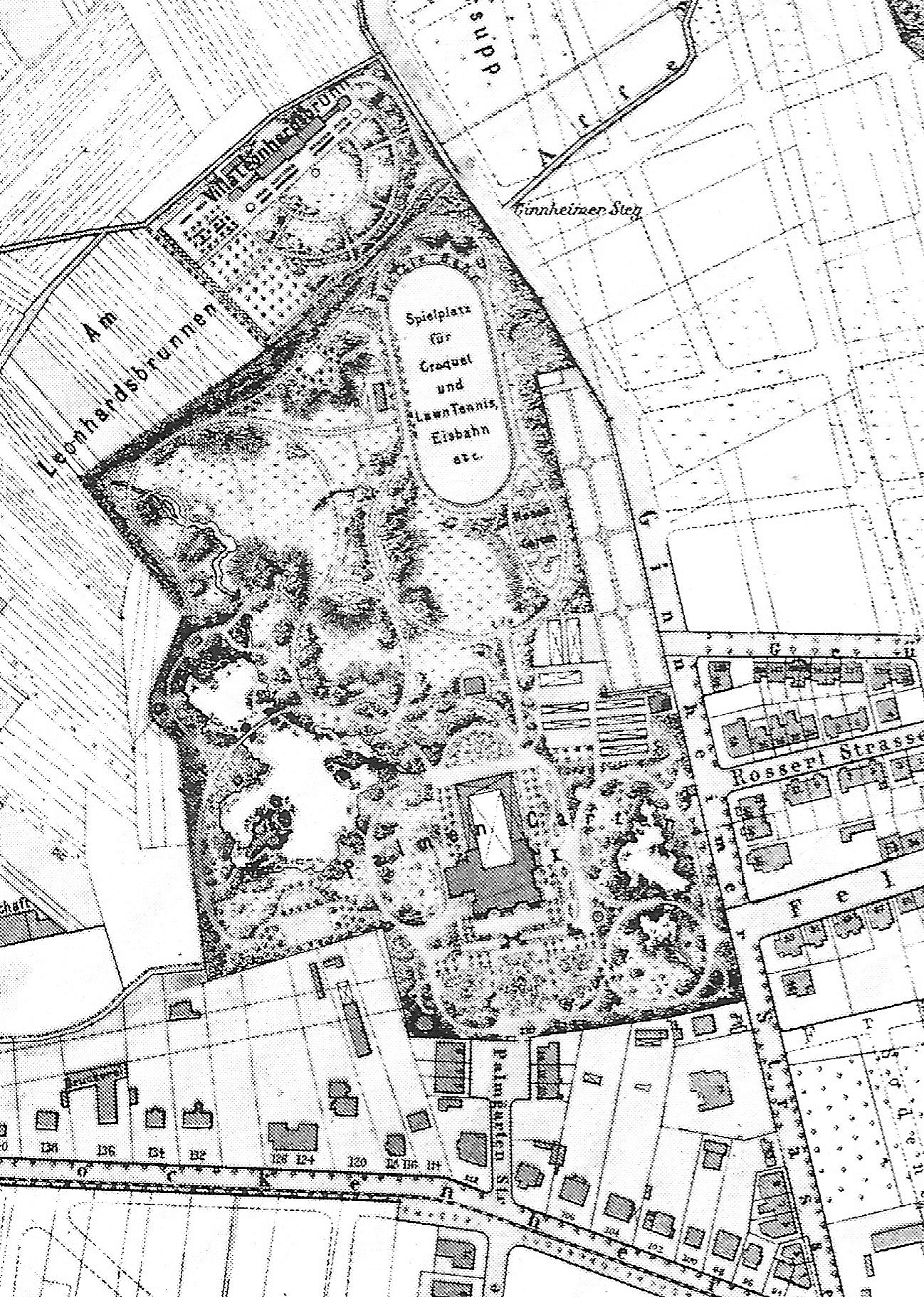
- Detail of a town map created in 1887
- Type: Botanical garden
- Location: Frankfurt, Hesse, Germany
- Coordinates: 50°7′25″N 8°39′20″E
- Area: 22 ha (54 acres)
- Opened: 16 March 1871
- Founder: Siesmayers Actiengesellschaft
- Designer: Heinrich Siesmayer
- Etymology: German word for "palm garden"
- Owner: Frankfurt
- Visitors: 596,934 (in 2015)
- Open: February–October: 9 am–6 pm November–January: 9 am–4 pm
- Status: open
- Parking: underground car park
- Public transit: Bockenheimer Warte; Westend; 16 Bockenheimer Warte; 36, 50, 75 Palmengartenstraße, 75 Siesmayerstraße, 32, 36, 50, N1 Bockenheimer Warte
- Website: www.palmengarten.de/en/gardens/palmengarten.html

The Palmengarten is one of two botanical gardens in Frankfurt am Main, Germany. It is located in the Westend-Süd district. It covers a surface of 22 hectares (54 acres). It is a major tourist attraction.

== History ==
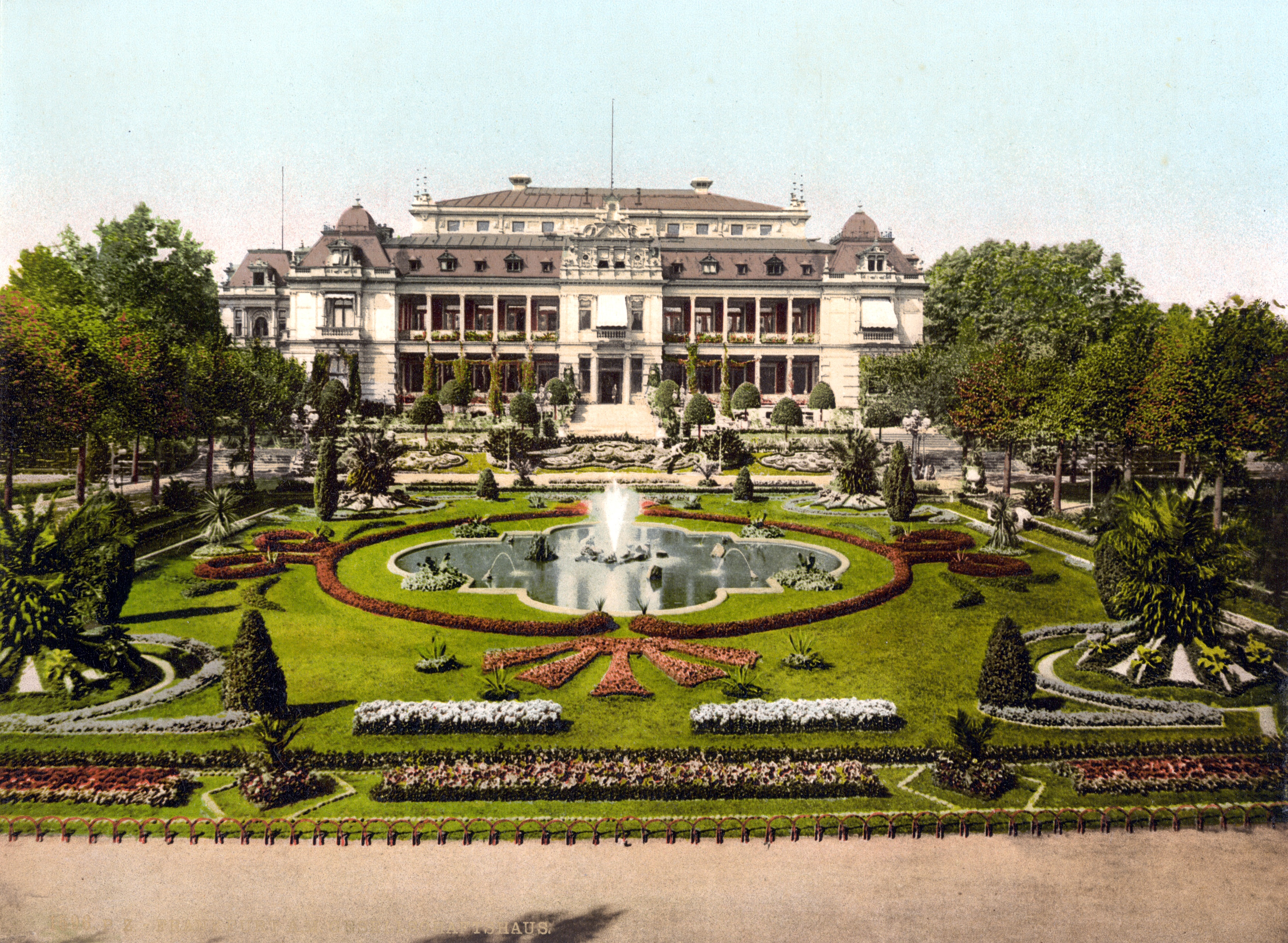
Frankfurt Palm Garden c. 1890

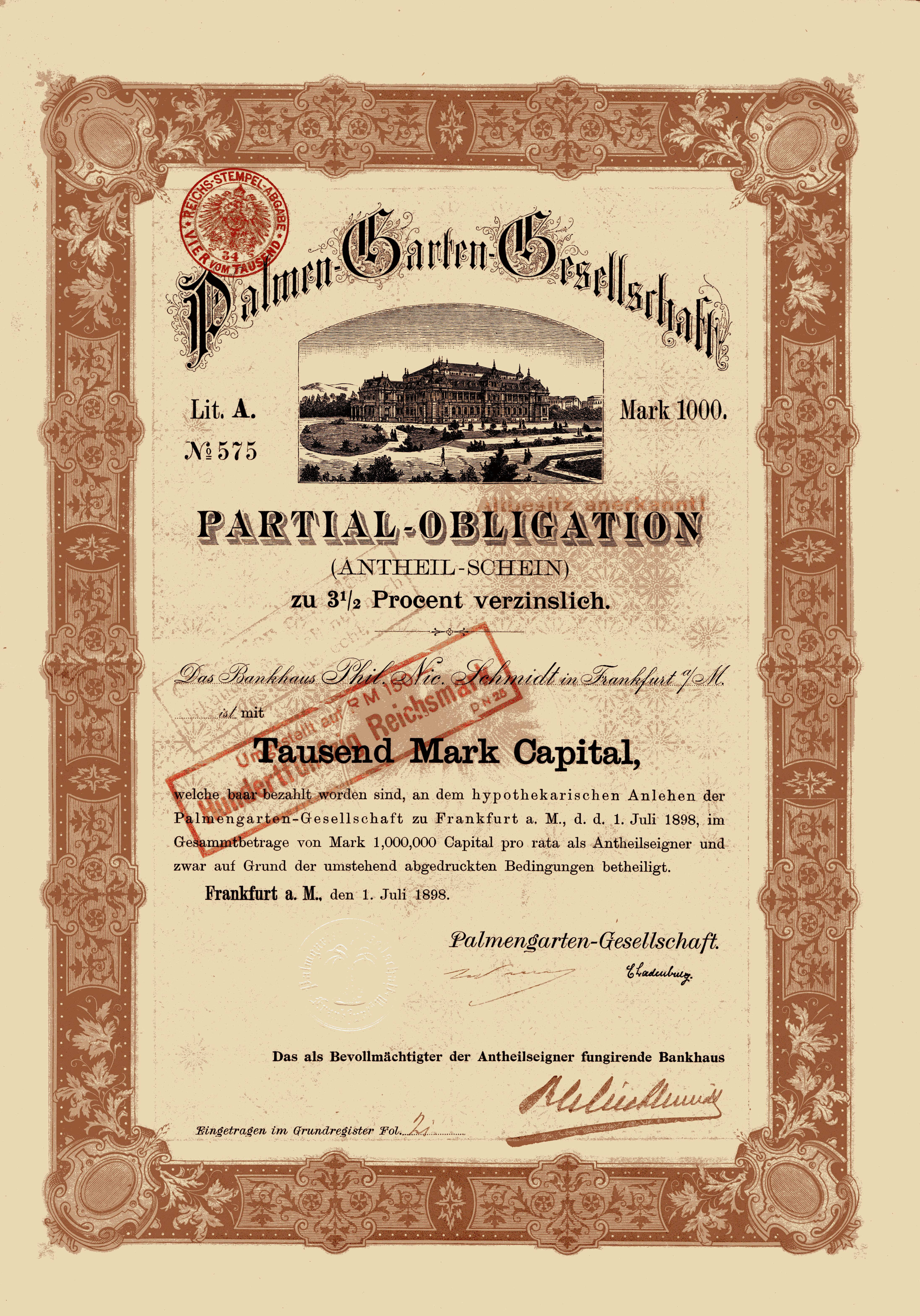
Bond of the Palmengarten-Gesellschaft, issued 1 July 1898

Like many public sites in Frankfurt, it was privately financed and implemented by the architect Heinrich Siesmayer. Work was completed in 1871 and opened to the public. Visitors included the American entertainer Buffalo Bill, who brought his Western show to the garden in 1890.

In 1931, it was taken over by the city of Frankfurt but was later transferred to the American occupation authorities after World War II. When the Palmengarten was returned to the city's hands in the sixties, a major reconstruction effort was begun. Halls destroyed in the war were redeveloped and expanded. In 1992 the reconstruction finished completely and the Palmengarten shined in its new form.

Directly next to the area of the Palmengarten is the Frankfurt Botanical Garden, which formerly belonged to the biology department of Johann Wolfgang Goethe-Universität Frankfurt and is now administered by the Palmengarten.

== Collection ==
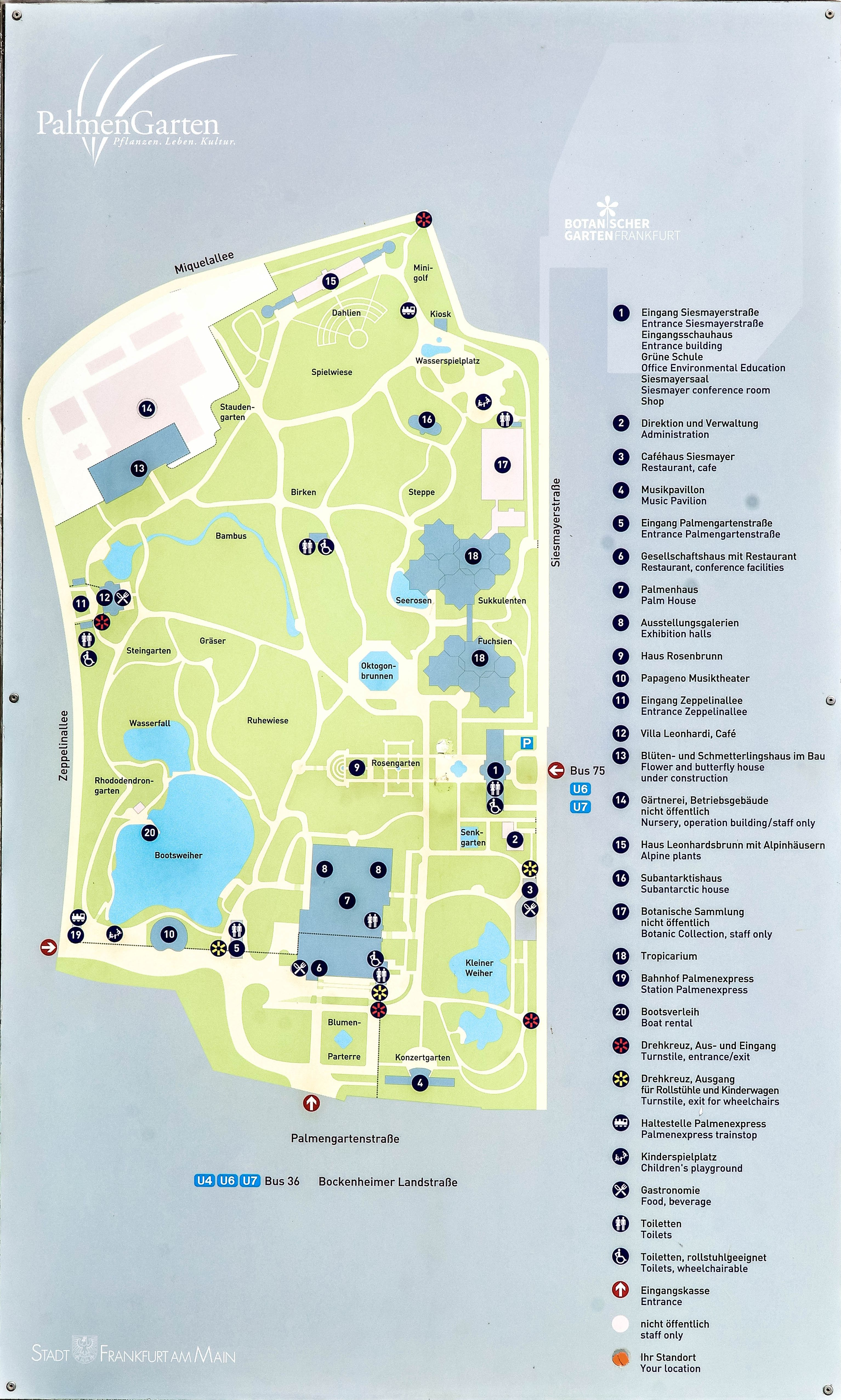
Plan

The botanical exhibits are organized according to their origin in free-air or climatized greenhouses, which also contain numerous tropical and subtropical plants.

At the entry to the garden half of the original social building of 1905, which was rebuilt again, currently serves as the main entrance to the Palmengarten. To the right and left of the entrance we find exhibition rooms and teaching rooms. On the first floor in the south wing are some carnivorous plants, in the north wing are some American pineapple plants, which are grown indoors. The visitor is "in situ", information points on the ecology and geography of everything on display.

Palmengarten gardens and facilities

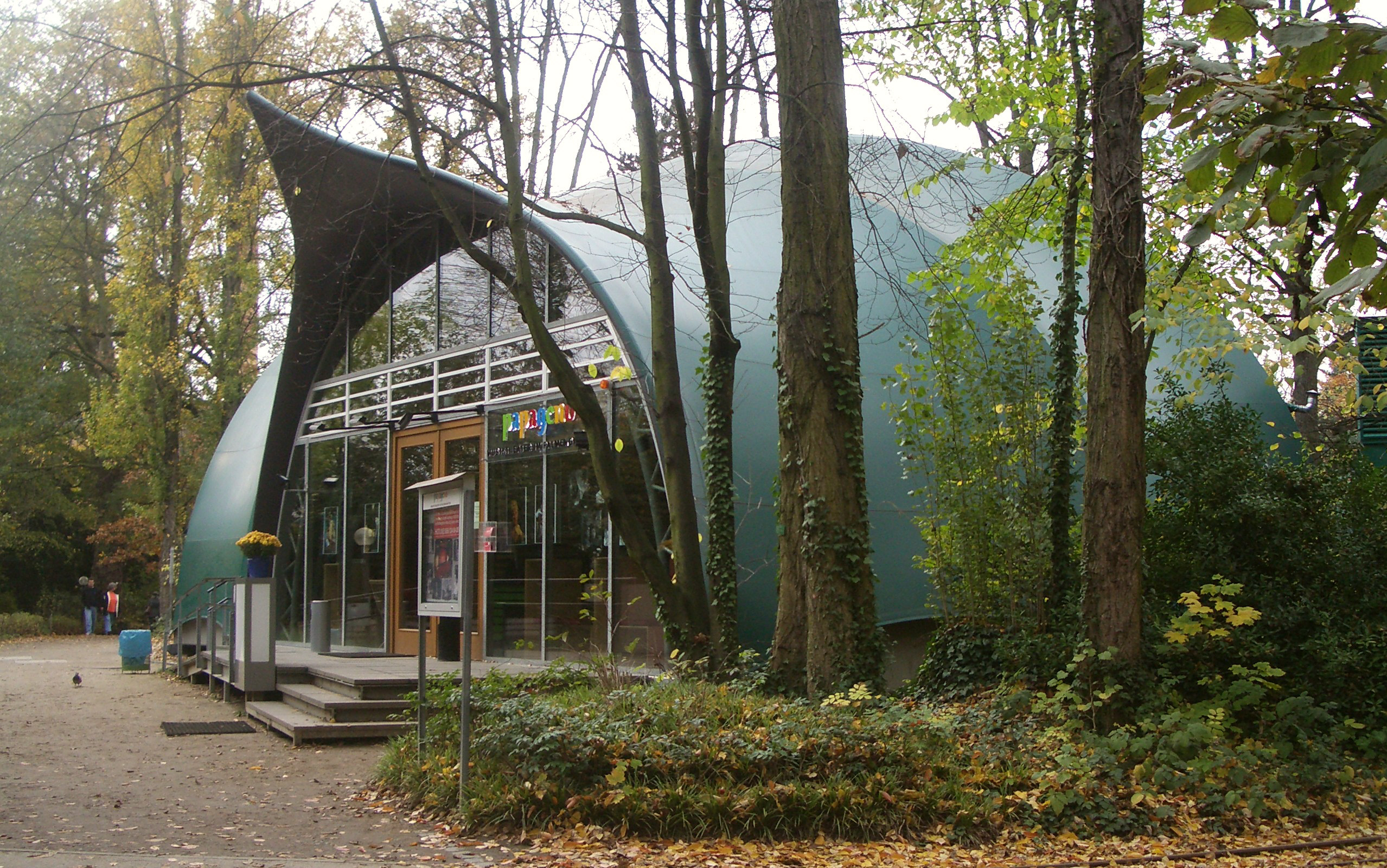
Papageno Theater

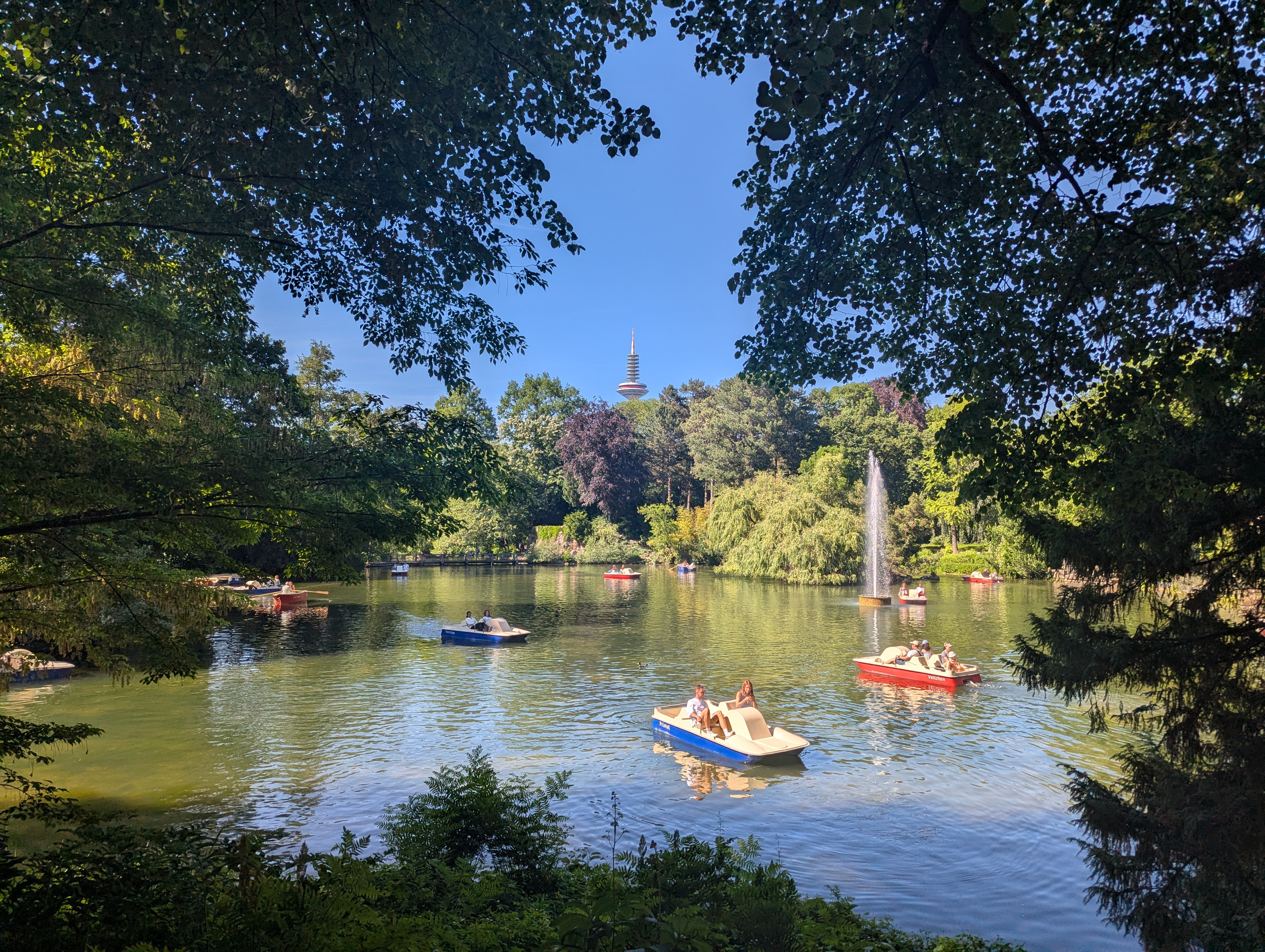
Boat pond

=== The Rose garden ===
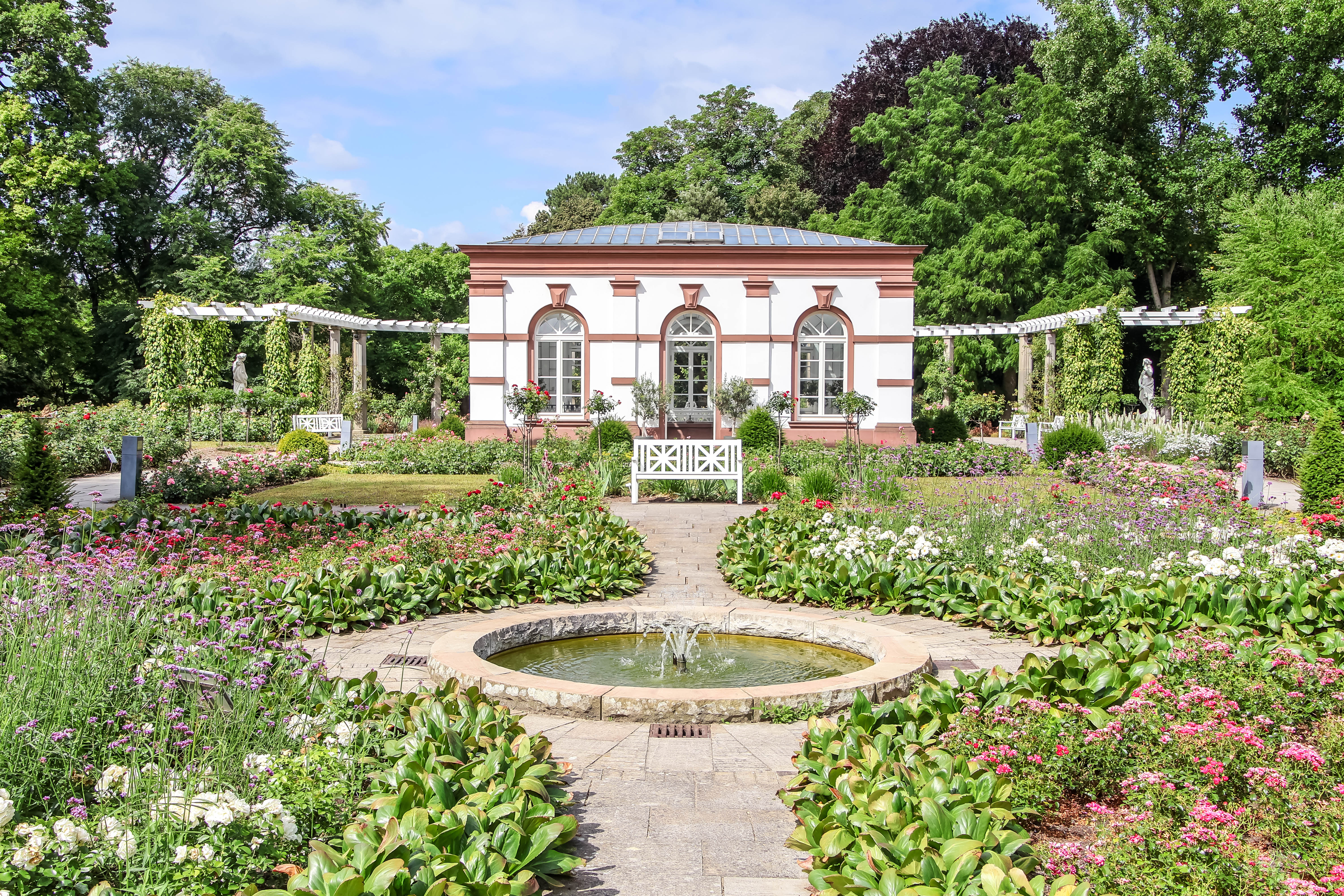
Rose garden

Beyond the entrance is the "Rosaleda", with a characteristic geometric style of plant distribution. A pergola gives the formal touch of rose garden, with its paths and its flower beds carefully cared for. The Rosenbrunn house is located in the middle, built in the early garden style of 1884, it had been part of the office buildings. Themed gardens (for example: with scent roses or the so-called "classic roses") delimit the rose garden to the north and south.

=== Palmenhaus ===
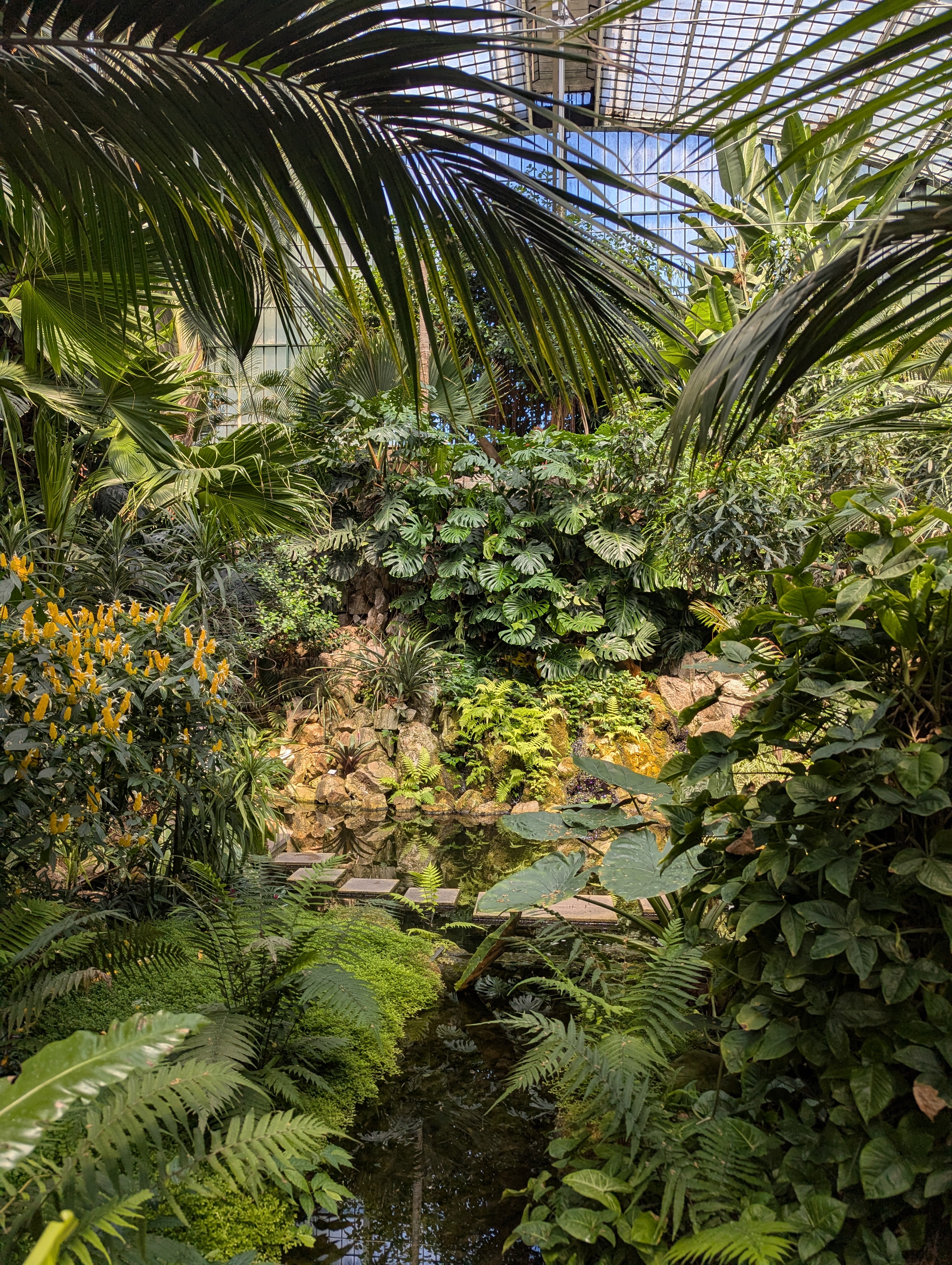
Palmenhaus (view as a 360° interactive panorama)

This is the main core of the original Palmengarten. It was built in 1869 and is one of the largest buildings of its kind found in Europe. Along with a large number of subtropical palm trees, and covering the lower part of the forest canopy are tree ferns, plants with long and tender stems, and broad-leaved plants, which together produce an image of great subtropical exuberance. There is also a stream that cascades down from the high back of the hill-shaped structure. In a grotto-like passageway under the hill, it is shown in aquariums, a colorful tropical underwater world.

=== Rhododendrongarten ===
In the western part of the gardens and bordering the lake located there, the Rhododendrongarten ('Garden of Rhododendrons') was created in 1989. Here a large variety of hybrids of species from eastern Asia and North America were planted side by side. These plants need a soil rich in humus and very acid for their development. Plants in this area tend to bloom in late May and early June.

=== The rockery ===
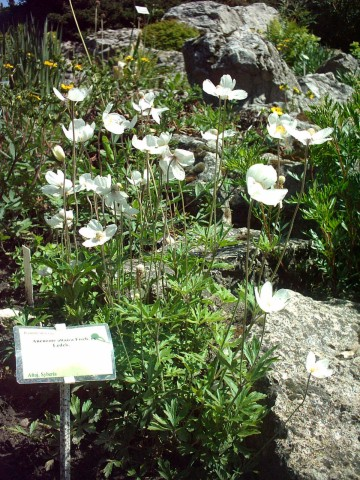
Anemone altaica in the rockery

It is located at the highest point of the garden, a rocky hill with a waterfall. From here, you get a view. The rockery (Der Steingarten, or Garden among the stones), is located on the flanks of the rocky hill, and it was completely renovated in the 80s. With acidic soils and Alkaline in small gaps between the rocks are these plants from all the mountainous regions of the planet.

=== Heather garden ===
Where the rockery ends, in the east, the heather garden begins with its color in the blooms of late summer. Also, there is the gradation of shades of green presented by the rest of the year, this collection of species of the genera Erica and Calluna.

=== Bush garden ===
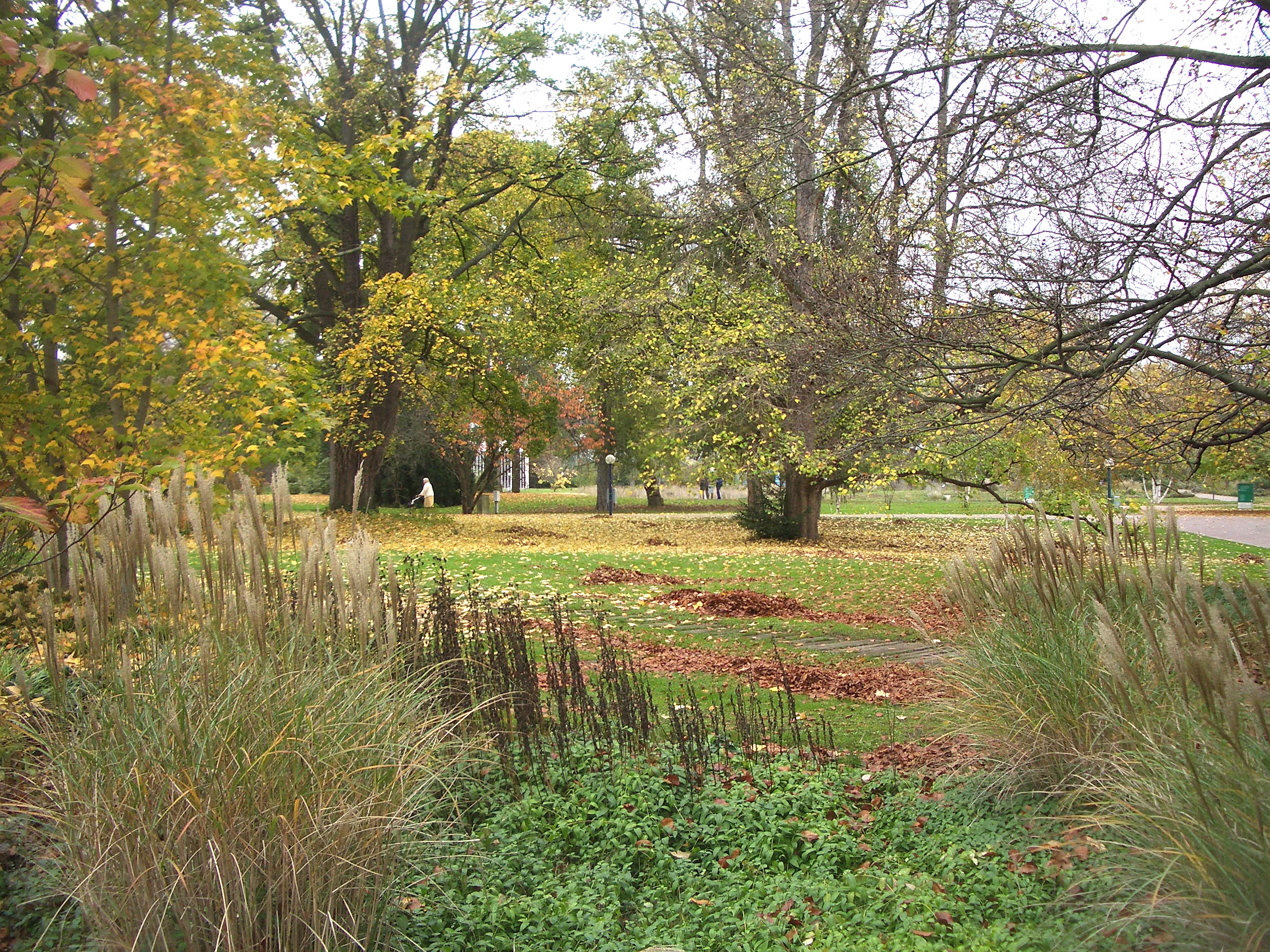
The Palmengarten in fall

It is located in the northern part of the garden. This part of the garden has puddled areas, with water and a stream accompanying along the main path of the walk. Here the plants grow grouped in bushes along the stream. Plants are found as green herbs, where the brushstrokes of color are provided by Asteraceae.

=== The flower house ===
An enclave worth visiting in the garden is the "Flower House". The house has about 200 m^{2} (2,200 square feet) and is divided into hot and cold zones. Here the visitor can find flowering plants at any time of the year. Here the plants are periodically renewed.

=== The alpine house ===
This is the house Leonhardsbrunn flanked on both sides by greenhouse towers, it was rebuilt according to old plans. Here the plants are shown with the place of origin and the expedition i they were collected on. In the western tower we find citrus, the eastern tower is dedicated to plants from the island of Tasmania. Plants from the Southern Hemisphere are grown in the central structure.

=== Steppe meadow ===
In the western part of the Tropicarium in a flat and drier area than in other parts of the garden, there is a collection of plants that develop in full sun. They are plants from the steppe estuary regions of Eurasia and the Americas.

=== The subantarctic house ===
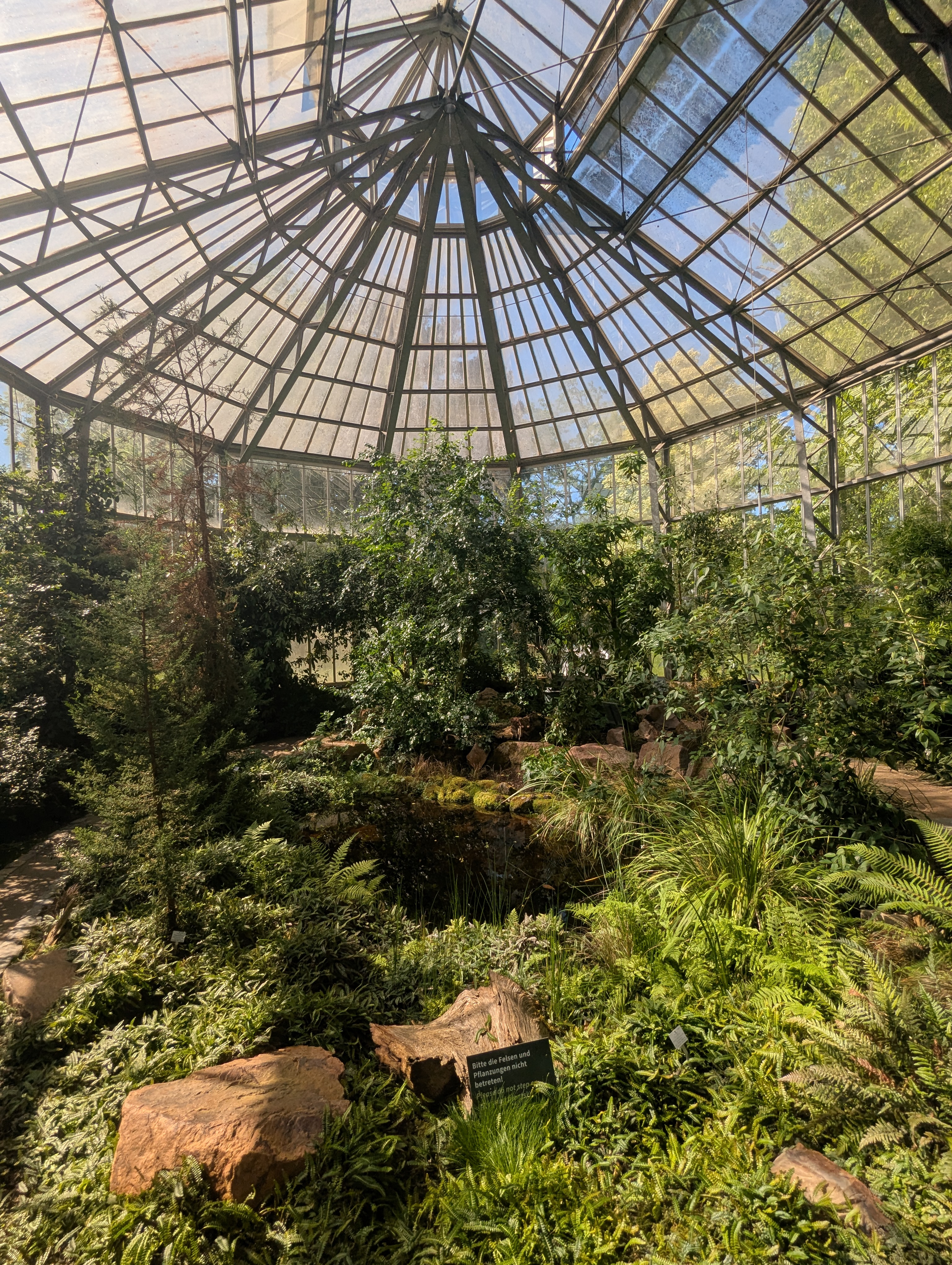
Subantarctic house

These facilities were opened in 1992, bringing together plants from the cold regions of the southern half of the globe. The characteristics of the vegetation are forest, shrub, and swamp areas. The red sandstone dominates on the left, where the plants of Patagonia, the Tierra del Fuego archipelago and the Falkland Islands are located, being delimited by a small swampy area. On the right side with a firm gray, are plants from New Zealand and neighboring islands.

=== The Tropicarium ===
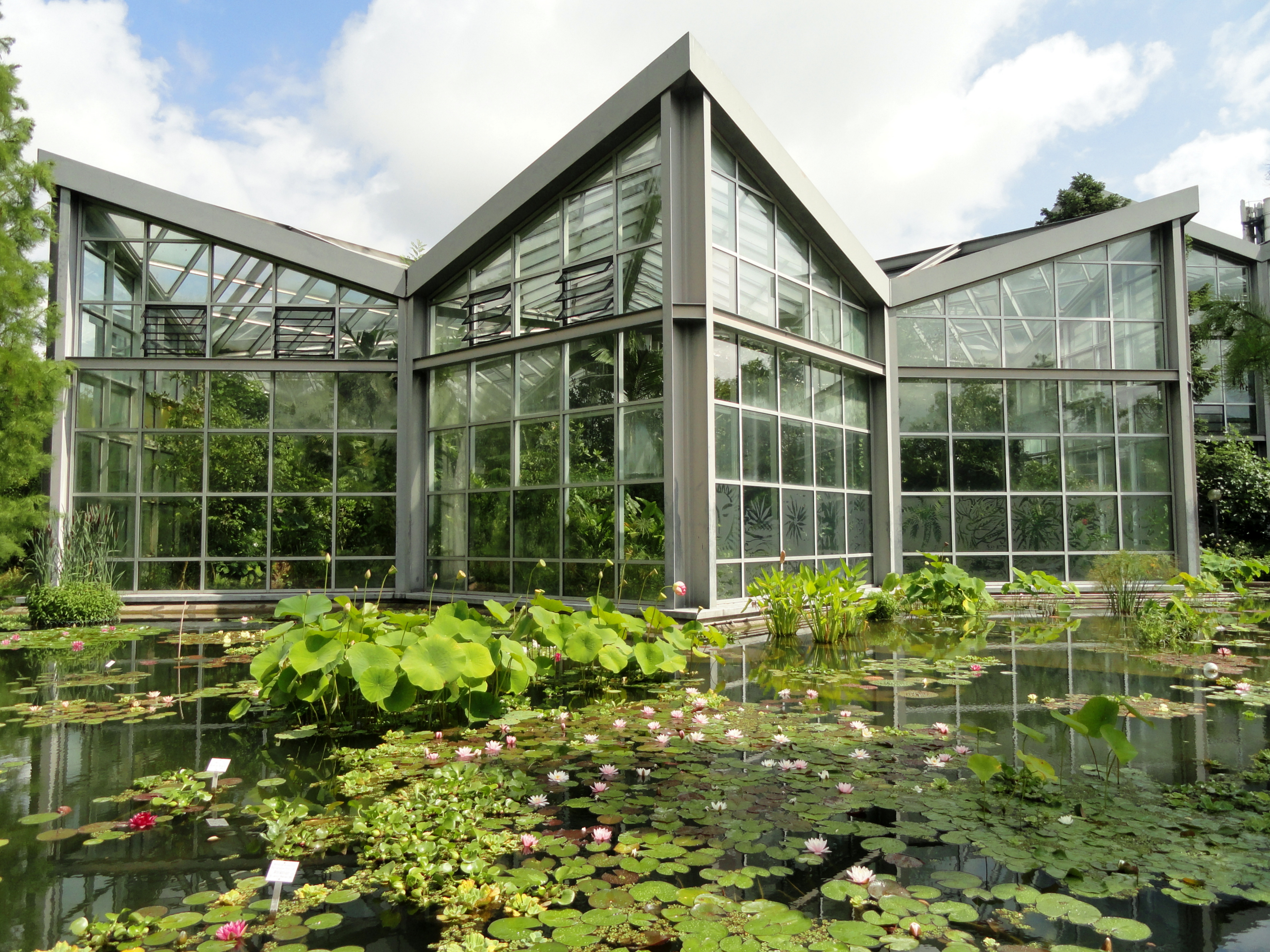
Tropicarium

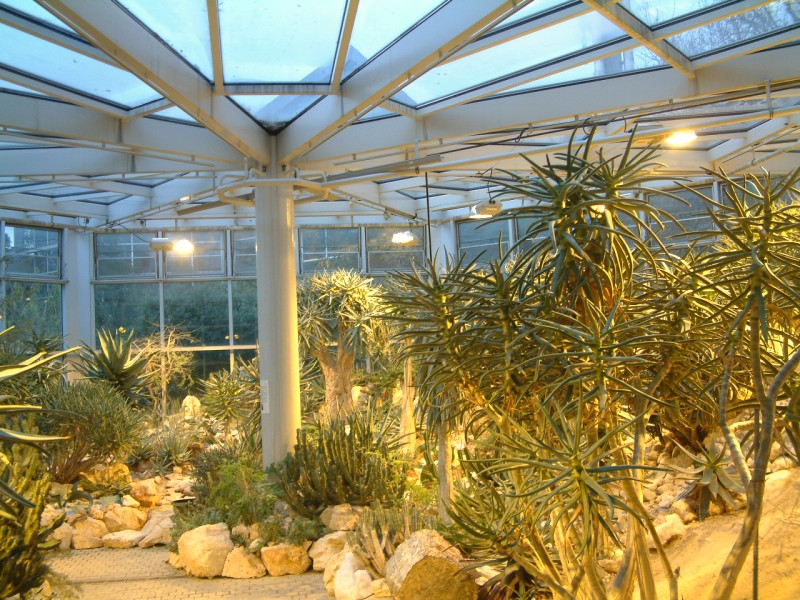
Desert house

The plants of the Tropicarium are not shown according to their continents or countries, but are grouped according to their biotope. What is attempted is to show the variety and richness of the tropical zone. The northern greenhouse "humid tropics" (Nordstern) includes plants of mountain rainforests, cloud forests and evergreen lowland rainforests. The southern greenhouse "arid tropical regions" (Südstern) contains plants from semi-arid zones, savanna, and foggy desert. The Tropicarium includes a total of 14 glass houses.

=== Cactus garden ===
Shown during the warm months from May through September, the cactus garden is a collection of succulent plants that withstand harsh winters. They come from America, Africa and from the Canary Islands. In between these plants a large variety of fuchsias are displayed at the same time.

== See also ==
- Botanischer Garten der Johann Wolfgang Goethe-Universität Frankfurt am Main, the other botanical garden in Frankfurt
- Nizza, Frankfurt
- List of botanical gardens in Germany
