= Martin Engelman =

- Born: February 22, 1924; Hoenkoop
- Died: March 27, 1992 (aged 68); Munich

Martin Engelman (1924–1992) was a Dutch painter and graphic artist.

Engelman was educated at the Amsterdamse Grafische School during the German occupation of the Netherlands under the lithographer and photographer Bernard F. Eilers in 1940–1941. To avoid being sent to a German forced labor camp in 1942, he fled to the south of the country where he stayed with an uncle and began work as a typesetter in Maastricht. He was able to travel to London in 1944 where he found work for the Dutch navy as a graphic designer making war propaganda. After the war he worked for A.M. Cassandre from 1948 to 1952.

His first signed works are registered from 1953. From 1970 to 1989 he worked as a teacher for the Hochschule der Künste in Berlin-Charlottenburg. His older brother Hans and son Piet were also painters.
