= New Byth =

Coordinates: 57.574°N 2.300°W

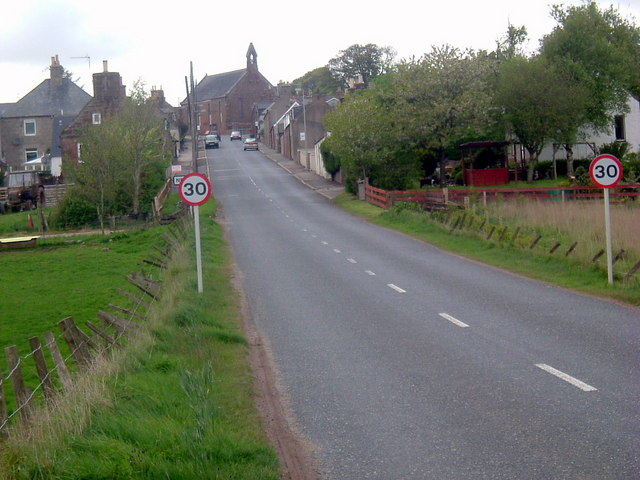
- Entering New Byth from the south

- Location within Aberdeenshire
- OS grid reference: NJ821538
- Council area: Aberdeenshire
- Lieutenancy area: Aberdeenshire
- Country: Scotland
- Sovereign state: United Kingdom
- Post town: TURRIFF
- Postcode district: AB53
- Dialling code: 01888
- Police: Scotland
- Fire: Scottish
- Ambulance: Scottish
- UK Parliament: Aberdeenshire North and Moray East
- Scottish Parliament: Banffshire and Buchan Coast

New Byth (Scots pronunciation: [nju bəɪθ]) is a small inland planned village in Aberdeenshire, Scotland, a few miles northeast of Cuminestown. It was founded in 1763 by the then Laird of Byth, James Urquhart.

The village has few facilities. The former primary school closed in 2005, followed by the Post Office in 2006 and the village pub in 2008. There are two former church buildings. The larger was previously affiliated to the Church of Scotland (1857, A & W Reid) and is now derelict. The smaller was associated with the United Free Church of Scotland until 1929 and is now owned by a community association, which hires it out as a general-purpose hall. The village had an active branch of the Scottish Women's Rural Institute for 50 years, until 2011, when it merged with the Monquhitter branch.

The village hosts an annual steam and vintage rally, usually on the Sunday closest to 1 July.

== Bibliography ==
- McKean, Charles (1990), Banff & Buchan, Royal Incorporation of Architects in Scotland, ISBN 978-1-85158-231-0
