= Jacques Nathan Garamond =

French graphic designer (1910–2001)

- Born: Jacques Nathan; March 26, 1910; Paris
- Died: February 25, 2001 (aged 90); Paris
- Known for: Graphic design, illustration, painting

Jacques Nathan Garamond (26 March 1910 – 25 February 2001) was a French graphic designer.

His birth name was Jacques Nathan. During the Second World War, he changed his last name to Garamond, and used his actual name of Nathan as a middle name.

He studied at the École nationale supérieure des arts décoratifs, and served as Director of Contemporary Architecture prior to commencing his career as a designer.

After the war, he became a graphic artist, whose work included the poster for the 1949 UNESCO exhibition "Les Droits de l'Homme" on the Rights of Man. He has also designed trademarks, packaging, book design, illustrations, posters and corporate identities. He has done commercial work for companies such as Mazda, Air France and Telefunken.

In 1952, Nathan Garamond became a founding member of the Alliance Graphique Internationale (AGI). His wife Cathy was an active supporter of AGI and was appointed as one of its officers for life. In 1957, Garamond received a gold medal at the Milan Triennale. In 1964 he participated in the Kassel Documenta III.

Garamond was a professor at the International School and professor at the École supérieure d'arts graphiques Penninghen.

His art is held by major institutions such as the Museum of Modern Art and the Smithsonian American Art Museum.
