= Trümmerfrau =

Female German and Austrian rebuilders after World War II

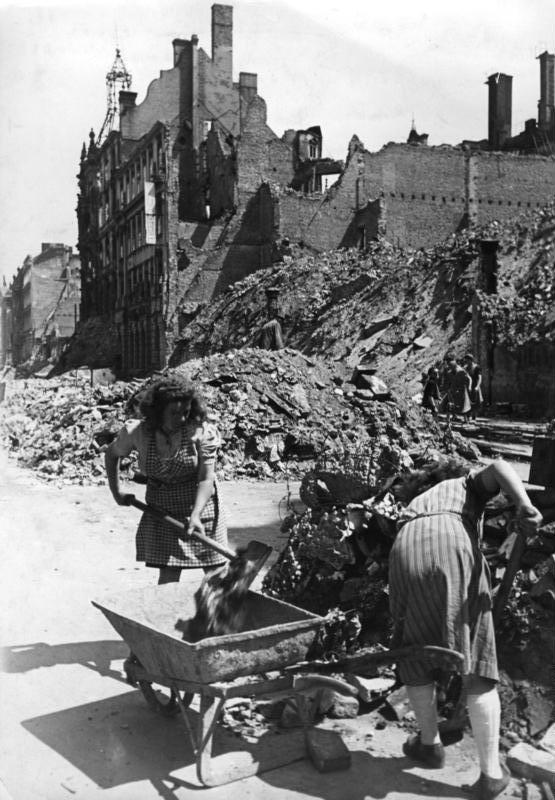
Trümmerfrauen at work in Berlin, July 1946

Trümmerfrauen (lit. rubble women, (Note: From Trümmer 'rubble' and Frauen 'women') singular Trümmerfrau German pronunciation: [ˈtʁʏmɐˌfʁaʊ̯]) were women who, in the aftermath of World War II, helped clear and reconstruct the bombed cities of Germany and Austria. Hundreds of cities had suffered significant bomb and firestorm damage from aerial attacks and ground war, and with many men dead or prisoners of war, this monumental task fell to a large degree on women.

== Degree of damage ==
3.6 million out of the sixteen million homes in 62 cities in Germany were destroyed during Allied bombings in World War II, with another four million damaged. Half of all school buildings, forty percent of the infrastructure, and many factories were either damaged or destroyed. According to estimates, there were about 500 million cubic metres of rubble (a volume of over 150 Great Pyramids of Giza) and 7.5 million people were made homeless.

== Removal of ruins ==
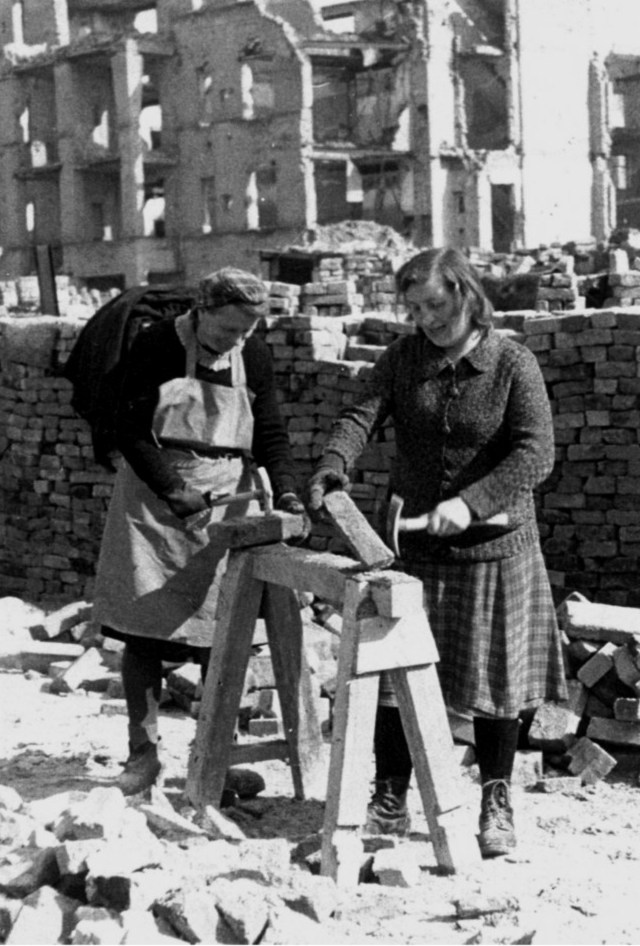
Trümmerfrauen at work in Berlin, c. 1947

Since the first Allied bombing raids in 1940 the Germans had become used to clearing up the resulting devastation, but most of this clearance work had been undertaken by forced laborers and POWs. However following the end of war they were no longer available and so the Germans had to do the work themselves.

In the very first days of the occupation the work was done by volunteers in return for offers of soup at the end of each day's work but within weeks former members of the Nazi Party and their associates were conscripted by the Allies into doing the work. Between 1945 and 1946, the Allied powers, in Allied-occupied Germany, ordered all women between 15 and 50 years of age to participate in the postwar cleanup. For this purpose, previous restrictive measures protecting women in the labor force were removed in July 1946. Recruitment of women was especially useful since at that time men were scarce; there were seven million more women than men in Germany.

Initially the work was uncoordinated and not done very effectively, with reports of rubble being thrown into the nearest underground train ventilation shaft, from which it later had to be removed.

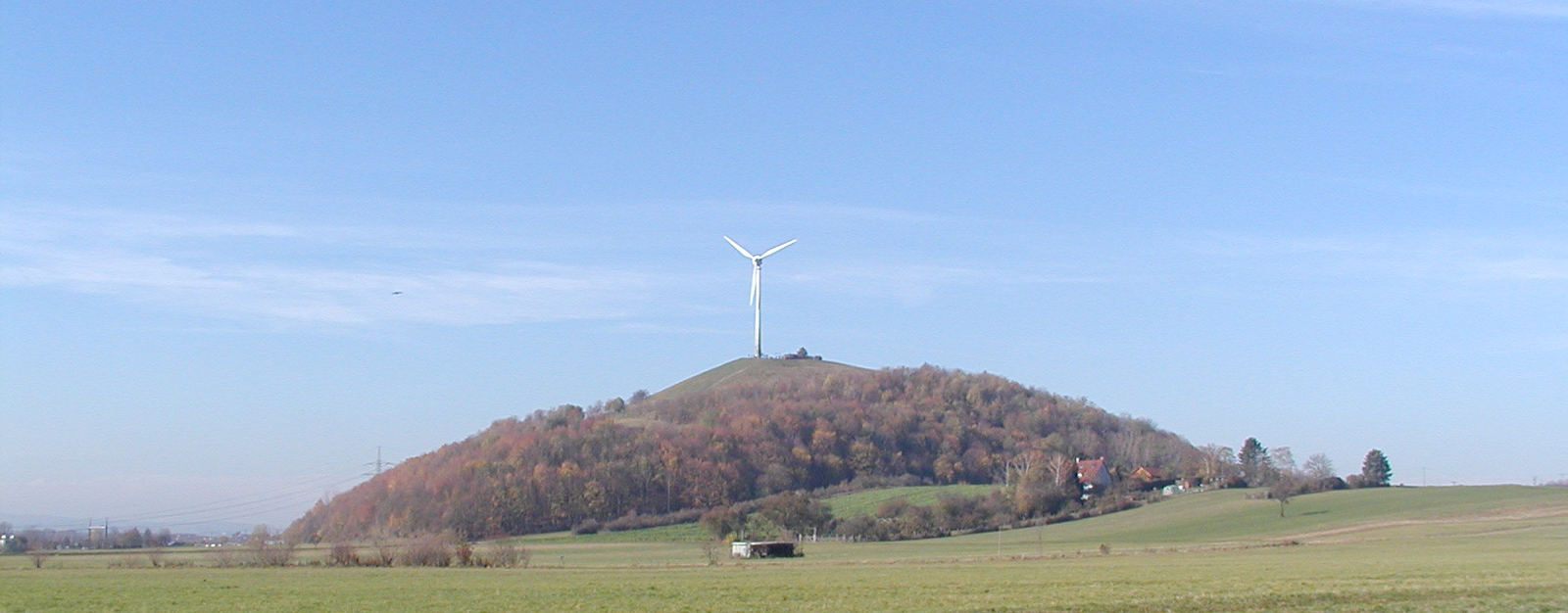
The Grüner Heiner, a schuttberg in Stuttgart-Weilimdorf

Usually, private enterprises were given assignments to remove the ruins, together with a permit to employ the women for that purpose. The main work was to tear down those parts of buildings that had survived the bombings, but were unsafe and unsuitable for reconstruction. Usually, no heavy machinery was used. The main tools were sledgehammers, picks, buckets and hand-winches. After tearing down the ruins, the remnants had to be further demolished, down to single bricks that could later be used in rebuilding. A bucket brigade of women would transfer the bricks to the street, where they were cleaned and stacked. Wood and steel beams, fireplaces, wash basins, toilets, pipes and other household items were collected to be reused. The remaining debris was then removed by barrows, wagons and lorries. Some of it was later reused to fill bomb craters and trenches left in the streets or to make new bricks. Light railways were often constructed to transport the rubble out to rubbish heaps. In some cities, Schuttberge (debris mountains) were created from leftover debris and exist today in a number of German cities, the best known of which is Teufelsberg in Berlin, which were built over a period of 22 years from debris transported by up to 80 trucks a day.

Trümmerfrauen, both volunteers and regular workers, worked in all weather. They were organised in Kolonnen (columns) of ten to twenty.

=== Pay ===
The average workday of a Trümmerfrau was nine hours long with one 20–30 minute lunch break. The women were paid 72 Reichspfennige (Pfennig) per hour and one food ration card per day. The food ration was very small, and the card could only feed one person for a day.

The American journalist Margaret Bourke-White commented in 1945:

"These women forming one of the many human conveyor belts which were organized to clean up the city passed their pails of broken bricks from hand to hand with such slow motion that I felt they had calculated the minimum speed at which they could work and still draw their 72 pfennigs an hour."

== Later works and recognition ==
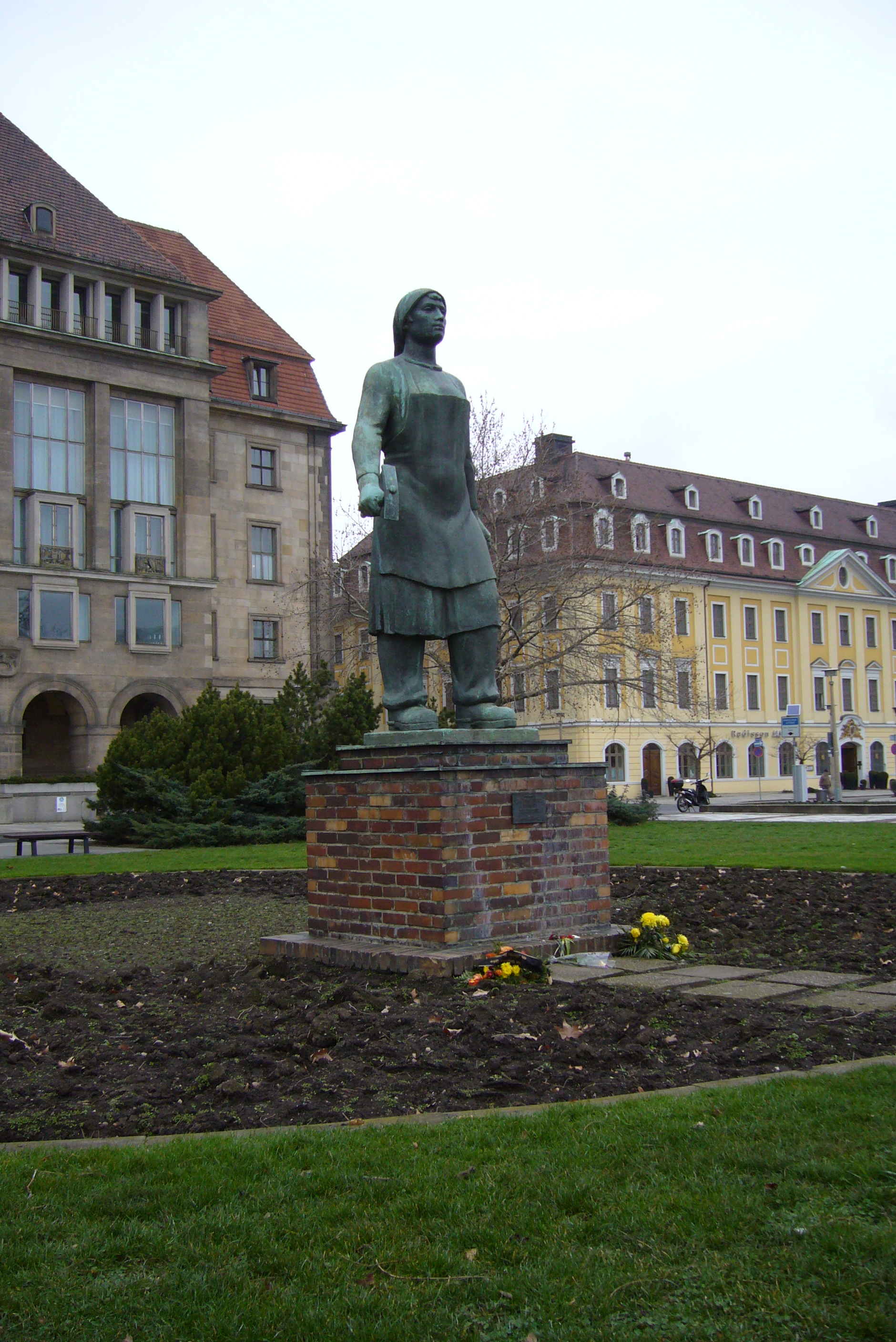
Trümmerfrauen memorial, Dresden

In the Soviet Occupation Zone, the Nationales Aufbauwerk (National Reconstruction Works) was founded, in order to coordinate the efforts of the Trümmerfrauen.

In the Western Allied Occupation Zones, the removal works continued as Notstandsarbeiten (State-of-emergency Works), until the cities were cleaned and the reconstruction could begin.

In both parts of Germany, as well as in Austria, the efforts of the Trümmerfrauen were recognised with numerous ceremonies, memorials, awards and exhibitions.

Their role was also considered important in changing post-war gender roles in Germany, though the concept of women as independent workers was taken up more eagerly in the official views of East Germany than in West Germany, where, once peace and economic prosperity was restored, a tendency reemerged in some parts of society to return women to their traditional family role.

== Across Germany ==
=== Aachen ===
On 4 October 2006, a weekly newspaper published the memoirs of the Trümmerfrau Elisabeth Stock (83), including the following passage:

"... it were mostly women who shoveled their way through the rubble of Aachen's inner city that was totally destroyed; just for one bowl of soup from the Americans, we hammered and dragged debris all day long, even the pickaxe was part of our equipment ... that's probably one reason why they put a memorial plaque for Aachen's Trümmerfrauen at the back of the townhall."

=== Berlin ===
Within the four occupied sectors of Berlin approximately 10 per cent of the buildings were irreparably destroyed. This left behind an estimated 55 million cubic metres of rubble to be cleared. In the central districts of Berlin-Mitte, Kreuzberg, Friedrichshain, Prenzlauer Berg, Tiergarten, and Wedding up to 30 per cent were destroyed. For this reason, the Trümmerfrauen had to work hard and their commitment gained widespread recognition:

In 1946, the Allied headquarters published a series of stamps, the so-called "Bärenmarken", for the whole of Berlin. The graphic designers Alfred Goldhammer and Heinz Schwalbe created four images with symbols of the reconstruction, e.g. a bear with a brick, a bear with a shovel, a bear with a beam and a young oak tree in front of the ruins at Belle-Alliance square.

On 13 October 1950 the mayor of East-Berlin Friedrich Ebert offered a newly built flat to a former Trümmerfrau in honour of her commitment. The flat was located in one of the terraces in the street which was at the time called Stalinallee and had been designed by Hans Scharoun.

Erika Heß, mayor of the district of Wedding, initiated the founding of a club for the Trümmerfrauen. Its members were invited for coffee and cake once a year, received assistance when they needed to complete official business, and excursions were arranged for them.

=== Bremen ===
In May 2005, the Bremen organisation Friedensforum initiated a two-hour meeting under the motto Mother's Day – in a different way. Additionally to various activities such as music performances or discussion groups etc., a Trümmerfrau and a pupil met for public discussion.

=== Chemnitz ===
In 2001, due to an initiative of the 1998-founded club Verein figürliches Glockenspiel im Alten Rathaus-Turm zu Chemnitz e.V and with the support of numerous donors, a carillon with 25 bells was installed. Three times a day the six figures, each one metre tall, come out of the tower. One of them represents a Trümmerfrau, holding a brick on her knee with her left hand, and a hammer in her right hand. The figures were designed by the sculptor Johannes (Hannes) Schulze from Plauen and forged by the bell foundry Rudolf Perner Karlsruhe und Passau.

== Fashion ==
In 1945 and 1946, fashion in Berlin began to change very quickly, and it was soon labeled the fashion capital. During the war, women sold just about everything they owned for food. The stockings on their legs and carpets in their homes could be exchanged for a sack of potatoes. Once the Allied soldiers arrived and the long process of clearing the rubble began, the Trümmerfrauen realized that they could continue to sell the objects they found in other buildings. A large number of rags were pulled out from beneath the debris. A few of the old shop owners pulled out their sewing machines and began to stitch the rags together into dresses. The dresses were titled Lumpenkleider, meaning "rag dresses".

There were three reasons for the creation of the dresses. First, they gave a sense of normalcy and hope that things would one day go back to how they had been. Second, dresses immediately after the war served aesthetic purposes, in other words making the women more appealing to the Allied soldiers. Third, dresses were worth 10,000–20,000 Reichsmarks each.

The German word Fräulein (at the time) defined a woman that fraternized with a soldier, an act that was strictly forbidden during the war. Upon the war's end, the women had run out of items to barter for food, so they resorted to trading themselves. If a woman could attract the attention of an Allied soldier, she was likely to receive payment in the form of food, or in some cases protection from other men. Fortunate women possessed rag dresses that made them much better at attracting Allied soldiers. The strategy was so beneficial that people began to make many garments out of mitgebrachten Stoffen – "salvaged material". Eventually, many women attained dresses and used prostitution, then tolerated, as a night job while clearing rubble during the day. The busy nights led to a growing entertainment industry of many cabarets and bars in Berlin.

=== Negative ===
A large increase in prostitution between the German women and Allied soldiers led to many contracting venereal diseases. The U.S. government created "Veronika Dankeschön" (an allusion to "Venereal disease"), a diseased cartoon seductress starring in a media campaign designed to scare U.S. soldiers into ending sexual relations with German women. As German men returned home they began to call these women prostitutes. Raingard Esser, a doctor of medieval and modern history, believes the men acted like that in order to express their anger and strife over the knowledge that their women had to sell themselves to survive, while they, the men, were now also dependent on the women.

== Legend ==
Historian Leonie Treber recognizes that many cities and people regard the Trümmerfrauen as a great movement of heroism and strength. However, she disagrees with the size that people have made it out to be. Berlin mobilized 60,000 women to remove the rubble leftover from the war, yet this number was only 5% of the female population. In areas like Berlin's British sector, Treber reports that the percentage of women who joined in the difficult job was only a third of one percent.

According to Treber, many saw the job as punishment or beneath them, as the Nazis had made the Hitler Youth, POWs, and concentration camp prisoners remove the debris from bombed-out cities. Immediately after the war, members of the Nazi Party were forced to take the place of the forced laborers. However they were insufficient, and women stepped up to the task in exchange for an hourly wage and food ration cards.

The later use of the Trümmerfrauen as a media campaign representing a large unified movement was very successful in East Germany. The same idea did not travel far in West Germany until the 1980s. Treber states that the reason for this was that the independent tireless woman did not resonate with the "conservative female image".

== See also ==
- Reconstruction of Germany
- Wirtschaftswunder
