= Post-war reconstruction of Frankfurt =

History of Frankfurt

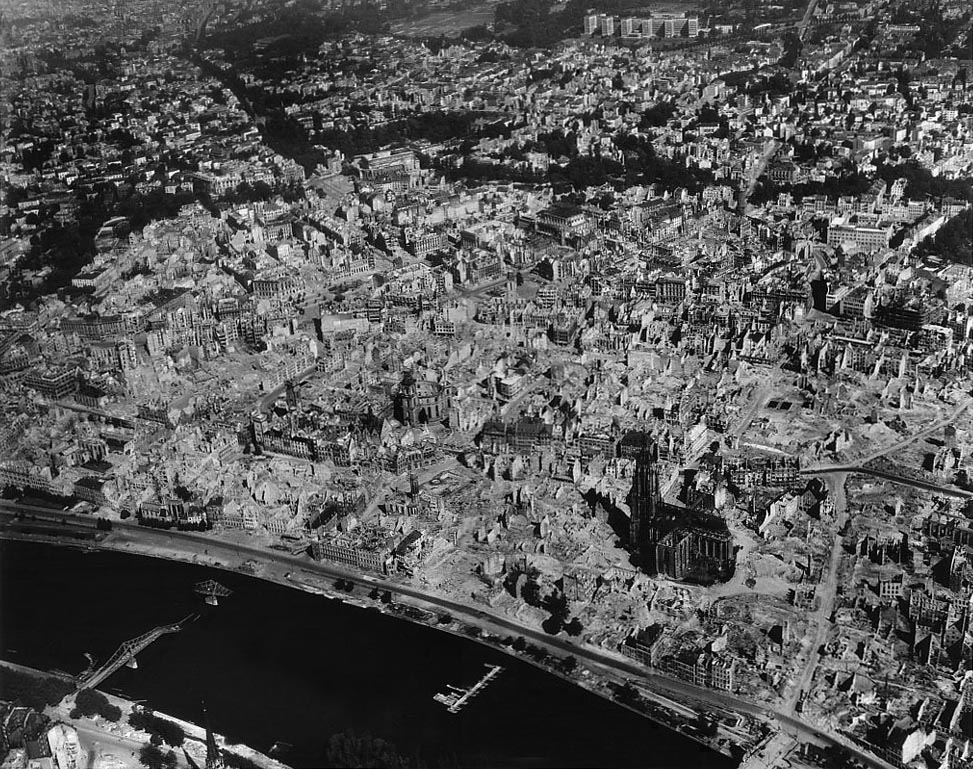
The Old Town of Frankfurt in June 1945 showing the destruction caused by the allied bombing raids

The post-war reconstruction of Frankfurt in Germany took place broadly between 1945 and the 1960s, during which time the city of Frankfurt removed the rubble created by Allied raids and the subsequent battle by Allied ground forces to take the city and rebuilt the damaged parts of area.

To remove and recycle the rubble the city authorities in the autumn of 1945 created in partnership with the Metallgesellschaft industrial group and the Philipp Holzmann and Wayss & Freytag construction companies established the Trümmerverwertungsgesellschaft (TVG). This non-profit company was tasked with removing the rubble and recycling it. Initially the removed rubble was piled up on a Schuttberg (rubble mountain) called Monte Scherbelino, before the material was recycled and processed to such an extent that by 1964 the Schuttberg had completely disappeared.

Once the rubble was removed from the damaged areas post-war reconstruction of the city took place in a sometimes simple modern style, thus changing Frankfurt's architectural face. A few significant historical landmark buildings were reconstructed, albeit in a simplified manner — e.g. St. Paul's Church (which was the first to be rebuilt), Goethe House, and Römer.

== Background ==
Large parts of the city centre of Frankfurt were destroyed by Allied air raids in the Second World War. Further damage was caused during the campaign by American ground forces to take the city, which was declared secure on 29 March 1945, although some sporadic fighting continued until 4 April 1945.

The air raids and ground fighting left an estimated 11.7 million to 13 million cubic metres of rubble had to removed. While an estimated 8,600 buildings remained intact, 30,000 were badly damaged.

== History ==
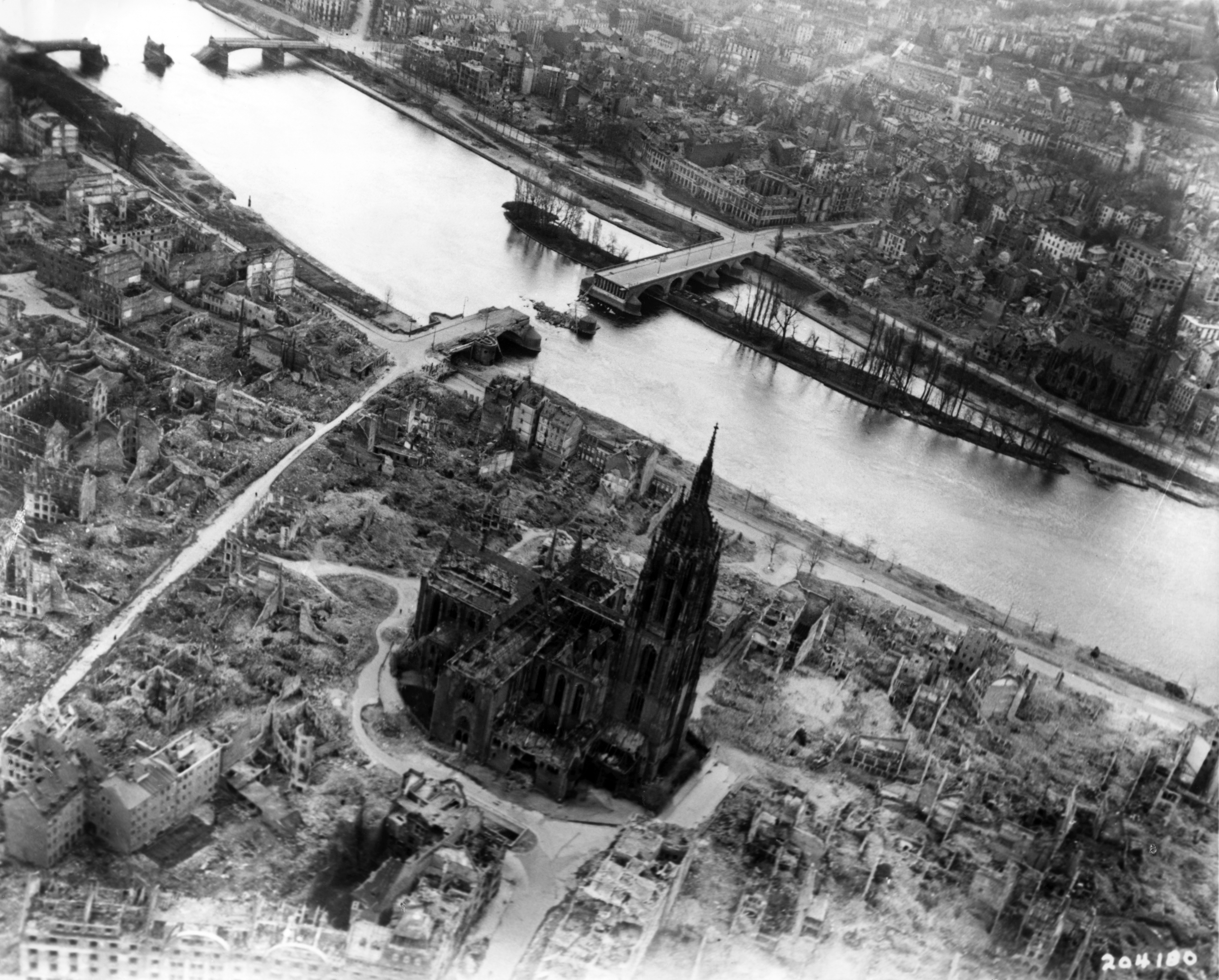
Frankfurt 1945

=== Creation of the Trümmerverwertungsgesellschaft ===
While other cities in Germany quickly organized resources to remove the rubble left by the Allied bombing raids, Frankfurt initially seemed to be doing very little.

The city authorities had however decided that a unified approach was needed to clear and process the rubble so in partnership with the Metallgesellschaft industrial group and the Philipp Holzmann and Wayss & Freytag construction companies it established the Trümmerverwertungsgesellschaft mbH in the autumn of 1945. Subsequently, known as the "Frankfurt Procedure", this approach was widely recognized in Germany and abroad.

The city of Frankfurt am Main held 51 percent of the shares in the Trümmerverwertungsgesellschaft, having contributed RM900,000 to its capital. The company was tasked with (a) undertaking research into and planning the most efficient means of removing and recycling the rubble, (b) removing and transporting the rubble to the processing facility, (c) constructing and operating the processing facility and a concrete goods factory and (d) selling the products of the processing facility and concrete goods factory.

=== Confiscation of the rubble ===
Following the establishment of the Trümmerverwertungsgesellschaft the mayor Kurt Blaum issued on a provisional basis a so-called "rubble confiscation order" on 30 December 1945, that confiscated on behalf of the city all of the building rubble in the Frankfurt urban area, a legally extremely controversial measure (based on the Reichsleistungsgesetz) that allowed the new company to tackle the removal of the debris. This seizure also affected buildings that were still standing but which were more than 70 percent damaged. Many house and property owners in Frankfurt like in a number of cities did not want to accept this, and it was challenged in court on a number of occasions. Property owners argued that as they had paid for the material that was now rubble they should not have to pay again when it was used again to rebuild. The municipal authorities counterargued that the clearance cost typically exceeded the value of the material and that the property owners gained as they did not have to pay for the cost of removing the rubble. Generally the courts ruled in flavour of the municipality.

Following the founding of the Federal Republic the State of Hessen issued a clearing rubble act on 4 October 1949 which provided a legal basis for Frankfurt's action.

=== Removal of the rubble ===
Initially many thousands of citizens voluntarily began clearing city by hand. Following the issue of the confiscation order the company took over organizing clearing of the almost completely destroyed old town and city centre of Frankfurt in 1946. Blaum was succeeded as mayor in 1946 by the tall and very stout Walter Kolb, who together with the other leadership of the city administration picked up jackhammers, pickaxes and shovels to give the population a clear and positive signal to start over and to rebuild. Rather than adopt the approach of other German cities and clear whole city blocks Frankfurt, like Essen, preferred to clear the rubble from individual sites, despite it taking longer.

Mechanical clearing equipment was virtually non-existent at the time, so the rubble had to be chopped up manually with a pickaxe and shovel and manually shifted from the paths and streets onto uninhabitable land. Once the streets and squares were at least partially cleared trucks could then be used to move the rubble. By the end of 1947, 26 kilometres of downtown streets had already been cleared of rubble. The rubble heaps were now temporarily piled up in various places in the city.

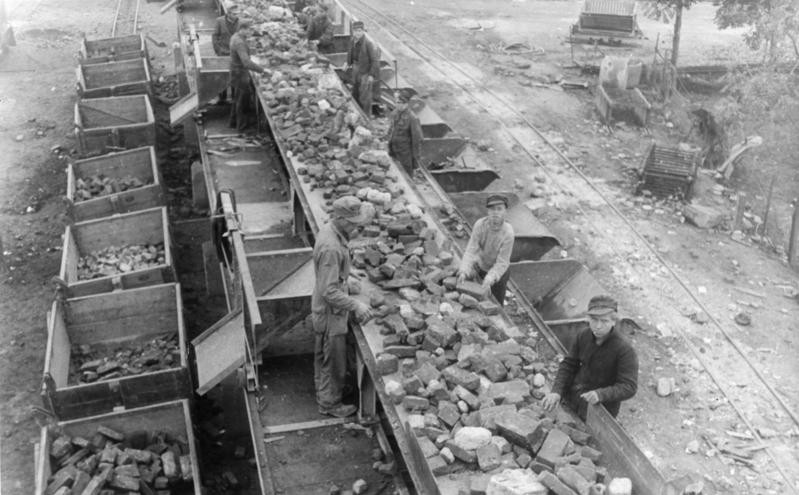
Sorting rubble stones 1947

In 1946, rails for a narrow-gauge field railway, the so-called "Trümmerexpress", or more popularly "Adolf Hitler Gedächtnisbahn" ("Adolf Hitler Memorial Express"), were laid from the Scheffeleck, on the edge of the city centre in Nordend, to the site of the former stadium on Riederwald and Ratsweg on Ostpark. The steam locomotive with its tipping carriages operated until 1948, after which the rails were removed and the transporting of rubble was undertaken by heavy trucks from the US Army which had been converted into dump trucks with high tail lifts. These were used until 1954.

=== Monte Scherbelino ===
After having been designated by the city as a rubble dumping area on 16 November 1943 a monumental Schuttberg (debris hill) began growing at the foot of the Bornheimer slope and opposite the Ostpark on the former site of the site of the former Eintracht Stadium on Ratsweg in Riederwald. The Frankfurters quickly gave it the catchy and belittling name of Monte Scherbelino (a faux-Italian pun meaning "Shard Mountain") because of the high proportion of broken glass in the debris. It grew to contain 10 to 12 million cubic metres (350 to 420 million cu ft) of debris and reached a height of approximately 47 metres (154 ft).

The term was not new, as it had already used for the municipal household waste dump in the city forest between Babenhäuser Landstrasse and Darmstädter Landstrasse, which had been in use since 1925 and continued to be up until 1968 when it was turned into a popular amusement park. The Monte Scherbelino in the city forest was only used to a small extent as a landfill for debris from the air raids. As the material contained in it was processed and recycled Monte Scherbelino on Ratsweg slowly reduced in size until it totally disappeared.

=== Rubble processing facility ===
A provisional crushing and screening plant designed by Lurgi – Gesellschaft für Chemie (a subsidiary of Metallgesellschaft) was established in 1947 on a 10 hectare building site bounded by Ratsweg, Am Riederbruch and Riederspießstraße in Frankfurt's Riederwald. After the debris had been sifted and sorted to remove metal, glass and other valuable raw materials, the remaining rubble was converted into aggregates.

Scientific investigations by chemists had discovered that by heating the rubble it would produce a plaster which could then be broken down into calcium oxide and sulphur dioxide which could be formed into a sintered pumice. This material could be used as an aggregate in cement, which was in high demand due to all of the reconstruction projects underway in Germany. This led to the construction of a sintering plant and a concrete plant which were completed in 1950, following which the temporary plant was dismantled. The concrete plant used the aggregates for the production of concrete, while the sintering plant recycled the fine rubble, which produced a concrete aggregate free of all undesirable admixtures. This made it popular with the construction industry.

The newly manufactured building materials were checked and funded by the Frankfurt building supervisory authority in cooperation with the Hessian Ministry of the Interior.

By the autumn of 1947, around 300,000 solid bricks and 400,000 roof tiles had already been produced. Even before the new facility was fully completed in 1950, 30 million solid and hollow blocks had been produced to rebuild Frankfurt. Initially the facility had an annual output of 20 million solid bricks and nearly 1.6 million hollow blocks, which four years later had increased to an annual output to 23 million solid bricks, 6.6 million hollow blocks and about 300,000 square metres of slab stones. Once at full capacity the facility was able to process 1,500 to 2,000 cubic metres of rubble daily, which it converted into 850 to 900 cubic metres of compacted concrete. The maximum daily output was 3,584 cubic metres in June 1953. This added up to an average annual output of more than 200,000 cubic metres of crushed brick concrete, which was used directly on site to produce solid stones, hollow blocks, wall panels, roof tiles and roof tiles.

The Trümmerverwertungsgesellschaft was able to process even the fine debris and thus avoid the large mountain of rubble that were formed in other cities. The rubble clearance process was so efficient that the TVG was making a profit from 1952 onwards. The processing facility worked two shifts and was employing 638 people at the beginning of July 1955. Over the course of ten years, the TVG removed a total of 10 million cubic metres of rubble, from which the rubble recycling company recovered almost 20,000 tons of scrap, 8,500 tons of steel girders and produce 120 million bricks. It is estimated that the TVG enabled the recovery reconstruction of approximately 100,000 apartments and commercial buildings. The merging of the tasks of debris clearance, debris sorting, debris processing and debris recycling into a single non-profit company that combined the core competencies of several private companies and the city administration of Frankfurt was considered unique at the time and attracted a lot of national and international attention as well as visitors to witness the operation of what was the world's largest processing facility of its kind.

=== Disestablishment of the Trümmerverwertungsgesellschaft ===
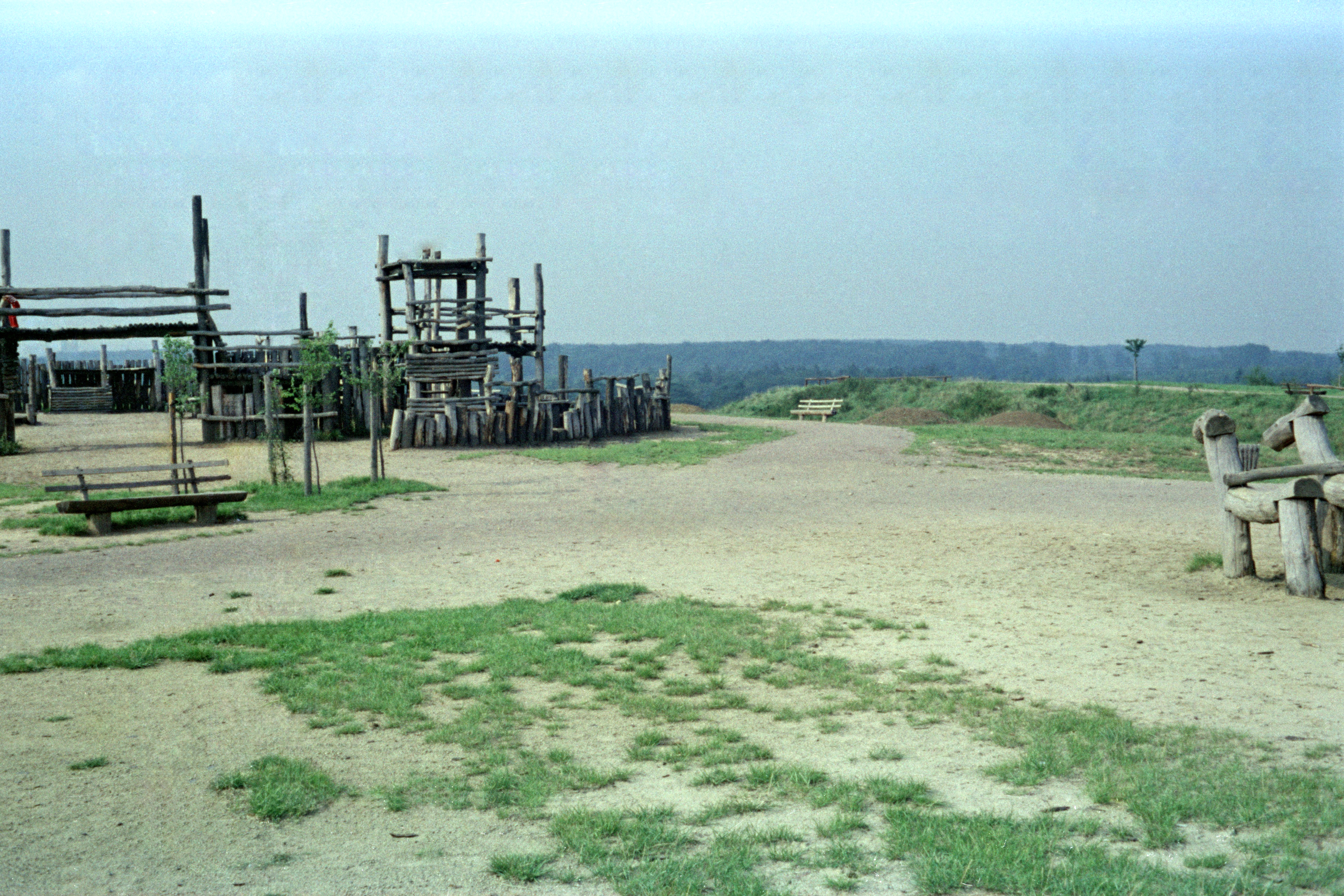
Playground on the site of Monte Scherbelino in the late 1970s

By the early 1960s the Trümmerverwertungsgesellschaft had completed the removal and recycling of the existing rubble and as a result was officially closed by the municipal authorities on 29 April 1963, but did not cease its work until 1964, when it was dissolved. and the facilities were demolished and the 72 metre high chimney was blown up in 1965.

Three years after the demolition of the rubble processing facility, the Frankfurt Dippemess (traditional fair) was held on the former site for the first time in 1968 and continued to be held there up until 2009. In 1981 the Eissporthalle Frankfurt (ice rink) was built on the site. The ice rink was later joined by a car dealership and a metro wholesale market.

== See also ==
- Reconstruction of Germany
