= Blaum =

Blaum is a surname. Notable people with this surname include:

- Damián Blaum (born 1981), Argentine Olympic open water swimmer
- Kevin Blaum (born 1952), former American politician
- Klaus Blaum (born 1971), German physicist
- Kurt Blaum (1884–1970), German politician
- Ryan Blaum (born 1983), American professional golfer
