= Birkenkopf =

Hill in Stuttgart, Germany

The Birkenkopf
- Location within Baden-Württemberg

Highest point
- Elevation: 511 m (1,677 ft)
- Coordinates: 48°45′55″N 9°7′54″E

Naming
- English translation: Birch-Head
- Language of name: German

Geography
- Location: Stuttgart, Baden-Württemberg, Deutschland

Geology
- Mountain type: Schuttberg

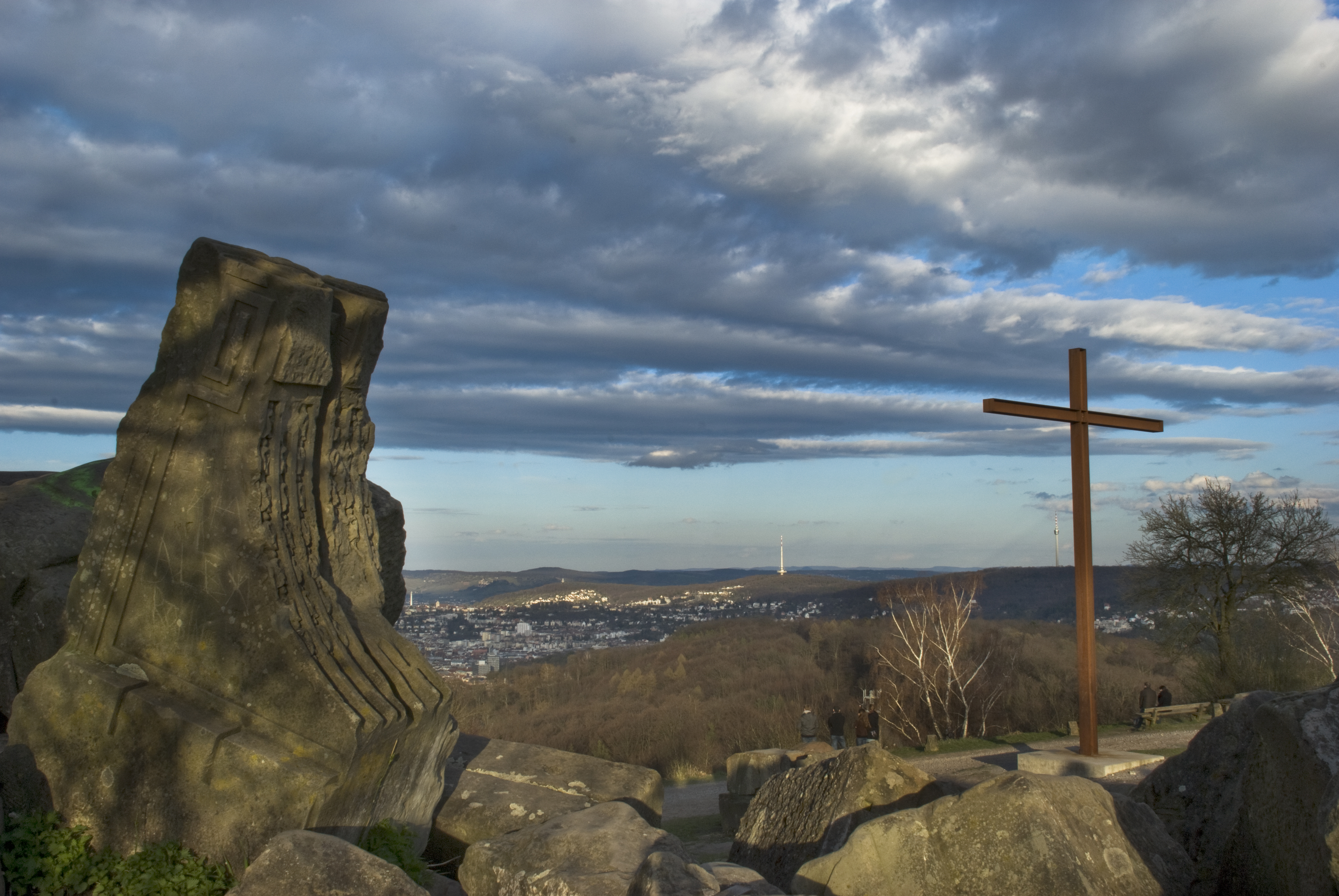
View from the top of the Birkenkopf

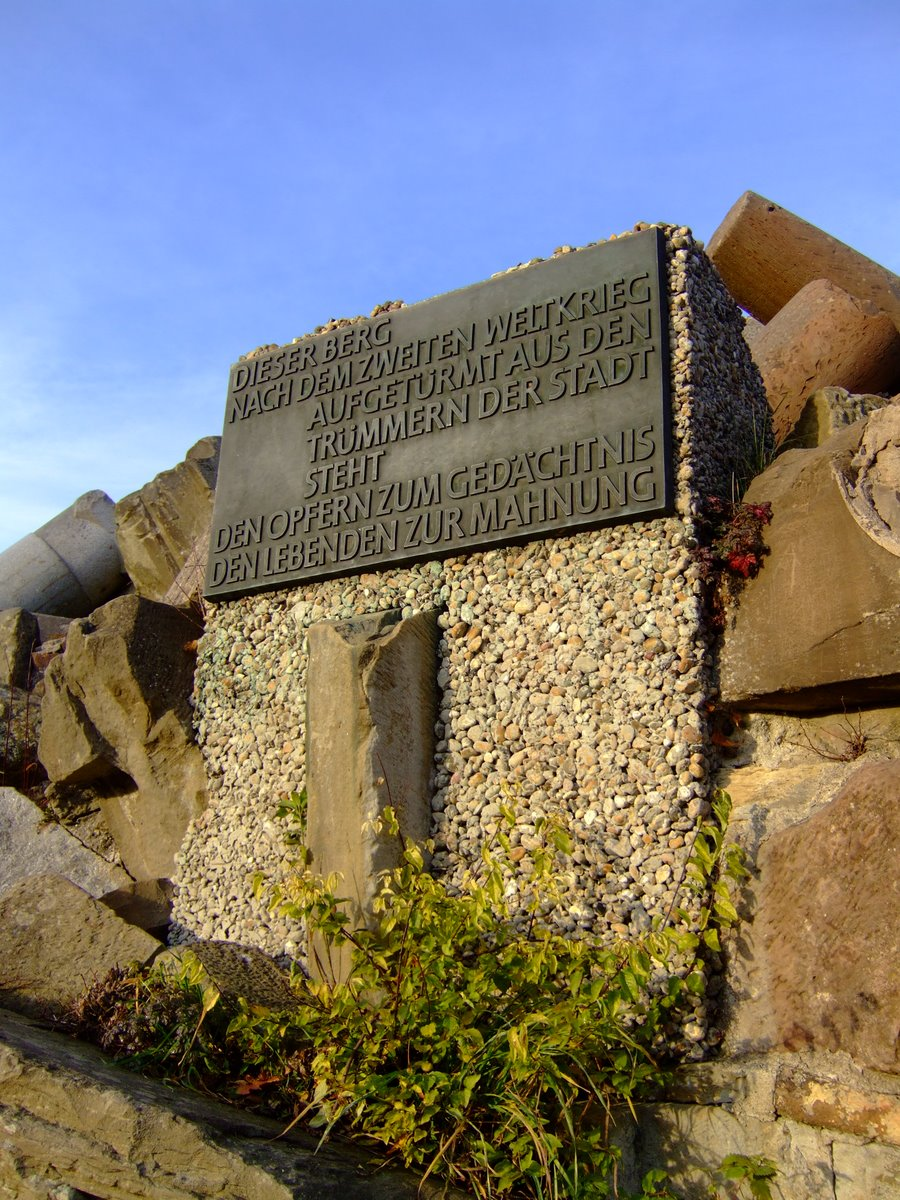
The memorial plaque fixed to one of the rubble pieces

The Birkenkopf (German pronunciation: [ˈbɪʁkn̩ˌkɔp͡f]) is a prominent hill in Stuttgart, Germany. At an elevation of 511m, is almost 260m higher than city centre. It is in part a Schuttberg, an artificial hill built from the ruins and rubble from World War II.

During the war, 53 Allied bombing missions destroyed over 45% of Stuttgart, and nearly the entire city center. Between 1953 and 1957, 1.5 million cubic meters of rubble were cleared and moved to the hill, which resulted in an increase in height of around 40 meters. At the summit there are many recognizable facades from ruined buildings. The locals colloquially call the Birkenkopf "Monte Scherbelino", which roughly translates as "Mount Shards" but in an expression alluding to Italian. One of the pieces of rubble has a plaque attached to it, which says: Dieser Berg nach dem Zweiten Weltkrieg aufgetürmt aus den Trümmern der Stadt steht den Opfern zum Gedächtnis den Lebenden zur Mahnung. This translates roughly as: This mountain, after World War II piled up from the ruins of the city, stands as a memorial to the victims and a reminder to the living.

From the summit the whole city center can be seen, and on a clear day the view extends to the Swabian Alb, to the Black Forest, and the lowlands of Württemberg. On the summit there is a steel cross, which in 2003 replaced the original 1953 wooden cross. In the summer, early morning services are held here on Sundays.
