= Bombing of Frankfurt in World War II =

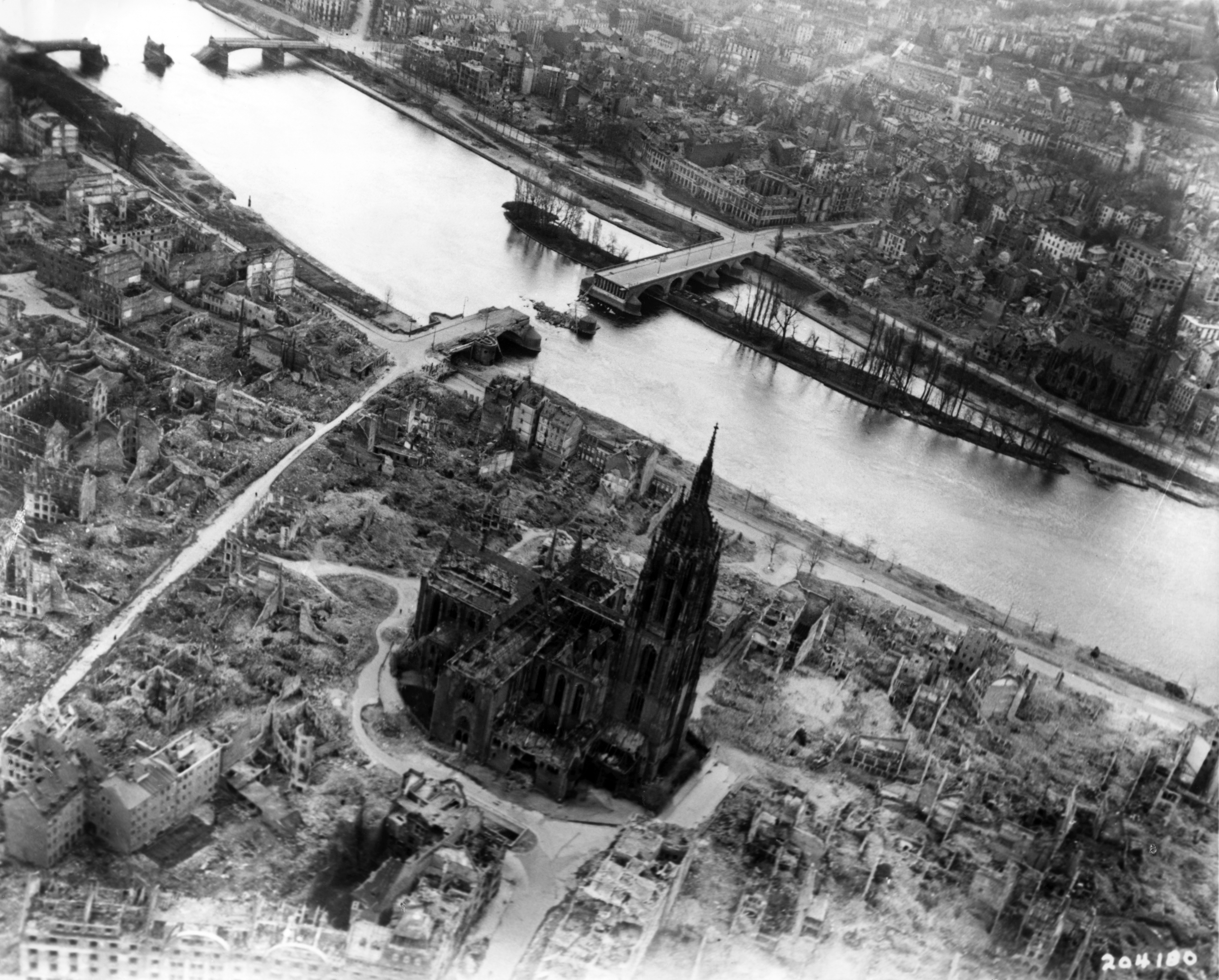
Bomb damage near Frankfurt Cathedral included 2 bridges (May 1945).

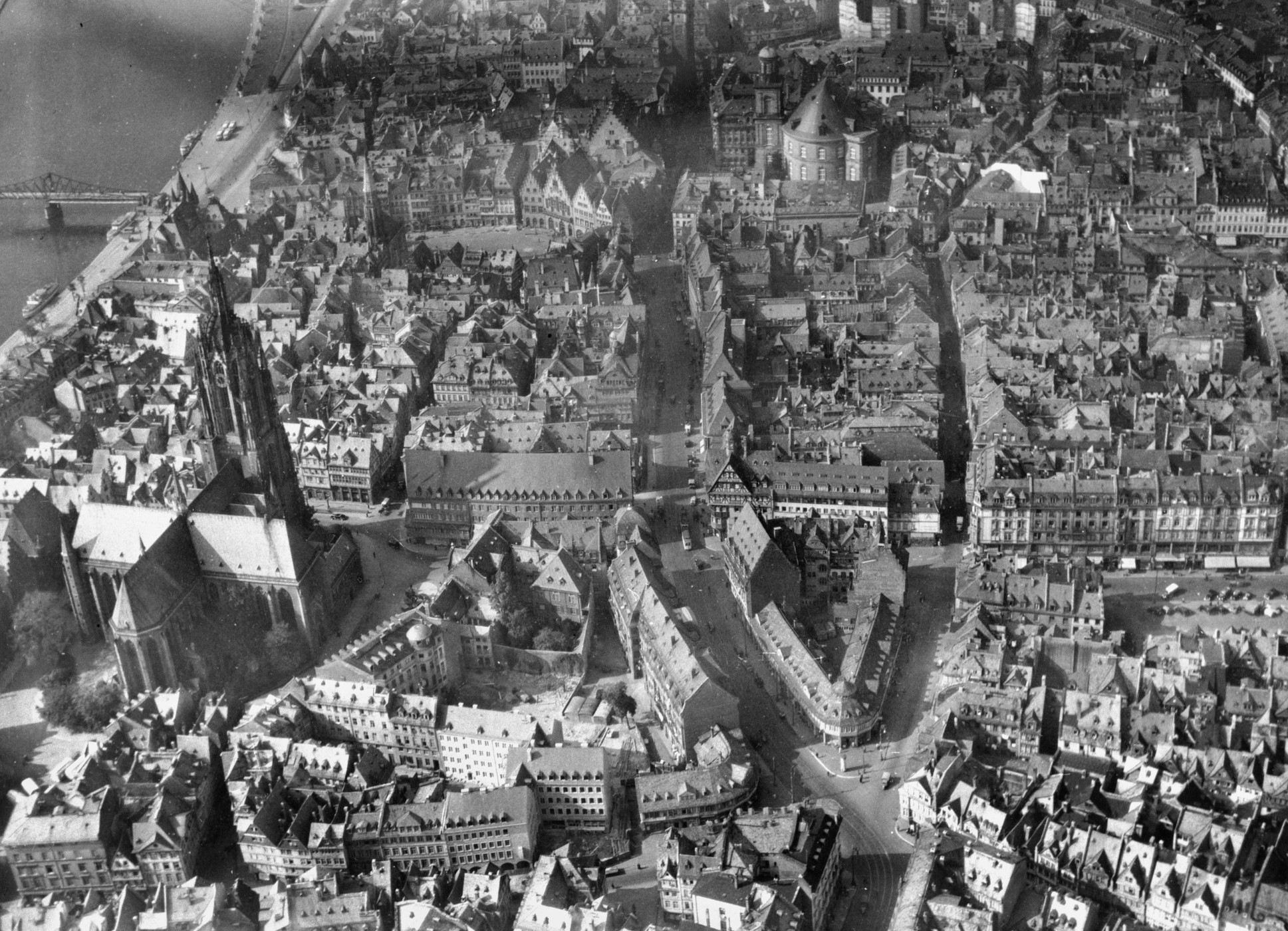
The old City of Frankfurt in 1942 before its destruction

Bombing of Frankfurt by the Allies of World War II killed about 5,500 residents and destroyed the largest half-timbered historical city centre in Germany. The Eighth Air Force dropped 12,197 tons of explosives on the city.

In the 1939–45 period the Royal Air Force (RAF) dropped 15,696 long tons (15,948 t) of bombs on Frankfurt.

Post-war reconstruction generally used modern architecture, and a few landmark buildings were rebuilt in a simple historical style. The first building to be rebuilt was the 1789 Paulskirche (St. Paul's Church).

Chronology
Date	Event
1942-12-02	Frankfurt was unsuccessfully bombed when bad weather prevented crews from hearing Sqn Ldr S. P. Daniels' on the standard-frequency radio equipment in the 1st Master Bomber mission (proposed by Air-Vice Marshal Don Bennett on 22 December 1942—preceding the Operation Chastise MB by 6 months.)
1943-10-04/05	155 Boeing B-17 from the 1st Bombardment Wing targeted the Vereinigte Deutsche Metallwerke (United German Metalworks) in Heddernheim Frankfurt is bombed by 402 British bombers – 162 Avro Lancaster, 170 Handley Page Halifax as well as 70 Short Stirling – and 3 USAAF B-17 participated.
1944-01-29	Mission 24 daylight bombing of Frankfurt killed Princess Marie Alexandra of Baden and seven other women aid workers sheltering with her.
1944-02-04	The 303 BG bombed the Frankfurt city area using PFF.
1944-02-11	The 303 BG attacked Frankfurt
1944-03-02	The 303 BG targeted Frankfurt's V.K.F. (Vereinigte Kugellagerfabriken) ball bearing plant, followed by the Berlin Erkner ball bearing works on 03-03 and 03-08.
1944-03-22	A night raid destroyed the old part of Frankfurt and killed over 1000 inhabitants, and the east port suffered major damage. The Municipal Library was hit during the air raid, destroying its Cairo Genizah document collection and lists of the collection.
1944-09-12	RAF Bomber Command dropped 400,000 incendiary bombs on the industrial areas of Frankfurt, Germany. .
1944-12-22/23; 1945-01-08/09	De Havilland Mosquitos raided Frankfurt during the Battle of Berlin (air).

== See also ==
- Post-war reconstruction of Frankfurt
