= Volkspark Prenzlauer Berg =

Public park and rubble hill in Berlin, Germany

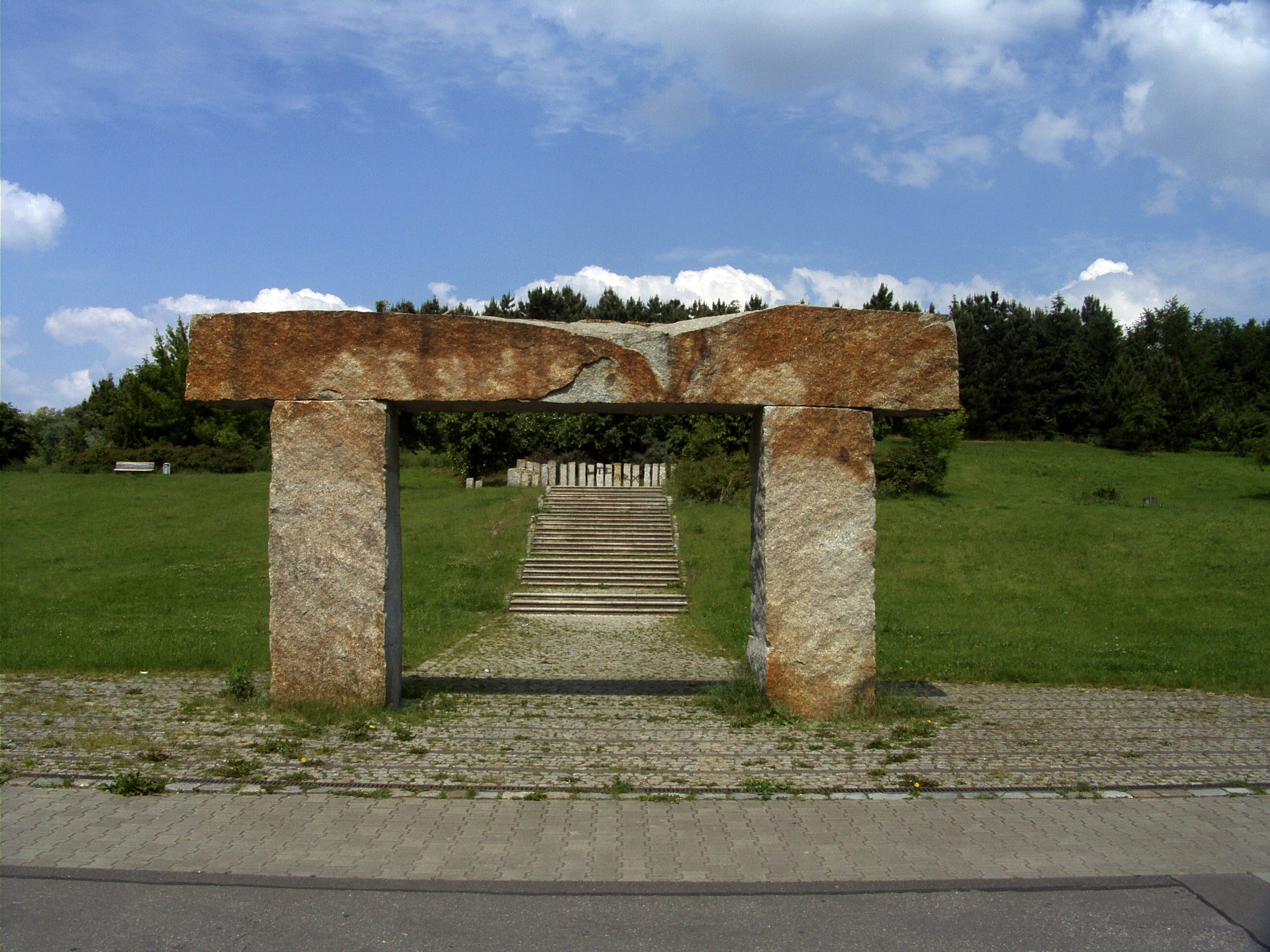
- Entrance to the park at Oderbruchstraße (historically the Oderbruchkippe)
- Interactive map of Volkspark Prenzlauer Berg
- Type: Urban park
- Location: Prenzlauer Berg, Pankow, Berlin, Germany
- Coordinates: 52°32′11.9″N 13°27′44.1″E
- Area: about 29 ha
- Elevation: up to ~91 m
- Created: 1969 (inaugurated as a public park)
- Status: Open all year

Volkspark Prenzlauer Berg is a public park in the Prenzlauer Berg quarter of the Pankow borough in Berlin, Germany. Laid out over a landscaped rubble hill (Schuttberg) historically called the Oderbruchkippe (Oderbruch landfill), it covers roughly 29 hectares and consists of planted slopes and plateaus with footpaths, lawns and viewpoints. The area was regraded and planted in the 1960s after serving as a deposition site for post-war building debris cleared from inner-city districts such as Alexanderplatz; the park was inaugurated under its present name in 1969.

== History ==
After the Second World War, construction rubble from heavily damaged central districts was transported by truck and rubble tram to an area on Berlin’s northeastern edge, forming a double-summit dump known administratively as the Oderbruchkippe. By the late 1960s the slopes had been contoured; mid-1967 saw large-scale planting with hardy, predominantly European tree species, and former service routes were adapted as footpaths. The park opened to the public in 1969 as Volkspark Prenzlauer Berg. The site’s origins as a debris landscape have also been the subject of artistic and cultural projects; for example, a 2013 feature discussed found shards and traces from the rubble layers.

== Location ==
The park lies between Süderbrokweg, Sigridstraße, Schneeglöckchenstraße, Maiglöckchenstraße and Oderbruchstraße / Hohenschönhauser Straße, with allotment gardens to the north and post-war housing estates to the south and west. It sits on the boundary between Pankow and Lichtenberg (Fennpfuhl), with convenient access from tram and bus stops along Hohenschönhauser Straße.

== Landscape and use ==
The highest point is about 90–91 meters, making it one of Berlin’s more prominent artificial elevations. The topography accommodates walking and jogging paths, open meadows and winter sledding. A small community vineyard maintained by local enthusiasts (Weingarten Berlin – Berlin Vineyard) cultivates Riesling on a sunny slope within the park.

The mosaic of woodland and meadow supports urban biodiversity and provides local micro-climate benefits; foxes and numerous bird species are regularly observed, and parts of the site have been kept comparatively natural to develop thickets and edge habitats.

== Public art ==
When the area was laid out as a recreational park, the district commissioned several sculptures and created a small public-art trail (Kulturwege [cultural paths]) around key entrances. A long bronze relief frieze by sculptor Birgit Horota runs along the entrance at Maiglöckchenstraße/Oderbruchstraße; it narrates episodes from the district’s history and the park’s creation from wartime rubble. The inscription on the frieze reads: "Aus Trümmerresten des II. Weltkrieges wurde hier ein Berg aufgeschüttet und der Park angelegt". ["From the rubble remnants of the Second World War, a hill was heaped up here and the park laid out".]

Notable works in and around the park include:

- Erwin Damerow, Rodelnde Kinder [Sledding Children] (1972), bronze group on the upper slopes; part of the park's original artistic furnishing.
- Erwin Damerow, Bär [Bear] (1973; cast stone), placed below the Pappelplateau near a path junction.
- Stephan Horota, Vater und Sohn [Father and Son] (1970/71), bronze, formerly at the corner of Maiglöckchenstraße/Hohenschönhauser Straße; the sculpture was stolen in 2012.
- Stephan Horota, Junger Fuchs [Young Fox] (1972), bronze, formerly near the Schneeglöckchenstraße entrance; also stolen in September 2012.
- Werner Stötzer, Sitzender Junge [Seated Boy] (1956), bronze; relocated after 1991 and today sited at the small square by Erich-Weinert-Straße/Hosemannstraße (near the park).
- Birgit Horota, Aus der Entstehungsgeschichte des Parks [From the Park's Creation History] (1971–1973), bronze frieze approximately ten meters long at the Maiglöckchenstraße entrance; by the 2010s much of the surface had been oversprayed.

A memorial to the Kampfgruppen der Arbeiterklasse (a factory-based militia in the GDR, 1953–1989) stood at the south-eastern approach from 1987 until its removal after reunification.

== Maintenance and recent developments ==
In 2025, preparations to repair ageing asphalt paths led to the felling of several storm-damaged or unstable trees; the works form part of a staged programme to rehabilitate routes through the park. Path renovations and the associated removal of a limited number of poplars, robinias and maples were reported in the Berlin press earlier that year.

== Notable incident ==
On 27 February 2024, passers-by discovered a severed human thigh in the park, triggering a large police search; investigators later identified the victim via DNA and appealed for information.

== Gallery ==
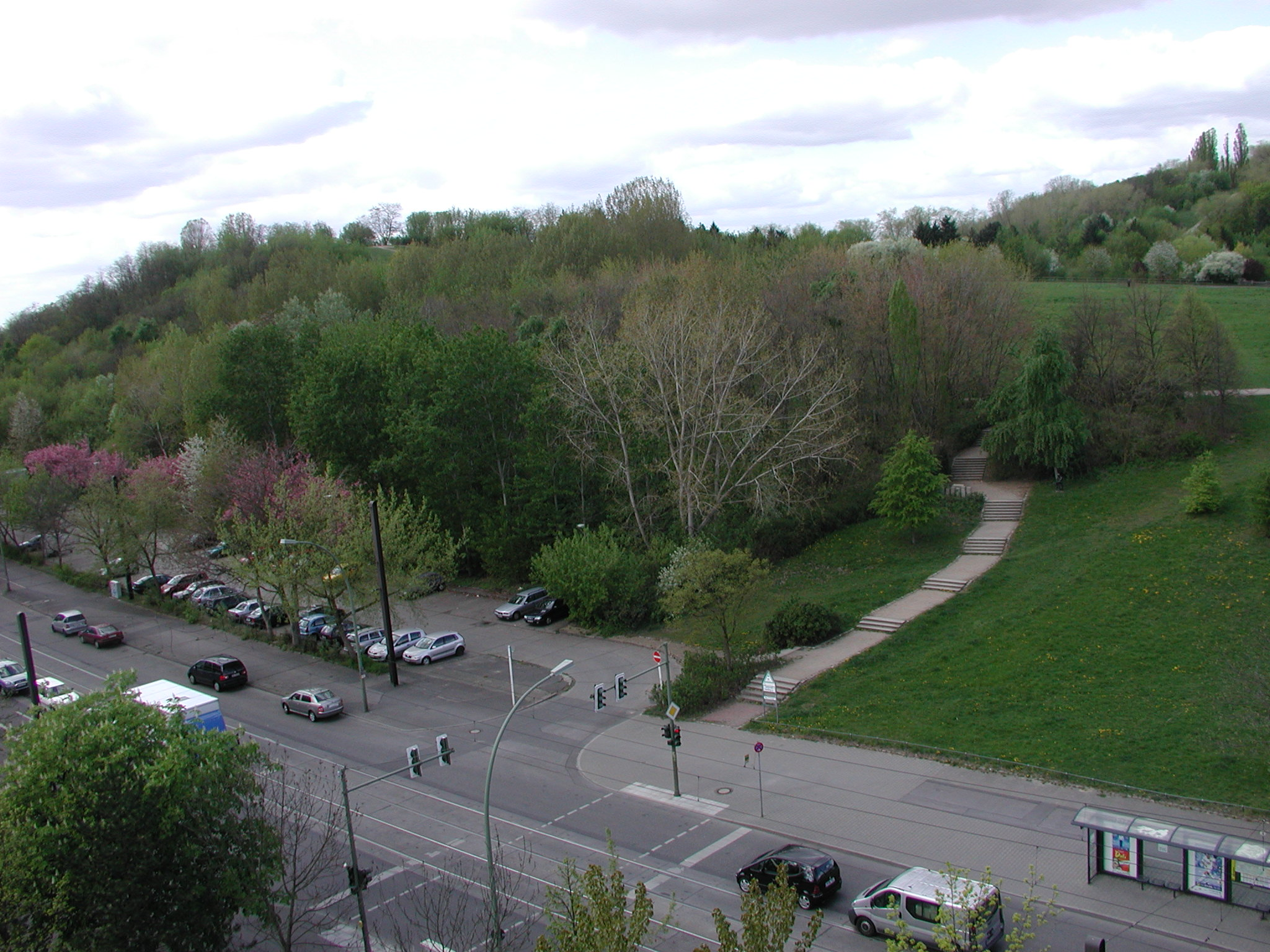
View across one of the hill plateaus (Trümmerberg) in Volkspark Prenzlauer Berg.

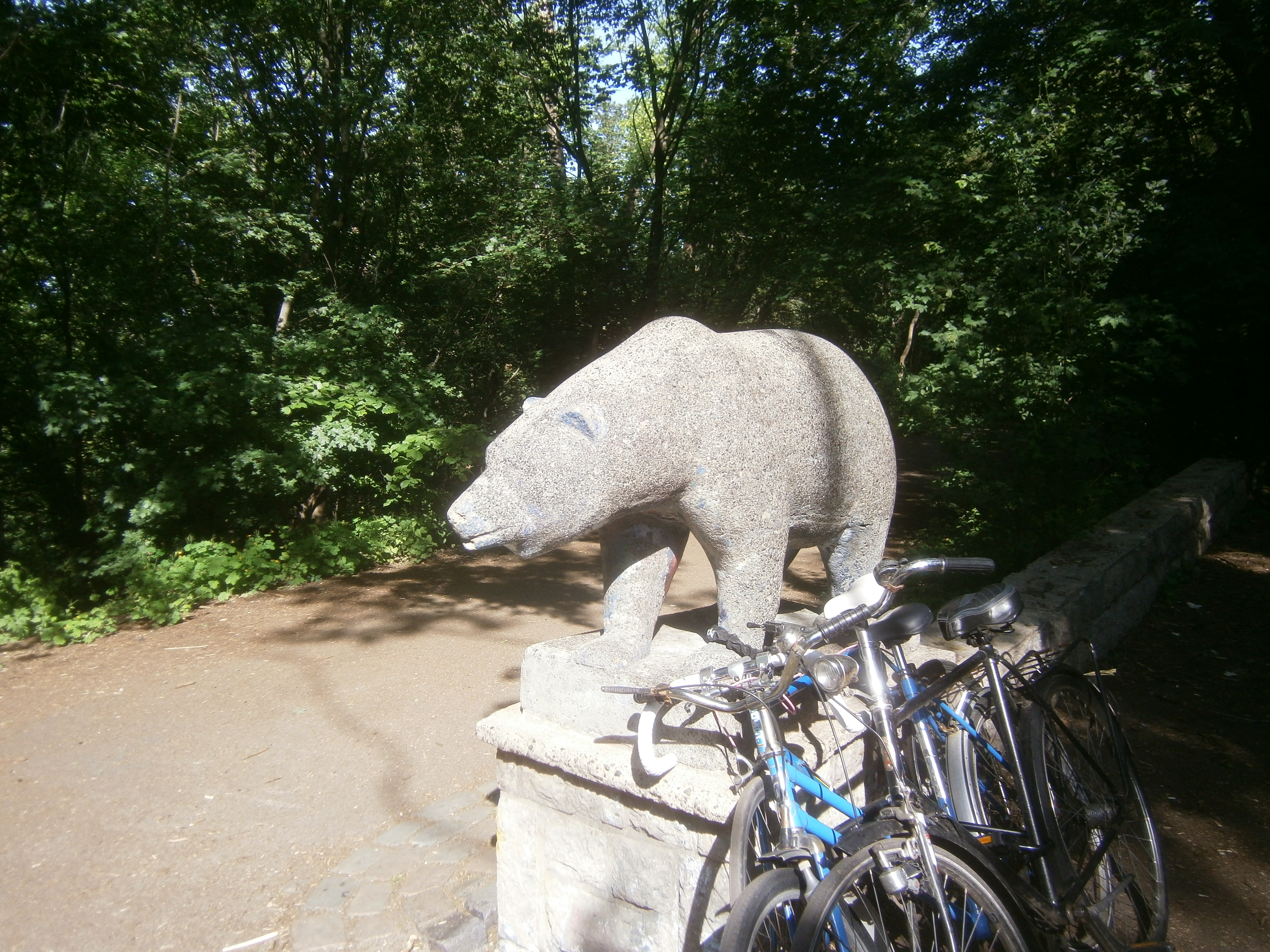
Bär (Erwin Damerow, 1973), one of several pieces of public art in the park.

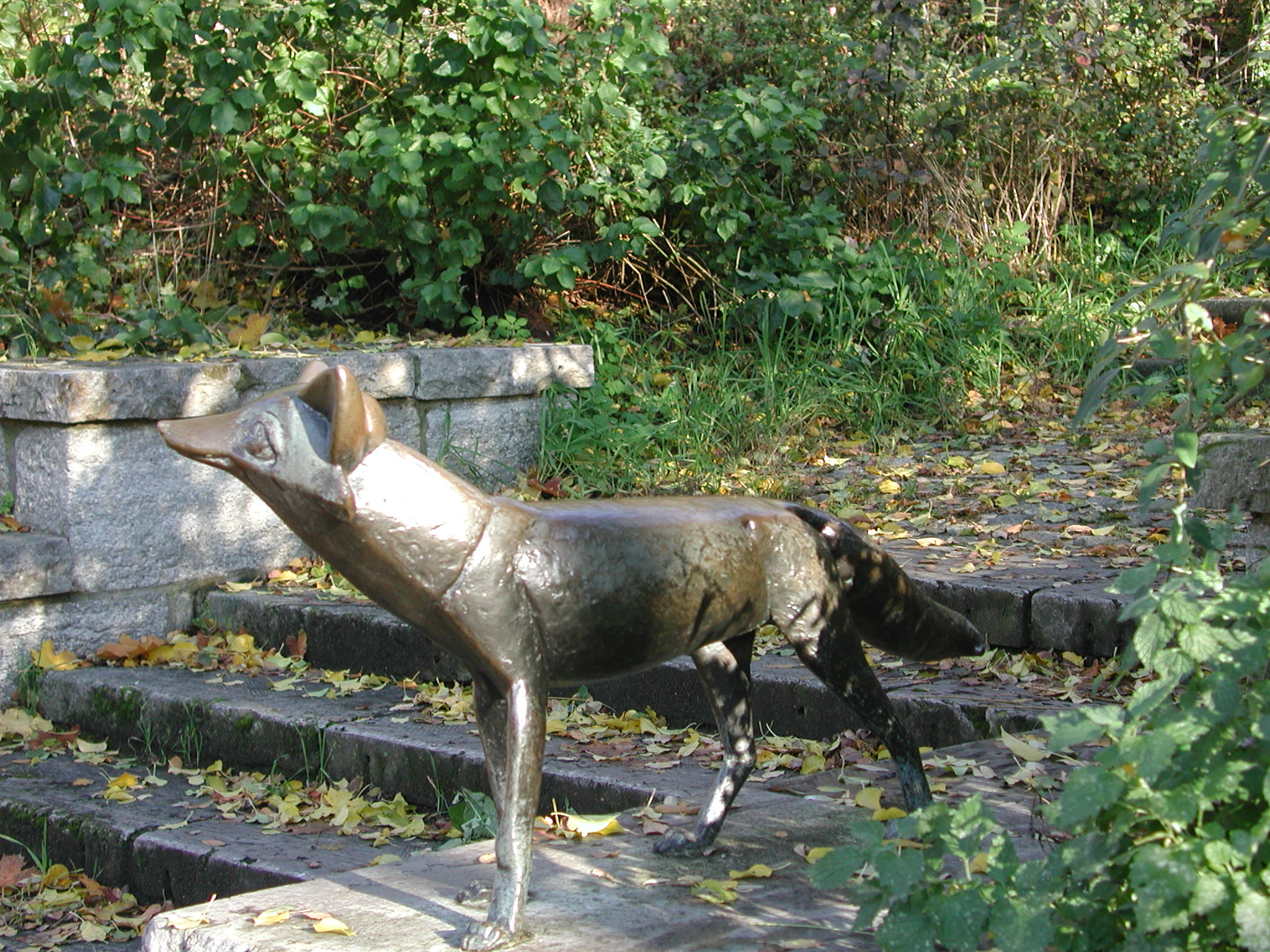
Young Fox (Stephan Horota, 1972), stolen in September 2012.

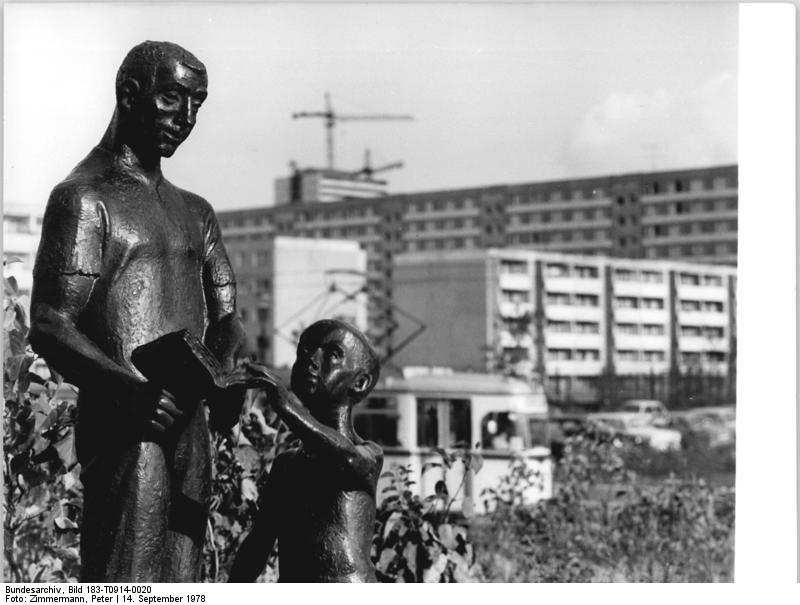
Father and Son (Stephan Horota, 1970/71), stolen in 2012.
