= Schuttberg =

Hill built of rubble or rubbish

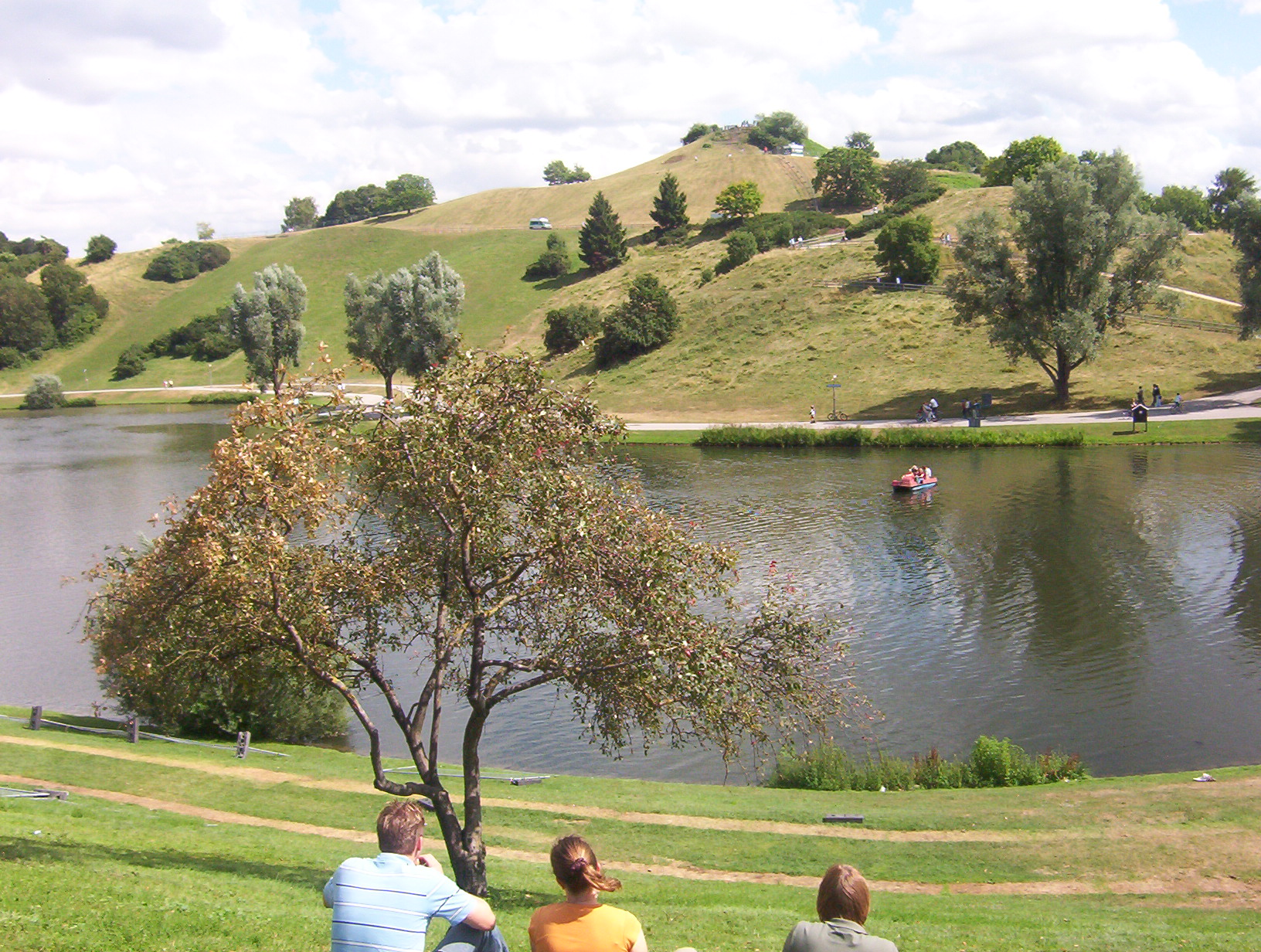
Olympiaberg in Olympiapark, Munich

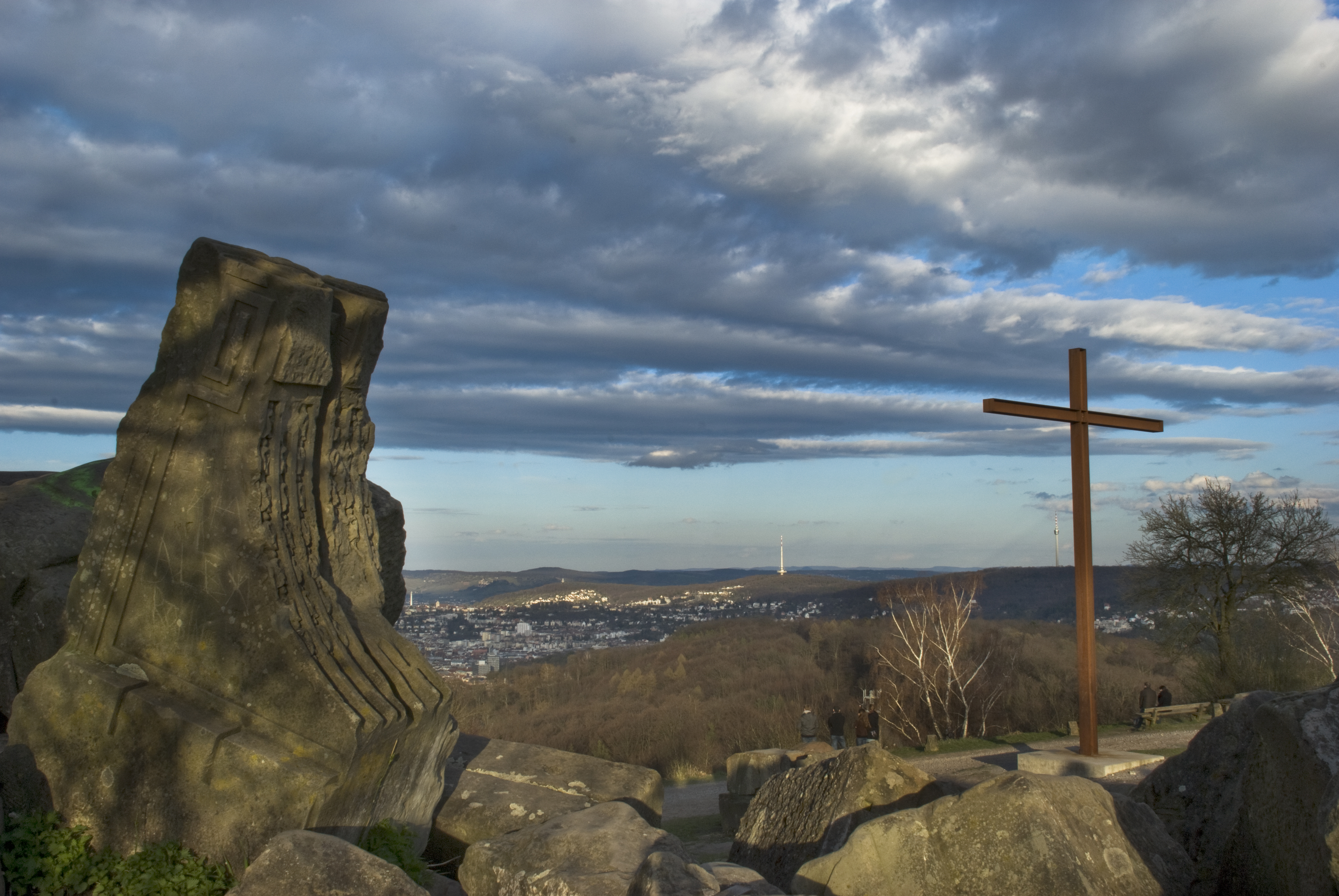
View from top of Birkenkopf in Stuttgart

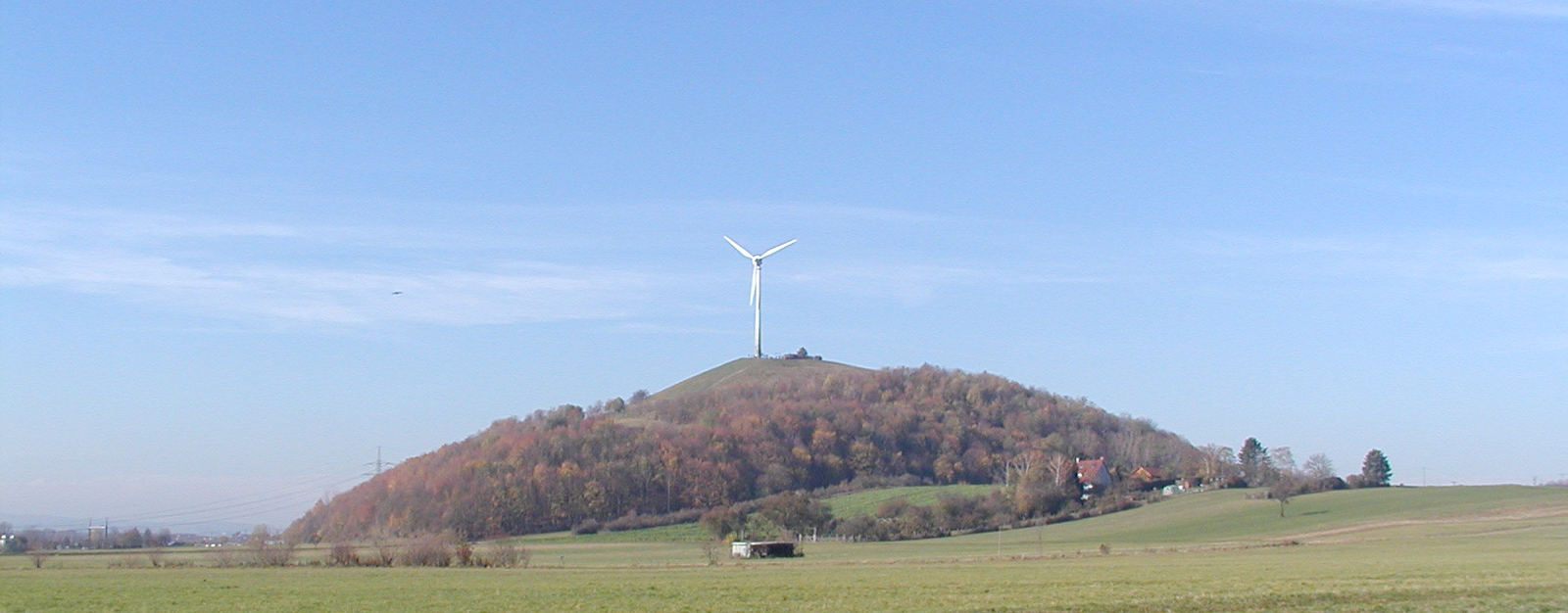
The Grüner Heiner in Stuttgart-Weilimdorf

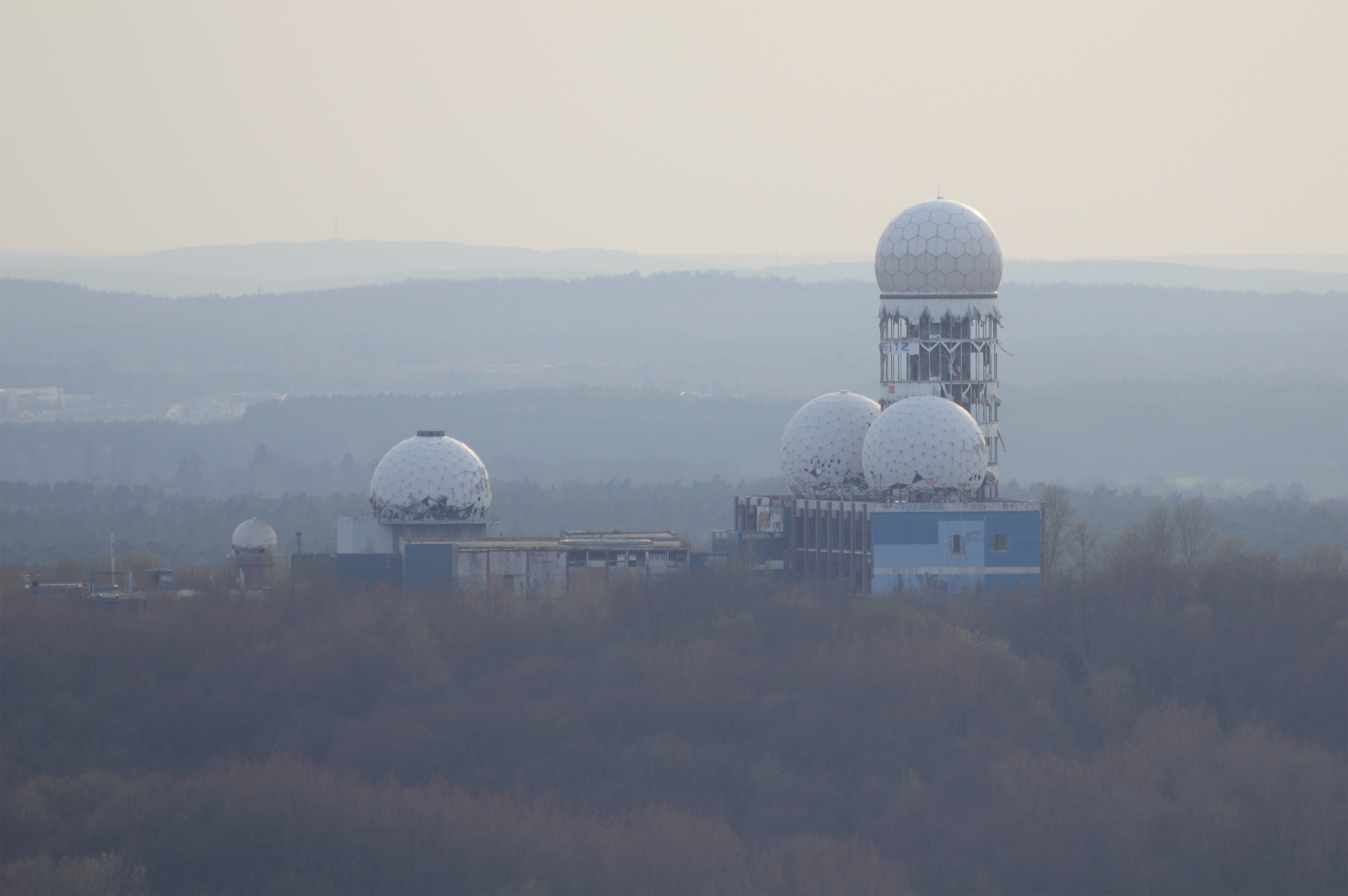
The Teufelsberg in Berlin

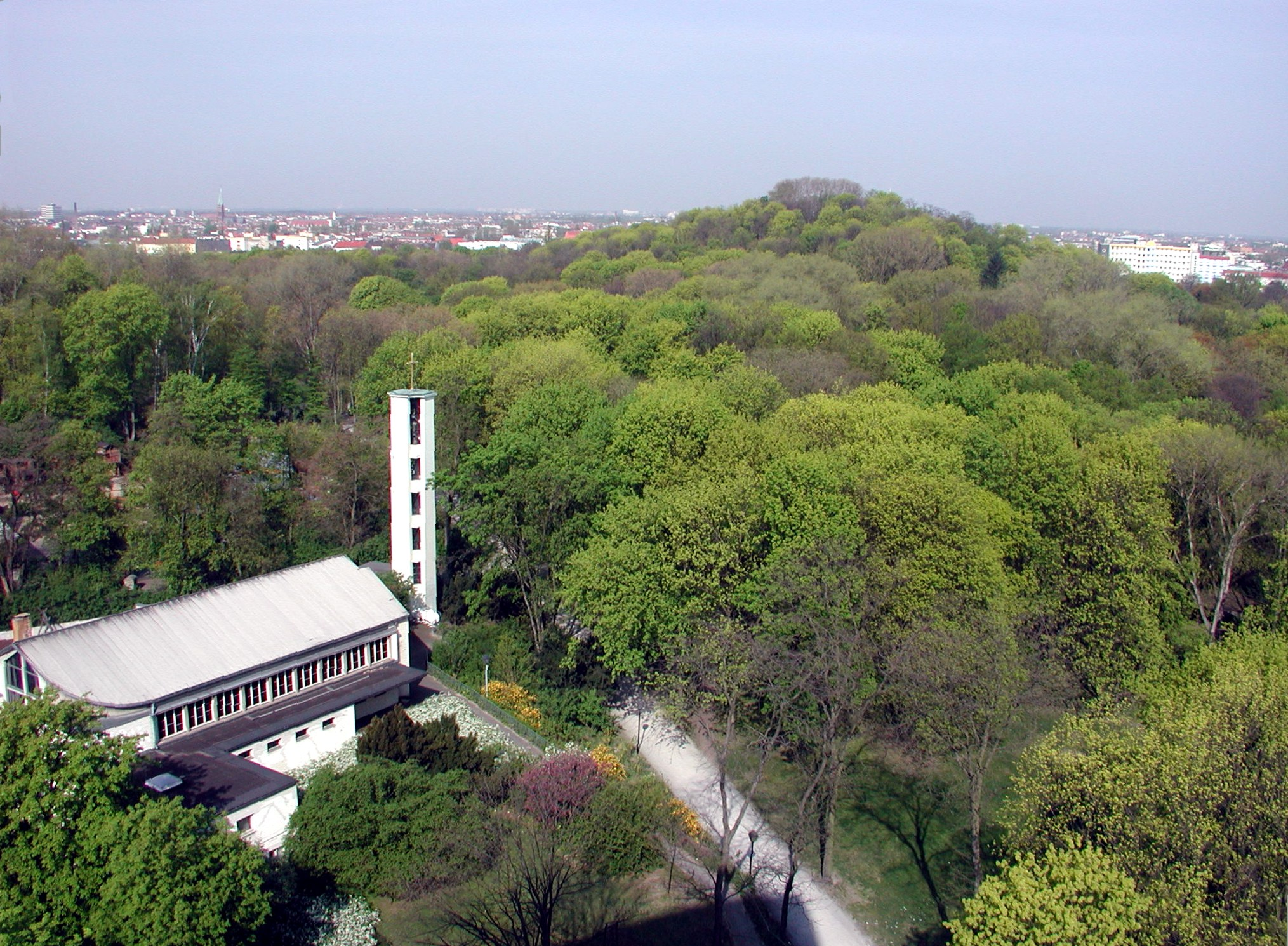
The Humboldthöhe in Berlin

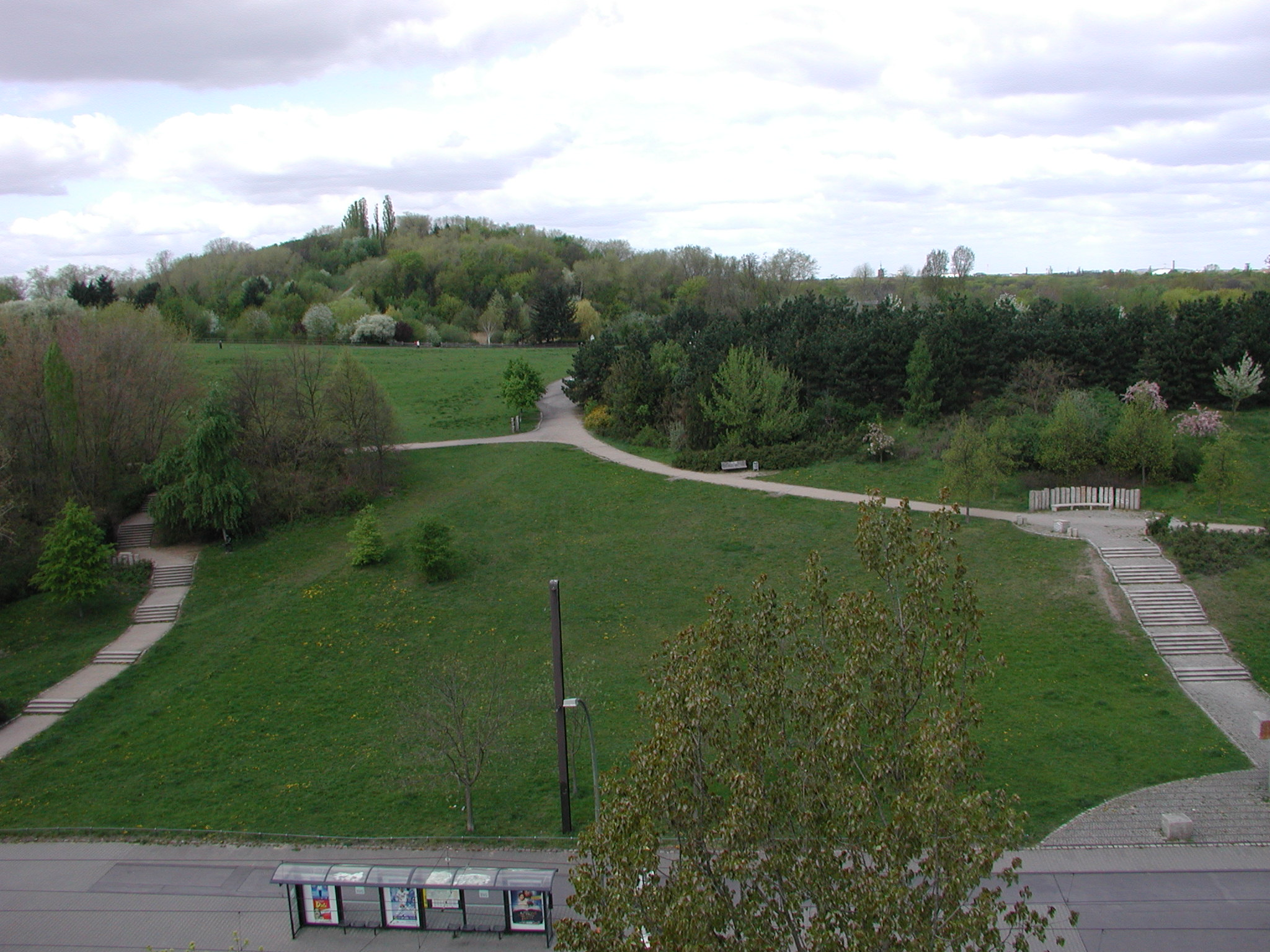
The Volkspark Prenzlauer Berg (Oderbruchkippe) in Berlin

Schuttberg (English: debris hill) is a German term for a mound made of rubble or out of a rubbish heap.

Many were amassed following the extensive damage from strategic bombing during World War II. These types are more specifically termed Trümmerberg (rubble mountain) and are known colloquially by various namesakes such as Mont Klamott (Mount Rag), Monte Scherbelino (Mount Shard), and Scherbelberg (Shard Mountain). Most major cities in Germany have at least one Schuttberg.

== Known Schuttberge ==
Schuttberge in major German cities
| City | Trümmerberg | Elevation (above sea level) | Height (relative) | Volume |
|---|---|---|---|---|
| Berlin | Teufelsberg | 114.7 meters (376 ft) | 55 meters (180 ft) | 12 million m^{3} (420 million cu ft) |
| Berlin | Oderbruchkippe (Volkspark Prenzlauer Berg) | 91 meters (299 ft) | | 3 million m^{3} (110 million cu ft) |
| Berlin | Dörferblick | 86 meters (282 ft) | | |
| Berlin | Humboldthöhe | 85 meters (279 ft) | | |
| Berlin | Großer and Kleiner Bunkerberg (Volkspark Friedrichshain) | 78 meters (256 ft) | 40 meters (130 ft) | 2.5 million m^{3} (88 million cu ft) |
| Berlin | Insulaner | 75 meters (246 ft) | | |
| Berlin | Tempelhofer Marienhöhe | 73 meters (240 ft) | | 0.19 million m^{3} (6.7 million cu ft) |
| Berlin | Rixdorfer Höhe | 68 meters (223 ft) | | |
| Cologne | Herkulesberg | 72.2 meters (237 ft) | approx. 25 meters (82 ft) | |
| Dresden | Trümmerberg in Ostragehege | | | |
| Frankfurt am Main | Monte Scherbelino | 172.5 meters (566 ft) | approx. 47 meters (154 ft) | 10 to 12 million m^{3} (350 to 420 million cu ft) |
| Hannover | Monte Müllo | 122 meters (400 ft) | approx. 65 meters (213 ft) | |
| Leipzig | Fockeberg | 153 meters (502 ft) | approx. 40 meters (130 ft) | |
| Mönchengladbach | Rheydter Höhe | 133 meters (436 ft) | 64 meters (210 ft) | |
| Munich | Olympiaberg | 567 meters (1,860 ft) | 50 meters (160 ft) | |
| Munich | Luitpoldhügel | 540 meters (1,770 ft) | 37 meters (121 ft) | |
| Munich | Neuhofener Berg | | | 2.5 million m^{3} (88 million cu ft) |
| Nuremberg | Silberbuck | 356 meters (1,168 ft) | 38 meters (125 ft) | 5.53 million m^{3} (195 million cu ft) (approx. 0.66 million m^{3} (23 million cu ft) below the water level of Silbersee) |
| Pforzheim | Wallberg | 418 meters (1,371 ft) | 40 meters (130 ft) | 1.65 million m^{3} (58 million cu ft) |
| Stuttgart | Birkenkopf | 511 meters (1,677 ft) | 40 meters (130 ft) | 1.5 million m^{3} (53 million cu ft) |
| Stuttgart | Grüner Heiner | 395 meters (1,296 ft) | 70 meters (230 ft) | |

=== Berlin ===
The amount of debris in Berlin is about 15 percent of the total rubble in the whole of Germany.

=== Frankfurt am Main ===
To remove and recycle the rubble the city authorities in the autumn of 1945 created the non-profit Trümmerverwertungsgesellschaft which was tasked with removing the rubble and recycling it. Initially the removed rubble was piled up on a rubble mountain called Monte Scherbelino, before the material was recycled and processed to such an extent that by 1964 the pile of rubble had completely disappeared.

=== Nuremberg ===
Silberbuck is in the Dutzendteich recreation area and former Reichsparteitagsgelände. The Silbersee is at the base of the disposal. The lake is contaminated with various toxic substances. Although swimming in the water is prohibited, about 50 people have lost their lives in the water since the end of World War II.
