= Rheydter Höhe =

Trümmerberg in Monchengladbach, Germany

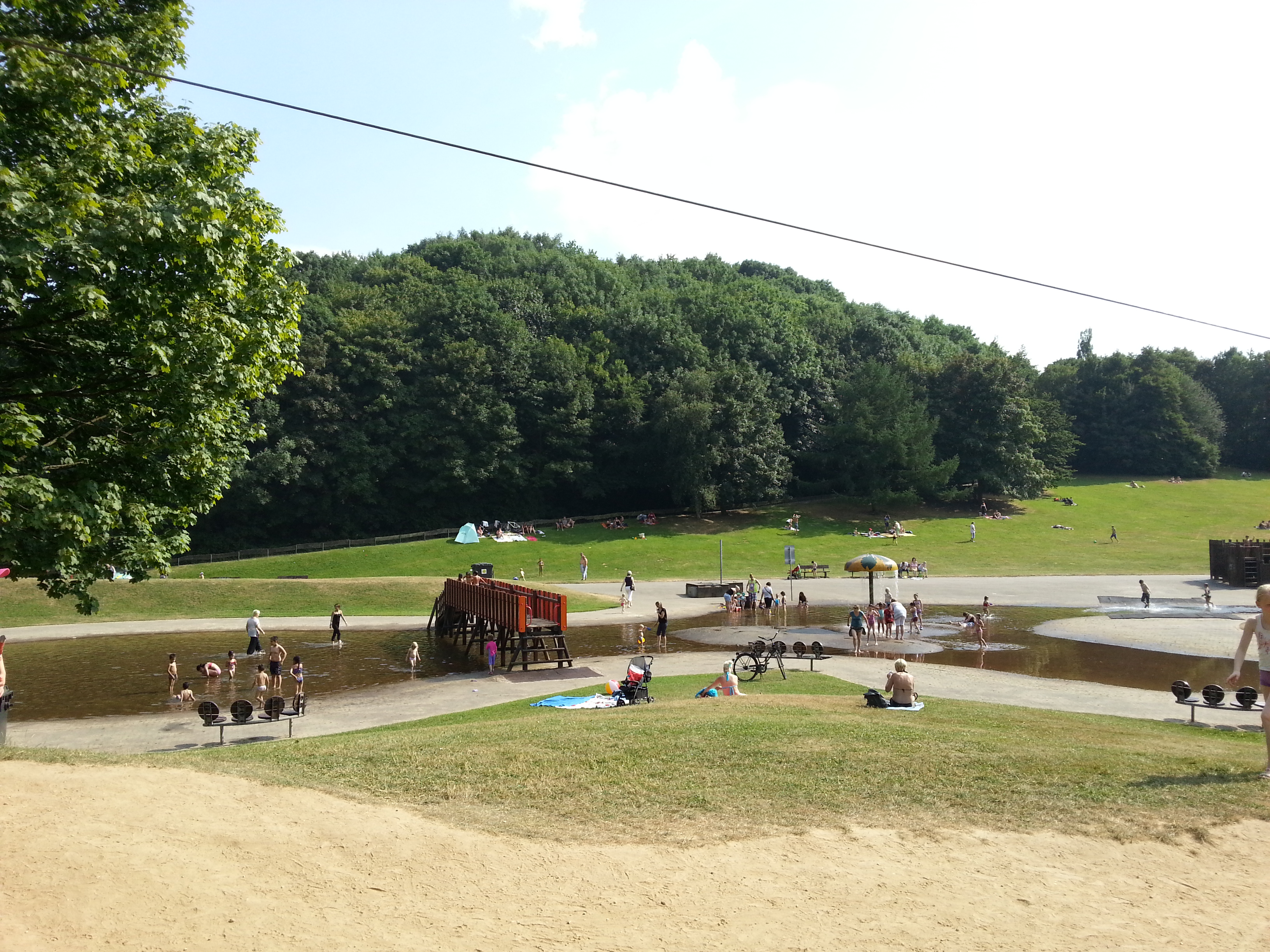
- The Rheydter Höhe also called the Müllberg

Highest point
- Elevation: 133 m above sea level (NN) (436 ft)
- Listing: Höchste Erhebung im Stadtgebiet von Mönchengladbach
- Coordinates: 51°09′25″N 6°24′25″E

Geography

Geology
- Rock age: 1950s
- Mountain type: Schuttberg

The Rheydter Höhe is a Trümmerberg in the Mönchengladbach district of Pongs in the south of the city. Locally the hill, which is made of rubble, is known as Monte Clamotte ("Mount Rubble") or Rheydter Müllberg (the "Rheydt Rubbish Tip"). The plateau of the small hill is 133 m above NN high, making it the highest point in the borough. Measuring 64 m from foot to summit, it is also the highest Trümmerberg in Germany.

The Rheydter Höhe ("Rheydt Hill") was created in 1945 from rubble left behind by the bombing of the towns of Mönchengladbach and Rheydt, which left 65% of the two towns in ruins. During the 1950s, great quantities of domestic rubbish were dumped on the Trümmerberg. In order to enable plants and trees to grow, a layer of humus, between one and two metres thick, laid over the household rubbish. During the 1990s, this resulted in poison gas emissions from the rubble, of which nothing can be seen today. However, about 30 metres below the plateau, which doubles as a viewing point, individual pieces of plastic bags can be seen on the sides of the footpath, which have been exposed by rainwater over time.

At the northern foot of the Trümmerberg is a water play park, a pond and the Rheydt municipal forest with barbecue sites, a minigolf course, a café and facilities for other activities.

The road of Dahlener Straße (one of the main transport axes of the town, linking Rheydt with Rheindahlen) and the A 61 motorway run south and west of the Rheydter Höhe respectively.
