= Reconstruction of Germany =

Rebuilding of Germany after World War II

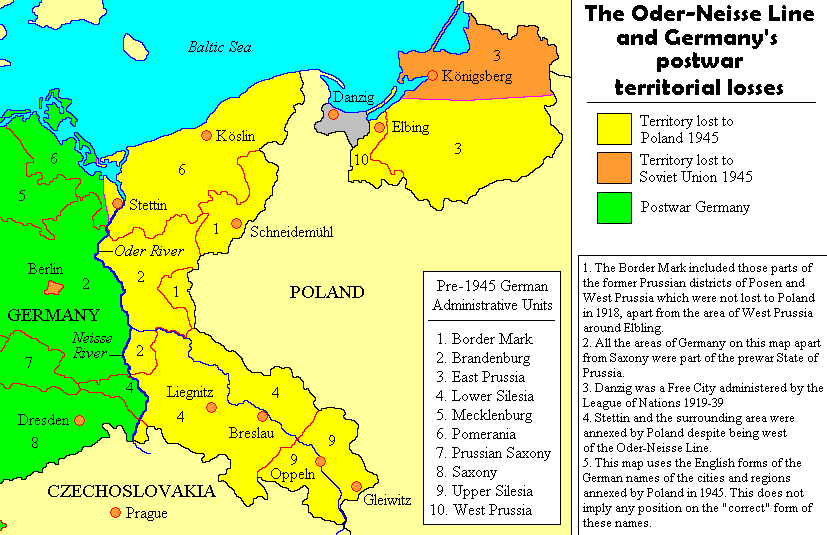
Map showing the Oder–Neisse line and pre-war German territory ceded to Poland and the Soviet Union. (click to enlarge)

The reconstruction of Germany was the process of rebuilding Germany after the destruction endured during World War II. Germany suffered heavy losses during the war, both in lives and industrial power. Approximately 6.9 to 7.5 million Germans died, representing roughly 8.5 percent of the German population and a significant portion (~10%) of total World War II casualties estimated at 70 to 85 million people. The country's cities were severely damaged from heavy bombing in the closing chapters of the war and agricultural production was only 35 percent of what it was before the war.

== Potsdam Conference ==
At the Potsdam Conference, the victorious Western Allies ceded roughly 25 percent of Germany's pre-Anschluss territory to Poland and the Soviet Union. The German population in this area was expelled, together with the Germans of the Sudetenland and the German populations scattered throughout the rest of Eastern Europe. Between 1.5 and 2 million are said to have died in the process, depending on source. As a result, the population density grew in the "new" Germany that remained after the dismemberment.

As agreed at Potsdam, an attempt was made to convert Germany into a pastoral and agricultural nation, allowing only light industry. Many factories were dismantled as reparations or were simply destroyed as proposed in the Morgenthau Plan. Millions of German prisoners of war were for several years used as forced labor, by both the Allies and the Soviet Union.

== Reconstruction ==
As soon as 1945, the Allied forces worked heavily on removing Nazi influence from Germany in a process dubbed as "denazification".

By mid-1947, the success of denazification and the start of the Cold War led to a re-consideration of policy, as the Germans were seen as possible allies in the contest, and it was becoming clear that the economic recovery of Europe was dependent on the reactivation of German industry. With the repudiation of the U.S. occupation directive JCS 1067 in July 1947, the Western Allies were able to start planning for the introduction of a currency reform to halt the rampant inflation. This type of action to help the German economy had been prohibited by the directive.

In 1947, the Marshall Plan, initially known as the "European Recovery Program" was initiated. In the years 1947–1952, some $13 billion of economic and technical assistance – equivalent to around $140 billion in 2017 – were allocated to Western Europe. Despite protests from many beneficiaries, the Marshall Plan, although in the less generous form of loans, was in 1949 extended to also include the newly formed West Germany. In the years 1949–1952, West Germany received loans which totaled $1.45 billion, equivalent to around $19 billion in 2024.

The country subsequently began a slow but continuous improvement of its standard of living, with the export of local products, a reduction in unemployment, increased food production, and a reduced black market.

In 1948, the Deutsche Mark replaced the occupation currency as the currency of the Western occupation zones, leading to their eventual economic recovery.

By 1950, the UK and France were finally induced to follow the U.S. lead, and stop the dismantling of German heavy industry. The country's economic recovery under the newly formed democratic government was, once it was permitted, swift and effective. During the mid-1950s, the unemployment rate in Germany was so low that it led to an influx of Italian and other immigrants into the country's labor force. Germany's economy continued to improve until the 1973 oil crisis.

== Rehabilitation milestones ==
- In 1946, the US Secretary of State (foreign minister) makes the speech Restatement of Policy on Germany, repudiating the Morgenthau Plan policies.
- In 1947, the JCS 1067 is rescinded.
- In 1948, the Deutsche Mark replaces the almost worthless Reichsmark in the Allied western occupation zones, initiating the start of economic recovery in western Germany.
- In 1949, West Germany is formed from the Western occupation zones, with the exception of the Saarland.
- In 1949, the Marshall Plan is extended to include West Germany.
- In 1950, the dismantling of West German heavy industry ends.
- In 1955, the military occupation of West Germany ends.
- In 1955, NATO, which was formed in 1949, allows West Germany to join.
- In 1957, France returns the Saarland to West Germany.
- In 1957, West Germany is one of the founding nations of the European Economic Community.
- In 1973, West Germany joins the United Nations (formed in 1945).
- In 1990, a unified Germany is allowed by the Allies of World War II to become fully sovereign after signing the Treaty on the Final Settlement with Respect to Germany.

== See also ==
- GARIOA
- Allied plans for German industry after World War II
- Restatement of Policy on Germany
- Post-war reconstruction of Frankfurt
- The President's Economic Mission to Germany and Austria
- Vergangenheitsbewältigung
- Wirtschaftswunder
- Jus post bellum
- Operation Paperclip
- Morgenthau Plan
- Denazification
