= Silbersee (Langenhagen) =

Lake in Langenhagen, Germany

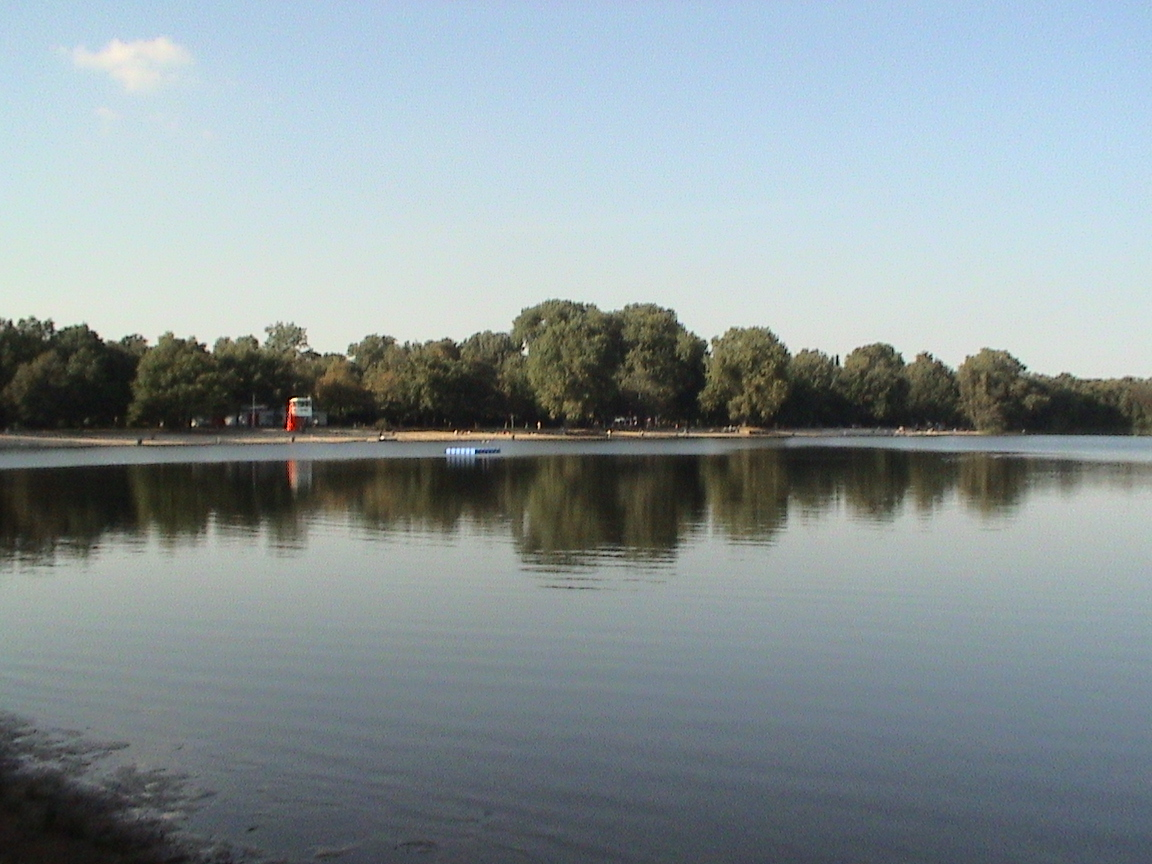

- Location within Lower Saxony
- Location: Langenhagen, Lower Saxony
- Coordinates: 52°25′50″N 9°45′34″E
- Basin countries: Germany
- Max. length: 0.38 km (0.24 mi)
- Max. width: 0.23 km (0.14 mi)
- Max. depth: 20 m (66 ft)

Silbersee is an artificial lake in eastern Langenhagen, Lower Saxony, Germany. Built between 1934 and 1935 during the construction of the nearby motorway, it was converted from a quarry pond to a lake in the 1960s. The lake has long sandy beaches, including a dog beach, and playgrounds for children.

Its name, which means "silver lake", is associated with the nearby Langenhagen Airport during World War II. Silbersee was so-named by pilots who saw the silvery reflection of their aircraft shimmering on its surface.
