= Grüner Heiner =

Artificial mountain in Germany

Coordinates: 48°49′51″N 9°05′50″E

Highest point
- Elevation: 395 m (1,296 ft)

Geography
- Location: Baden-Württemberg, Germany

Grüner Heiner is a mountain of Baden-Württemberg, Germany. It is a Schuttberg, an artificial hill built from the ruins and rubble from World War II.
