= Walter Kolb =

German politician of the SPD (1902–1956)

Walter Eugen Kolb
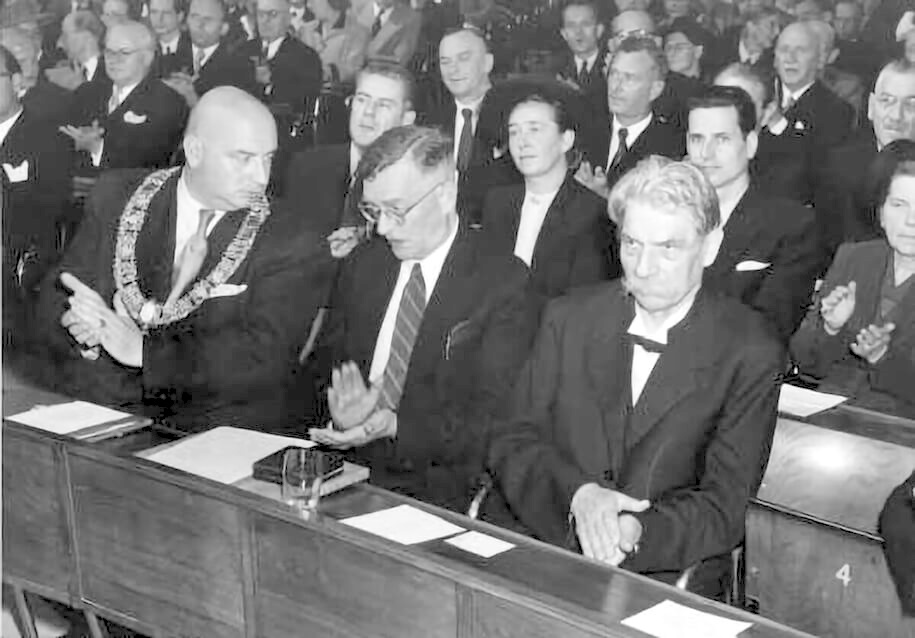
- Walter Kolb (left) in 1949 together with Adolf Grimme & Albert Schweitzer at the St. Paul's Church, Frankfurt am Main

Mayor of Frankfurt
- In office 1 August 1946 – 20 September 1956
- Preceded by: Kurt Blaum
- Succeeded by: Werner Bockelmann

Personal details
- Born: 22 January 1902 Bonn, German Empire
- Died: 20 September 1956 (aged 54) Frankfurt, West Germany
- Party: Social Democratic Party of Germany (SPD)

Walter Eugen Kolb (22 January 1902 - 20 September 1956) was a German politician of the Social Democratic Party (SPD) who served as Mayor of Frankfurt from 1946 until his death in 1956. He was the first Mayor of Frankfurt to be elected after the end of World War II.

== Early life and education ==
Kolb was born in 1902 as the son of businessman Eduard Kolb and forester's daughter Celementine Kolb (née Stichter). The family lived in Bonn, where Kolb studied at Beethoven Gymnasium and later at the University of Bonn, where he studied law. In 1920 Kolb joined the SPD whilst a student at Bonn. In 1922 he formed the Republican Student Cartel, a student organisation promoting liberal ideas and opposition to antisemitism. in 1923 Kolb was arrested by the French authorities who were occupying the Rhineland, during which time he completed his first state exams. In 1924, Kolb took up his first position as a judicial clerk, and he moved to Berlin in 1931 to work in the Ministry of Agriculture. He entered politics in 1932, becoming the "Landrat" (district administrator) of the Herrschaft Schmalkalden district in Hesse.

== Activities in Nazi Germany ==
Due to his criticism of National Socialism, Kolb was removed from his political duties; his removal was official justified by "cost-cutting". Kolb initially sought to emigrate abroad but decided against the idea. He opened a law firm in Bonn, where he defended political prisoners; he was arrested for these activities several times. In 1941, Kolb was drafted into the Wehrmacht. In 1944, he was linked to the Stauffenberg plot to assassinate Hitler and arrested (although in actuality he was not involved in any way). In 1945, Kolb escaped from a prison transport and went into hiding until then end of the war.

== Mayorship ==
After the end of the Second World War, Kolb was the Mayor of Düsseldorf between 1945 and 1946, before being elected as Mayor of Frankfurt on 25 July 1946. Kolb was the first mayor to be elected since the Nazis took power in 1933 (two mayors had been appointed by US forces after the end of the war).

One of Kolb's most important tasks after the war was the reconstruction of Frankfurt, which had been damaged significantly by allied bombing. He initiated the reconstruction of Frankfurt's Old Town, with the rebuilding of the Römer, Frankfurt Cathedral and the Goethe House all occurring under Kolb's leadership. Kolb also sought to revive the Messe Frankfurt and rebuild Frankfurt Airport. Under Kolb several sports associations were founded in Frankfurt, such as the German Football Association and the German Gymnastics Association.

In 1946, Kolb encouraged the intellectuals Max Horkheimer, Theodor W. Adorno and Friedrich Pollock, who had been living in exile in the USA, to return to Frankfurt. After they returned, they re-established the Frankfurt School at Goethe University Frankfurt in 1951. In 1946 Kolb instructed the Frankfurt City Archives to collect files relating to the persecution of Jews during the Nazi era, which gave rise to the Commission for Research into the History of Frankfurt's Jews on 17 May 1961.

Kolb sought to secure Frankfurt as the capital of West Germany, but these efforts failed in 1949, with Bonn eventually becoming the capital.

In 1954, Kolb was elected for a second term as Mayor of Frankfurt. However, at this point, he was suffering from diabetes, and had undergone several heart attacks. He died two years later in 1956, having been Mayor of Frankfurt for ten consecutive years.

In the municipal elections of 1956, held after Kolb's death, the SPD won 54.5% of the vote, the best result in their history.

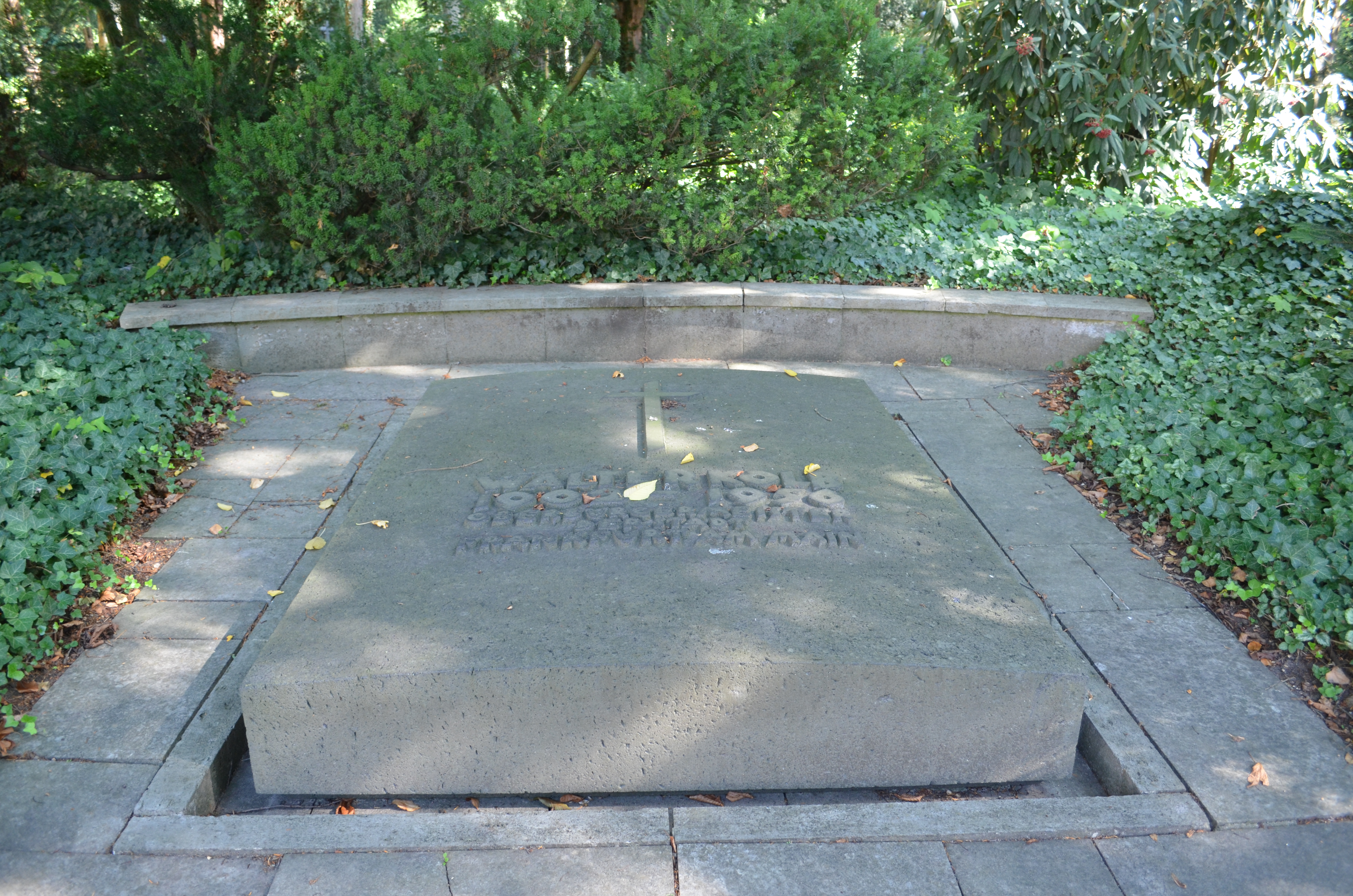
Kolb's grave in Frankfurt Main Cemetery

== Personal life and death ==
Kolb married Anna Maria Elisabeth Trimborn in 1932. The couple had two children, a daughter who died after one day, and a son who was born in 1944 and died aged 17 in 1961.

Kolb died of heart failure on 20 September 1956, aged 54. His coffin was followed by over 100,000 people; Kolb was very popular amongst the Frankfurt populace. He is buried at Frankfurt Main Cemetery.

== Legacy ==
In 1959, the Walter-Kolb-Stiftung was founded, which provides grants to support and encourage further education. In 1960, a school in Unterliederbach was named after Kolb. The Walter Kolb Memorial Prize has been awarded by the Goethe University Frankfurt for outstanding dissertations since 1957.
