= Kurt Blaum =

German politician of the CDU

Kurt Fritz Johannes Blaum

Mayor of Frankfurt
- In office 2 April 1945 – 25 July 1946
- Preceded by: Wihelm Hollbach
- Succeeded by: Walter Kolb

Mayor of Hanau
- In office 29 December 1921 – 1 April 1933

Personal details
- Born: 10 April 1884 Strasbourg, Alsace-Lorraine, German Empire
- Died: 26 November 1970 (aged 86) Bad Homburg, Hesse, West Germany

Kurt Fritz Johannes Blaum (10 April 1884 – 26 November 1970) was a German politician who served in political roles both before and after the Second World War; he was Mayor of Hanau between 1921 and 1933, and Mayor of Frankfurt between 1945 and 1946.

== Early life and education ==
Blaum was born in Strasbourg, Alsace–Lorraine, in what is today France, to head teacher Rudolf Albert Valentin Blaum and his wife, Martha Elisabeth Woehler. He attended the Lyceum of Strasbourg from 1890 to 1903, then studied law and economics at Kiel University and the University of Strasbourg. In 1910, Blaum received a PhD in Political Science for his thesis about the monetary system of Switzerland. From 1912 he worked as an assessor, initially as the administrative director of the poor relief system of Strasbourg. After the outbreak of the First World War, Blaum became a captain in the Alpine Corps in the Dolomites.

== Career before World War Two ==
After the end of the war, Blaum was active in the Württemberg Ministry of the Interior, where he helped draft laws. On 29 December 1921, Blaum became the mayor of Hanau. Although Blaum was a member of the German Democratic Party, he was supported in his election by the German National People's Party and the Social Democrats. Blaum's tenure as mayor saw the opening of the Hanau Port -Hanau's port on the Main river – and the Hanau city hall. Blaum served as the mayor of Hanau until 1 April 1933, when he was removed due to his liberal sympathies. After being removed from power, Blaum worked as an economic consultant.

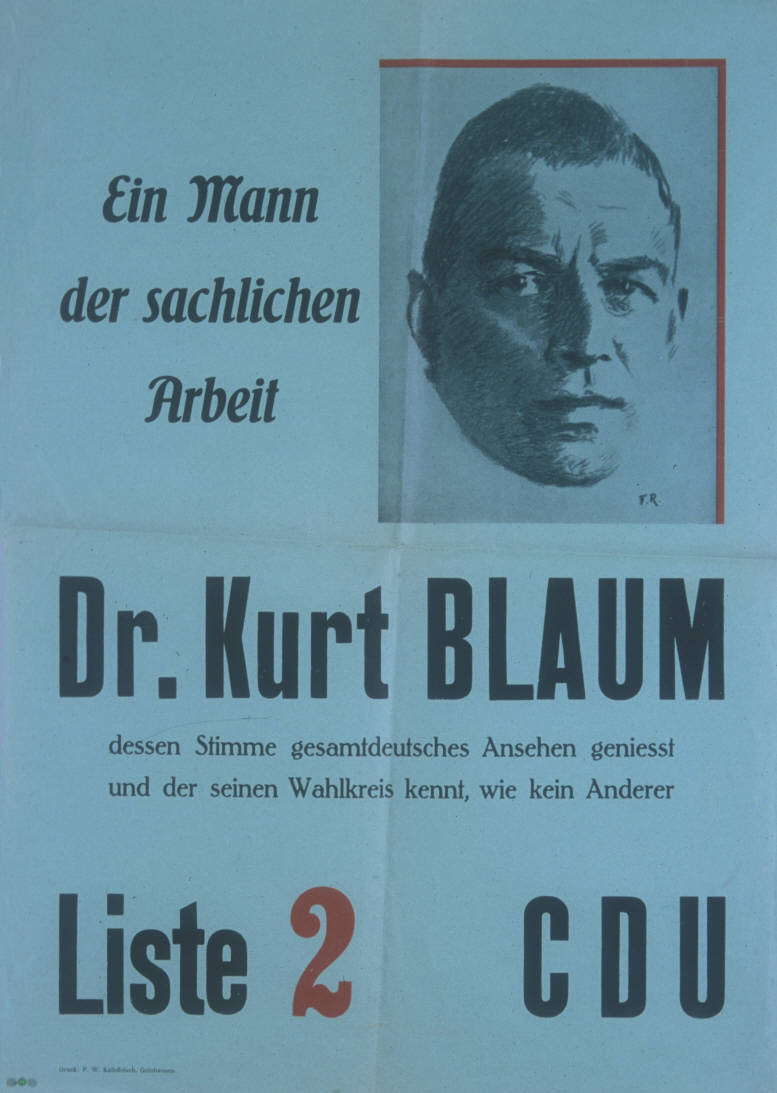
An election poster featuring Blaum for a Hesse local election

== Post-war career ==
After briefly serving in the Frankfurt Armaments Command in 1941/42 as a captain of the reserves, and working as a plant manager at car factory Oberursel, Blaum was reinstated as mayor of Hanau on 2 April 1945, on orders of the American military government. However, on 4 July 1945, Blaum was appointed the provisional Mayor of Frankfurt, succeeding Wilhelm Hollbach. Blaum's task as mayor was no small one; his time in office saw the beginning of the rebuilding after the damage of the Nazis and the war, both physically and in creating a functional city government in the city.

On 25 July 1946, Blaum contested the first democratic mayoral election as the candidate from the CDU. He lost the election to Walter Kolb, the SPD candidate and former chief municipal director of Düsseldorf.

== Later life and death ==
After losing the 1946 election, Blaum was no longer active in politics. He worked as an advisor on the German currency reform of 1948, and from 1946 to 1962 was president of the Polytechnic Society in Frankfurt am Main as well as of the Hessian Red Cross. Blaum received the Order of Merit of the Federal Republic of Germany in 1952.

Blaum died on 26 November 1970. Kurt-Blaum-Platz in Hanau is named after Blaum.
