= Kaiserhofstraße =

Street in Frankfurt, Germany

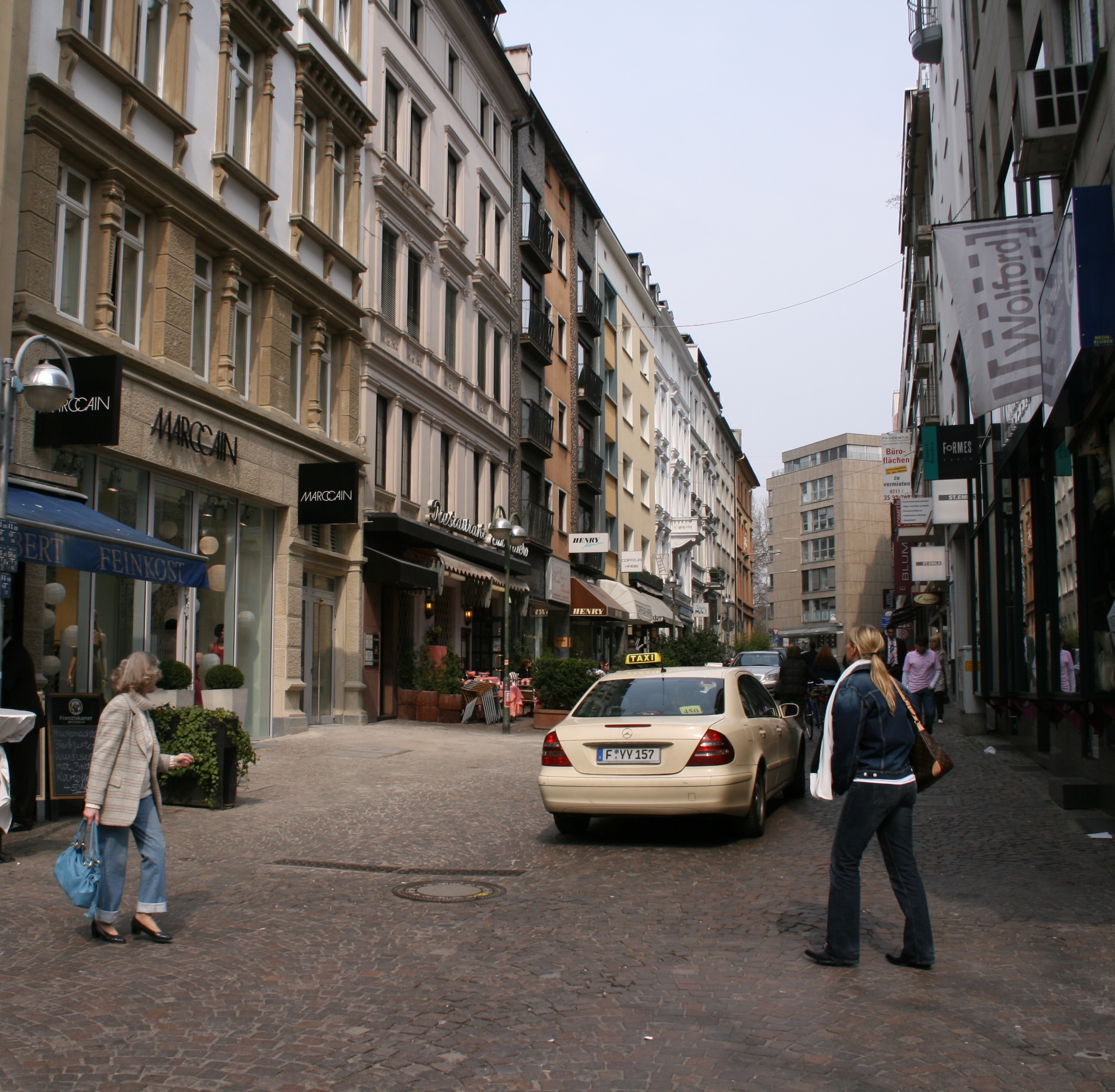
- Kaiserhofstraße seen from the Freßgass
- Interactive map of Kaiserhofstraße
- Length: 130 m (430 ft)
- Location: Innenstadt, Frankfurt
- Nearest metro station: Alte Oper; Hauptwache; Hauptwache
- Coordinates: 50.114609°N 8.674618°E
- Major junctions: Freßgass, Hochstraße

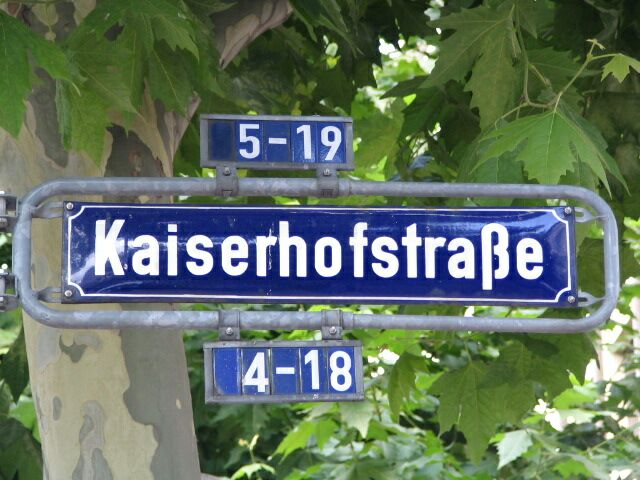
Kaiserhofstraße

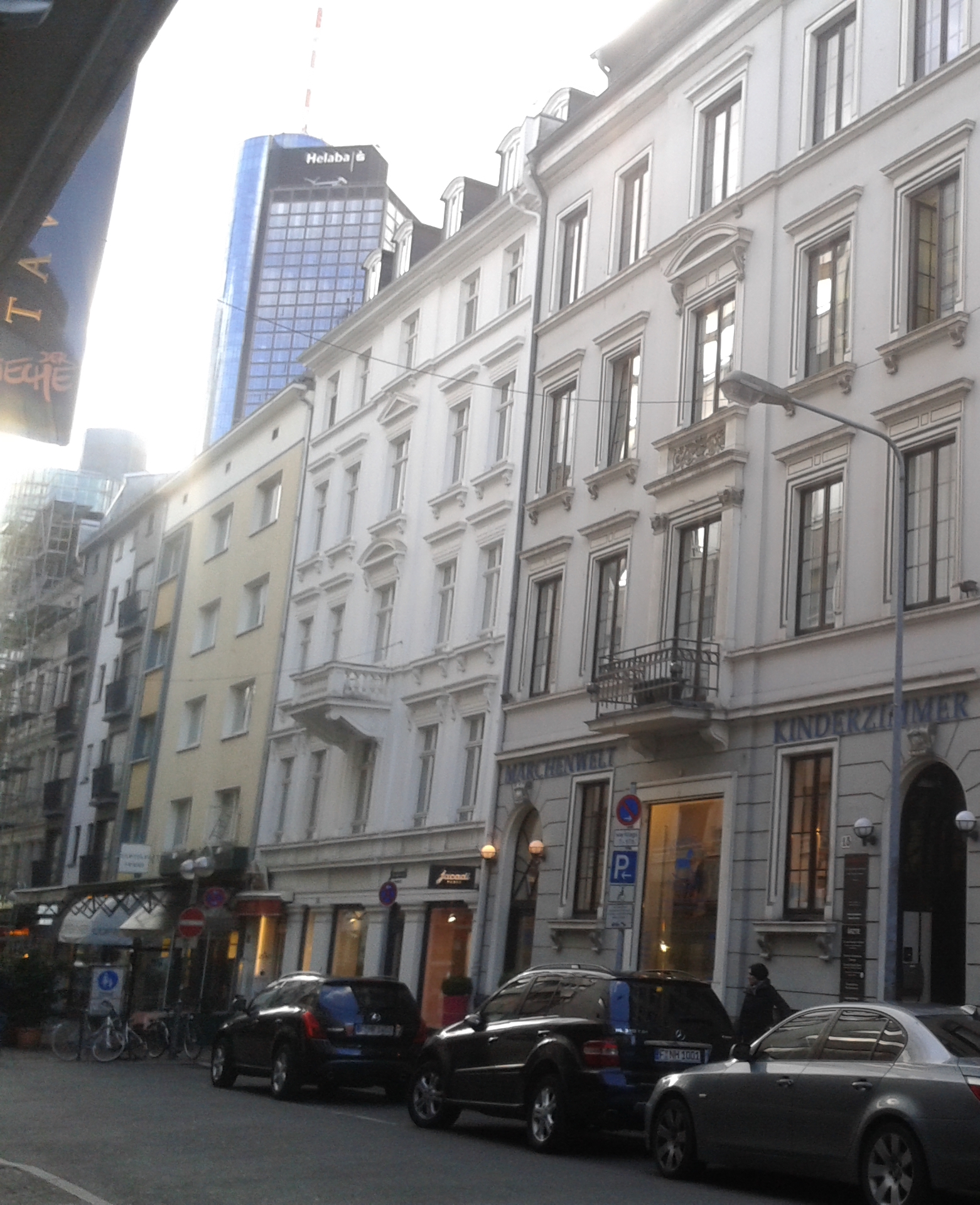
Kaiserhofstraße

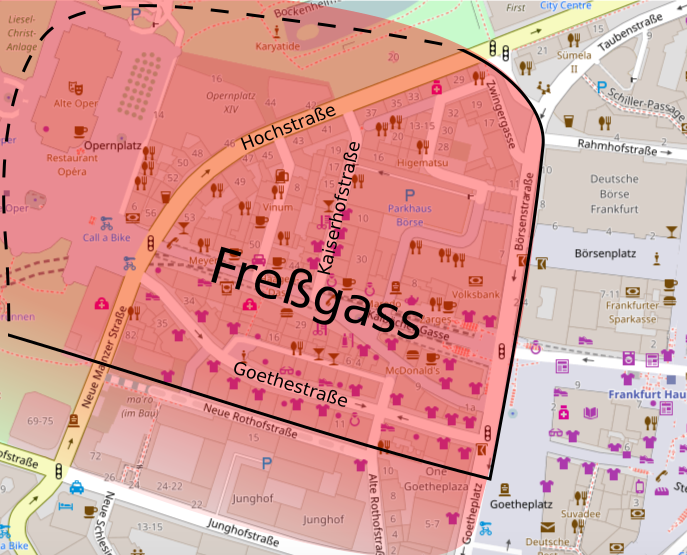
Map of the Opera Quarter in the city centre of Frankfurt, with Kaiserhofstraße between Alte Oper (Old Opera) and Börsenplatz (the Frankfurt Stock Exchange)

The Kaiserhofstraße (lit., "Emperor's Court's Street") (4–19) is a short, mostly pedestrian upmarket street in the city centre of Frankfurt, Germany, located in the Opera Quarter in the western part of the district of Innenstadt, within the central business district known unofficially as the Bankenviertel (Banking District).

The 130 meter long street runs from the Freßgass pedestrian main street to Hochstraße, and is situated between Kleine Hochstraße and Börsenstraße ("Stock Exchange Street"). It is located in the immediate vicinity of the Wallanlagen park, which is located just across the street to the north of Kaiserhofstraße, and of the Opera Square with the Old Opera, the Frankfurt Stock Exchange, the Sofitel Frankfurt Opera luxury hotel, and Germany's most well-known luxury shopping street Goethestraße. In recent years Kaiserhofstraße has also increasingly become a luxury shopping street as some stores from Goethestraße have moved to Kaiserhofstraße a minute's walk away. The street is also located close to numerous large financial institutions.

The street is mainly occupied by office spaces, especially for boutique financial institutions such as investment and wealth management firms, select residential apartments, high-end fashion businesses, and four restaurants. The rent in the area surrounding Freßgass is the highest in Frankfurt.

== Overview ==
The Kaiserhofstraße is a side street directly adjacent to the Freßgass ("Eating Street") upmarket shopping street, the western continuation of the Zeil, Germany's busiest shopping street. Freßgass became so named around 1900 because of its many high-end food shops, bakeries and butcheries, making it the most famous food shopping street serving the bourgeoisie of the Westend. Today the Freßgass is famous as the street where the bankers from the Bankenviertel meet for lunch, and for its annual wine festival.

The Kaiserhofstraße is, like Freßgass, largely a pedestrian zone, with perfume shops, high end fashion boutiques, gourmet restaurants, law chambers, financial institutions such as wealth management and investment firms, and select residential apartments. The street is situated between and close to the Opernplatz (with the Alte Oper concert hall) and the Frankfurt Stock Exchange (both of which are found around the block in opposite directions), and also near Goethestraße (on the other side of Freßgass), Germany's most famous luxury shopping street. On the roof of Kaiserhofstraße 12, there is a mediterranean restaurant and bar, the Long Island Summer Lounge. The Frankfurt flagship Apple Store is located just around the corner in Freßgass, ten meters from Kaiserhofstraße. The Sofitel Frankfurt Opera luxury hotel and the Wallanlagen park are located just across the street to the north of Kaiserhofstraße.

In the early 20th century, the street was characterised by its diversity; many artists, actors and actresses employed by the nearby opera, some prostitutes and several Jewish families lived on the street. A rapid process of gentrification took place later during the 20th century, and saw the street become one of the most fashionable streets in the city. An acclaimed memoir, Kaiserhofstraße 12 by Valentin Senger, which was adapted into a motion picture by Hessischer Rundfunk in 1980, is named for the street, and recounts the author's childhood at Kaiserhofstrasse 12 as the son of Russian-Jewish immigrants during the 1920s and 1930s:

The student fraternity Rhenania [...] honored our street by moving into No. 19. Real duels were fought on their fencing floor. There was a Greek statue, large enough to attract universal attention, made out of sandstone in a niche at the front of the building. When no one was looking, I could pull myself up on the window ledge, and stand on the iron cellar door and get a glimpse of the students slashing and bloodying each other. But what made our street special were the artists, painters and actors and especially singers, who lived there—the opera house wasn't far away and most of our singers were members of the company. They gave our street a free-and-easy, sometimes almost wicked character. Two rather forbidding establishments, bars that were open only at night, reinforced this atmosphere. You couldn't see what was going on inside because of the thick red plush curtains over the glass doors. For a time one of them was the city's leading homosexual hangout. Even so, Kaiserhofstrasse was a respectable middle-class street, quite acceptable to polite society.

In the late 19th century, a local wine cellar owned by Italian-born Giovita Salini (father of the artist Lino Salini) was a famous meeting place for Frankfurt artists. The Banque Générale du Luxembourg formerly had its German offices in Kaiserhofstraße 13, while the private bank of Hauck & Aufhäuser had its offices in Kaiserhofstraße 16.

The real estate prices of the area are the highest in Frankfurt; its primary adjacent street Freßgass has the third highest rent in all of Frankfurt, after nearby streets Goethestraße and Zeil. The street is located within the postcode area 60313 Frankfurt am Main.

== Public transport ==
Kaiserhofstraße is served by the nearby Frankfurt Hauptwache station (two or three minutes walk down Freßgass to the east) and the Alte Oper station of the Frankfurt U-Bahn (to the west), which is accessible from the Opernplatz, a minute's walk around the corner.

== Nearby sights with walking distances ==
- Directly borders Freßgass and Hochstraße
- 10 metres from the Wallanlagen park
- 10 metres from the Sofitel Frankfurt Opera apartment building and 50 metres (30 seconds) from the main hotel building
- 10 metres from the Frankfurt Apple Store in Freßgass
- 80 metres (1 minute) from Goethestraße
- 130 metres (1.5 minutes) from Opernplatz
- 130 metres (1.5 minutes) from the Frankfurt Stock Exchange
- 130 metres (1.5 minutes) from the Rathenauplatz/Goetheplatz
- 250 metres (3 minutes) from Hauptwache
- 270 metres (3 minutes) from the Main Tower
- 350 metres (4 minutes) from the Zeil
- 350 metres (4 minutes) from the Commerzbank Tower
- 370 metres (4 minutes) from the Deutsche Bank headquarters
- 530 metres (6 minutes) from the Eurotower, former seat of, and still used by, the European Central Bank
- 700 metres (8 minutes) from the Römerberg

== Gallery ==
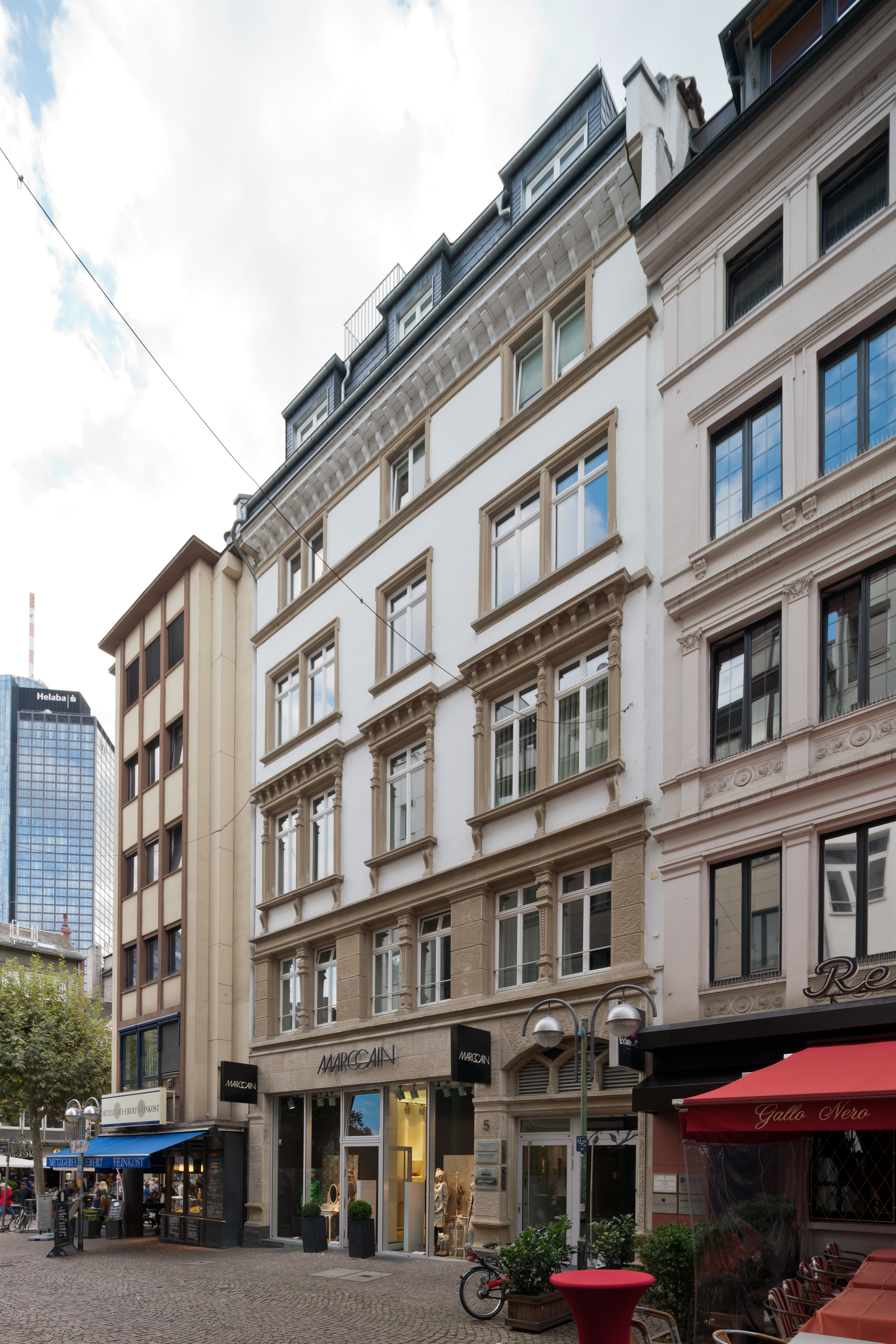
Kaiserhofstraße 5, at the corner of Freßgass. Built 1875 in the late Classicist style. The building is under cultural heritage protection. The Main Tower in the background.

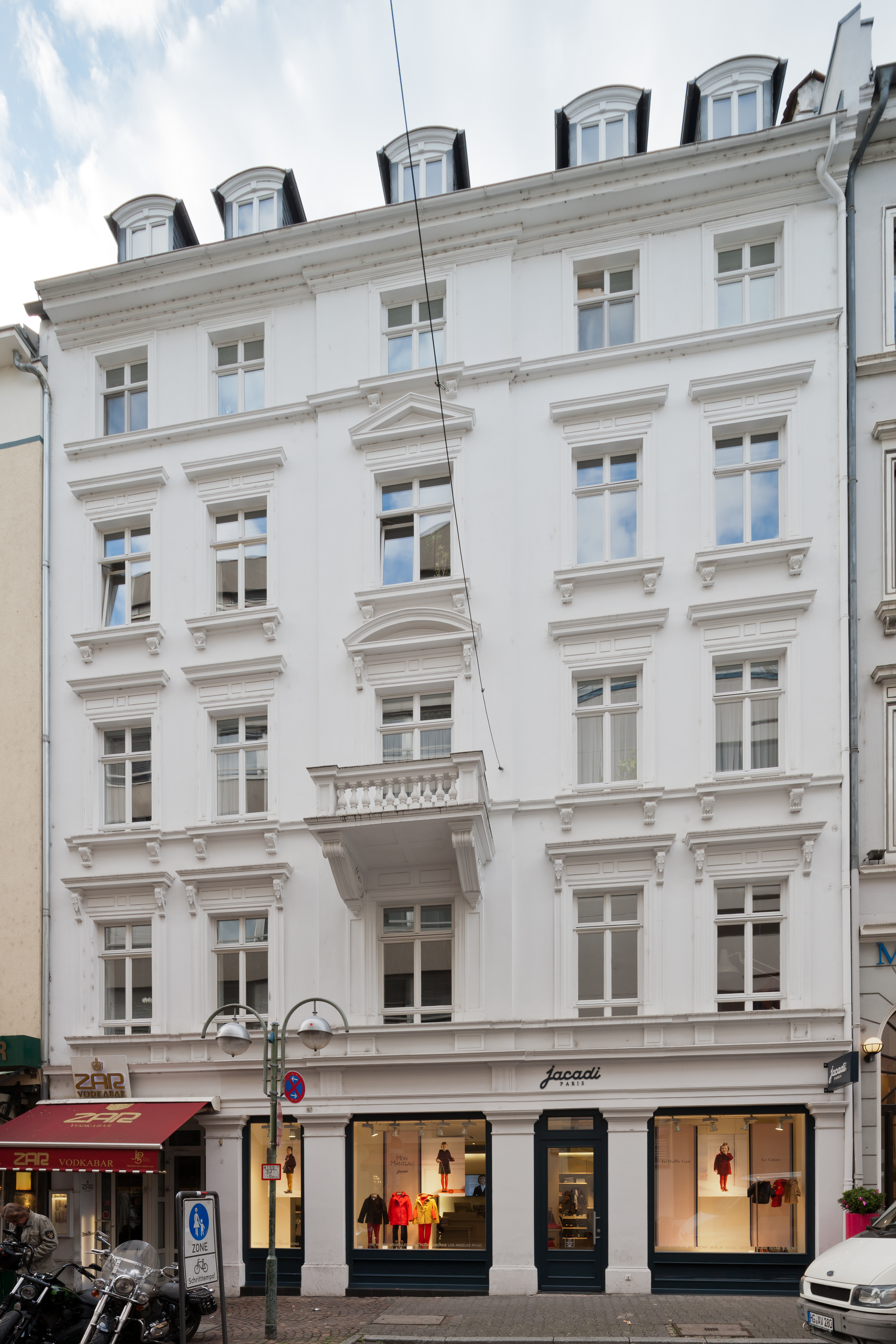
Kaiserhofstraße 13, former offices of the Banque Générale du Luxembourg. Built 1879. Neo-Renaissance building in the Neoclassicist tradition. The building is under cultural heritage protection.

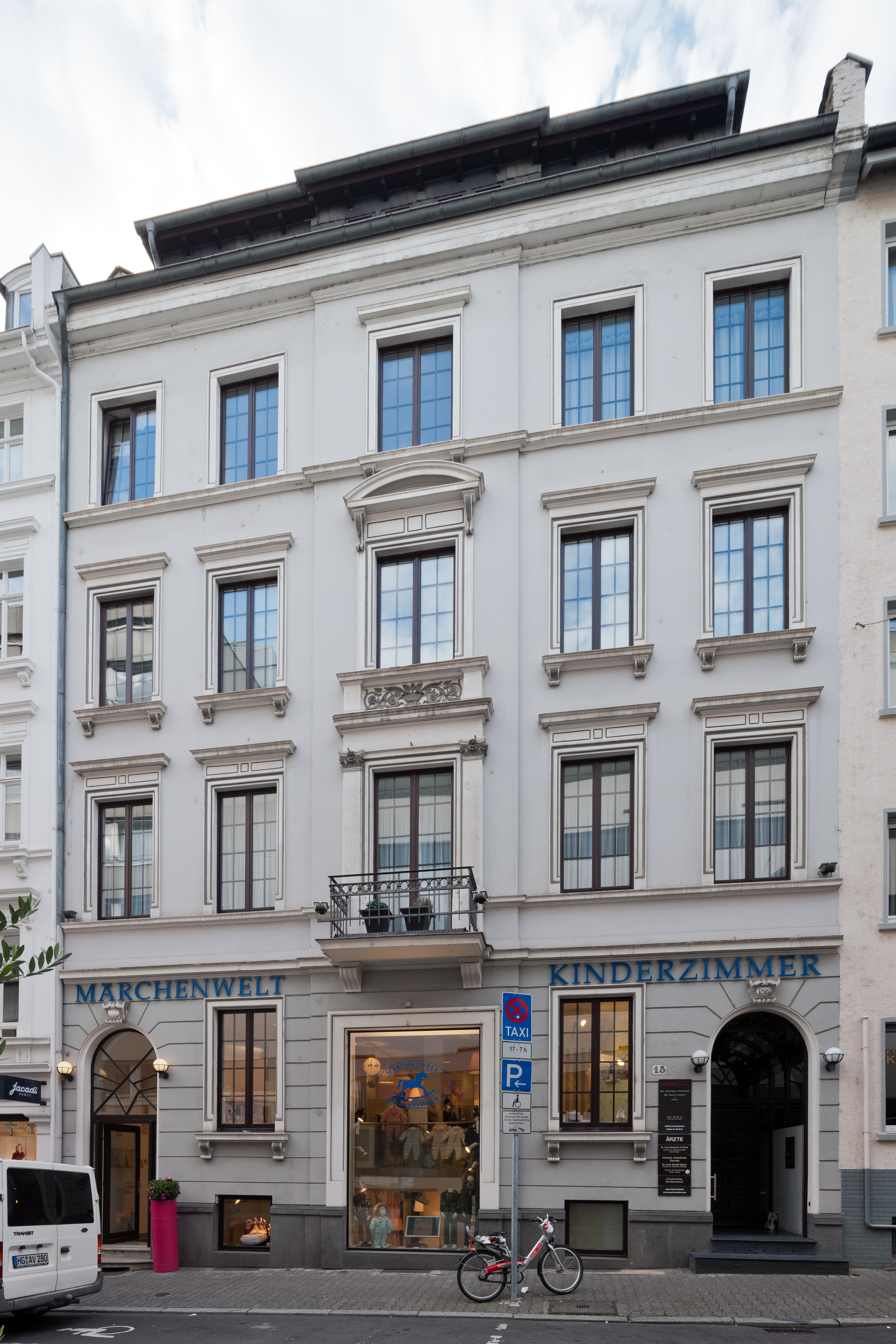
Kaiserhofstraße 15, built 1879. Neo-Renaissance building in the Neoclassicist tradition. The building is under cultural heritage protection.

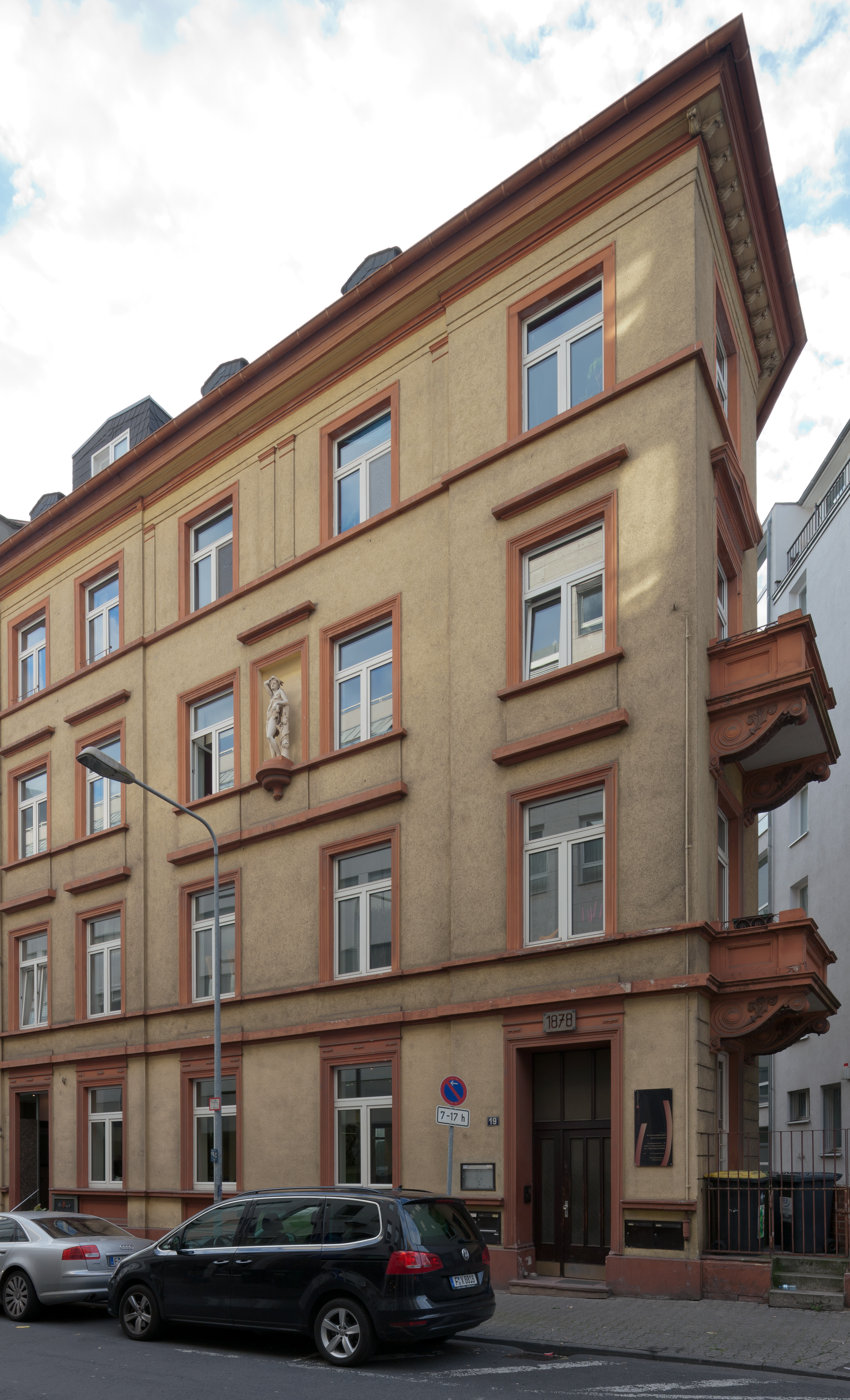
Kaiserhofstraße 19, with the construction year 1878 found over the entrance. Neo-Renaissance building in the Neoclassicist tradition. Main front with avant-corps and niche. The building is under cultural heritage protection.
