= Opera Quarter (Frankfurt) =

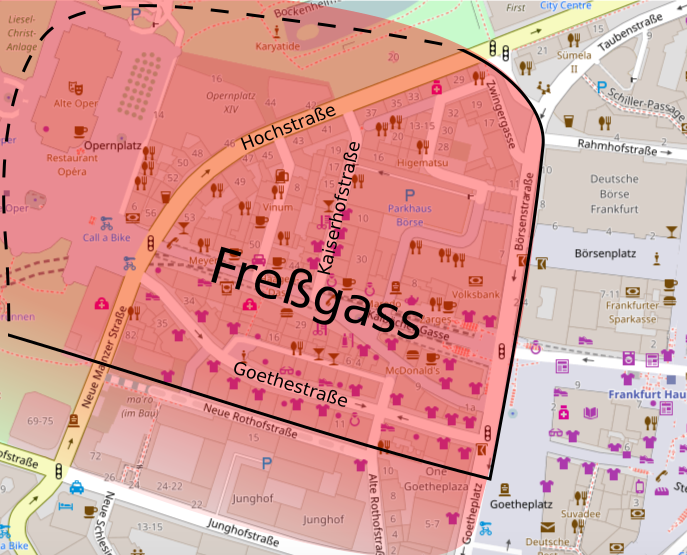
The Frankfurt Opera Quarter, with the core area within the black border and the extended area included in the red area

The Opera Quarter (German: Opernviertel or Opernquartier) is an area in the western part of the Innenstadt (Inner City) district of Frankfurt, Germany. It is named for the Old Opera and comprises the old opera's immediate neighbourhood in the Innenstadt district.

The Opera Quarter is defined as the area between the Old Opera and the central city square Opernplatz in the west and the Frankfurt Stock Exchange and the Rathenauplatz/Goetheplatz in the east, and is centered on the pedestrian main street Freßgass, its most important street. In addition to the Freßgass itself, the quarter includes Goethestraße, Kaiserhofstraße and the narrow streetlet Kleine Hochstraße, and some other smaller streetlets, and a portion of the road Hochstraße/Neue Mainzer Straße. Recently, Neue Rothofstraße has been included as well.

The Opera Quarter is especially known for its many luxury boutiques, especially in Goethestraße, Freßgass, Kaiserhofstraße and Hochstraße, and for its restaurants and nightlife. The Opera Quarter also includes office spaces and select residential apartments. The Sofitel Frankfurt Opera luxury hotel is found in the Opera Quarter. The Opera Quarter is located within the larger central business district known as the Bankenviertel (Banking District), but it is generally characterised by relatively lower buildings as compared to the high-rise buildings found elsewhere in the Bankenviertel.
