= Sofitel Frankfurt Opera =

Hotel in Frankfurt, Germany

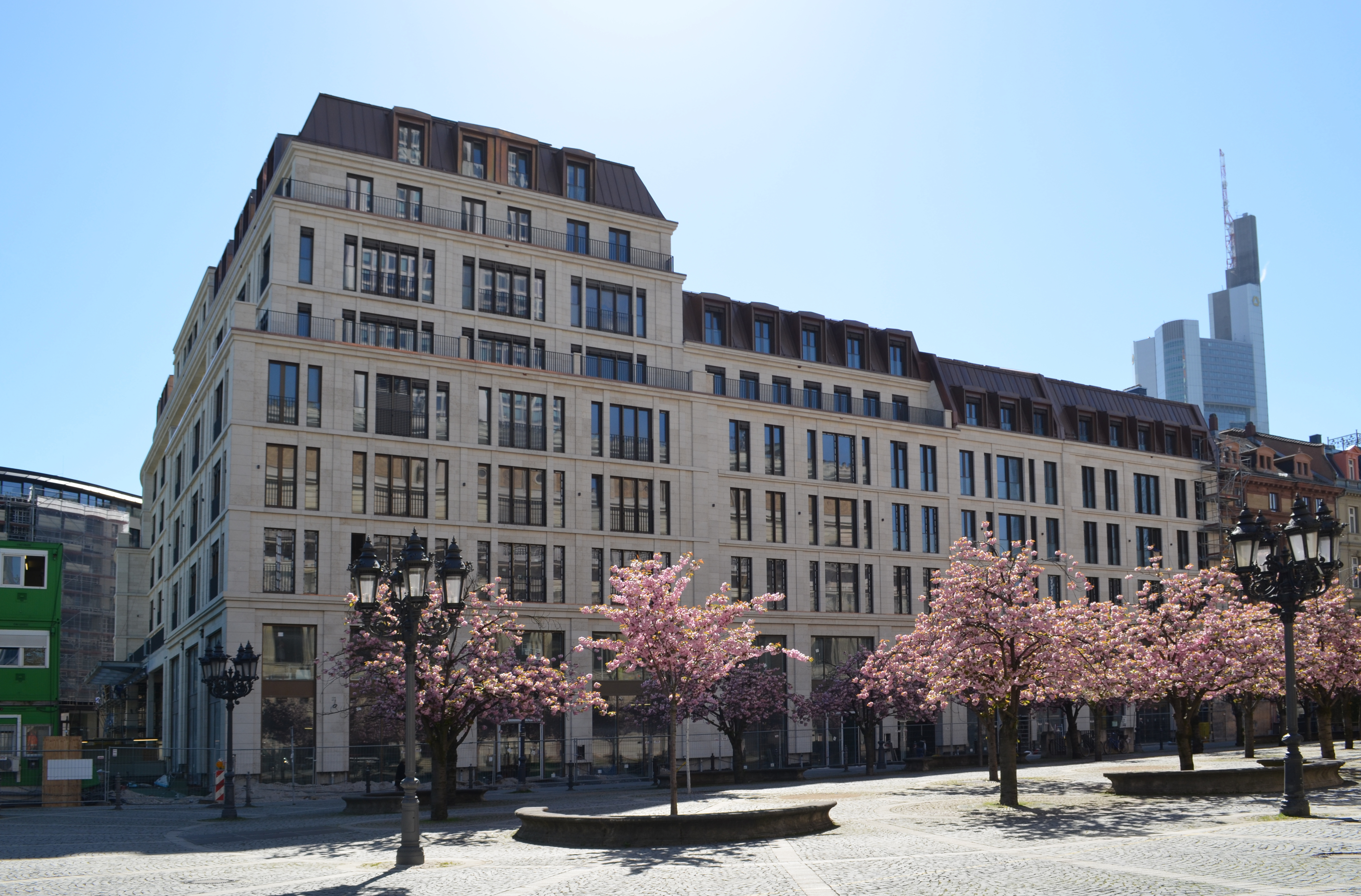
- Sofitel Frankfurt Opera under construction in April 2016
- Interactive map of the Sofitel Frankfurt Opera area

General information
- Location: Opernplatz 14, Frankfurt
- Coordinates: 50°06′57″N 8°40′25″E
- Opening: 2016
- Management: Sofitel

Other information
- Number of rooms: 150
- Number of suites: 31

Sofitel Frankfurt Opera is a luxury hotel in Frankfurt, Germany and part of the Sofitel brand by Accor.

== Location ==
It is part of the French Sofitel chain of luxury hotels, and is located in the Opera Quarter and in the centre of the central business district known unofficially as the Bankenviertel (Banking District), in the Inner City district. The hotel is facing the Opera Square with the Old Opera on one side, the upmarket street Hochstraße on another side and the Wallanlagen park on the third side.

The main entrance of the hotel is directly facing the Wallanlagen park, and the hotel also has entrances from the Opera Square and Hochstraße. The hotel is located in the immediate vicinity of the Frankfurt Stock Exchange, numerous other financial institutions, and some of Germany's most well-known high-end shopping streets, e.g. Goethestraße and Freßgass. Its Hochstraße front faces the short upmarket pedestrian streets Kleine Hochstraße and Kaiserhofstraße, with several restaurants and high-end shops and which both lead to the Freßgass a hundred meters down the street. The Freßgass and the Goethestraße can also be reached from the Opera Square.

== History ==
The hotel was built in a neohistoricist style between 2011 and 2016 after extensive public discussion and is scheduled to officially open in Autumn 2016. The hotel is targeted at highly wealthy individual customers as well as corporations. The building complex includes office spaces and conference facilities, a ballroom, 150 hotel rooms, 30 suites, one presidential suite, apartments for rent, a gourmet restaurant named Schönemanns (after the Frankfurt banking family to which Goethe's fiancée Lili belonged), a bar, select high-end shops, a fitness studio and an underground parking garage.

The hotel's soft opening took place on 20 October 2016, with French Prime Minister Manuel Valls, French Culture Minister Audrey Azoulay and Frankfurt Lord Mayor Peter Feldmann in attendance.
