= Hochstraße (Frankfurt) =

Street in Frankfurt, Germany

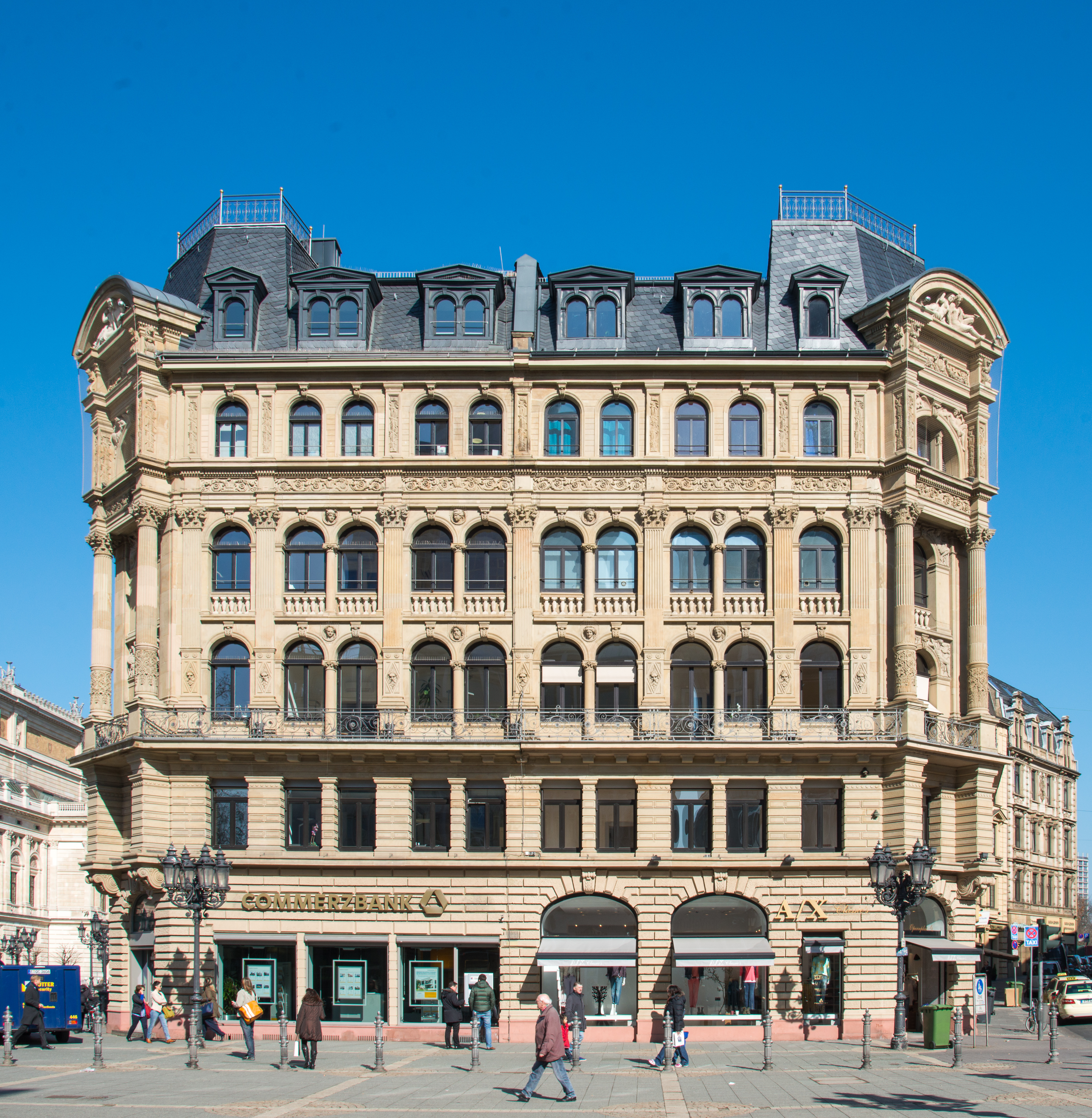
- Hochstraße 56
- Interactive map of Hochstraße
- Location: Innenstadt, Frankfurt
- Coordinates: 50°06′59″N 8°40′31″E
- Major junctions: Opera Square, Freßgass, Kleine Hochstraße, Kaiserhofstraße, Börsenstraße, Eschenheimer Tor

The Hochstraße (lit. 'High Street') is a short street in the city centre of Frankfurt, Germany, located in the Opera Quarter in the western part of the district of Innenstadt, within the central business district known unofficially as the Bankenviertel (Banking District).

It runs from the Opera Square and the western ends of the Freßgass and Goethestraße high-end shopping streets to the Eschenheimer Tor, along the Wallanlagen park area to the north. The Hochstraße includes several listed buildings from the Gründerzeit era. It also notably includes the Sofitel Frankfurt Opera five star plus luxury hotel and the Hilton Frankfurt City Centre hotel, both facing the Wallanlagen park from opposite ends. The street also has a number of high-end shops, restaurants, select residential buildings and office buildings, mainly for financial institutions. The Hochstraße has a few smaller adjacent streets, including the pedestrian streets Kleine Hochstraße and Kaiserhofstraße, which both lead to the Freßgass main street around hundred meters down the street, and the Börsenstraße (Stock Exchange Street), which leads to the Frankfurt Stock Exchange 50 metres away from the Hochstraße. The street is also located near to numerous large financial institutions. The Hochstraße is traditionally considered one of the most fashionable streets in Frankfurt, and the street has in recent years regained this position through major developments, particularly the construction of the widely praised Sofitel Frankfurt Opera hotel in a neo-historicist style as a dominant feature of the street.

== Gallery ==
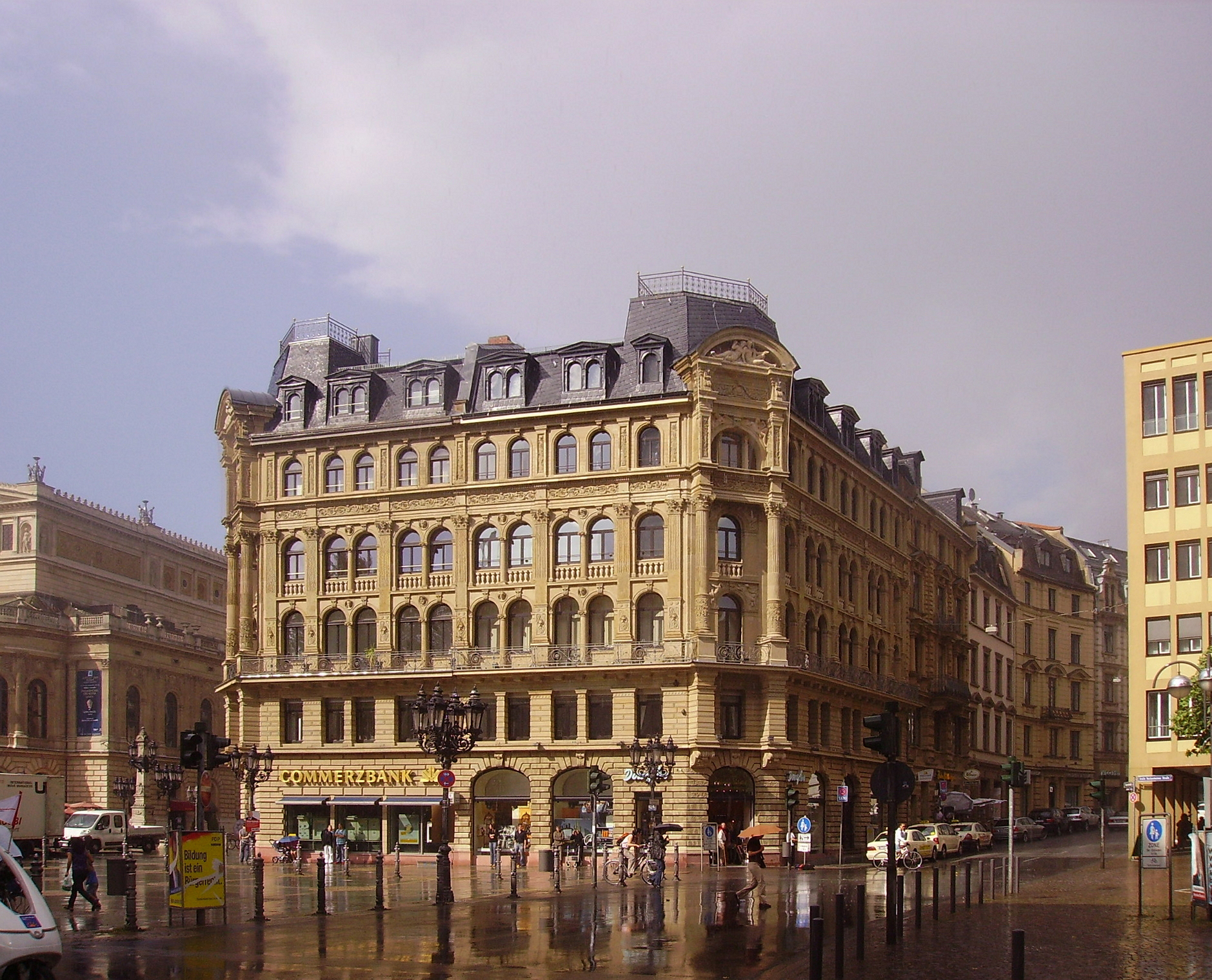
Hochstraße 56, with the Opera Square to the left and the Freßgass to the right

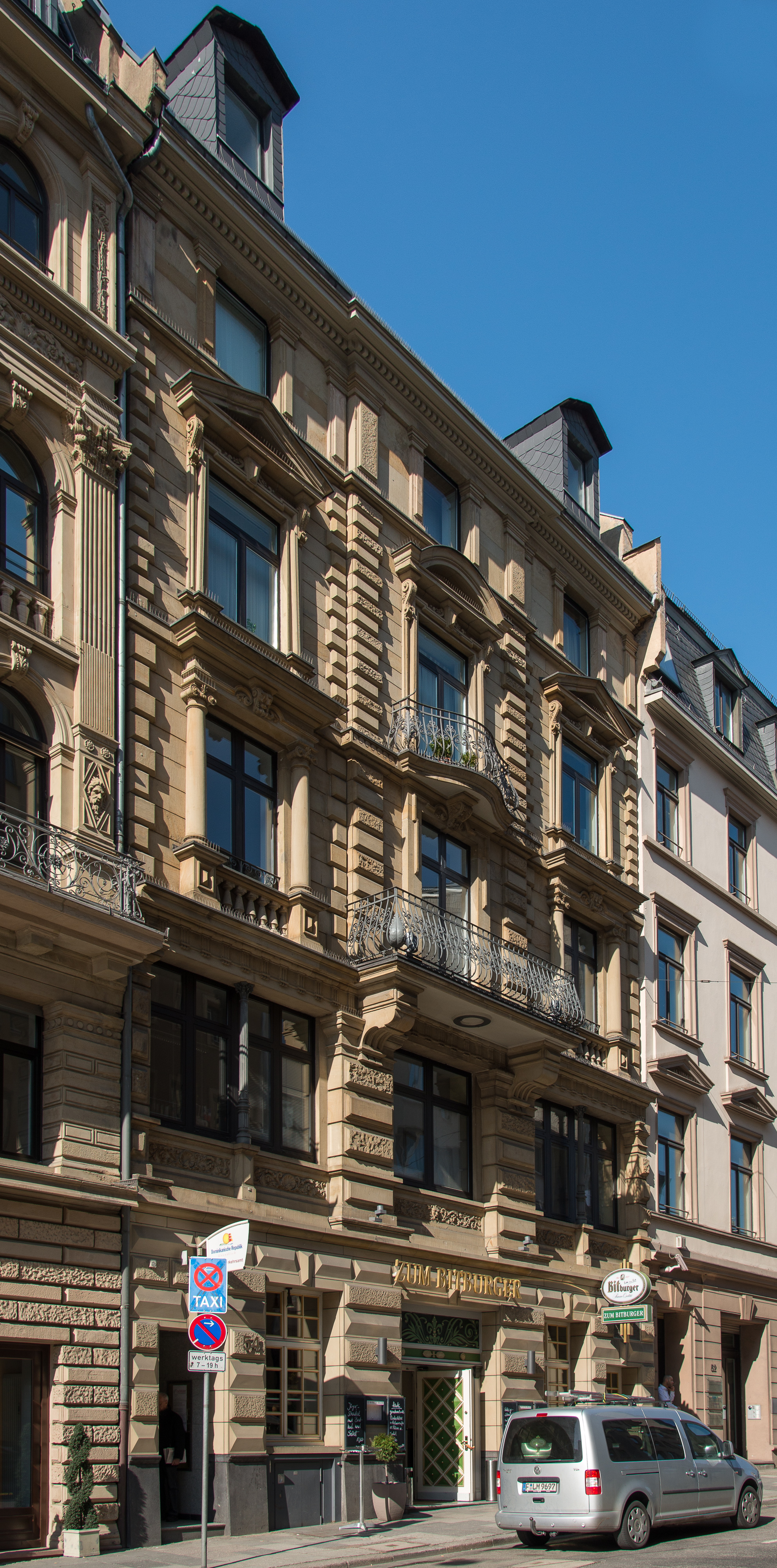
