= Goethestraße =

Street in Frankfurt, Germany

Coordinates: 50°06′51″N 8°40′25″E

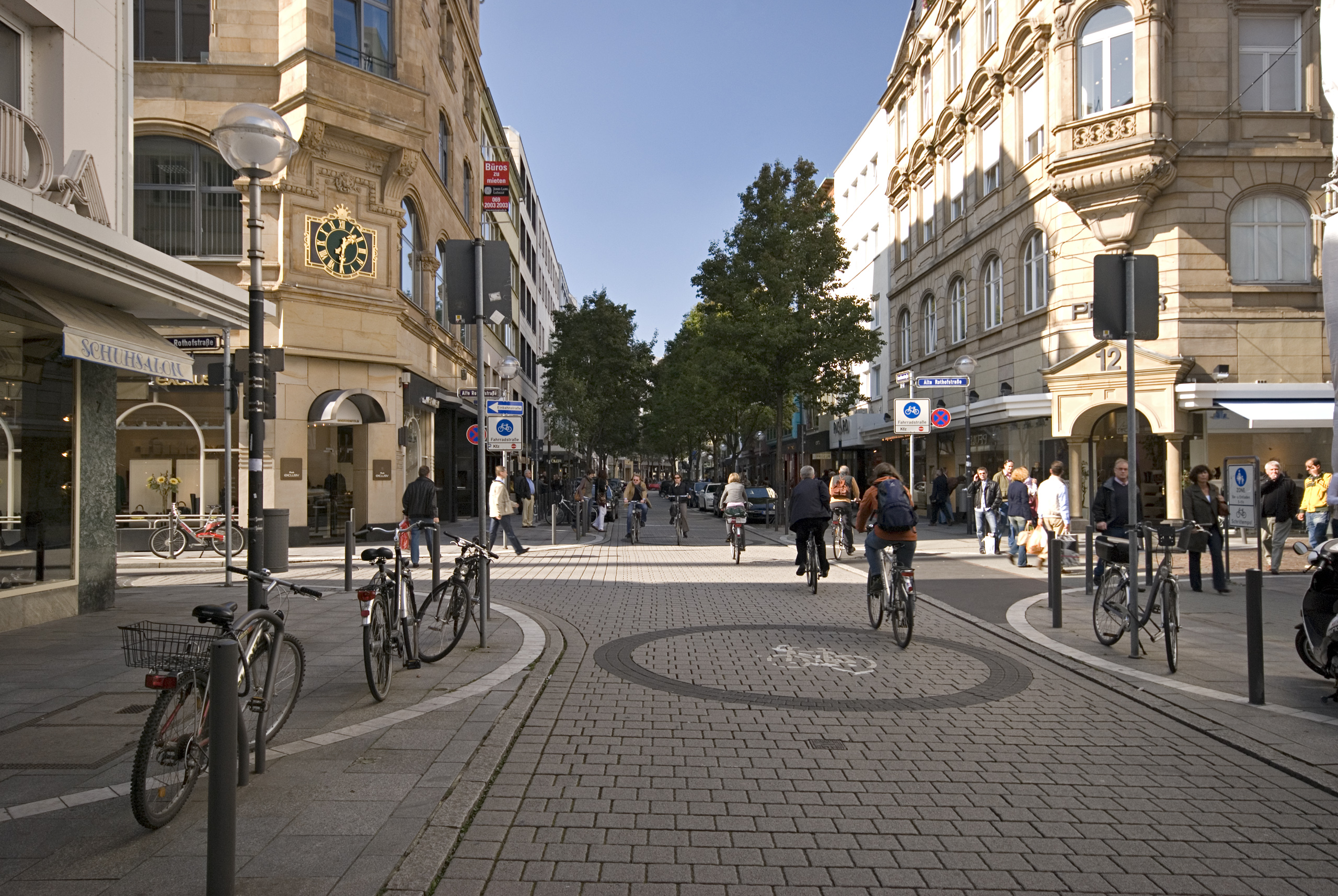
- Goethestraße
- Length: 290 m (950 ft)
- Location: Innenstadt, Frankfurt

Construction
- Inauguration: 1892

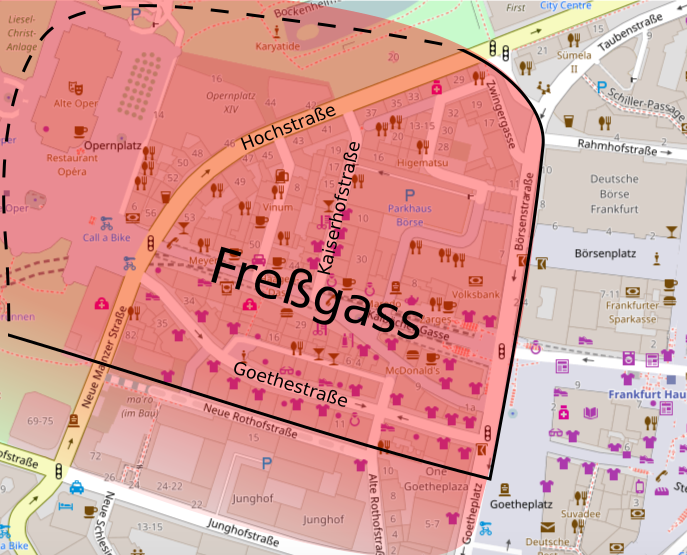
Map of the Opera Quarter in the city centre of Frankfurt

Goethestraße is a luxury shopping street in the city centre of Frankfurt, Germany, located between Opernplatz (in the west) and Börsenstraße and Goetheplatz (in the east) in the district of Innenstadt and within the Opera Quarter and the broader central business district known as the Bankenviertel. It is a parallel street of Freßgass and located in the immediate vicinity of Kaiserhofstraße. The street is Germany's third-busiest luxury shopping street.

The street was constructed between 1892 and 1894 and named for Johann Wolfgang von Goethe.

== Public transport ==
Goethestraße is served by nearby Frankfurt Hauptwache station (in the east) and the Alte Oper station of the Frankfurt U-Bahn (in the west).

== Businesses ==
Retail establishments in Goethestraße include: Armani, Bally, Bulgari, Burberry, Chanel, Ermenegildo Zegna, Gucci, Hermès, Hugo Boss, Jil Sander, Louis Vuitton, Longchamp, Jimmy Choo, Montblanc, Patek Philippe, Prada, Salvatore Ferragamo, Tiffany & Co., Tumi, Versace, and Vertu.
