= Freßgass =

Shopping street in Frankfurt

- Große Bockenheimer Straße; Kalbächer Gasse
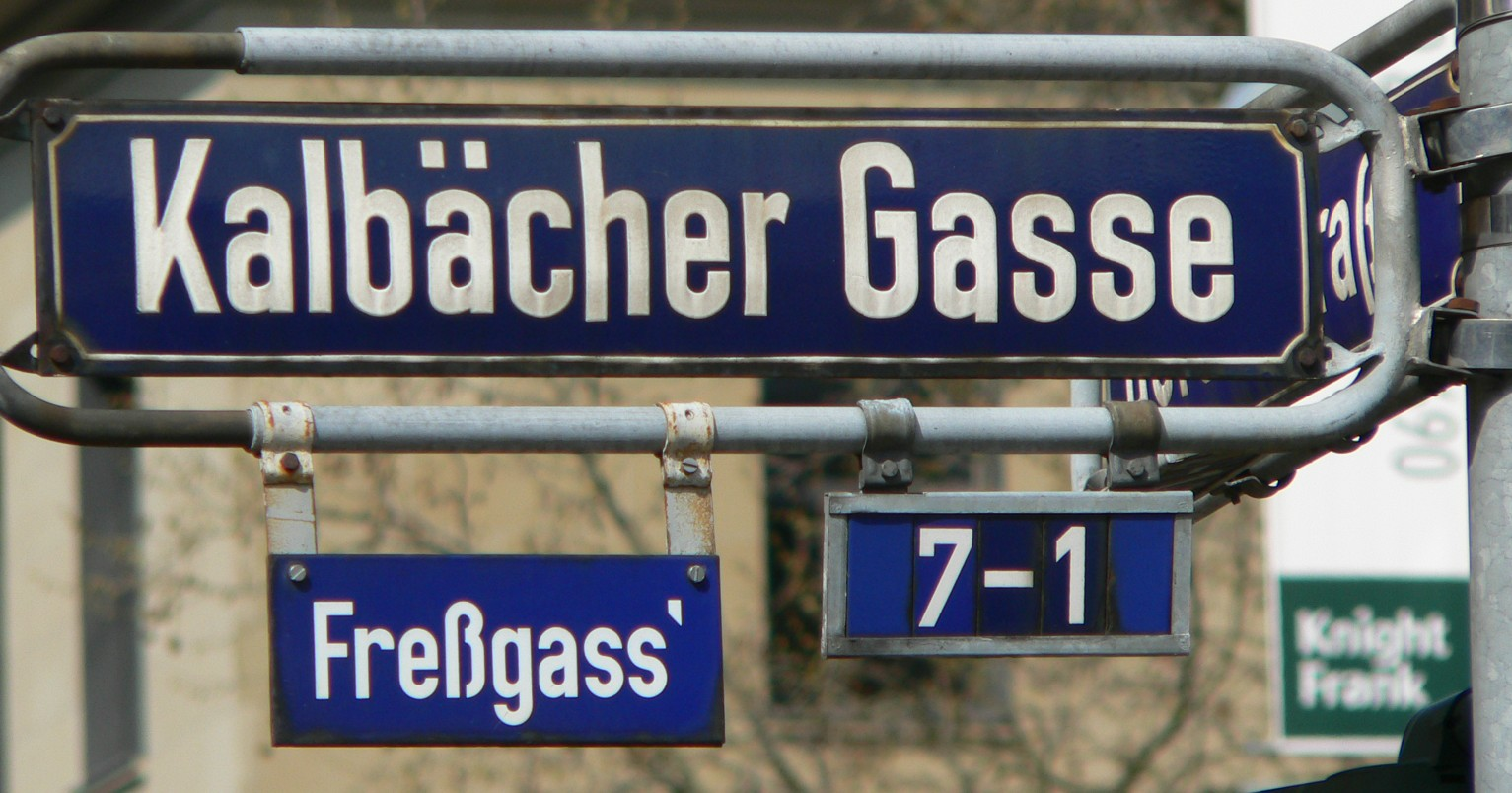
- Freßgass
- Interactive map of Freßgass
- Former name: Bockenheimer Gass
- Type: Pedestrian
- Length: 280 m (920 ft)
- Location: Innenstadt, Frankfurt
- Nearest metro station: Alte Oper; Hauptwache; Hauptwache
- Coordinates: 50°06′52″N 8°40′30″E

Construction
- Completion: first documented 1350
- Inauguration: =Middle ages

Other
- Known for: Culinary arts; upmarket shopping street; former pig market

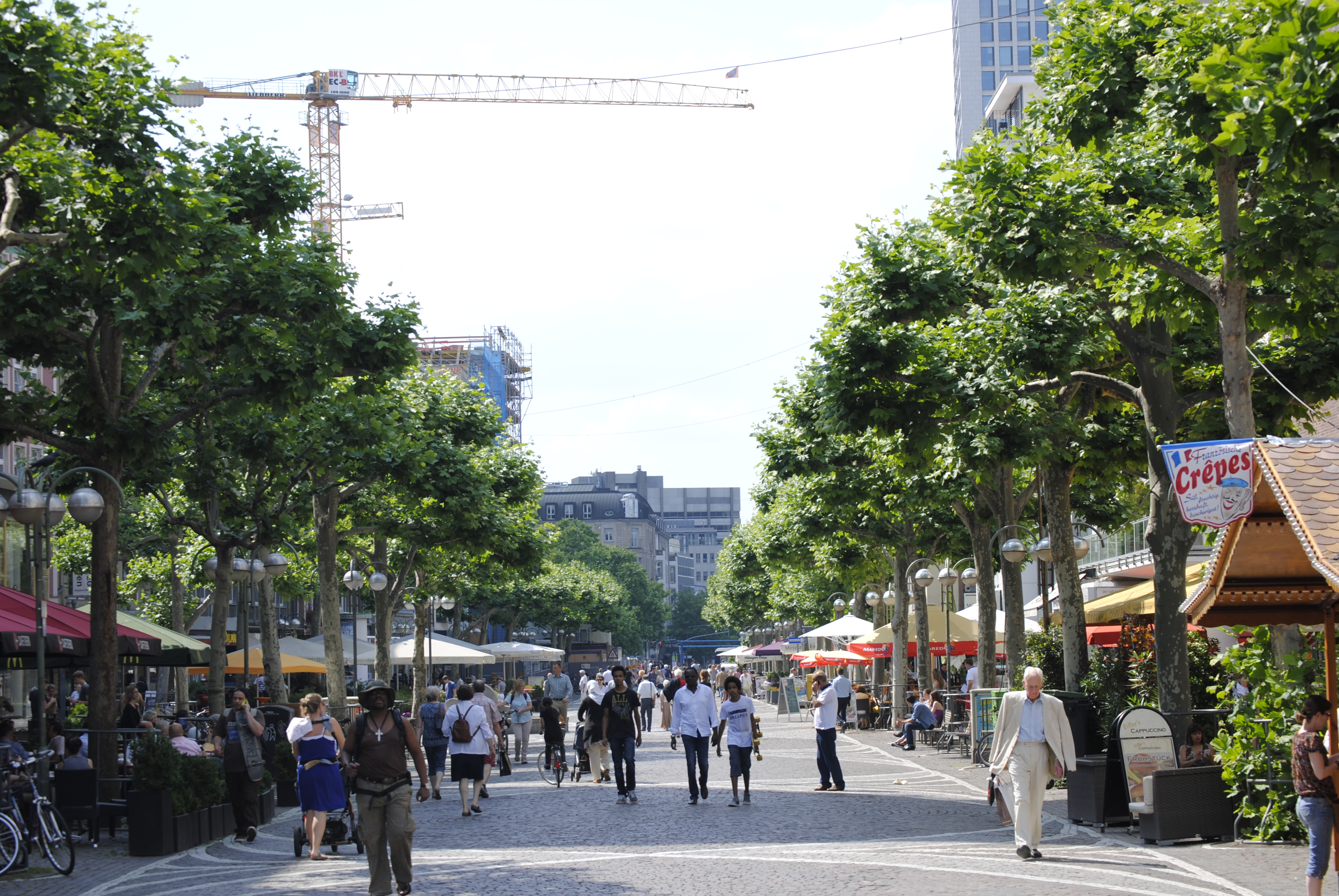
Freßgass

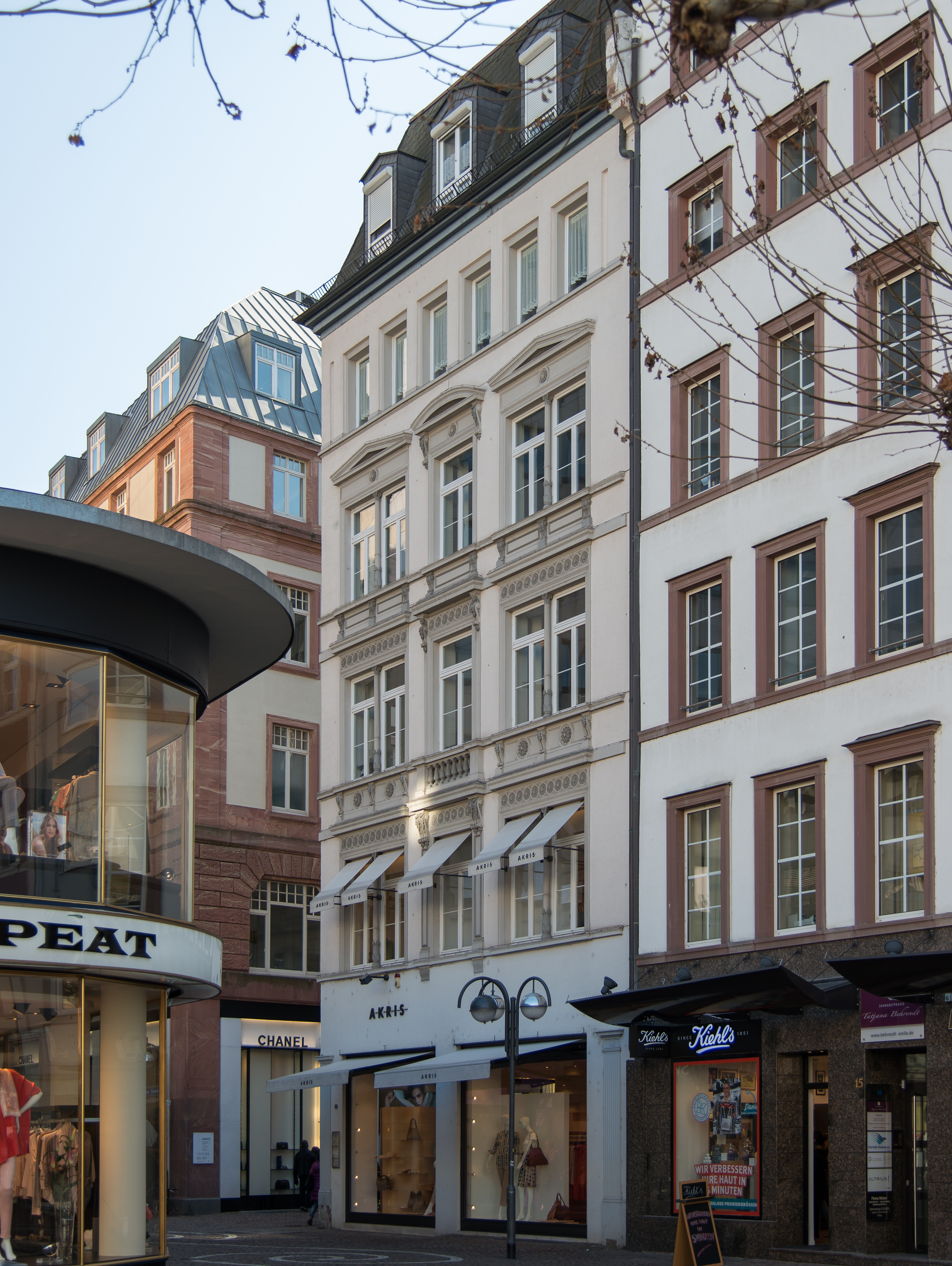
Freßgass

Freßgass (Fressgass, lit. 'Scoff Lane') is an upmarket shopping street in the city centre of Frankfurt, Germany, located in the district of Innenstadt and within the central business district known as the Bankenviertel. It is commonly regarded as Frankfurt's culinary main street. The street is a broad pedestrian zone, and is located between Hochstraße and the Opernplatz (Opera Square) with the Alte Oper in the west and the Börsenstraße (Stock Exchange Street) in the east. The street is also the direct continuation (in the western direction) of the Zeil, and is a parallel street of Goethestraße, a nationally known luxury shopping street. In recent years Freßgass has increasingly become a luxury shopping street, serving as an extension of the Goethestraße in this regard. Its other primary adjacent street is the Kaiserhofstraße.

Freßgass was originally an unofficial name, adopted around 1900 by its local population, for the streets Kalbächer Gasse and Große Bockenheimer Straße, because of their many food shops, bakeries and butcher shops, making it the most famous food shopping street serving the bourgeoisie of the Westend. Today the Freßgass is known as an area where bankers meet for lunch; banker Alex Bergen notes that "around 90% of the meeting and greeting between M&A bankers happens in one street – the Fressgass." In 1977, the name Freßgass became an official name for the streets Kalbächer Gasse and Große Bockenheimer Straße.

The annual Rheingau Wine Festival (Rheingauer Weinmarkt) takes place in the Freßgass in late summer, showcasing wineries from Rheingau and Rheinhessen. It started in 1978.

The real estate prices in Freßgass and its adjacent streets are the highest in Frankfurt. The Freßgass itself has the third highest rent after its two neighbouring streets, the Goethestraße and the Zeil. Freßgass features the flagship stores, fashion boutiques, specialty food shops and restaurants.

== Gallery ==
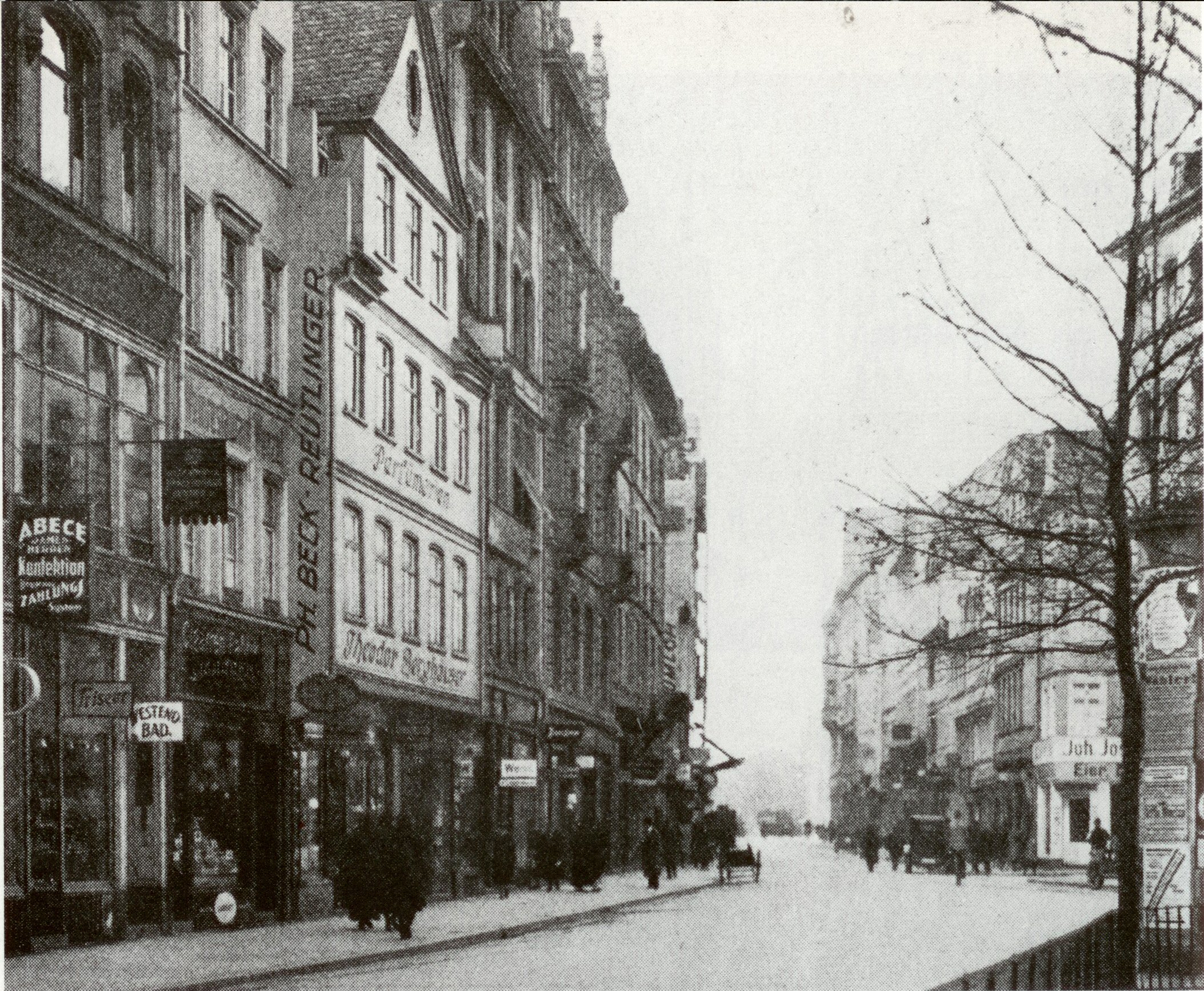
Freßgass around 1900, seen from Opernplatz

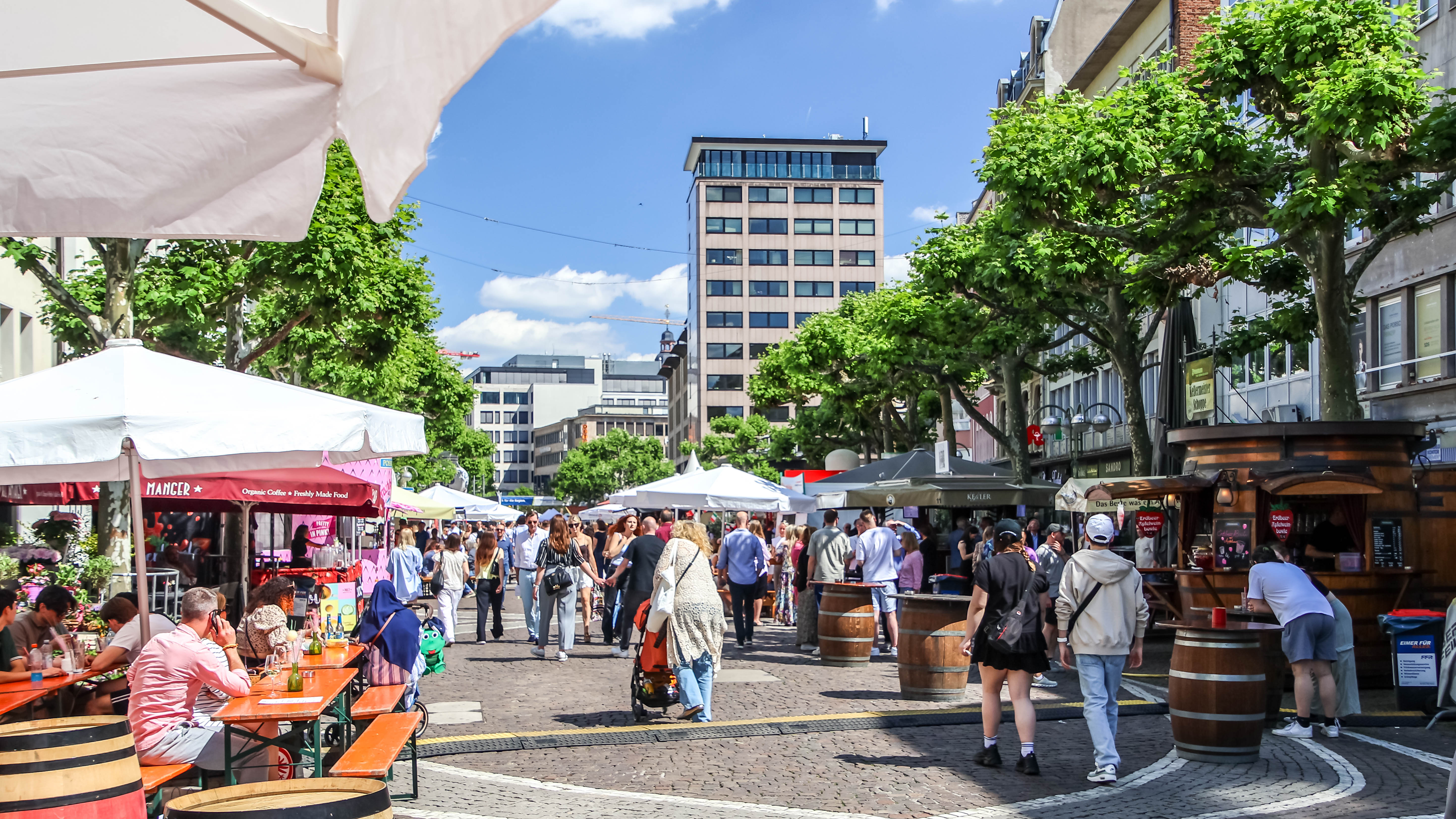
Freßgass street fair (2025)

== Public transport ==
Freßgass is served by nearby Frankfurt Hauptwache station (in the east) and the Alte Oper (Frankfurt U-Bahn) (in the west).

== Adjacent streets ==
- Hochstraße
- Kleine Hochstraße
- Kaiserhofstraße
- Meisengasse
- Börsenstraße
