= Alte Oper (Frankfurt U-Bahn) =

Underground rail station in Frankfurt

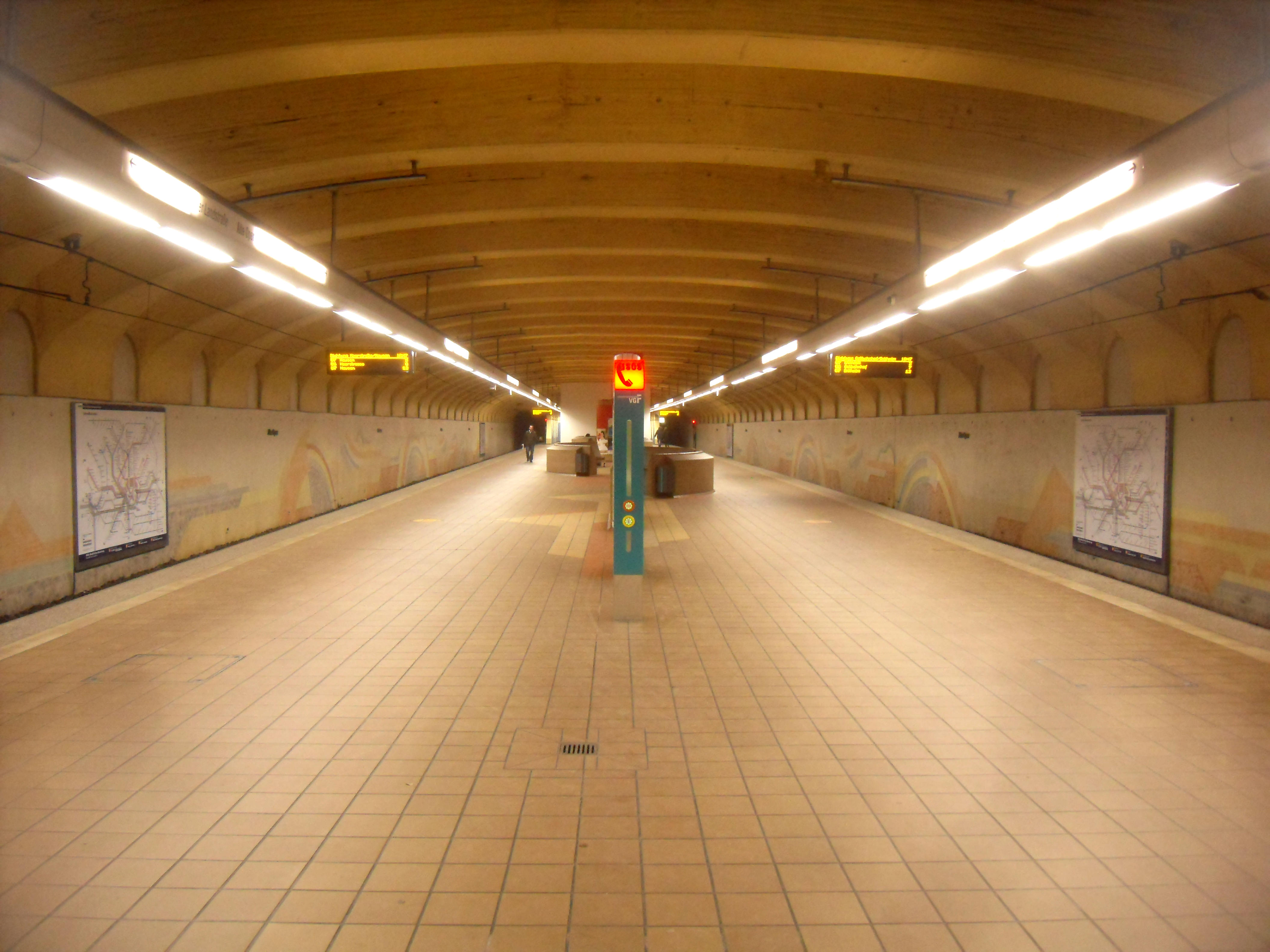
- Platform

General information
- Location: Opernplatz; Innenstadt, Frankfurt am Main; Germany
- Coordinates: 50.1155°N 8.6695°E
- System: Frankfurt U-Bahn station
- Operator: Stadtwerke Verkehrsgesellschaft Frankfurt am Main
- Line: C III
- Platforms: 1 island platform
- Tracks: 2
- Connections: : 64, N7

Construction
- Structure type: Underground
- Cycle facilities: Yes (Call a Bike)
- Accessible: Yes

Other information
- Fare zone: : 5001

History
- Opened: 11 October 1986

Services
Preceding station	Frankfurt U-Bahn	Following station
Westend towards Hausen	U6	Hauptwache towards Frankfurt Ost
Westend towards Praunheim Heerstr.	U7	Hauptwache towards Enkheim
Location

Alte Oper is an underground station on the C Line of the Frankfurt U-Bahn. It is served by the U6 and U7, and is named after and serves the nearby Alte Oper concert hall.

The station was designed by A.C. Walter, and opened on 11 October 1986. It echoes the Alte Oper's Renaissance Revival architecture with its arched, column-free design. It was the first station on the Frankfurt U-Bahn network to be built completely free of columns.

== Location ==
The station is located in the Innenstadt district of the city, under Opernplatz. The eastern entrances, including the station's lift, are located in the square itself, while the western entrances are on Bockenheimer Landstraße, at the intersection with Kettenhofweg.

The Taunusanlage S-Bahn station is located one block south of the square's western edge on Taunusanlage.
