= Börsenstraße =

Street in Frankfurt

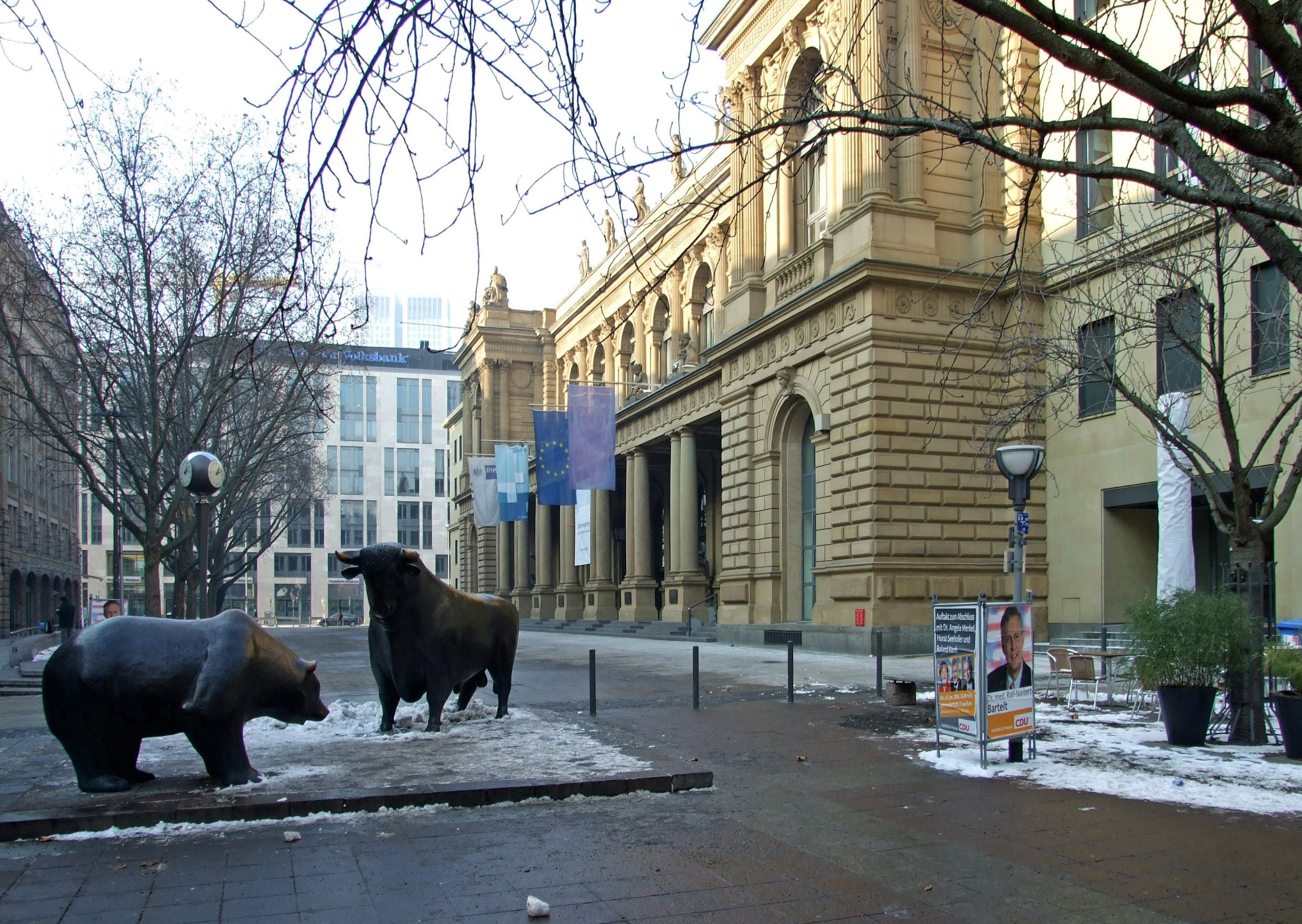
Börsenstraße (Stock Exchange Street) seen from Börsenplatz (Stock Exchange Square), with the Frankfurt Stock Exchange building to the right and the famous bear and bull sculptures in front of the Exchange

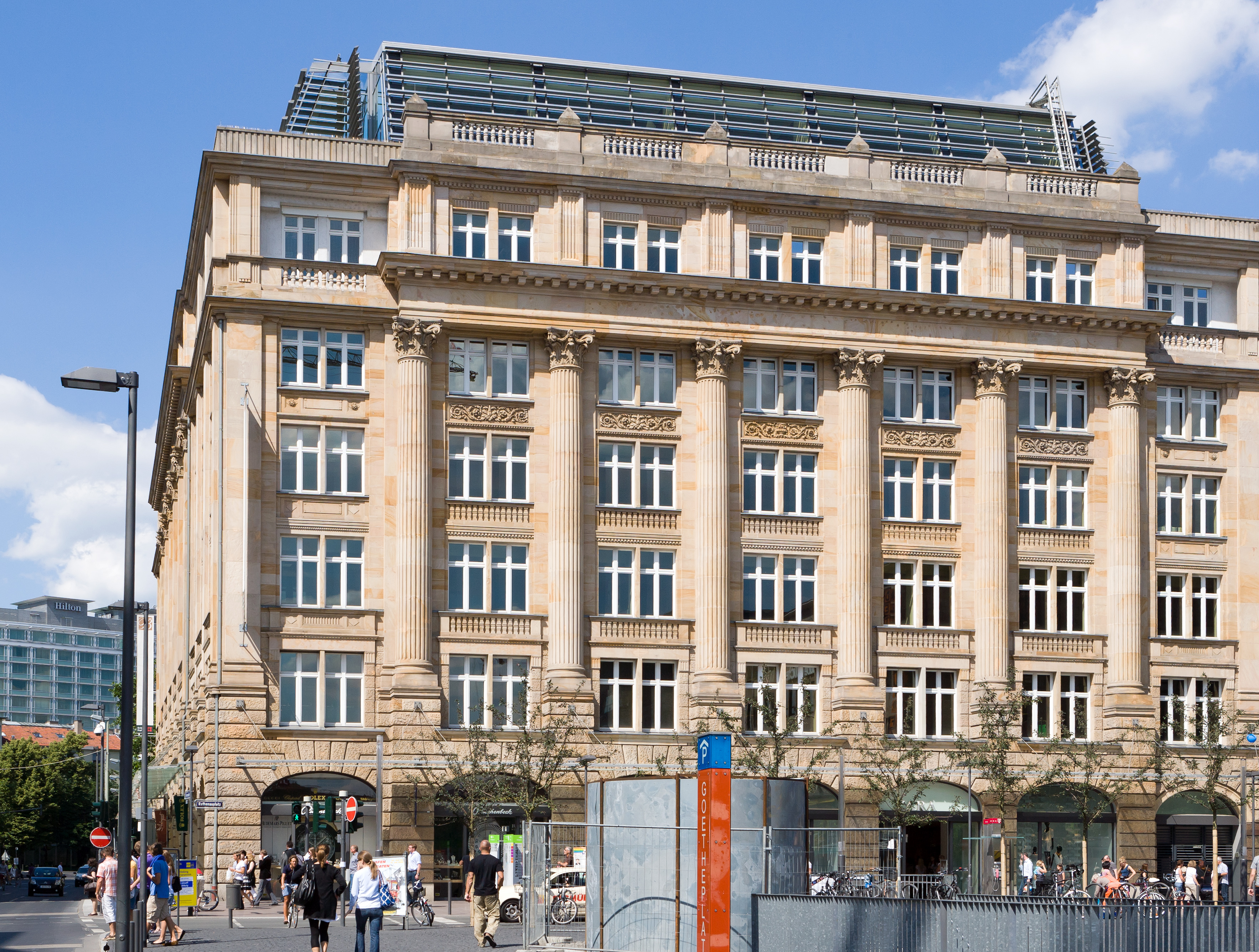
Börsenstraße 2–4

Börsenstraße (literally, "Stock Exchange Street") is a short side street to the Freßgass and Biebergasse major high-end shopping streets in the city centre of Frankfurt, Germany, in the district of Innenstadt and within the central business district known unofficially as the Bankenviertel (Banking District). It is named for the Frankfurt Stock Exchange, which is located here.
