= Opernplatz =

Central city square in Frankfurt

Coordinates: 50°06′55″N 8°40′17″E

The Alte Oper seen from Opernplatz

The Opernplatz (Opera Square) is a central city square in Frankfurt, Germany. It is located in the Innenstadt (Inner City) within the central business district known as the Bankenviertel (Banking District). The Opernplatz is named for the Alte Oper (Old Opera) building, which today serves as a concert hall. The Sofitel Frankfurt Opera hotel is at Opernplatz 14. The Opera Quarter, with some of Germany’s best-known luxury shopping streets, is to the east of Opernplatz.

The seven adjacent streets are:

- Goethestraße, one of Germany's most exclusive shopping streets
- Große Bockenheimer Straße, better known as Freßgass
- Neue Mainzer Straße, leading to the centre of the Bankenviertel
- Hochstraße
- Bockenheimer Anlage
- Taunusanlage (Frankfurt Taunusanlage station)
- Bockenheimer Landstraße
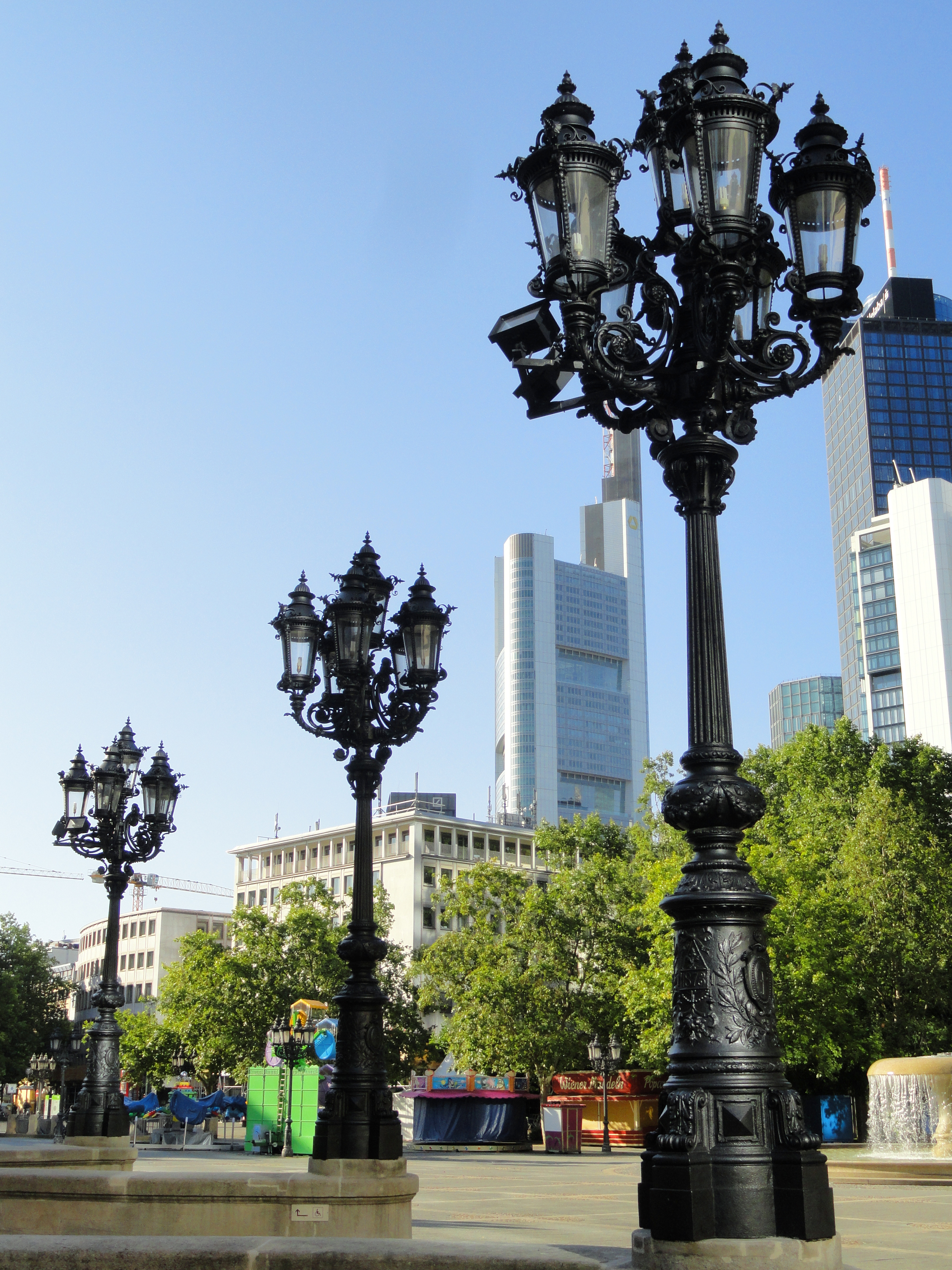
Bankenviertel skyscrapers seen from Opernplatz

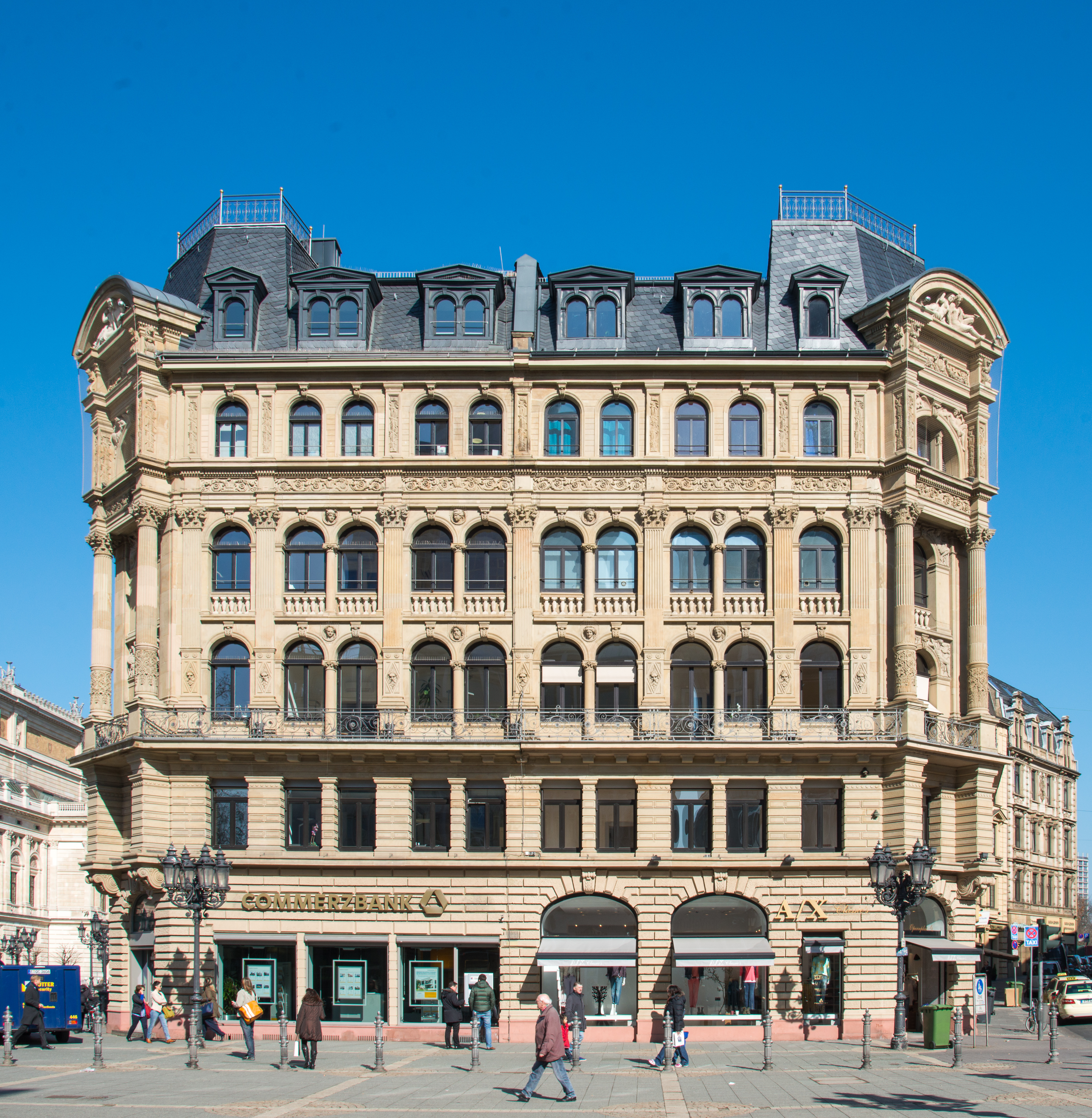
East end of Opernplatz

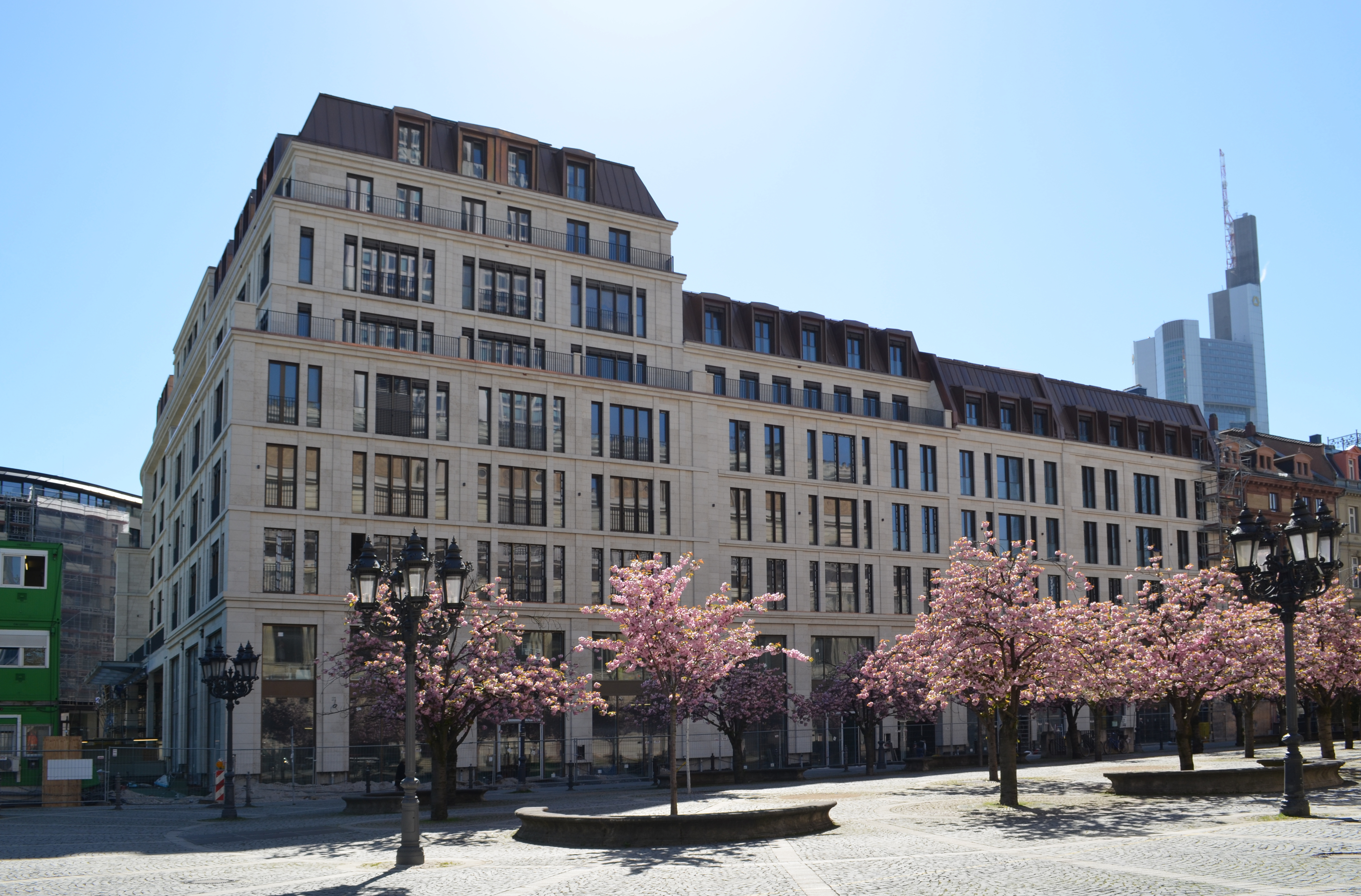
The Sofitel Frankfurt Opera luxury hotel

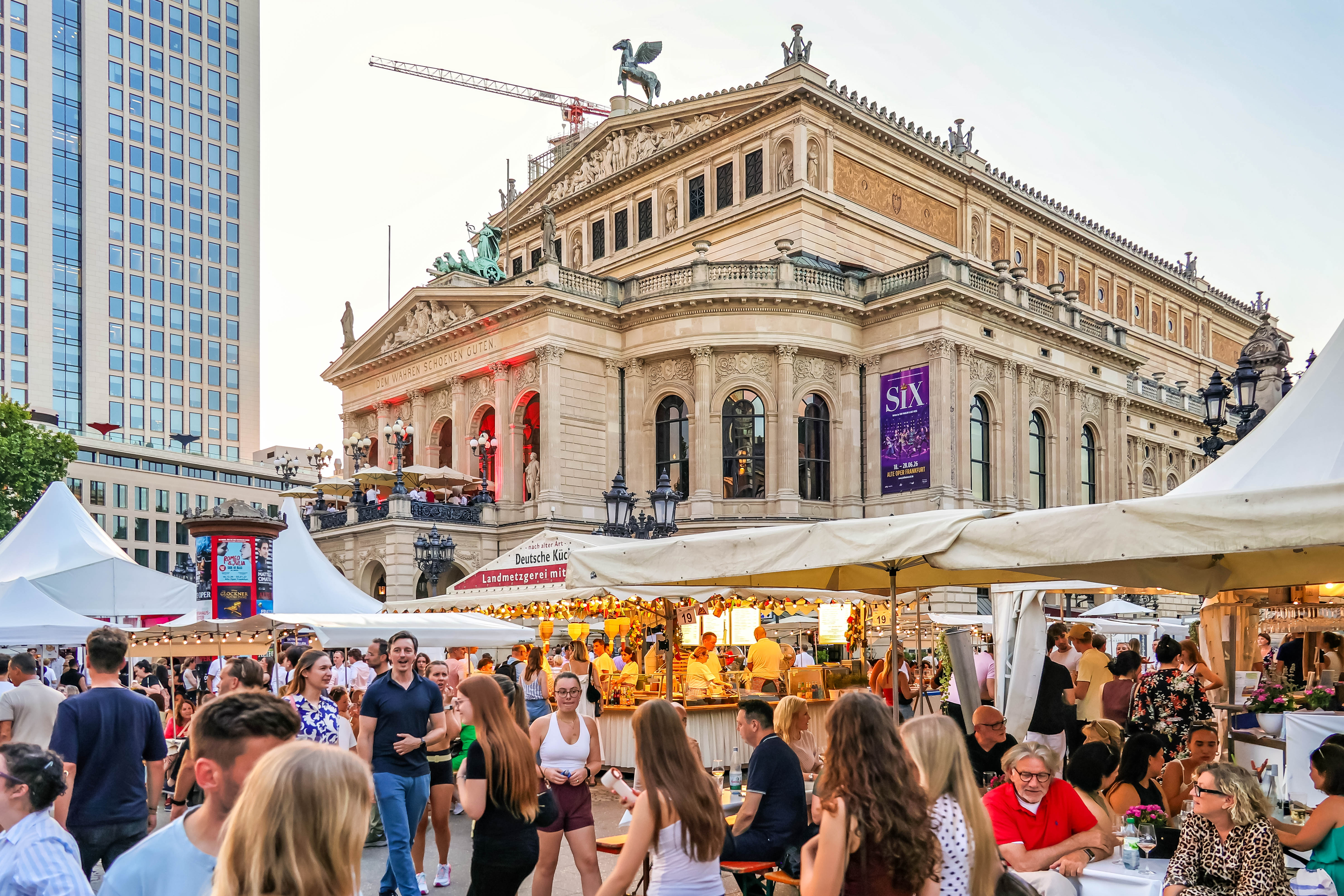
yearly Opera Square Festival
