= Bankenviertel =

Central business district of Frankfurt, Germany

Bankenviertel Frankfurter Bankenviertel
- Central business district (unofficial)
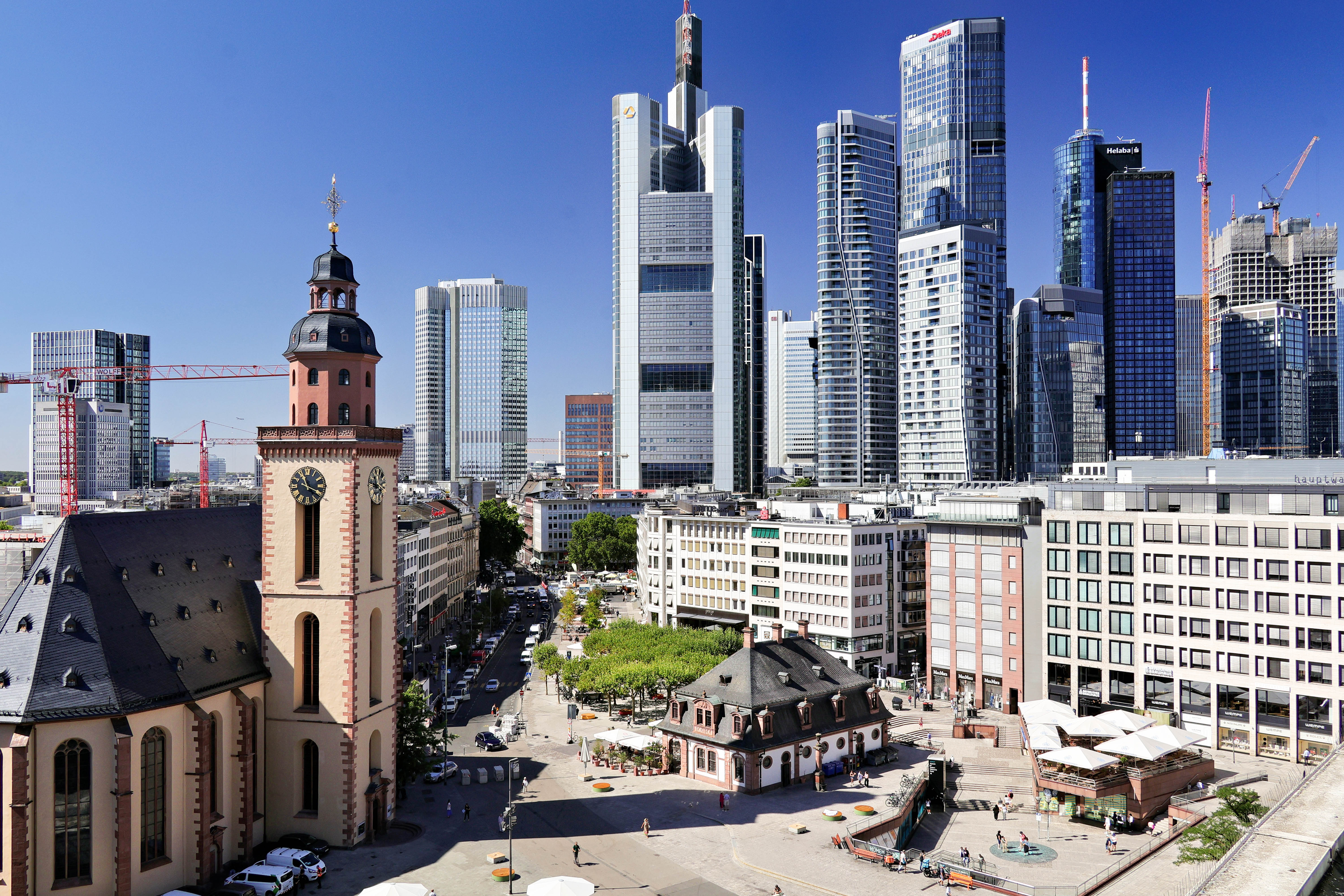
- Bankenviertel with Hauptwache
- The Bankenviertel has no exact borders, but is commonly defined as the western part of the Innenstadt, the southern part of the Westend and the eastern part of the Bahnhofsviertel
- Coordinates: 50°06′44″N 8°40′13″E
- Country: Germany
- State: Hessen
- City: Frankfurt am Main
- District: Innenstadt, Westend, Bahnhofsviertel

Bankenviertel (German pronunciation: [ˈbaŋkŋ̍ˌfɪʁtl̩]; banking quarter) is the name of the unofficial central business district in Frankfurt, Germany that hosts a lot of office buildings of banks, insurance companies, law firms and other financial institutions. It is one of the largest in Europe and the most important German financial hub.

Having no official or strict borders, it is commonly defined as the western part of the Innenstadt, the southern part of the Westend and the eastern part of the Bahnhofsviertel. Its most central square is the Opernplatz.

== Location ==
The Bankenviertel is not an official city district and has no official or strictly defined borders. It stretches across three city districts: the western part of the Innenstadt, the southern part of the Westend and the eastern part of the Bahnhofsviertel. Many of the largest banks in Germany, e.g. Deutsche Bank, DZ Bank, Commerzbank and Helaba, have their corporate headquarters here, as well as many representation offices of foreign banks. It is also the place where most of Frankfurts high-rises and skyscrapers are located, which gave it also the nicknames Bankfurt and Mainhattan.

The heart of the Bankenviertel is located on both sides of the Taunus- and Gallusanlage, an inner-city parkway, and the surrounding streets (Neue Mainzer Straße, Junghofstraße, Kaiserstraße), and the central square of the Bankenviertel is the Opernplatz. Furthermore, the area on both sides of the Mainzer Landstraße from Taunusanlage to Platz der Republik and the Bockenheimer Landstraße, beginning at the Opernplatz, are part of the area. The Bankenviertel also includes the areas near the Opernplatz on its eastern side, notably the Frankfurt Stock Exchange 300 meters (980 ft) east of the Opernplatz, as well as a number of banks in its immediate vicinity.

== Financial institutions ==
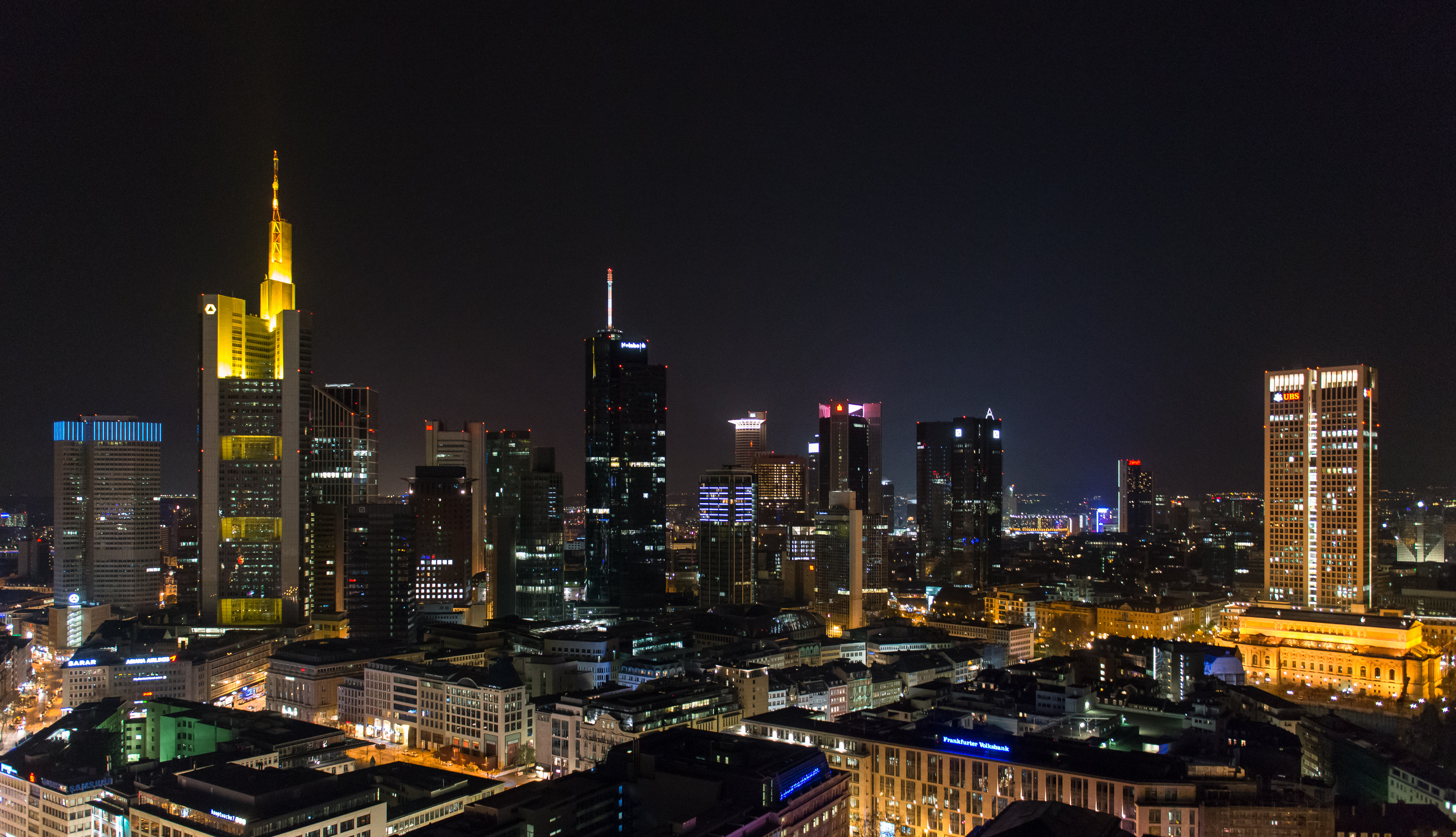
Skyline at night

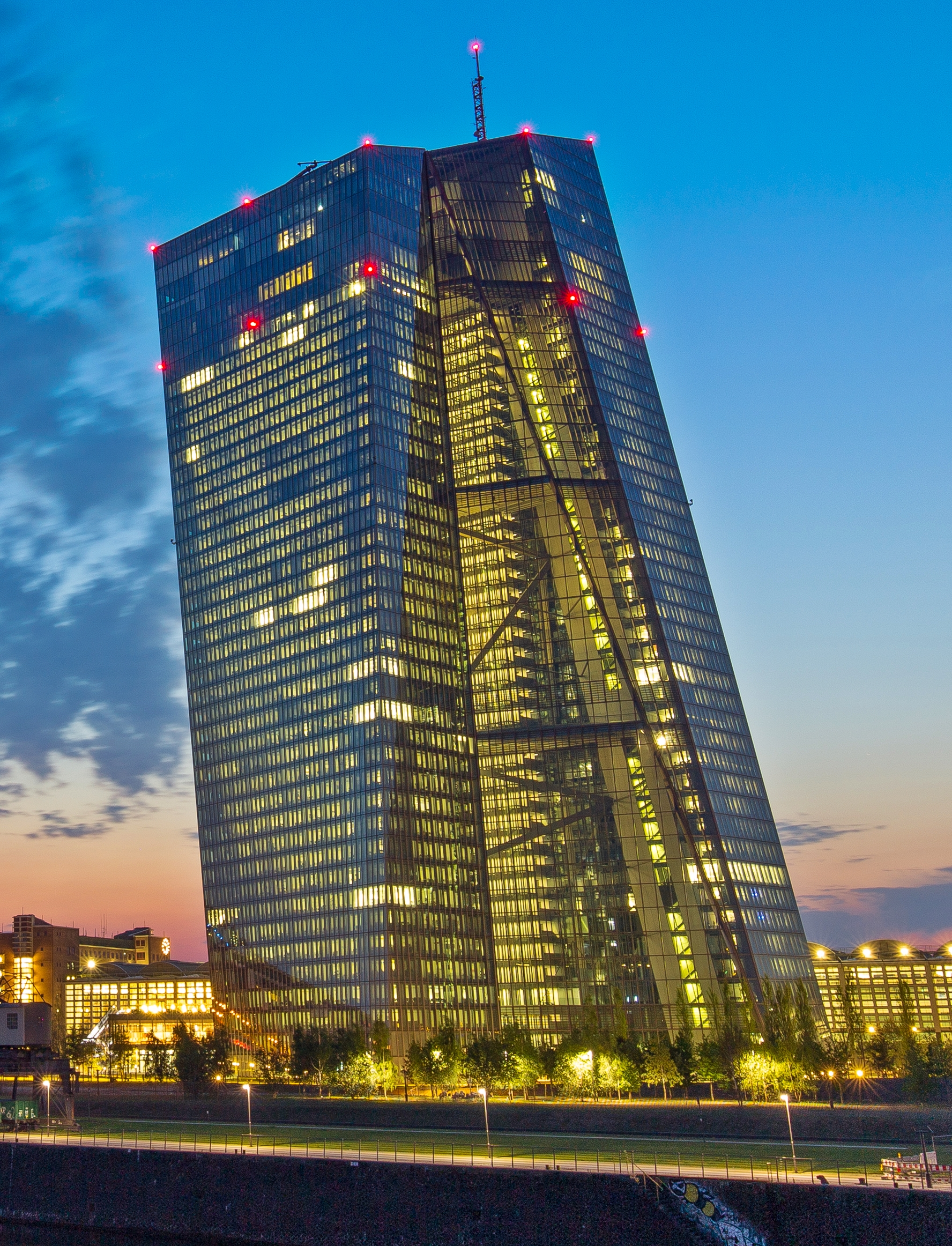
European Central Bank

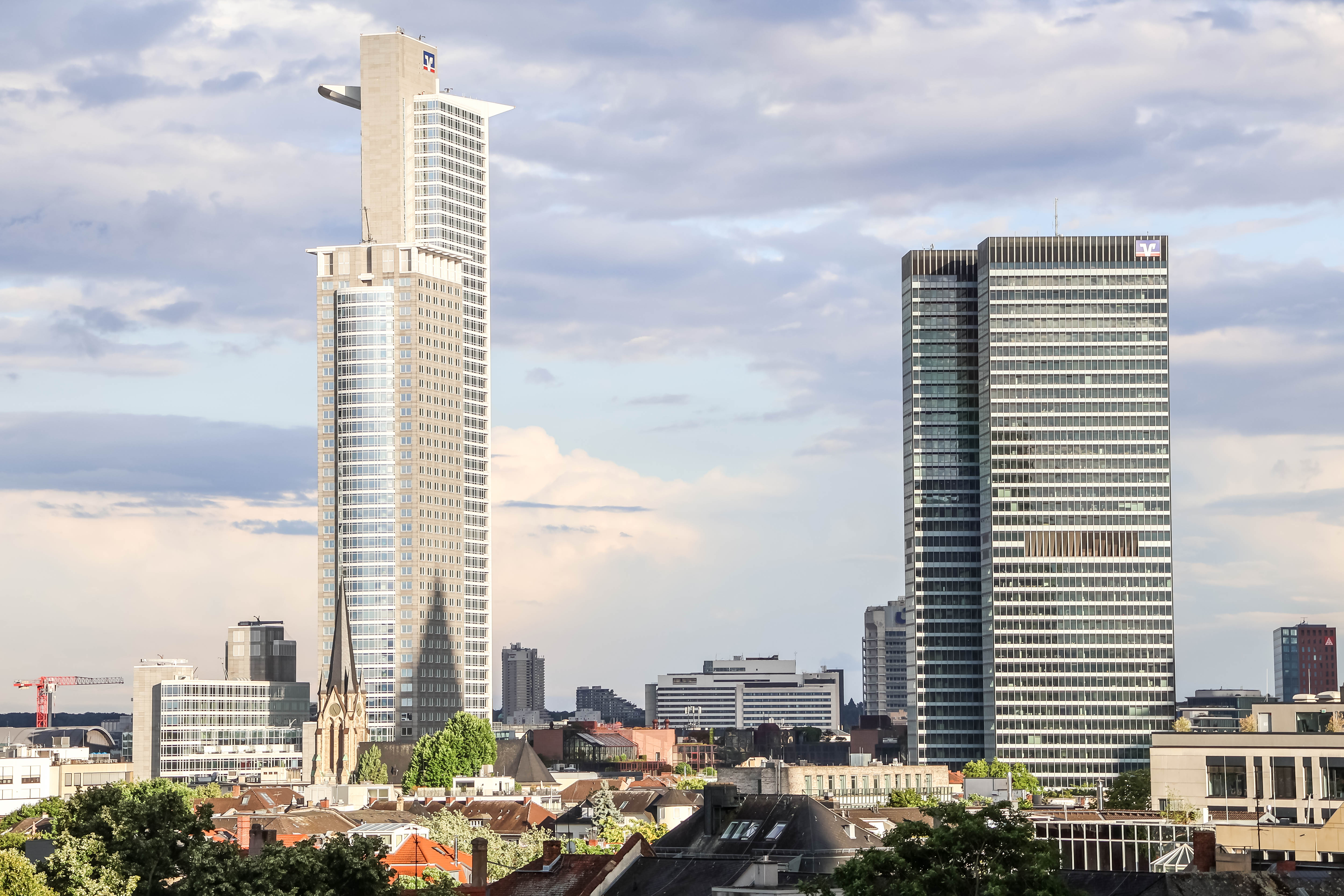
DZ Bank (Westendstraße 1 and City-Haus I

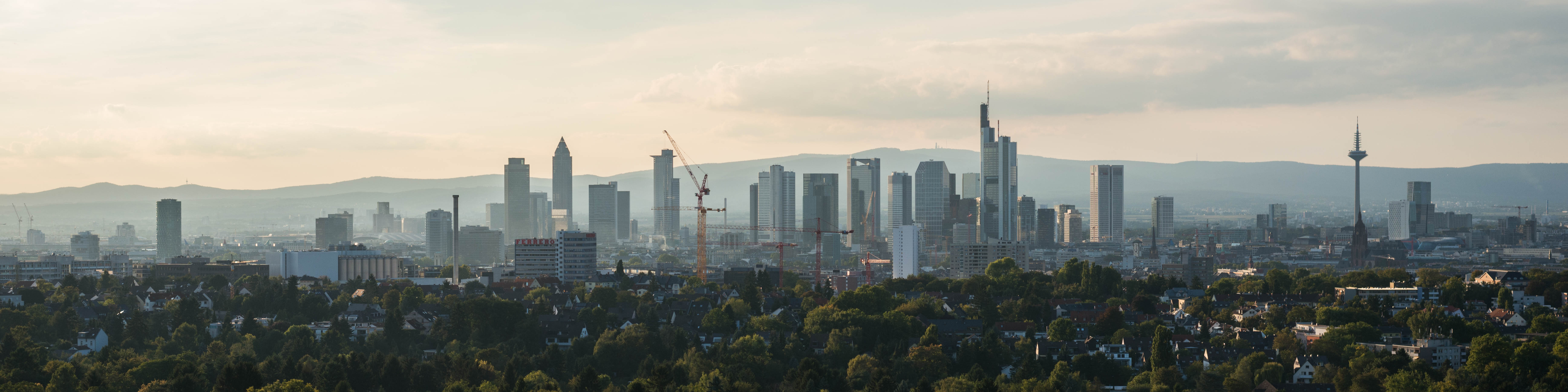
View from the former Goethe Tower in the south

Financial Institution	Building	Street	City district
Bank of America	Main Tower	Neue Mainzer Straße 52–58	Innenstadt
Bank of China	Westend Duo	Bockenheimer Landstraße 24	Westend-Süd
Bank of Communications	Bürohaus an der Alten Oper	Neue Mainzer Straße 69–75	Innenstadt
Bank of Scotland	Japan Center	Taunustor 2	Innenstadt
Berenberg Bank	BoLa 25	Bockenheimer Landstraße 25	Westend-Süd
BHF Bank	BHF-Bank-Hochhaus	Bockenheimer Landstraße 10	Westend-Süd
Commerzbank	Commerzbank Tower; Gallileo	Große Gallusstraße 17–19; Gallusanlage 7	Innenstadt; Bahnhofsviertel
Crédit Agricole	Main Building	Taunusanlage 14–19	Westend-Süd
Credit Suisse	Junghof Plaza	Junghofstraße 16	Innenstadt
DekaBank	Trianon; Skyper	Mainzer Landstraße 16–24; Taunusanlage 1	Westend-Süd; Bahnhofsviertel
Deutsche Bank	Deutsche Bank Twin Towers; Deutsche Bank IBCF	Taunusanlage 12; Große Gallusstraße 10–14	Westend-Süd; Innenstadt
DZ Bank	Westend Tower; City-Haus	Westendstraße 1 Platz der Republik 6	Westend-Süd; Westend-Süd
European Central Bank	Eurotower; Bürohaus Neue Mainzer Straße 32–36	Willy-Brandt-Platz 2 Neue Mainzer Straße 66–68; Neue Mainzer Straße 32–36	Innenstadt; Innenstadt; Innenstadt
Helaba	Main Tower	Neue Mainzer Straße 52–58	Innenstadt
HSBC Trinkaus	Skyper	Taunusanlage 1	Bahnhofsviertel
Houlihan Lokey	Skyper	Taunusanlage 1	Bahnhofsviertel
ICICI Bank		Mainzer Landstraße 69	Bahnhofsviertel
JPMorgan Chase & Co.	Junghof Plaza	Junghofstraße 14	Innenstadt
Merrill Lynch	Main Tower	Neue Mainzer Straße 52–58	Innenstadt
Metzler Bank	Metzler-Haus	Große Gallusstraße 18	Innenstadt
Mizuho Financial Group	Japan Center	Taunustor 2	Innenstadt
Morgan Stanley	Omniturm	Große Gallusstraße 18	Innenstadt
Nordea	Westend Windows	Bockenheimer Landstraße 33–35	Westend-Süd
Royal Bank of Scotland		Junghofstraße 22	Innenstadt
SEB		Ulmenstraße 30	Westend-Süd
Société Générale	Garden Tower	Neue Mainzer Straße 46–50	Innenstadt
Standard & Poor's	Main Tower	Neue Mainzer Straße 52–58	Innenstadt
The Bank of Tokyo-Mitsubishi UFJ		Junghofstraße 24	Innenstadt
UBS	Opernturm	Bockenheimer Landstraße 2–4	Westend-Süd
UniCredit		Mainzer Landstraße 23	Bahnhofsviertel

== Public transport ==
The Bankenviertel is very well accessible with the public transport system. Eight of nine suburban S-Bahn lines (S1-S6, S8, S9) serve the stations Hauptwache, Taunusanlage and Frankfurt Central Station. All inner-city U-Bahn lines have stops within the area: U1-U3 at Willy-Brandt-Platz and Hauptwache, U4 and U5 at Willy-Brandt-Platz and Frankfurt Central Station, U6 and U7 at Hauptwache and Alte Oper. The tram lines 11 and 12 stop at Frankfurt Central Station and Willy-Brandt-Platz, and the lines 16 and 17 link the central station and the Frankfurt Trade Fair area.

== See also ==
Other business districts in Europe

- City of London
- La Defense
- Moscow International Business Center
- Śródmieście, Warsaw

Building comparisons

- List of tallest buildings in Frankfurt
- List of tallest buildings in Germany
- List of tallest buildings in Europe
