= Palais Quartier =

Building complex in the Innenstadt district of Frankfurt, Germany

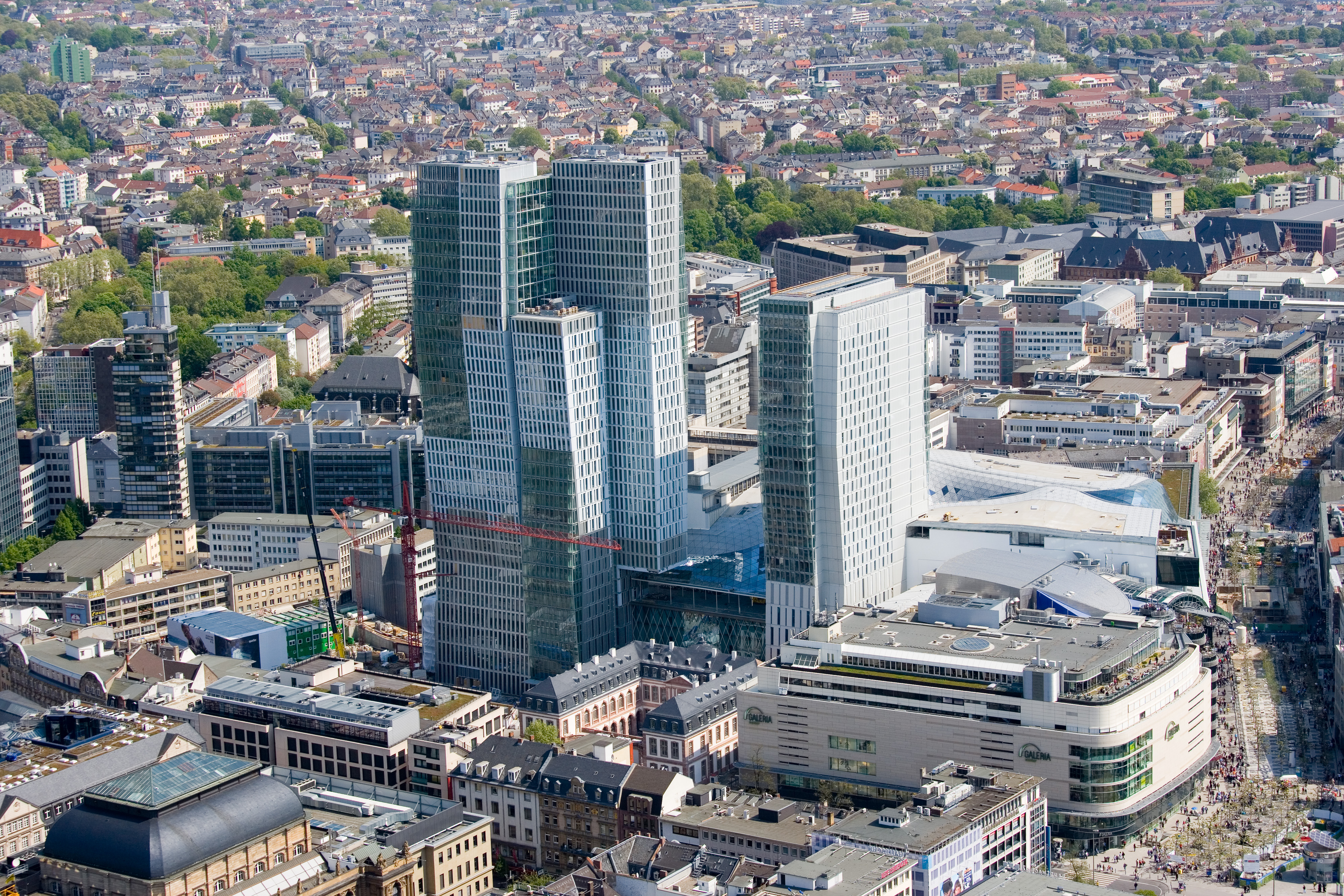
- Palais Quartier seen from the Main Tower
- Interactive map of the Palais Quartier area

General information
- Status: Completed
- Type: Mixed-use: Office / Hotel
- Location: Frankfurt, Germany, 46 Mainzer Landstraße, Frankfurt am Main, Germany
- Coordinates: 50.1147°N 8.68139°E
- Construction started: 2004
- Completed: 2010

Height
- Roof: 136 m (446 ft) (tallest (Nextower)

Technical details
- Lifts/elevators: ThyssenKrupp

Design and construction
- Architect: KSP Jürgen Engel Architekten
- Developer: MAB & Meyer Bergmann
- Structural engineer: KHP Konig und Heunisch Planungsgesellschaft
- Main contractor: Züblin

Website
- Palaisquartier

The Palais Quartier (German: [paˈleː kvaʁˌtiːɐ̯]), formerly known as the FrankfurtHochVier, is a mixed-use building complex in the Innenstadt district of Frankfurt, Germany. Built between 2004 and 2011, the complex consists of two high-rise buildings from which the tallest (Nextower) stands at 136 m (446 ft) tall, a shopping center and a historic palace.

== History ==
=== Planning ===
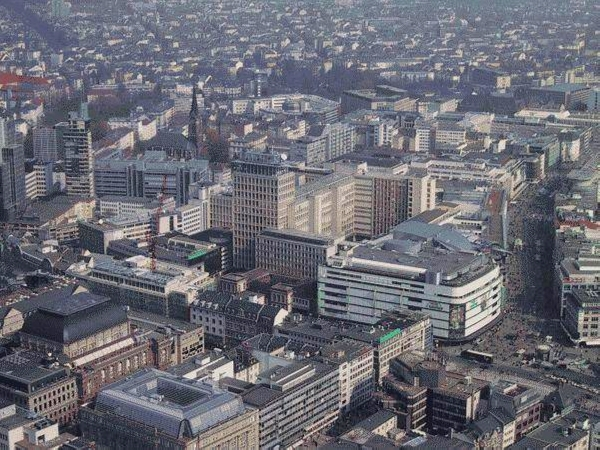
The former postal/telecommunications site (2003, since demolished)

The property known as the "Post Area" was sold by Deutsche Telekom to the Dutch investor MAB in February 2002 for 230 million euros. In the same year, the architectural firm KSP Engel und Zimmermann Architekten emerged as the winner of the urban development competition for the construction project. Initial plans called for construction of the new buildings to begin in July 2004 at the latest and to be completed by the end of 2006. After a series of delays, the shopping center was finally opened on February 26, 2009. The new buildings of the Palais Thurn und Taxis and the two high-rise buildings were completed and occupied during 2011. The planned investment sum for the entire project was initially around 800 million euros, but the total costs are now estimated at around 960 million euros.

For the construction project, the former main post office and the 69-meter-high telecommunications tower, one of the first skyscrapers in Frankfurt, dating from 1956, were demolished, among other things. The Rundschau building on the directly adjacent site was also demolished. This 5500 square meter site, which is not part of Palais Quartier, was sold by the Druck- und Verlagshaus Frankfurt to the Dutch company MAB in June 2005 after 33 months of negotiations. This company, or rather its parent company Bouwfonds, then developed the building complex in a joint venture with the Dutch company MeyerBergmann. The foundation stone for the project was laid in September 2005. After the Rundschau building was demolished in 2006, it was initially used for construction site logistics for the Palais Quartier. Designs for the new building were presented by Langhof Architekten in 2006, but new construction has not yet begun.

Palais Quartier is located on a 1.7-acre (0.69 ha) area between Frankfurt's main shopping street, the Zeil, and the historic Eschenheim Tower.

== Architecture ==
The site had been used for decades by Deutsche Post as the main post office in Frankfurt. It was sold to an investor in 2002 and plans were made for a new building complex including a large shopping mall because the site borders the Zeil, Frankfurt's top-selling shopping street. The demolition of the old post buildings, including one of Frankfurt's first high rise buildings, the 69-meter (226 ft)-high Fernmeldehochhaus, began in 2004, but legal disputes delayed the construction works for several months.

The complex consists of four buildings:

- MyZeil, a shopping mall with a gross leaseable area of 77,000 sq m
- Palais Thurn und Taxis, a reconstruction of a palace from 1793 which had been badly damaged in World War II
- Nextower, a 136-meter (446 ft)-high rise office building with a floor area of 48,000 sq m
- JW Marriott Frankfurt (Jumeirah Frankfurt until April 2022), a 99-meter (325 ft)-high rise hotel building with 271 units

Beneath the complex lies the largest underground car park in Frankfurt's city centre with 1,396 parking positions.

=== Palais Thurn und Taxis ===
The Thurn and Taxis Palace on Große Eschenheimer Strasse, which gave the entire complex its name, was rebuilt based on a historical model. It is not a faithful reconstruction, but rather a smaller copy of the original late Baroque city palace that was destroyed in the air raids on Frankfurt in 1944. The remaining gatehouses were demolished, but their sandstone ornaments were reused in the building.

Unlike before, the new palace is free-standing on all sides, so that the two side wings of the Cour d'honneur now have north and south facing sides, which they did not have before because of the side courtyards. These facades were completely redesigned. Finally, the garden facade of the Corps de logis also had to be completely redesigned to adapt it to the changed cubature of the reconstruction. The building is a reinforced concrete structure with a roof made of steel struts, but from the outside it still appears to be a historical building.

In addition to a multifunctional hall for around 1,000 people in the basement, retail and upscale restaurants on the ground floor, it houses offices on the upper floors.

=== Nextower ===
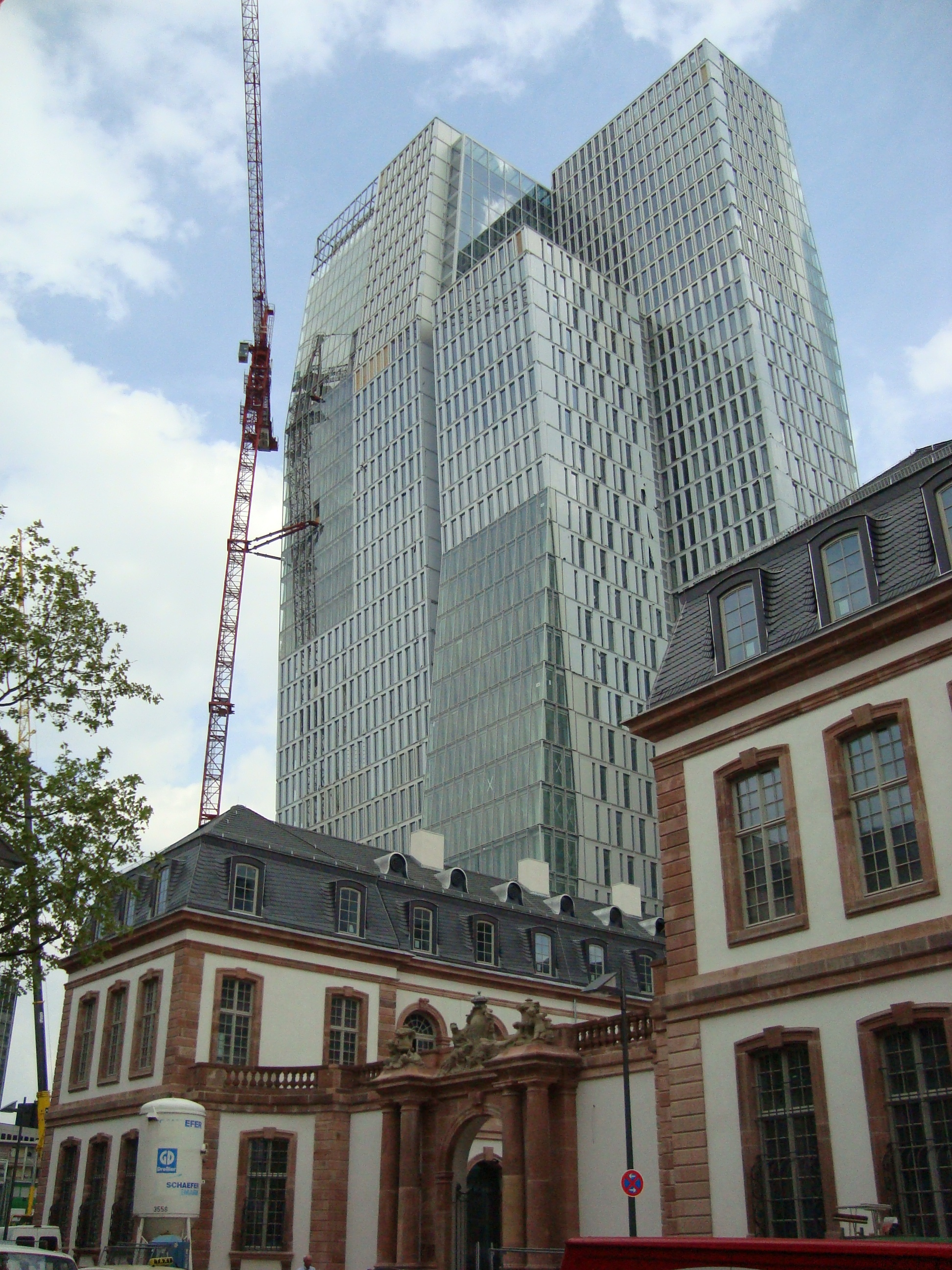
Palais Thurn und Taxis and Nextower (April 2009)

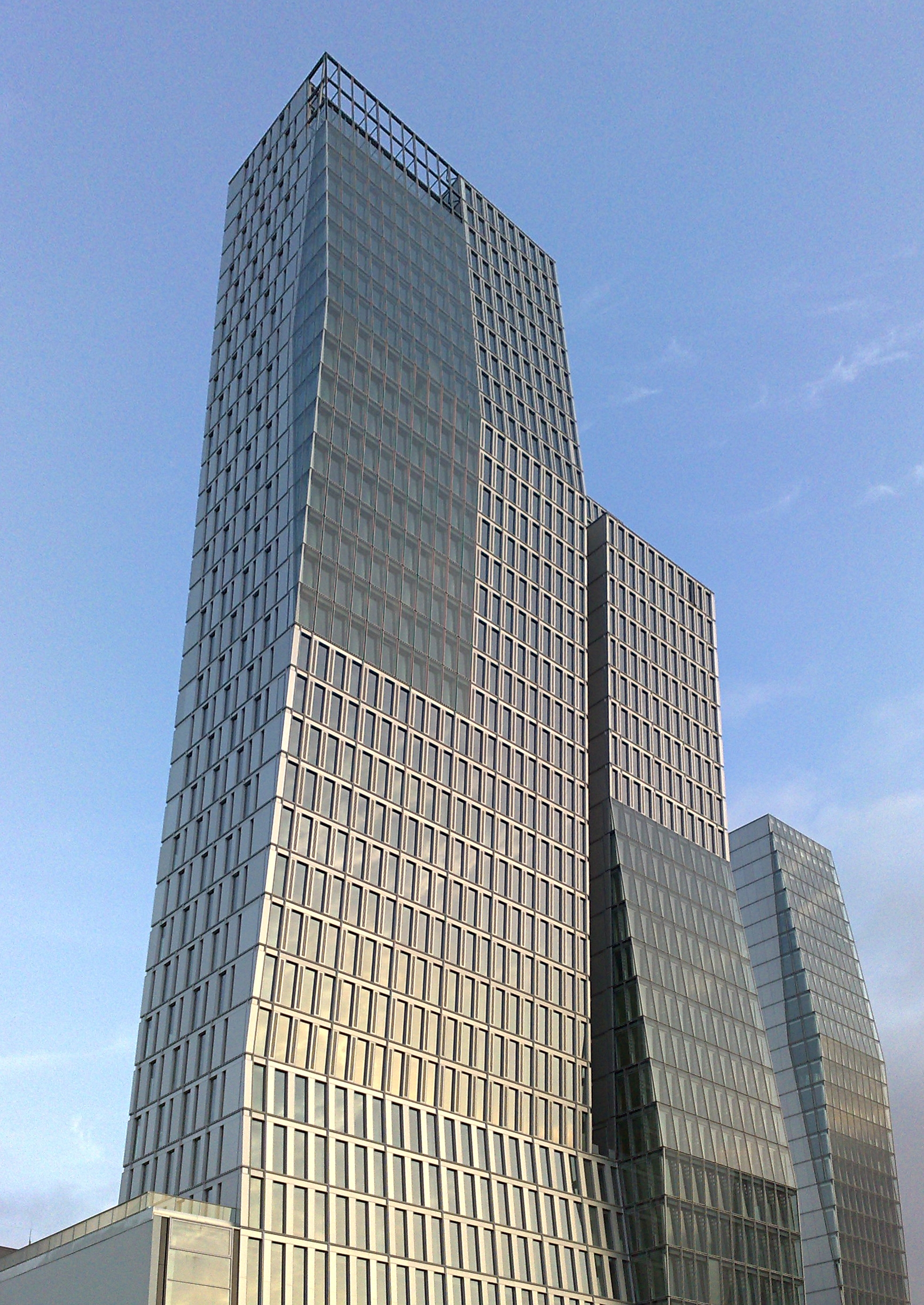
Nextower and Jumeirah Hotel (February 2010)

Behind the reconstruction of the palace, at the newly built Thurn-und-Taxis-Platz 6, stands a 136-meter-high skyscraper, also designed by KSP Engel and Zimmermann. It has slightly deconstructivist- style bent facades made of matt shimmering aluminum and glass. The office tower has a total area of 48,000 m² on 32 floors. The lobby and several conference rooms are on the lower floors, and the fourth floor has direct access to the adjacent MyZeil shopping center. At a height of 90 meters, there are two roof terraces, although these are not open to the public. The building was occupied in autumn 2011, and the first tenants were a law firm and a management consultancy. Other tenants, such as COLLECTION Flexible Workspaces and Match Office, followed.

=== Hotel Jumeirah Frankfurt ===
Next to the Nextower, there is another high-rise building with 25 floors and a height of 96 metres at Thurn-und-Taxis-Platz 2. In April 2009, a lease agreement was signed with the international hotel chain Jumeirah Group from Dubai, and in August 2011 the Hotel Jumeirah Frankfurt was opened after extensive interior work. The luxury hotel with 217 rooms and suites is the first hotel of the Jumeirah Group in Germany and the third hotel in Europe after London with two Jumeirah Hotels. The hotel has a 364 m² ballroom on the third floor, a Talise Spa with separate saunas for men and women, a presidential suite and the modern grill room restaurant "Max on One" on the first floor.

In February 2022, it was announced that Jumeirah was withdrawing from Frankfurt. From April 2022, the hotel will be operated by JW Marriott, which opened the first hotel of the Marriott luxury brand "JW" in Germany.

=== MyZeil shopping center ===
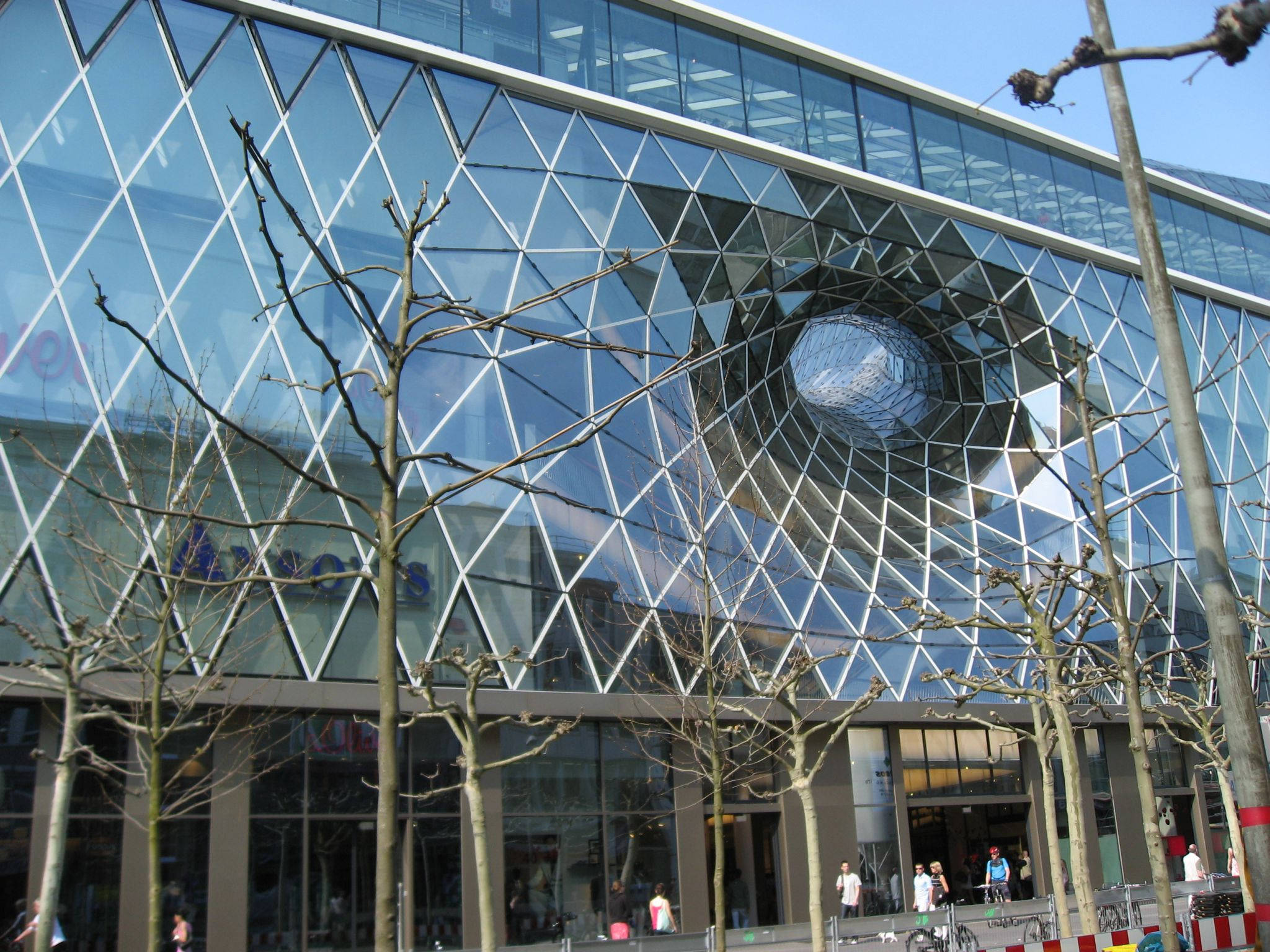
MyZeil entrance seen from the Zeil

The MyZeil shopping center, designed by Massimiliano Fuksas, forms the pedestrian connection from Thurn-und-Taxis-Platz to the Zeil shopping mile. Over 100 shops are spread over six floors on 47,000 square meters of sales area. The largest tenants include a Rewe market in the basement, the men's clothing store Anson's on three floors, the Fitness First fitness studio and the electronics and household appliance store Saturn on the third and fourth floors. MyZeil also houses a branch of the Californian fashion company Hollister, at the time the first in continental Europe .

Architectural features of the building include the organically shaped glass roof, the trunk-like glass rainwater drain to the Zeil and the 46-meter-long “Express” escalator that leads from the ground floor directly to the fourth floor, the “Gastro Boulevard”.

== See also ==
- List of tallest buildings in Frankfurt
- List of tallest buildings in Germany
- List of shopping malls in Germany
