= Innenstadt (Frankfurt am Main) =

- Quarter of Frankfurt am Main
- Coat of arms

- Location of the Innenstadt (red) and the Ortsbezirk Innenstadt I (light red) within Frankfurt am Main
- Interactive map of Innenstadt
- Location within Germany Location within Hesse
- Coordinates: 50°07′13″N 08°40′58″E
- Country: Germany
- State: Hesse
- Admin. region: Darmstadt
- District: Urban district
- City: Frankfurt am Main

Area
  - Total: 1.554 km^{2} (0.600 sq mi)

Population (2020-12-31)
  - Total: 6,550
  - Density: 4,210/km^{2} (10,900/sq mi)
- Time zone: UTC+01:00 (CET)
  - Summer (DST): UTC+02:00 (CEST)
- Postal codes: 60313, 60311
- Dialling codes: 069
- Vehicle registration: F
- Website: www.frankfurt.de

The Innenstadt (German pronunciation: [ˈɪnənˌʃtat], lit. 'Inner City') is the central city district of Frankfurt am Main, Germany. It is part of the Ortsbezirk Innenstadt I. Its western part forms part of Frankfurt's central business district, the Bankenviertel. Germany's most expensive shopping streets and real estate are found within the city district.

The Innenstadt stretches in the north and east round the district of Altstadt. Other adjacent districts to the west are Bahnhofsviertel, in the north west the Westend, Nordend to the north and Ostend to the east. In the south, the Innenstadt is bordered naturally by the Main on the opposite bank of which stands the Applewine quarter known as Sachsenhausen.

The Innenstadt and Altstadt were formed within the borders made up of the Anlagen (stretches of grassy park land) lying to the right of the Main and are thereby clearly recognisable on the city plan.

The enclosures of park land of a contrast to the skyscrapers and the banking quarter. The Zeil, Frankfurt's most famous street, as well as the central squares Hauptwache and Konstablerwache, the Frankfurt Stock Exchange and the Alte Oper, can be found in the Innenstadt. On the Freßgass the bankers and office workers from the nearby office blocks often have lunch.

== Areas and quarter, streets and squares ==
The Innenstadt is divided, from west to east, in into the following parts:

=== Altstadt ===
The Altstadt is the historical old town district of Frankfurt. It was devastated in World War II, but parts of it are reconstructed, most recently at the Dom-Römer Project.

=== Bankenviertel ===
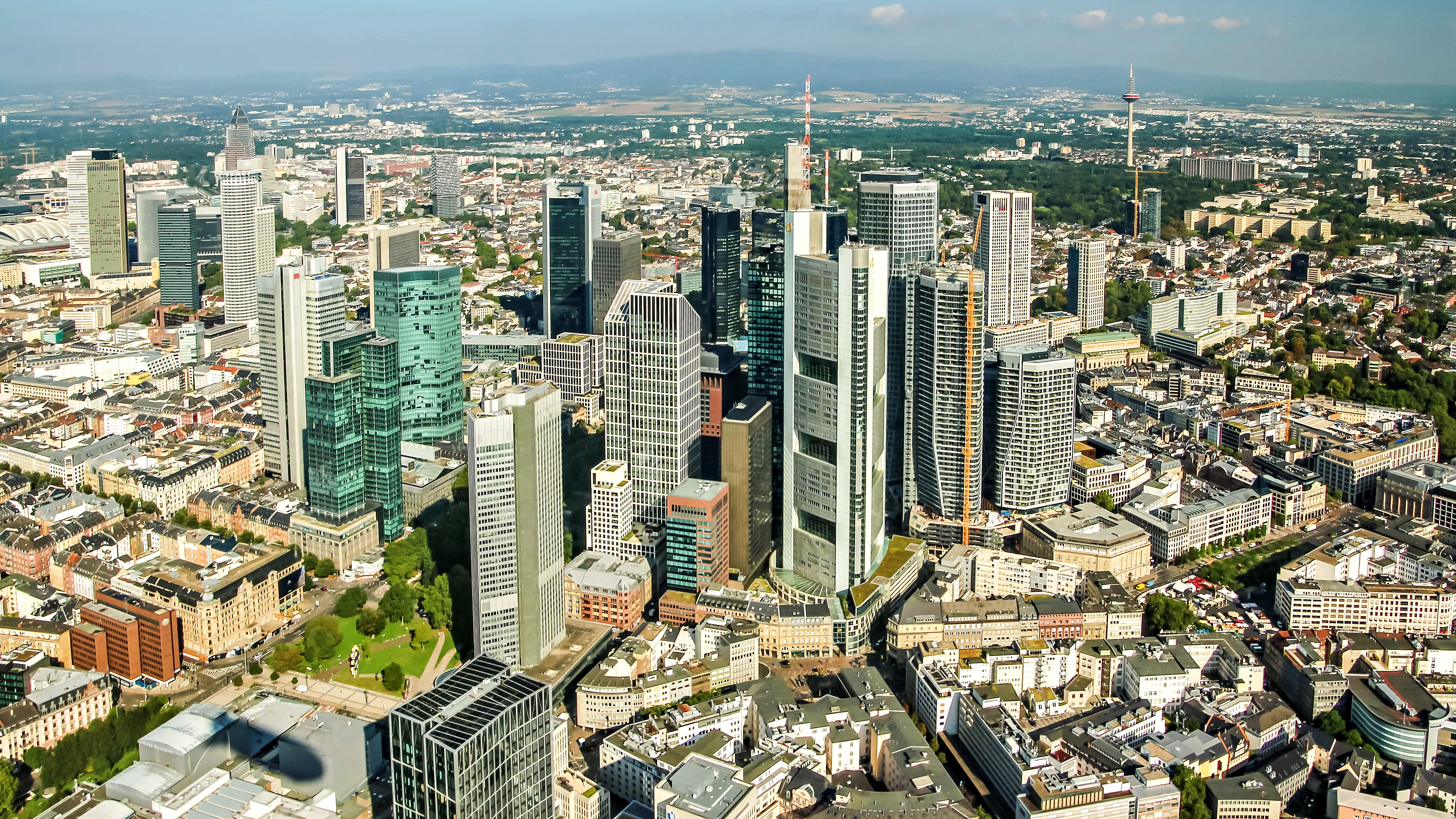
Bankenviertel (2024)

The Bankenviertel (banking district) lies on both sides of the Taunusanlage and is shared between the boroughs of the Innenstadt, Bahnhofsviertel and the Westend. Most credit institutes in the eastern banking quarter are situated in Neue Mainzer Straße, Große Gallusstraße, Junghofstraße and the surrounding streets. All these streets are locations for skyscrapers, whose highest is the 259-metre Commerzbank Tower.

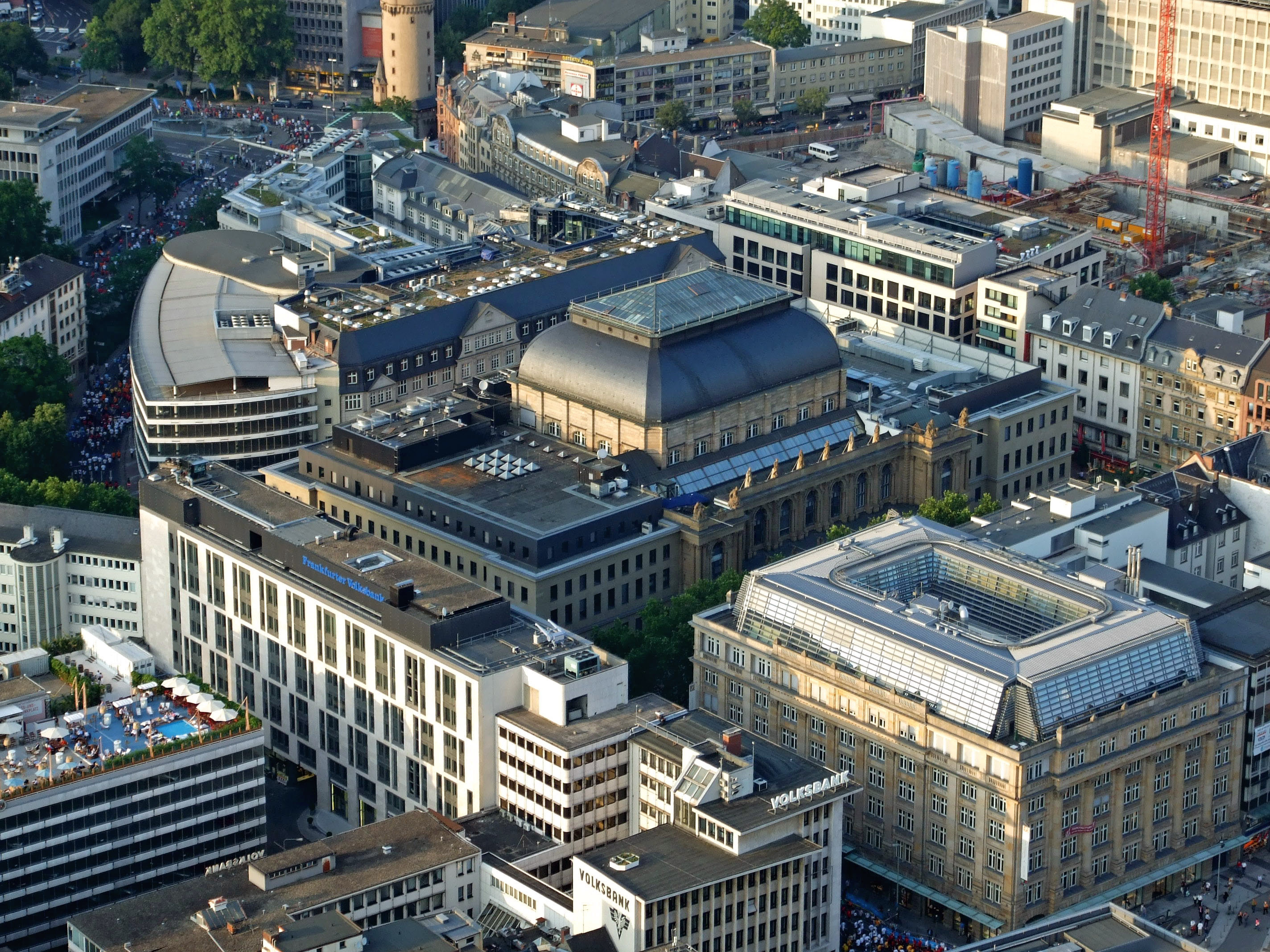
Frankfurt Stock Exchange

The southern part of the quarter shows a greater range of use, especially along Kaiserstraße and at Kaiserplatz. The Frankfurter Hof, one of the best known hotels in the city, is located here. In Großer Hirschgraben, the border with the Altstadt, lies one of the cultural highlights of the city, the Goethe House.

=== Opernviertel ===
The main axis of the north western part of the Innenstadt (opera quarter) is Große Bockenheimer Straße, running from Rathenauplatz to Opernplatz, as a result of the many places to eat better known as the Freßgass. The southern Goethestraße which runs parallel to the Freßgass is the most expensive shopping street in the city. To the north Kaiserhofstraße, another expensive street, borders Freßgass. The Opernplatz which lies within the parks of the old city walls is considered to be one of the most beautiful squares in the city. The Frankfurt Stock Exchange lies in the shopping street called Schillerstraße.

The successive squares Rathenauplatz, Goetheplatz and Roßmarkt form the intersection to the neighbouring quarters around the Zeil.

The streets around the Freßgass are one of the focus points of Frankfurt's nightlife. In Kleine Bockenheimer Straße is the Jazzkeller (jazz cellar), an important cultural institution offering live jazz with local and internationally renowned musicians.

=== Zeil and surroundings ===
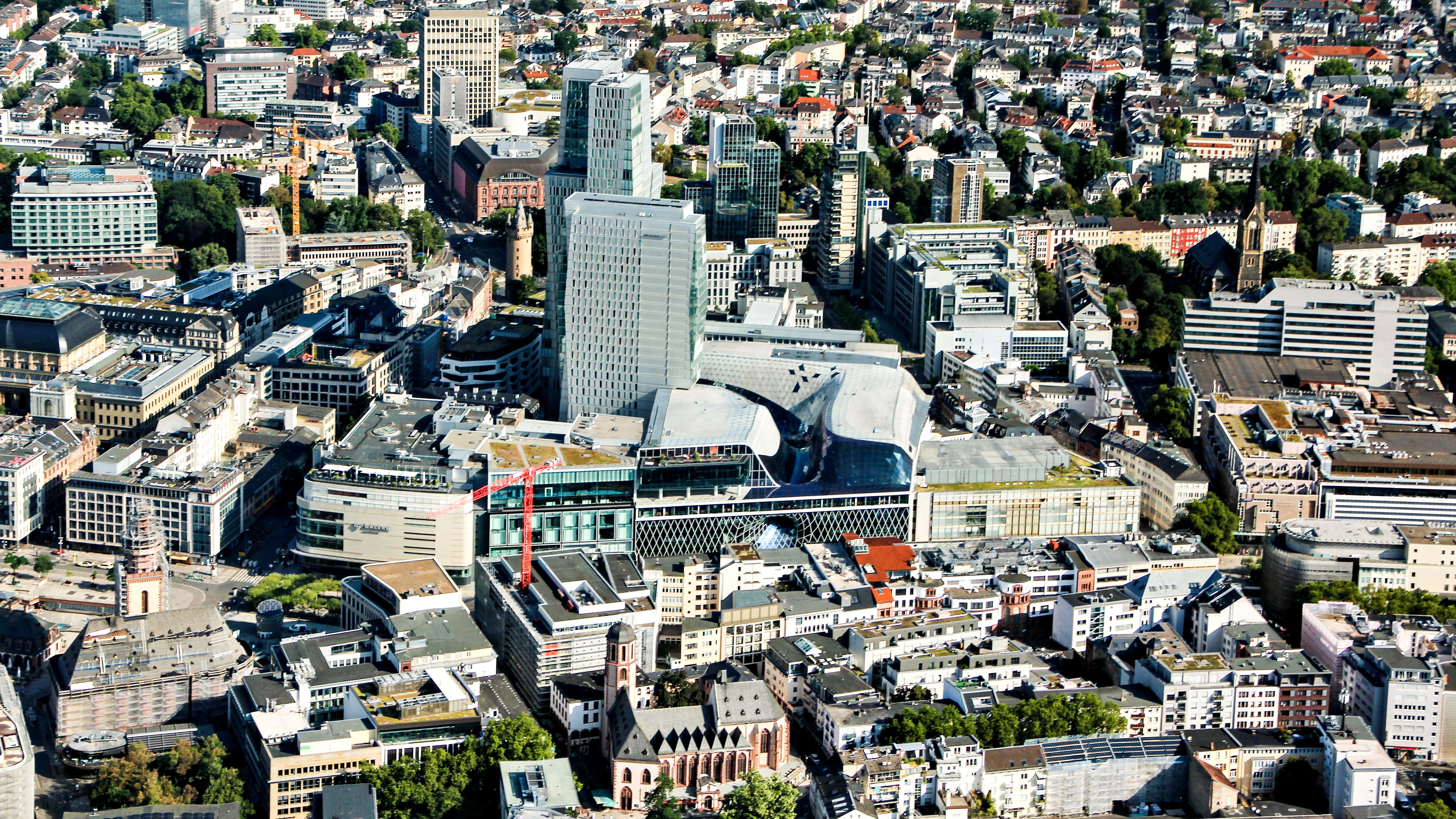
End of the Zeil at Hauptwache

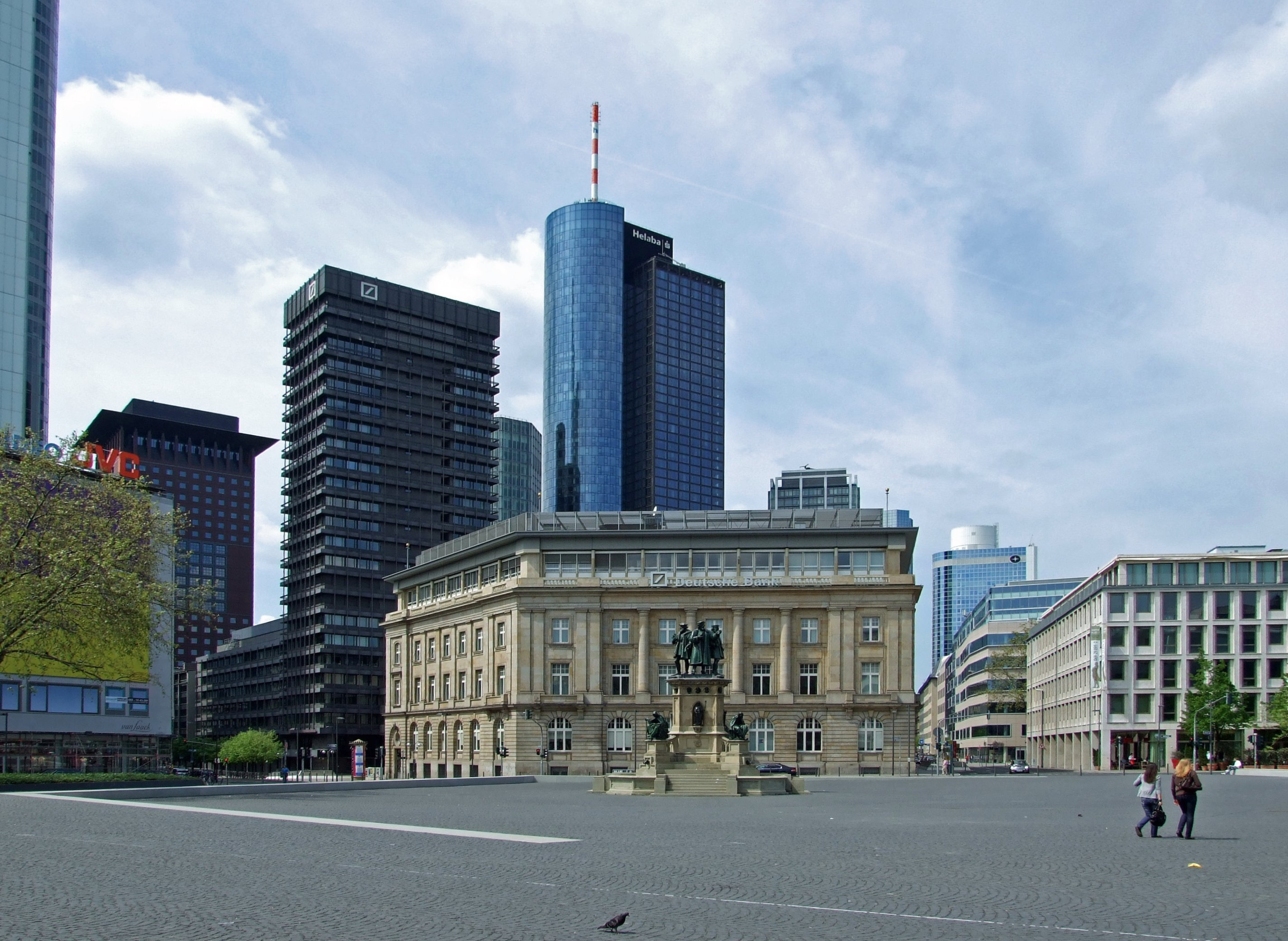
Rossmarkt with Gutenberg-Memorial

The pedestrian zone of the Zeil and its end points of Hauptwache and Konstablerwache are the central point for shopping in the city. Between the large department stores are shopping centres like the Zeilgalerie (now demolished and being replaced) and MyZeil. Other important streets begin at Hauptwache such as the Roßmarkt, Steinweg, Schillerstraße and Große Eschenheimer Straße. In the latter of these the Palais Thurn und Taxis used to stand, which has now been reconstructed, as well as important buildings from the post-war years like the Fernmeldehochhaus and the Rundschau-Haus. At its north end stands the Eschenheimer Turm, a relict of the city fortifications of the late Middle Ages. The Katharinenkirche, the main Protestant church of Frankfurt, stands at Hauptwache; on Bleichstraße the Peterskirche, with its preserved cemetery, is the only green space in the district. The area between Konstablerwache and Alte Gasse is the centre of the gay and lesbian community of Frankfurt.

=== Gerichtsviertel ===
The north eastern Innenstadt (courts quarter) is bordered by the eastern half of the Zeil, Konrad-Adenauer-Straße and the Friedberger Anlage. The law courts and its numerous buildings, including the higher regional court, the regional court, and an institute for remand can be found around this area in Heiligkreuzgasse. Several vocational colleges can be found in a noteworthy 1950s multi-story building on Seilerstraße.

The courts are supposed to be moved to new buildings on Adickesallee in Nordend in the forthcoming years, the character of the courts quarter would therefore completely change and new uses would be found for the area.

In Heiligkreuzgasse lies Frankfurts well known variety show, the Tigerpalast. The Odeon on the Anlagenring at Seilerstraße is a classic exhibition pavilion which was built for Simon Moritz von Bethmann. Nowadays this is used as a disco.

=== Allerheiligenviertel ===
The small quarter (All Saints quarter) between the Zeil and Battonnstraße forms a multicultural island in a city otherwise dedicated to commerce. The Breite Gasse forms a second red light district after that of the Bahnhofsviertel. The city library is located close to the Zeil and on Lange Straße there are several city council departments. With the reconstruction of the newly laid Kurt-Schumacher-Straße these council offices overlap the Frankfurter Judengasse, a Jewish Ghetto.

=== Fischerfeldviertel ===
The south eastern quarter of the Innenstadt was first built-up in the early 19th century, after the previous boggy area was drained out. The Börneplatz synagogue was located at Börneplatz up until the destruction of the synagogue during the Kristallnacht programme in 1938 and it was a centre of Jewish life in Frankfurt. The Jewish cemetery in Battonnstraße is one of the oldest in Europe. Besides this the central offices for public services and the local labour office can be found in the Fischerfeldviertel.

== History ==
=== The settlement of the Neustadt ===
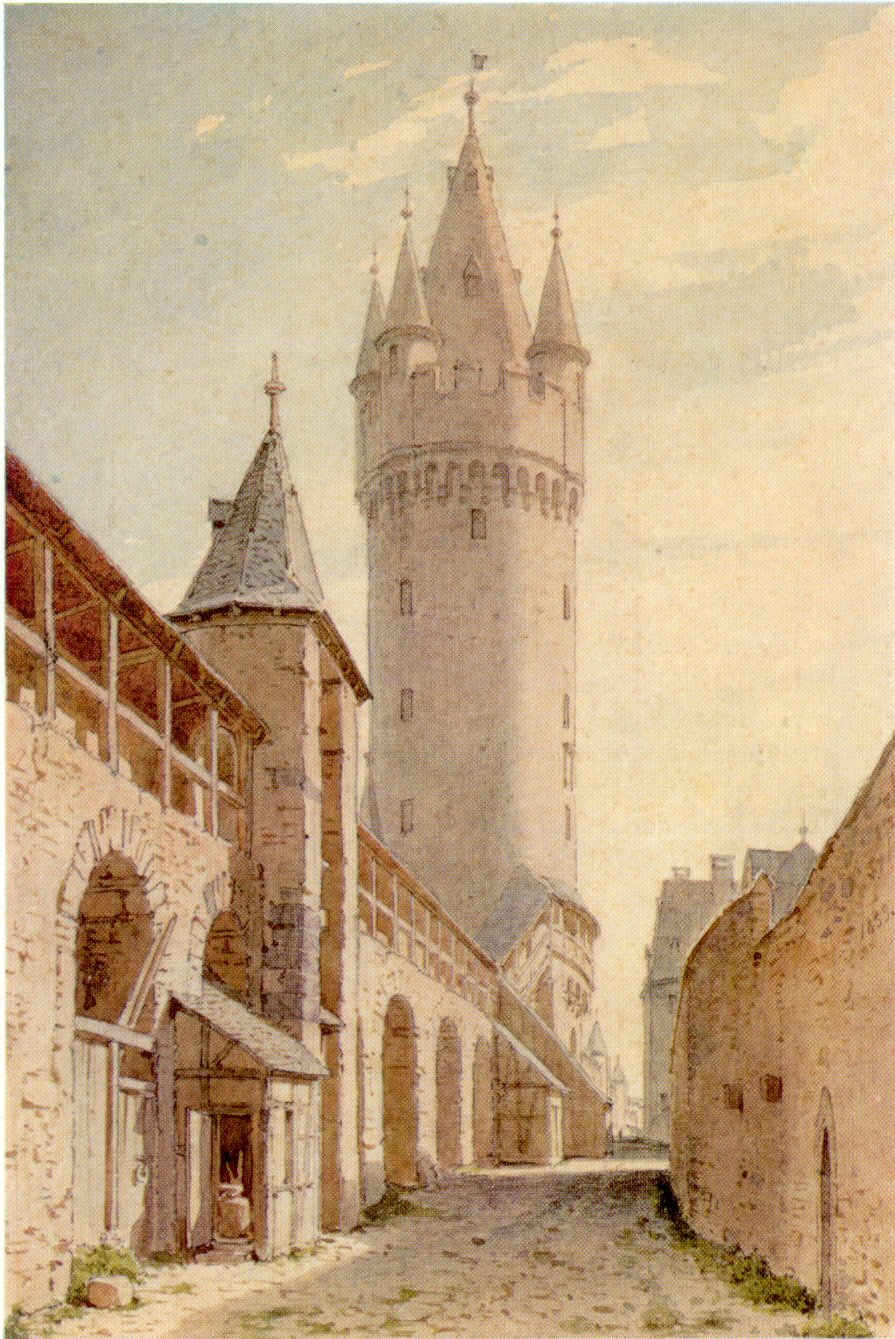
The Eschenheimer Turm

Today's Innenstadt was located outside the town walls until the 14th century. Other than the exposed parks the area was already built-up. Thus a row of houses developed from a cattle market to the north of the walled in town and this market lent its name to the new street: the Zeil. Highways ran to the east and west of that through the town gates into adjacent areas, such as the homes of Bockenheim and the Bockenheimer fort, in which there were already houses and gardens.

The establishment of the Neustadt began in the year 1333, when Emperor Ludwig der Bayer of the free realm approved of an expansion which would provide three times the previous area to the town. In the time soon after, the town erected new fortifications with five towers: The Gallustor (also Mainzer or Galgentor) on the site of the modern day Willy-Brandt-Platz, the Bockenheimer Tor on the site of the current Opernplatz, the Eschenheimer Tor, the Friedberger Tor and the Allerheiligentor. In the course of the following years the town's new area was filled with streets and buildings, whereby above all rich cloth dealers used the opportunity to establish representative domiciles for themselves outside the narrow old parts of the town. The Eschenheimer Turm, the most glorious tower of the new fortifications, was finished in 1428.

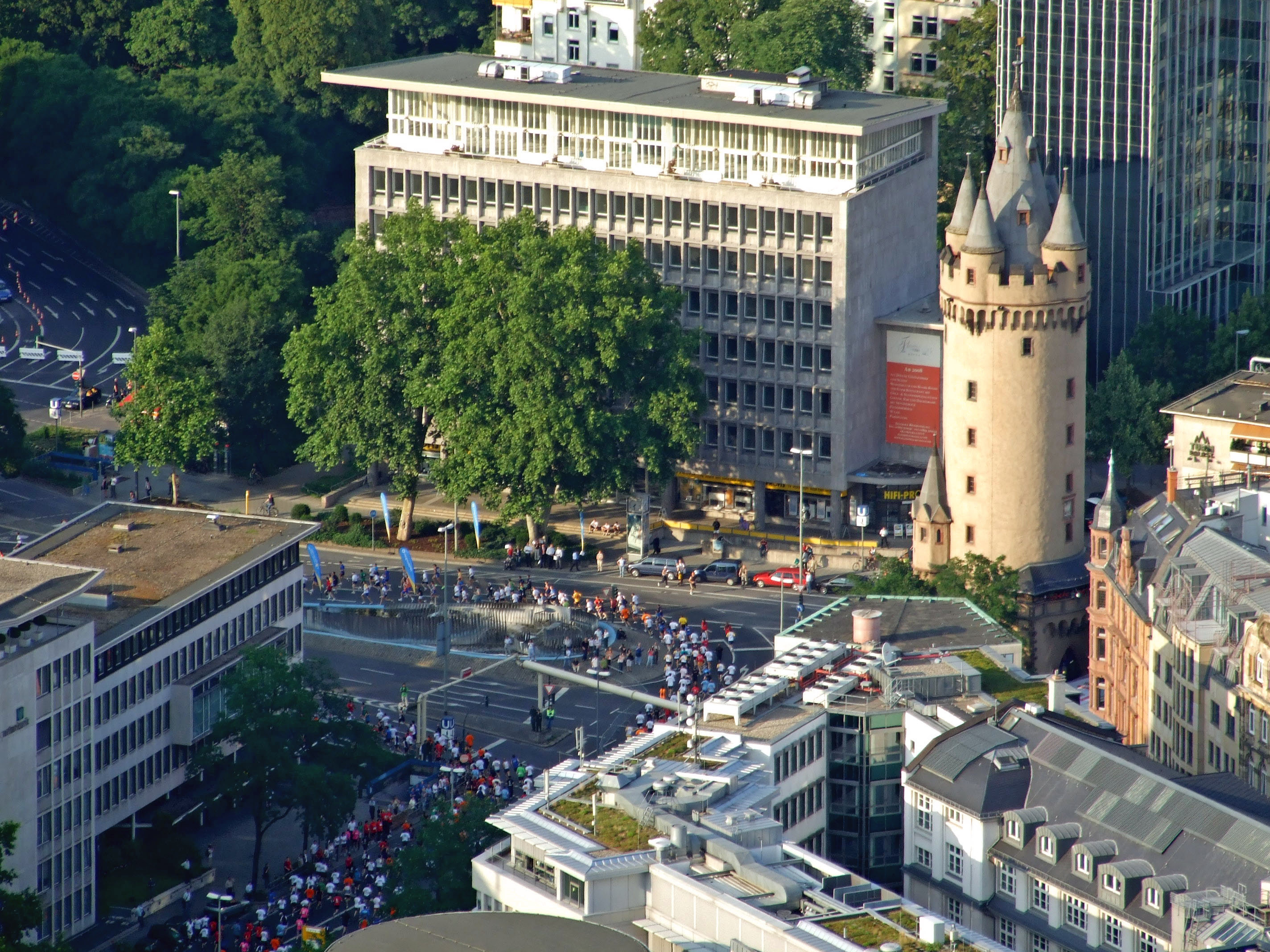
At present time

The first churches in Neustadt were two small chapels near Bockenheimer gate: the Heiligkreuz chapel of a poor hospital in 1346 as well as the neighbouring Kloster chapel of the Holy Katharina and Barbara in 1354. From the latter the larger seventeenth century Katharinenkirche developed. In the north of the Neustadt the Peterskirche was constructed in 1381, which has been the parochial church of the Neustadt since 1453. Aside from this a cemetery was laid out in this location in 1452, which became the only cemetery on the right side of the main after the closure of the cathedral in 1508. Until the opening of today's main cemetery in 1828 the Peterskirchhof (which was extended several times in the years between) remained the most important cemetery in the town. In 1453 another church was built in the Neustadt, the Maternkapelle at Roßmarkt.

In the 15th century there were still numerous areas of undeveloped land and many gardens in the Neustadt. The Altstadt was, at this time, still the preferred quarter of the city, and the Neustadt was settled mainly by immigrants flowing from the country into the increasing city. In the 16th century the old city ditch (which was the last deer ditch in 1584) between Altstadt and Neustadt was filled in.

=== Grand bourgeois buildings ===
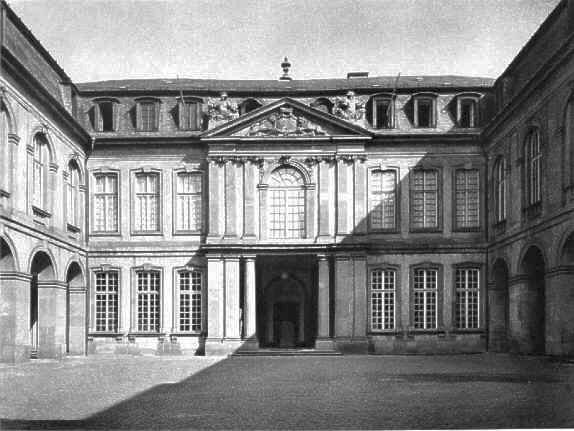
Palais Thurn und Taxis

In the following era gradually the weight of the city shifted between the old and the new town, the new town houses of rich citizens were now built in the Neustadt. These served as accommodation for the royal delegations of emperors who held their coronations in the city. The best known city palace was the Palais Thurn und Taxis of 1737 in Große Eschenheimer Straße. A few years prior to this in 1730 the still preserved police headquarters were built in the heart of the Neustadt. On the Zeil, in particular, a number of representative community centres and the palace of Barckhausen developed in the 18th century. The palace was used for three years as an imperial residence due to Wittelsbacher Karl VII's war with Austria preventing him from moving back into his Munich residence.

In the active developmental period of the classic era, the best known house of the time is the Goethe House in the Großer Hirschgraben of the Neustadt. In 1755 an urban horse stable was set up at Roßmarkt. In 1782 the Komödienhaus (comedy house), the first definite sign of the future of theatres in Frankfurt, was built on today's Rathenauplatz. Land development of the Fischerfeld in the southeast of the new city began in 1792 from the plans of the architect general, Johann George Christian Hess. The most important of the buildings developed there was municipal library on the bank of the Main, sketched by Hess, which opened in 1825.

In 1804, during continuing occupation by French troops in the Coalition Wars, the city council decided upon the removal and replacement of the city walls. In the course of the following years a barrier of plants was put in place which is still there as the Anlagen (parks) of today. The plants were placed under the protection of a decree in 1807 which prevented further land development on the now natural barrier.

The Neustadt became the scene of revolutionary events in 1833: particularly the watch towers at Hauptwache and Konstablerwache. The national assembly in Frankfurt met in 1848/9 in the Paulskirche, the largest and most modern hall of the city located in the Altstadt. However, the different political and parliamentary groups met in accommodation and cafés throughout the Neustadt.

A monument to Goethe was erected at Roßmarkt in 1844, which was moved to the Gallusanlage where it has stood since 1952. 1858 saw the erection of a monument for Johannes Gutenberg which was also placed in Roßmarkt, and another for Friedrich Schiller in 1864 which initially stood at Hauptwache but was moved to Goetheplatz in 1878 and then to the Taunusanlage in 1955. It was late in the city's history before it decided on the construction of a monument to Bismarck, which was set up in the Gallusanlage but later melted down in 1940. The citizens of Frankfurt established a venue in Junghofstraße as a festival and concert hall in 1859. The new main synagogue was inaugurated in Börnerstraße in 1860, and in 1882 another synagogue followed at Börneplatz.

=== The Neustadt as a large modern city ===
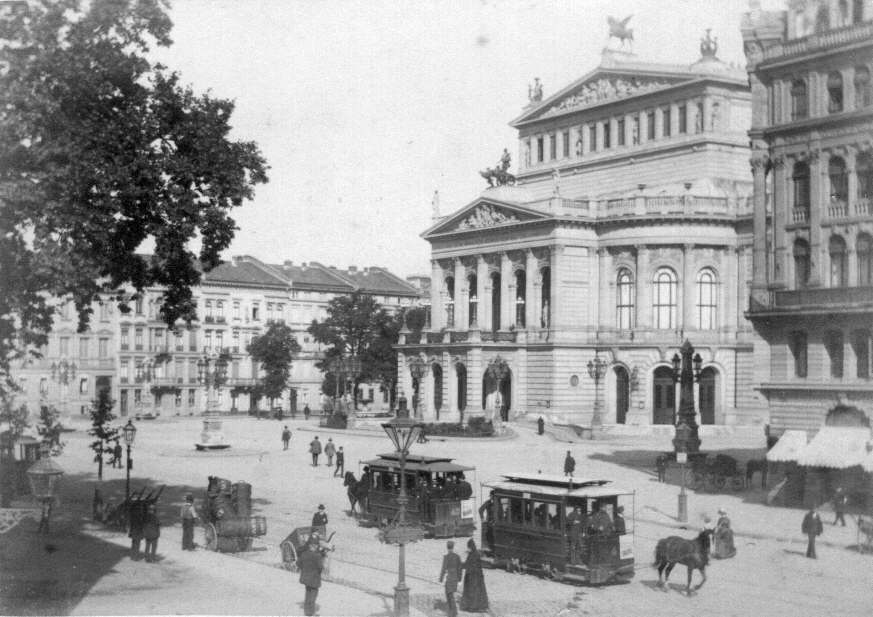
The opera house

After the Austro-Prussian War, Frankfurt quickly developed into one of the more modern cities of Germany. Until that point the wide, meshed road system of the Neustadt had been consolidated by tearing down houses and other areas to allow for splendorous boulevards. After 1870, Kaiserstraße and Kaiserplatz became the main connection between Hauptwache and the western train stations. In 1876, the hotel Frankfurt Hof opened on Kaiserplatz, from which point on it was known as the "First House on the Square". After further demolition the new Zeil, Schillerstrasse and Goethestrasse were laid. The extension of the Neue Mainzer Straße was finished in 1874 with a bridge named Untermainbrücke. The newly built home of the stock exchange was opened in 1879 close to Hauptwache. The opera house was established and inaugurated in 1880 following the donations of Frankfurt's citizens. The new law courts were opened in Heiligkreuzstrasse in 1889 and followed by the theatre in Untermainanlage in 1902.

The rapid process of growth in the new city led to the formation of a town centre. The previous residential districts developed into a commercial and business centre and the residents were soon ejected from the area.

The trams were changed to electrical operation from 1899, whereby the city had a modern and efficient traffic service. The central traffic node of the trams was situated at Hauptwache, numerous lines lead through the Zeil, which developed into a road of large department stores.

In the years after the first world war the emphasis of the development concerning town construction shifted more towards the outside quarters. The medieval parts of the city centre fell victim, as those in the Gothic Altstadt did, to the numerous allied air raids of 1943-44.

Above all the reconstruction considered the needs of urban traffic and accepted modern town planning. Thus, completely new traffic axles were laid, for instance, Konrad-Adenauer-Strasse and the Zeil were considerably widened during their reconstruction. The redevelopment of the city centre brought the Innenstadt into the 1960s. The building of the underground system changed and from 1963, after intense construction measures, a large underground rapid-transit station was built underneath Hauptwache and Konstablerwache. The Zeil and the Freßgas were turned into pedestrian zones and until 1986 most tram lines were shut down. In the western part of the Innenstadt a banking quarter formed around the model of the American Central Business Districts. Since the 1970s this western part has seen numerous new skyscrapers, the best known of which include the Eurotower at Willy-Brandt-Platz and the Commerzbank Tower at Kaiserplatz.

== Economy ==
All Nippon Airways and Japan Airlines have their Frankfurt offices in Innenstadt.
