= Kirchgasse =

Coordinates: 50°4′47″N 8°14′17″E

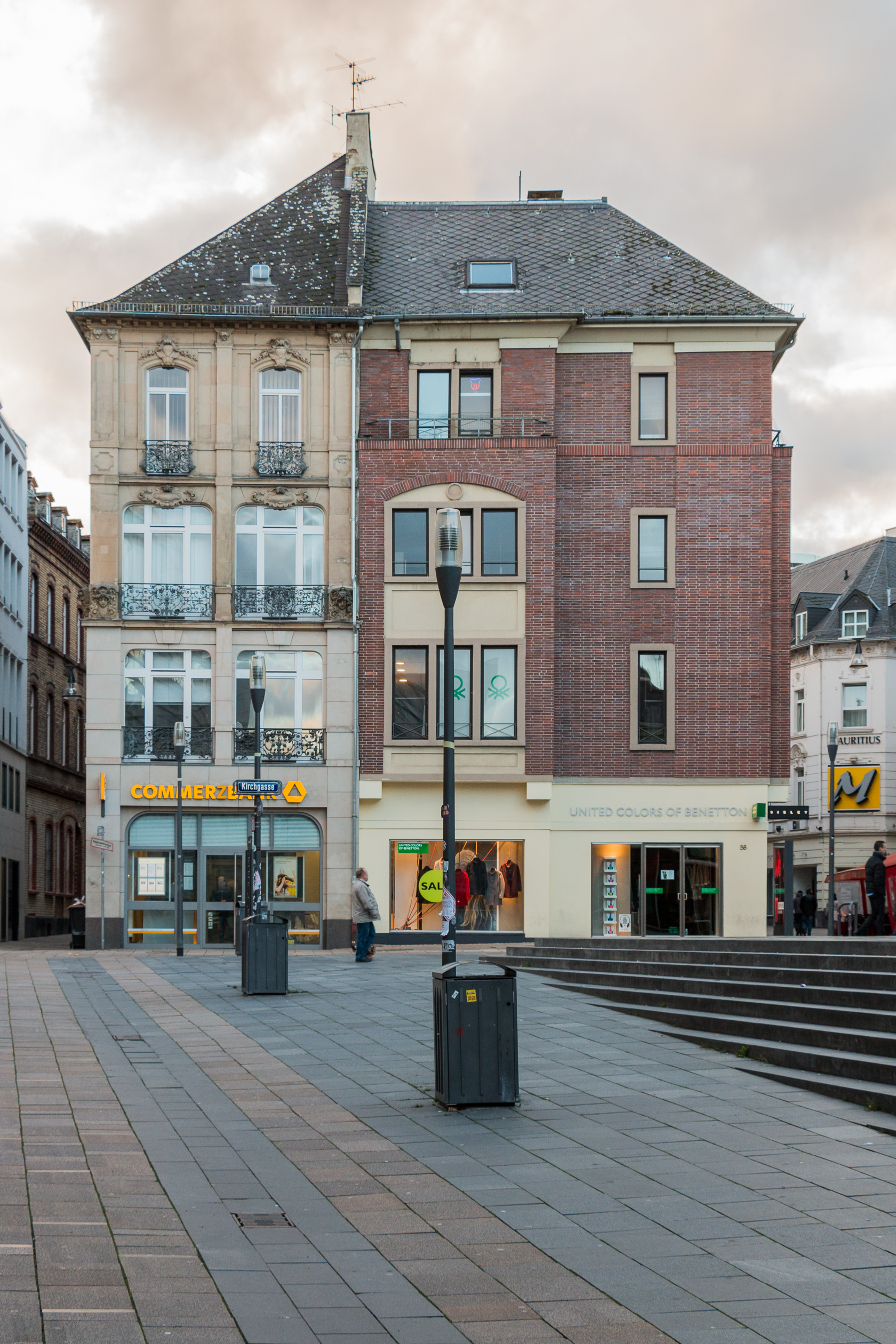
The Kirchgasse at the Mauritiusplatz

The Kirchgasse is a shopping street in central Wiesbaden, Germany, and with roughly 11,000 people passing through every hour, it is one of the busiest shopping streets in Germany. The Kirchgasse is a designated pedestrian zone and spans about 500 meters from the Rheinstraße on the southern end to the Langgasse on the northern end. In 2007 a study has named the Kirchgasse the second most expensive street for retail property in Hesse, after the Zeil in Frankfurt am Main.

== See also ==
- List of leading shopping streets and districts by city
