= Zeilgalerie =

Coordinates: 50°06′51″N 8°40′52″E

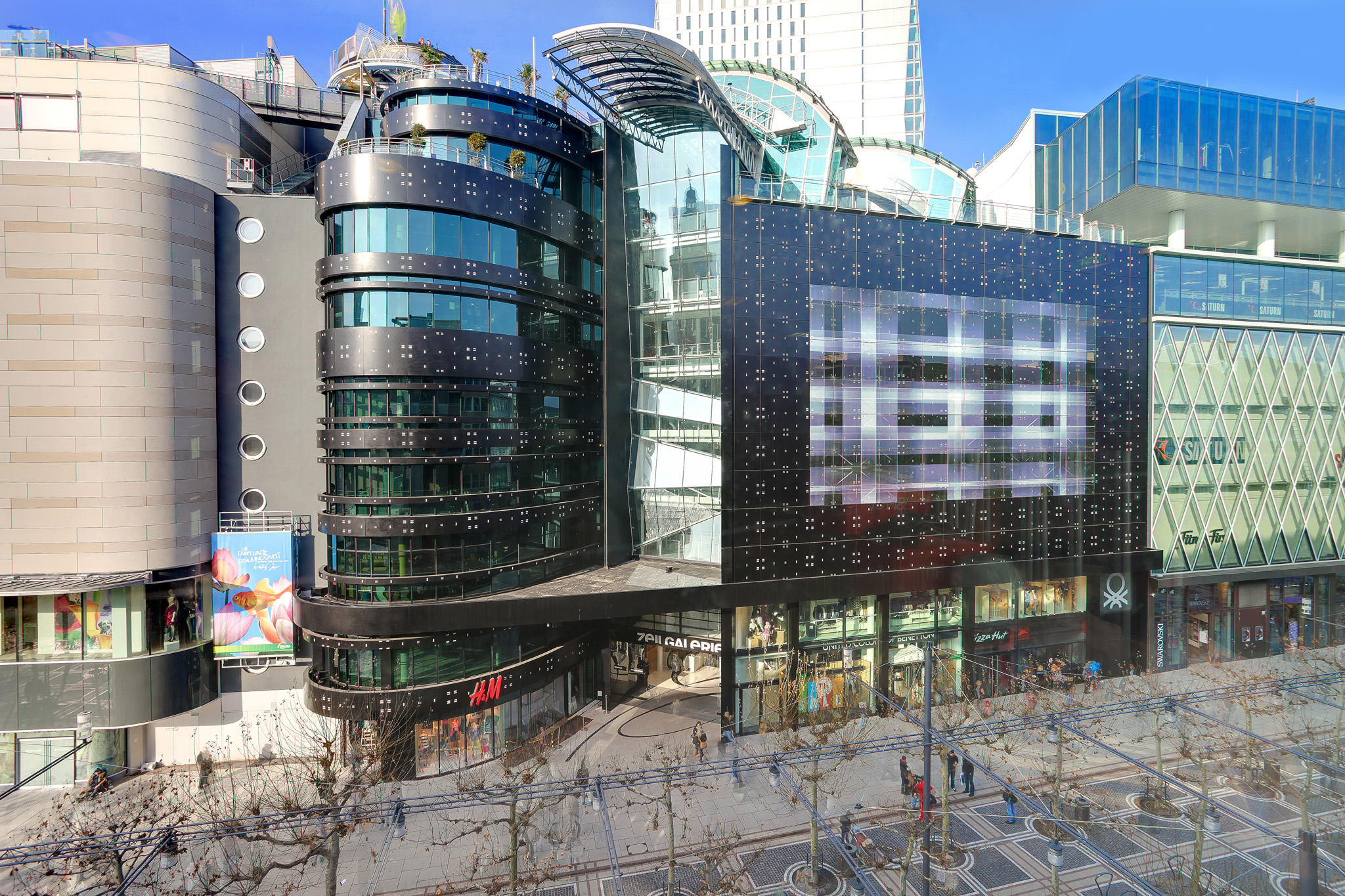
The Zeilgalerie

Zeilgalerie was a shopping centre located at the Zeil in Frankfurt am Main, Germany. It was opened in September 1992 and was 41 metres tall with 10 floors, one of which was underground. There were approximately 70 stores in the building.

== History ==
When it first opened in 1992, the Zeilgalerie had only one escalator, which went in an upwards direction. A few years later, a downwards traveling escalator was installed.

An IMAX theatre was added on to the roof of the Zeilgalerie in the late 1990s. However, the cinema soon turned bankrupt and the space was converted into a cinema for premieres of films. This succumbed to the same fate and the area remained empty until becoming known as the Astor Film Lounge.

The building was owned by Rodamco Europe, a real estate company from The Netherlands. In January 2007, the owners agreed to divest the shopping centre.

The building was demolished in 2016. It has been replaced by a mall called "UpperZeil", which was completed in 2018.

== See also ==
- MyZeil
