= Eschenheimer Turm =

Landmark of Frankfurt

Coordinates: 50.1169°N 8.67972°E

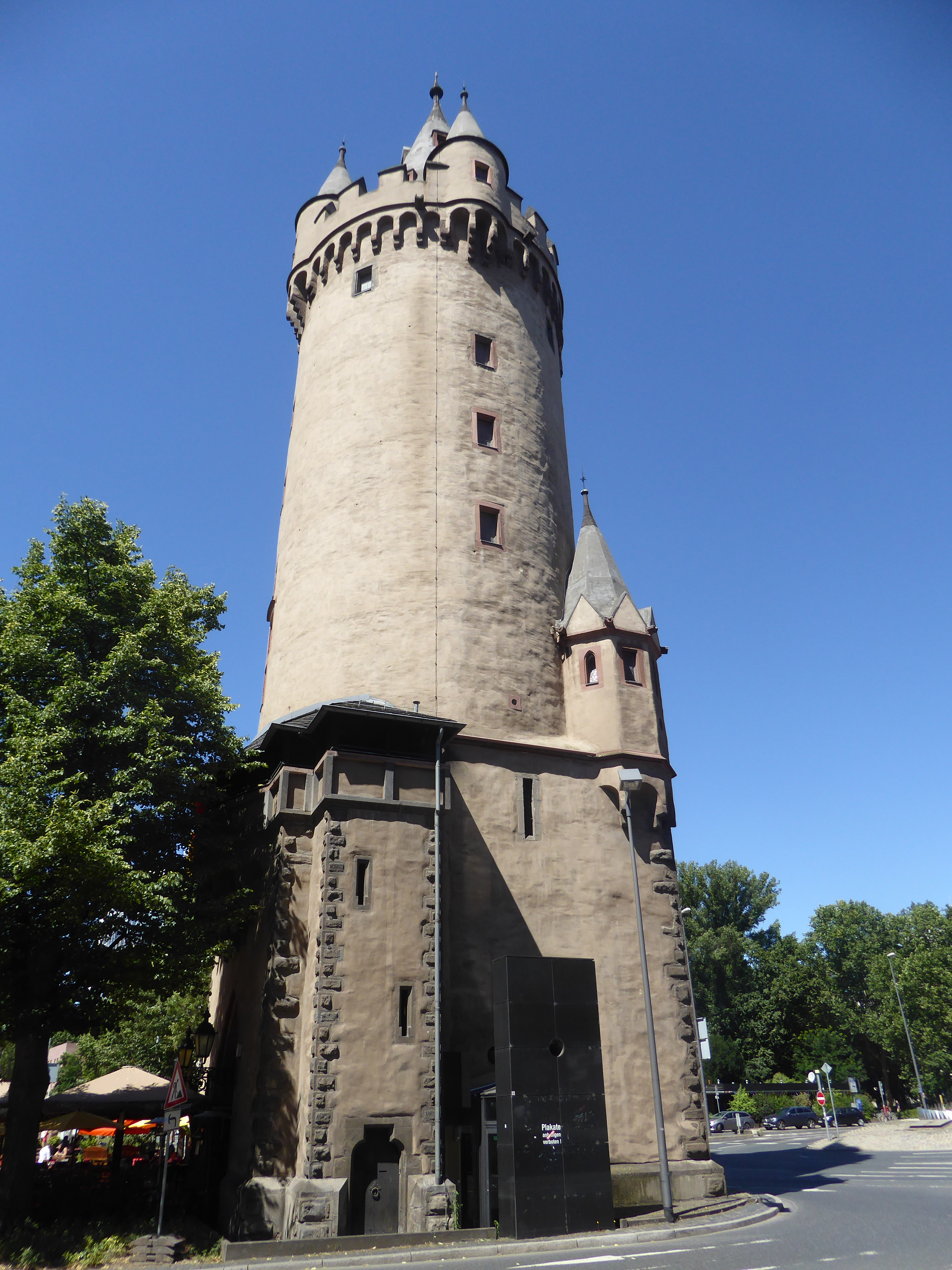
Eschenheimer Turm

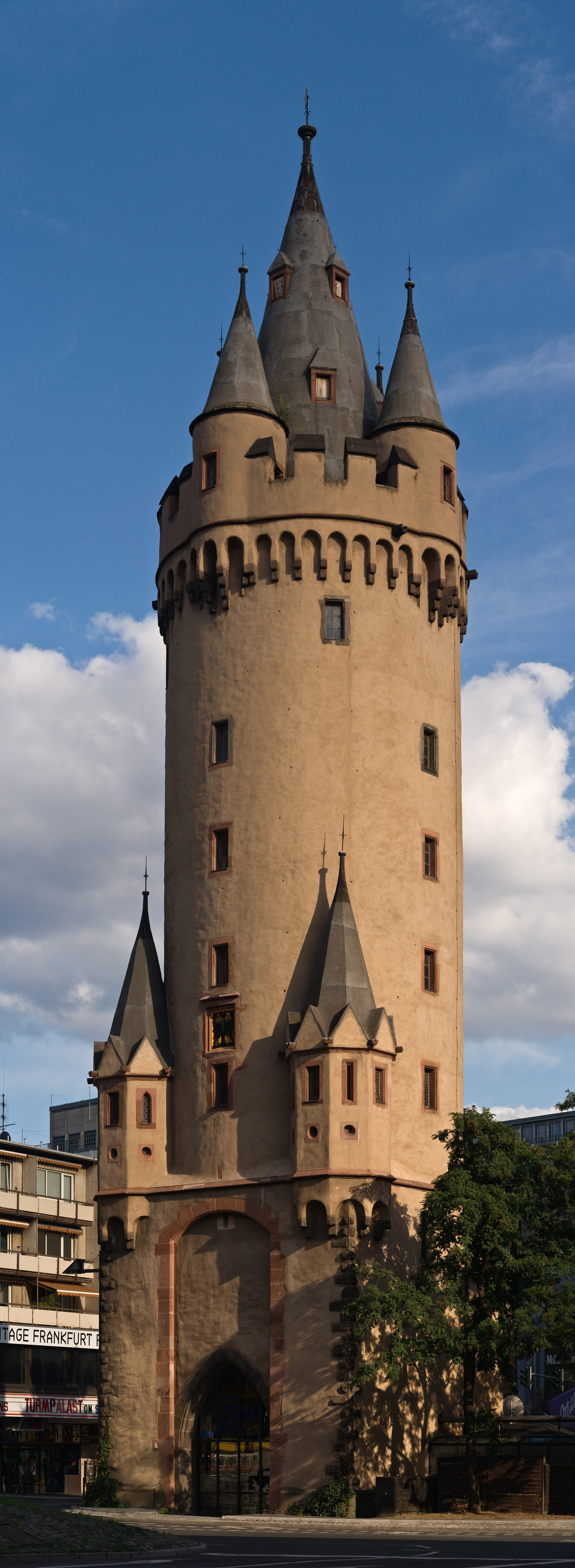
Eschenheimer Turm from the northwest

Eschenheimer Turm (Eschenheim Tower) was a city gate, part of the late-medieval fortifications of Frankfurt am Main, and is a landmark of the city. The tower, which was erected at the beginning of the fifteenth century, is at once the oldest and most unaltered building in the largely reconstructed Frankfurter Neustadt (new town), now better known as the Innenstadt (city center).

== History and location ==
=== Location and previous tower ===
In the early 14th century the Frankfurter Altstadt (old town) gradually began to expand beyond its borders; documentation from the 1320s of buildings erected outside of the city wall testifies to the growing need for expansion. With the permission of Holy Roman Emperor Louis IV, the free imperial city began its so-called "second city expansion," increasing the surface area of the city threefold.

In 1343, only ten years after the establishment of the Neustadt, the construction of the city wall began, also approved by the emperor, in order to protect the Neustadt from the diverse dangers that threatened the city at that time. Apart from a central boulevard Zeil, the site of the cattle market and the Roßmarkt, the new town was primarily devoted to gardens and agriculture, rather than residential or commercial buildings.

Although the new fortifications took over 100 years to build, on 11 October 1349, merely three years after the beginning of construction, the cornerstone was laid for a gate tower at the site of the later Eschenheimer Turm, which at the time was simply described as "round." Located at the end of Große Eschenheimer Straße (an extension of the Kornmarkt, the city's second most important north–south axis), the fortification was of great strategic importance.

=== Current tower ===
In 1400 the carpenter Klaus Mengoz began construction of a replacement for the first gate tower. The architect of the Frankfurt Cathedral, Madern Gerthener, completed the new Eschenheimer Turm in 1426–1428. In 1806–1812 the old city walls were replaced with new fortifications at the command of the Prussian government, and Eschenheimer Turm, along with all the other historic gates and towers, was slated for demolition. At the objection of the ambassador of the French occupying forces, Count d'Hédouville, Eschenheimer Turm was allowed to remain as a monument. Besides Eschenheimer Turm (the most famous of the ca. 60 towers that comprised the city's fortifications), only two other towers—the Rententurm on the Römerberg (Frankfurt's main city square) and Kuhhirtenturm in Alt-Sachsenhausen—were spared demolition.

== Architecture ==
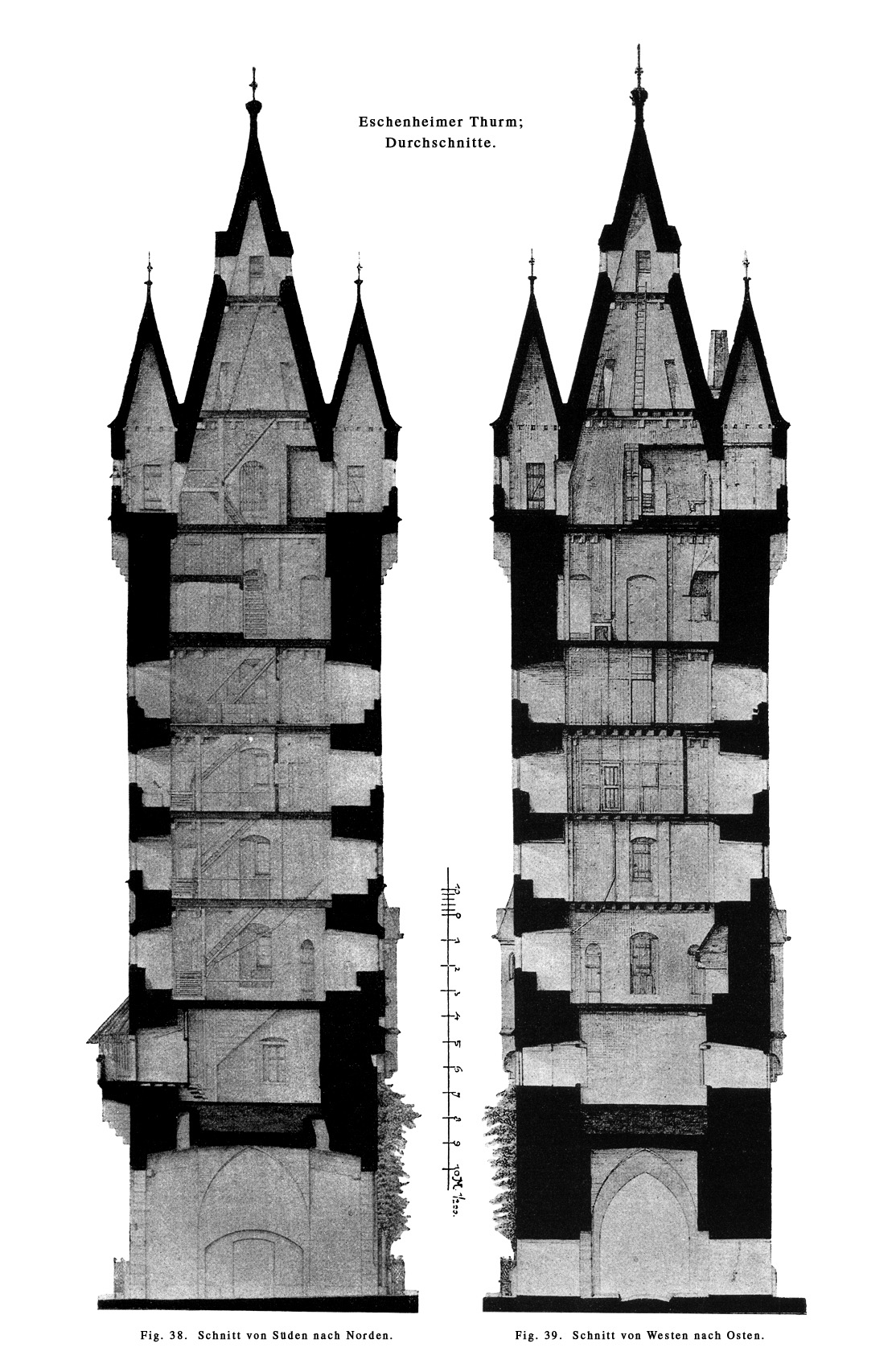
Cross section, 1885

Eschenheimer Turm is 47 metres high, consisting of eight levels and two attics (see diagram, left). Atop a square base that houses the gate sits a round tower, which culminates in a steep spire appointed with four, small, equally proportioned side turrets and a projecting battlement. Adolfsturm, a similar tower built in the imperial city of Friedberg in 1347, may have served as a model.

Originally, Große Eschenheimer Straße led through the gothic arches of the gate, turning into Eschenheimer Landstraße once outside the city fortifications (the street now goes around the tower). The passage could be closed with a portcullis; rubble and stones were stored on the first level (directly above the gate), with which the passageway could be further barricaded in the event of an attack. On the second level, behind 2.5 m (8 ft.) thick walls, were situated the living quarters of the tower guard, which remained inhabited until 1956. Both sides of the tower display coats of arms in relief: facing the city is a silver eagle on a red field, the coat of arms the free imperial city of Frankfurt, and on the opposite side is a black double-headed eagle on a golden field, the coat of arms of the Holy Roman Empire. On the inward-facing side of the tower is a covered balcony, whereas the outward-facing side is flanked by two small towers. The portrait in relief over the entrance to the restaurant on the city side of the tower is most likely that of the builder, Gerthener.

On top of the tower is an iron weather vane. According to legend, Hans Winkelsee, a poacher who was condemned to death and was being held in custody in the Tower, was able to shoot the figure 9 into the weather vane with nine pistol shots. The city council is said to have been so impressed by the spectacle that it pardoned Winkelsee. The holes in the weather vane are clearly visible today, but it is no longer the same vane.

== Description ==
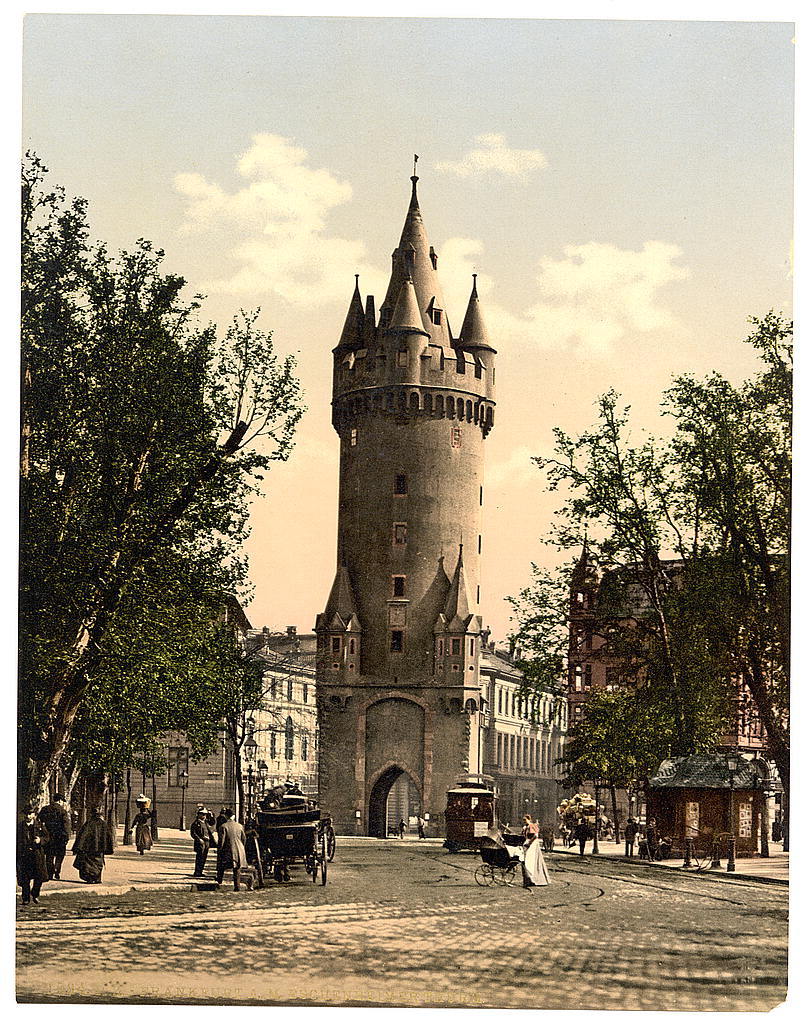
Eschenheimer Turm c. 1900

The tower is now set in a large, very busy plaza, called Eschenheimer Tor (Eschenheimer Gate).

Underneath Eschenheimer Tor is a subway station, which was erected in 1963–1968. The subway tunnel passes directly under the foundations of the tower. The midlevel of metro station used to be the only way for pedestrians to cross the plaza or reach the tower. However, in 1992, Eschenheimer tower, which for decades was situated on an inaccessible traffic island, was incorporated into the Schillerstraße pedestrian zone, making it once again accessible to foot traffic. The ground floor has since been repurposed as a bar and restaurant. Furthermore, the fireplace room of the tower guard is used by the hospitality operations. Quarterly meetings of the association Freunde Frankfurts (the Friends of Frankfurt) continue to be held in the fireplace room, as is reported in the history of the tower. Visits to the tower battlements are also possible. The last renovation of the tower was initiated by Ruth Schwarz a member of the Freunde Frankfurts. Large sections of the original staircase and shelves from 1426 to 1428 have been preserved.

In 1853–1856, following the example of Eschenheimer Turm, Flatowturm was constructed in Schlosspark Babelsberg in the city of Potsdam.

The tower is part of the corporate logo of the former Henninger Bräu AG. Today it serves as the logo for Henninger Kaiser Pils in the Radeberger Gruppe KG.

== Gallery ==
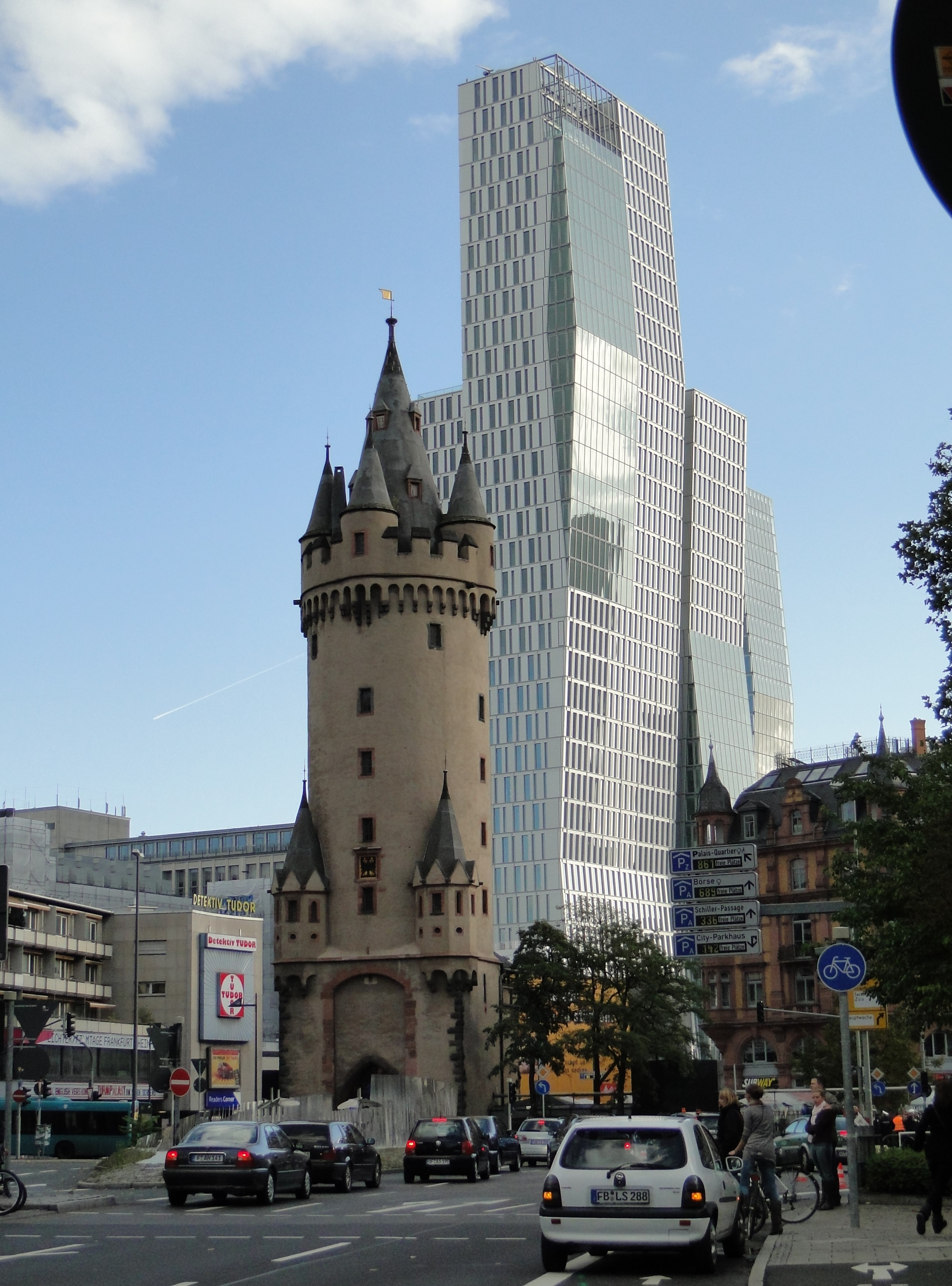
2009, in front of the Hochhauskulisse

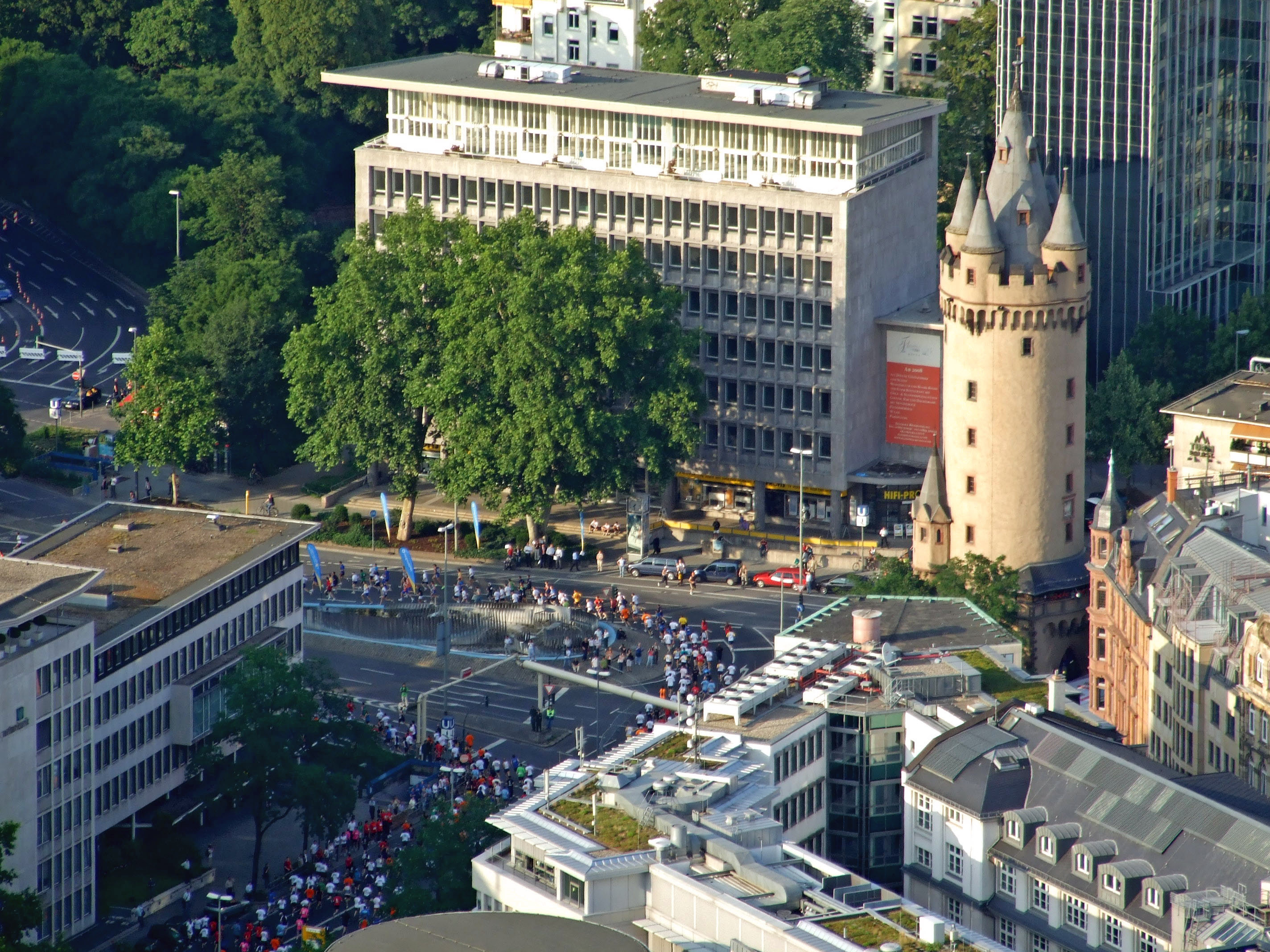
Eschenheimer Tor with Eschenheimer Turm, right

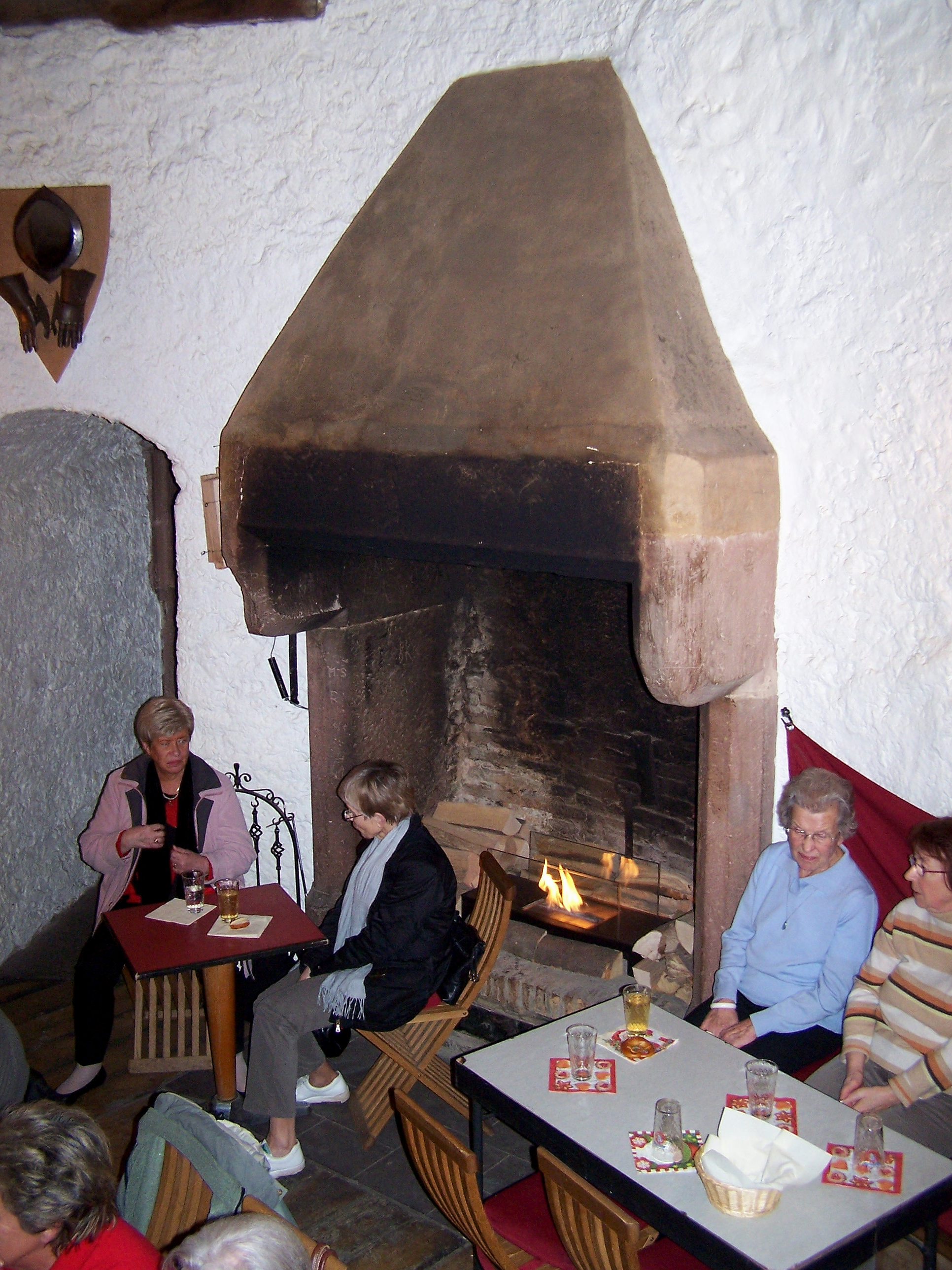
Interior

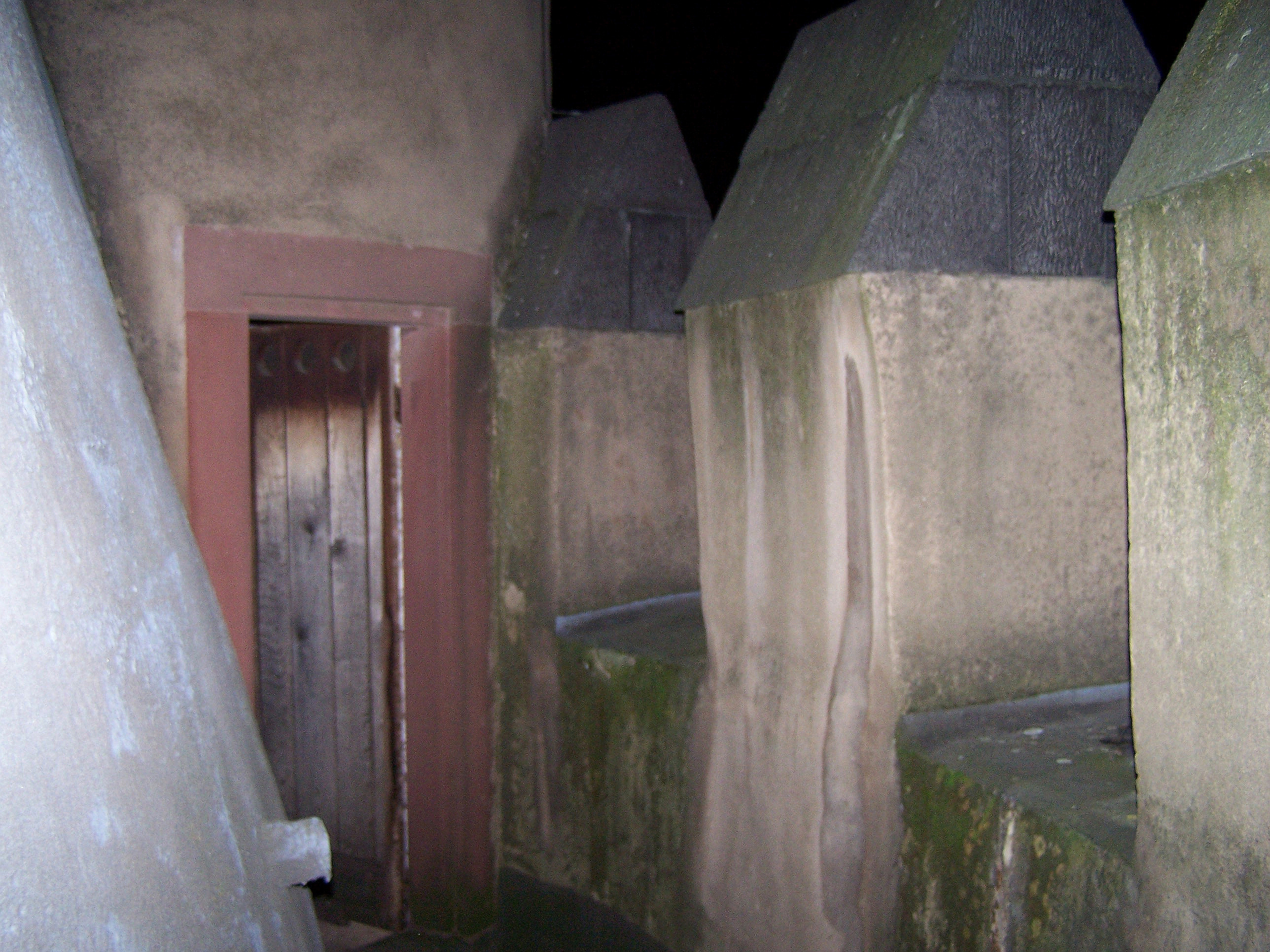
Atop the battlements

== Sources ==
In German:

- August von Cohausen: Beiträge zur Geschichte Frankfurts im Mittelalter, in: Archiv für Frankfurts Geschichte und Kunst, Bd. 12, Selbstverlag des Vereins in Kommission bei Heinrich Keller, Frankfurt am Main 1869, p. 21–56.
- Rudolf Jung, Carl Wolff: Die Baudenkmäler von Frankfurt am Main – Band 2, Weltliche Bauten. Selbstverlag/Völcker, Frankfurt am Main 1898, p. 26–41.
- Bettina Maierhofer: Der kleinste Turm mit der längsten Geschichte. Traditionsbewußt mit einem Augenzwinkern. Der Eschenheimer Turm darf als ältestes Hochhaus der Stadt gelten und ist erstmals beim Wolkenkratzer-Festival dabei. In: Frankfurter Allgemeine Sonntagszeitung (Sonderbeilage Wolkenkratzerfestival). 6. Mai 2007, p. B10.
- Carl Theodor Reiffenstein: Die Wahrzeichen von Frankfurt a. M., in: Archiv für Frankfurts Geschichte und Kunst, Bd. 9, Selbstverlag des Vereins in Kommission bei Heinrich Keller, Frankfurt am Main 1860, p. 288–291.
- Ruth Schwarz: Der Eschenheimer Turm. Ein Wahrzeichen Frankfurts. Verlag Waldemar Kramer, Frankfurt am Main 2001, ISBN 978-3-7829-0517-6.
- Wolf-Christian Setzepfandt (August 2002), Architekturführer Frankfurt am Main (in German) (3 ed.), Berlin: Dietrich Reimer Verlag, p. 8, ISBN 3-496-01236-6
