= Palais Thurn und Taxis =

Reconstructed historic building in Frankfurt am Main

Coordinates: 50.115°N 8.67972°E

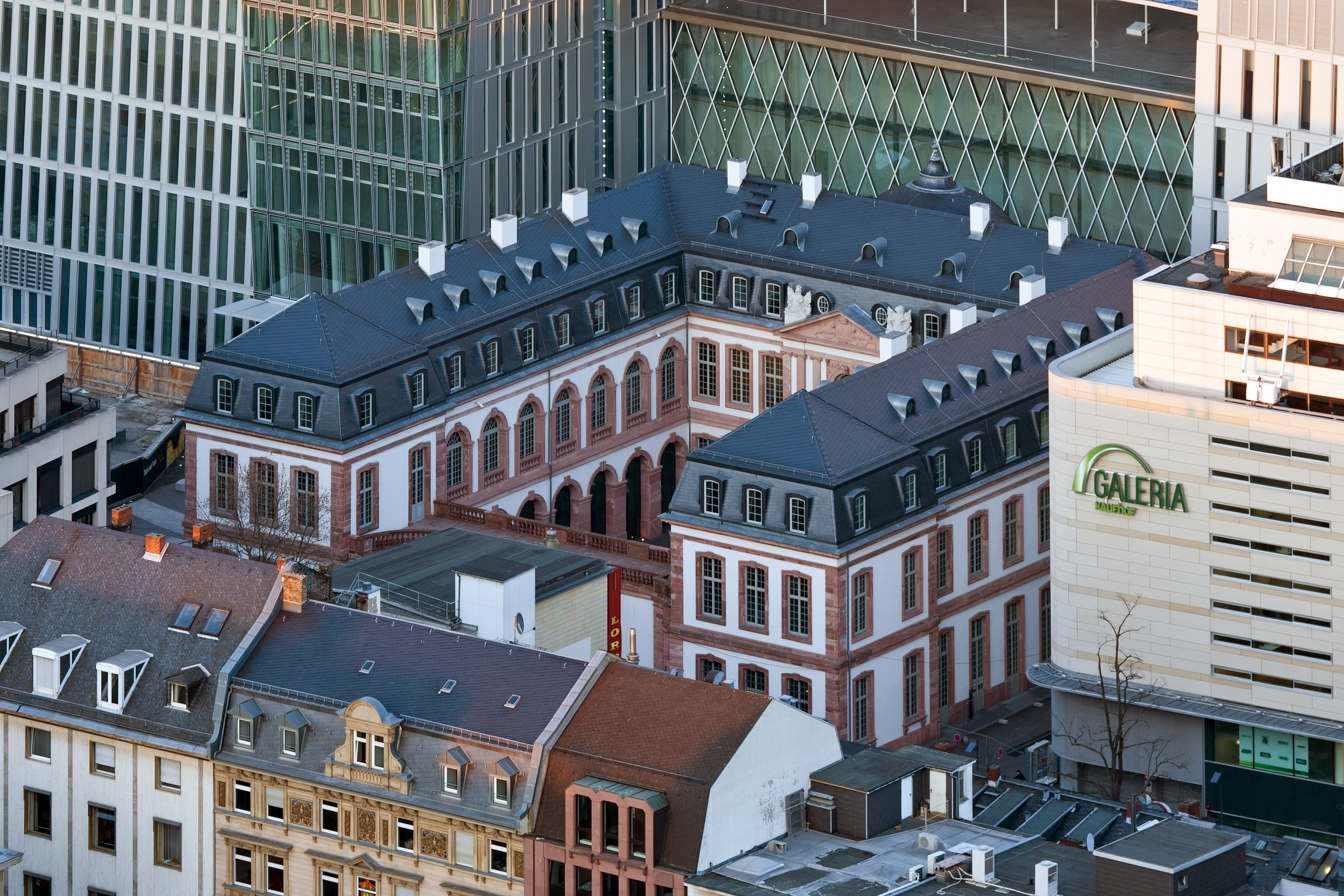
The newly constructed Palais Thurn und Taxis in 2009

The Palais Thurn und Taxis (German: [paˈleː ˈtuːɐ̯n ʔʊnt ˈtaksɪs]) in Frankfurt, Germany was built from 1731 to 1739 by Robert de Cotte and commissioned by the Imperial Postmaster, Prince Anselm Franz von Thurn und Taxis (1714–1739).

The building was heavily damaged in World War II and then demolished. Today a reconstruction houses some shops.

== History ==
In 1748 the castle was the administrative seat of the imperial post office, then operated by the Thurn und Taxis family, and from 1805 to 1813 it was the residence of the Prince Primate and Grand Duke of Frankfurt, Karl Theodor von Dalberg. After the restoration of the Free City of Frankfurt, it held the Bundestag of the German Confederation from 1816 to 1848 and from 1851 to 1866. The public was excluded from the meetings. They were chaired by the Austrian envoy, who would live in the castle when the Bundestag was in session.

In 1895 Prince Albert I von Thurn und Taxis sold the Palais to the Imperial Post. In 1905 the city of Frankfurt took over the palace and used it to house the Museum of Ethnology for the collections of the African explorer Leo Frobenius.

=== Demolition & reconstruction ===
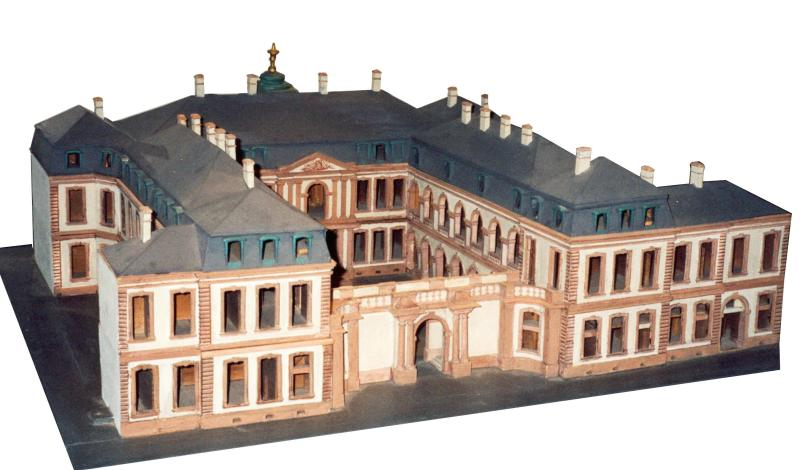
Model of the original Palais Thurn und Taxis

During 1943 and 1944 the palace was badly damaged in the bombing of Frankfurt am Main in World War II, but much of the structure was preserved, such as some ceiling paintings and stucco. Although reconstruction was possible, it would have been too costly, and so much of the building was demolished in 1951. The remaining parts of the building were actually new buildings made from sections of the original, but with modern reinforced concrete and without the mansard roofs.

From 2004 to 2010 the palais has been reconstructed as part of the Palais Quartier development.

== See also ==
- Palais Quartier
- Free City of Frankfurt
