= MyZeil =

Shopping mall in central Frankfurt, Germany

Coordinates: 50°06′51″N 8°40′54″E

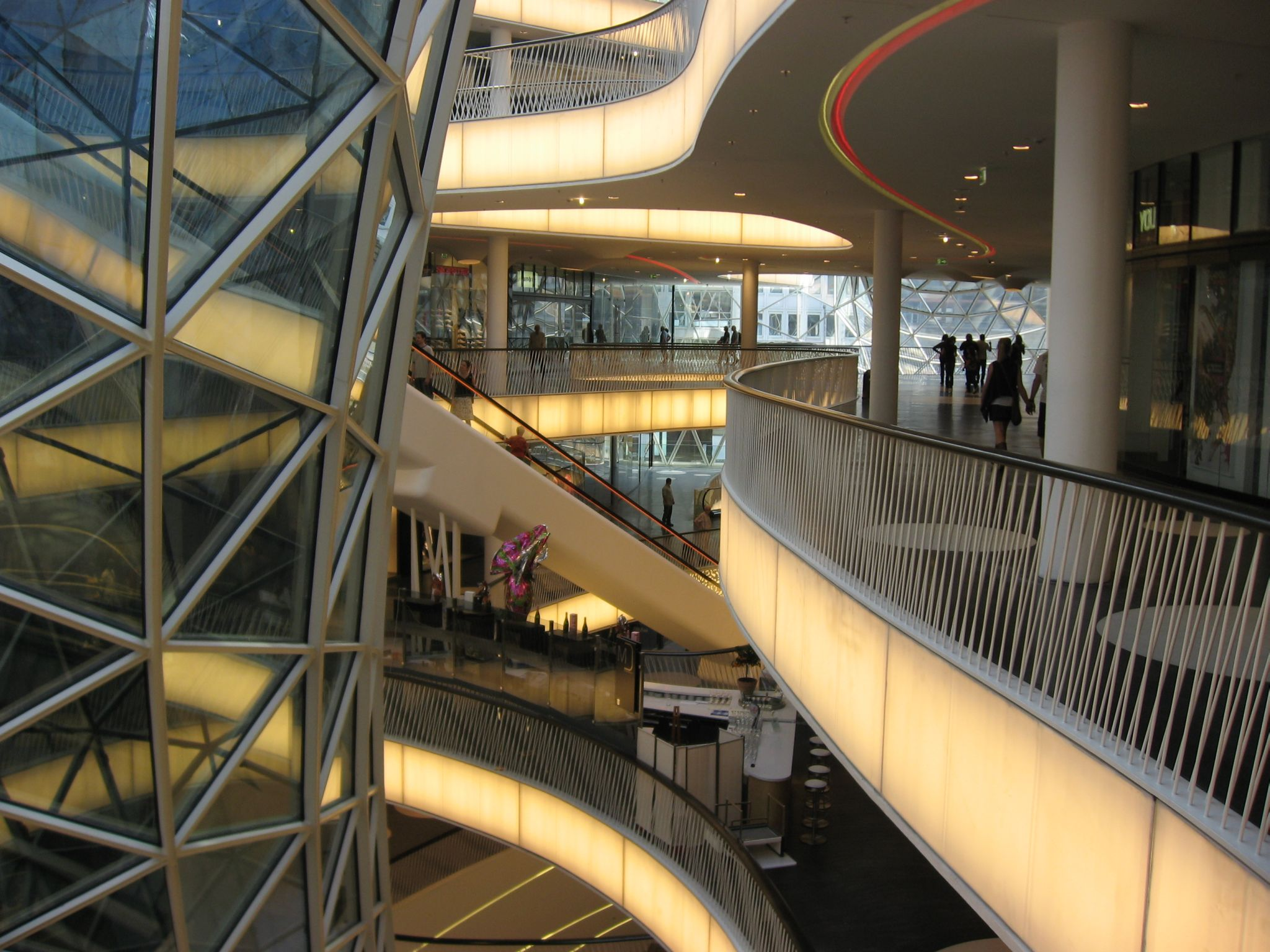
Interior of MyZeil, April 2009

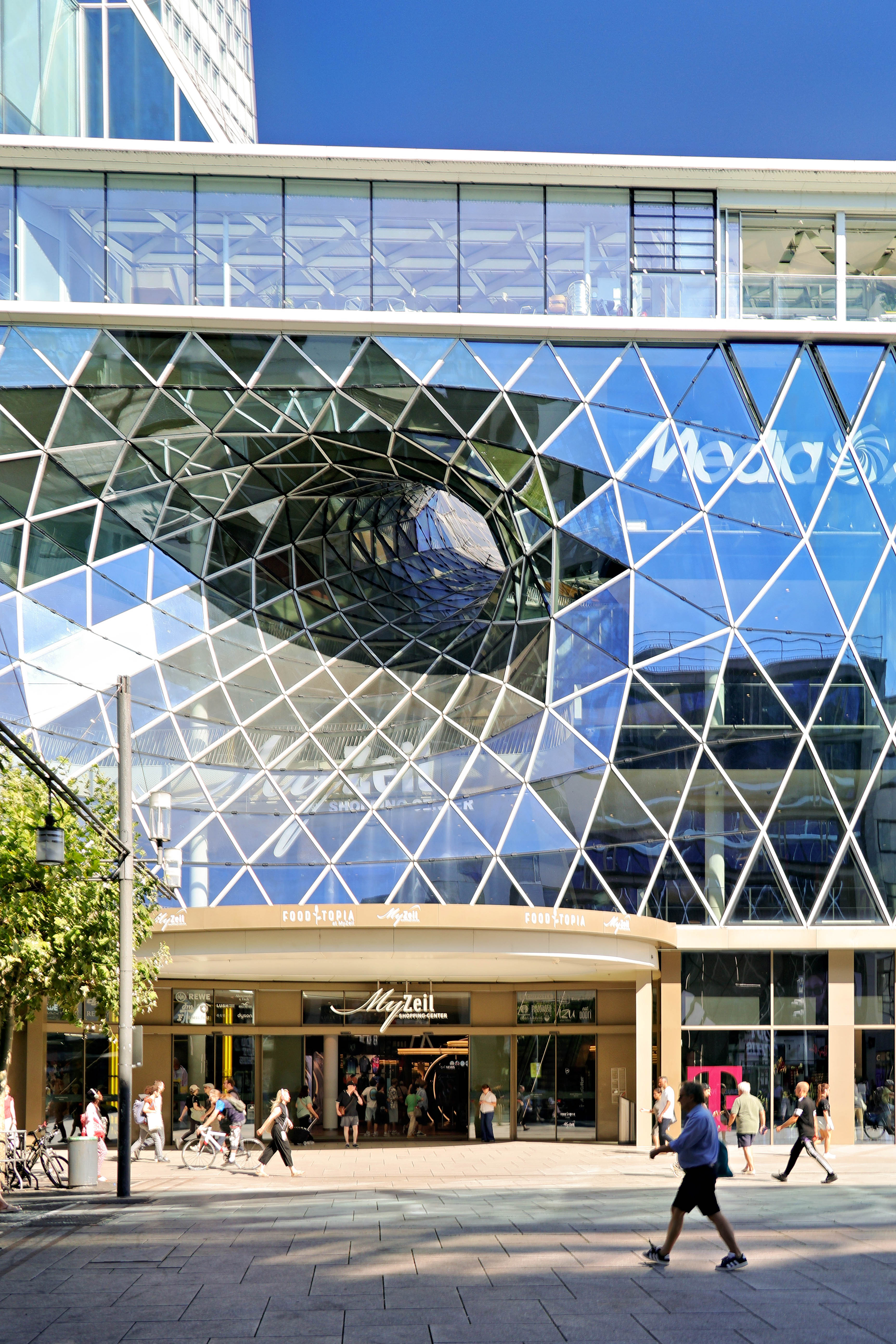
View of the Zeil (2026)

MyZeil is a shopping mall in the center of Frankfurt, Germany. It was designed by Italian architect Massimiliano Fuksas. It is part of the PalaisQuartier development, with its main entrance on the Zeil, Frankfurt's main shopping street. It was officially opened on 26 February 2009 by the city mayor Petra Roth.
