= Zeil =

Shopping street in Frankfurt, Germany

Coordinates: 50°06′52″N 8°41′01″E

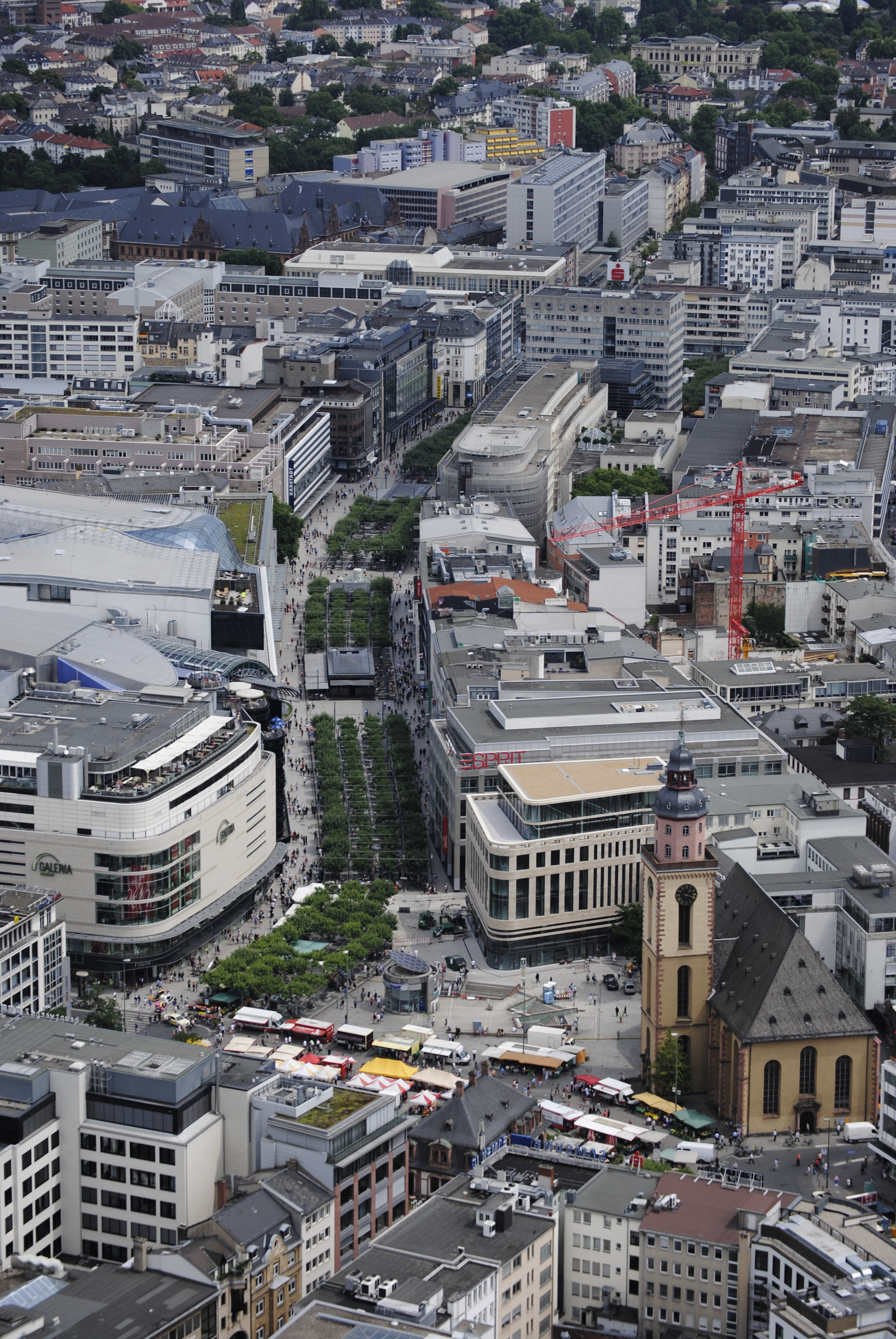
- Zeil seen from the Main Tower
- Type: Pedestrian (partly)
- Length: 1.2 km (0.75 mi)
- Location: Innenstadt, Frankfurt
- Nearest metro station: Hauptwache; Konstablerwache; Hauptwache, Konstablerwache
- Major junctions: Biebergasse (West), Pfingstweidstraße (East)

Construction
- Inauguration: 12th Century

Other
- Known for: Shopping, Kaufhof, MyZeil

The Zeil (German: [ˈtsaɪl]) is a street in the city centre of Frankfurt, Germany. The name, which dates back to the 14th century, is derived from the German word Zeile "row" and originally referred to a row of houses on the eastern end of the north side; the name was not extended to the entire street until later.

Since the end of the 19th century it has been one of the most famous and busiest shopping streets in Germany. Before World War II it was also known for its grand buildings, but most of them were destroyed and not rebuilt. The western part of the Zeil is a pedestrian zone between two large plazas, Hauptwache in the west and Konstablerwache in the east. These two plazas serve as major intersections for underground trains, trams and buses. The eastern part of the Zeil, called "New Zeil", connects Konstablerwache with the Friedberger Anlage.

The Zeil underwent a major renovation from spring 2008 until summer 2009. The pedestrian zone was extended to the west as far as the Börsenstraße. This brought drastic changes for motorists because the route via Hauptwache, which is an important north-south connection for individual traffic, was closed.

== Gallery ==
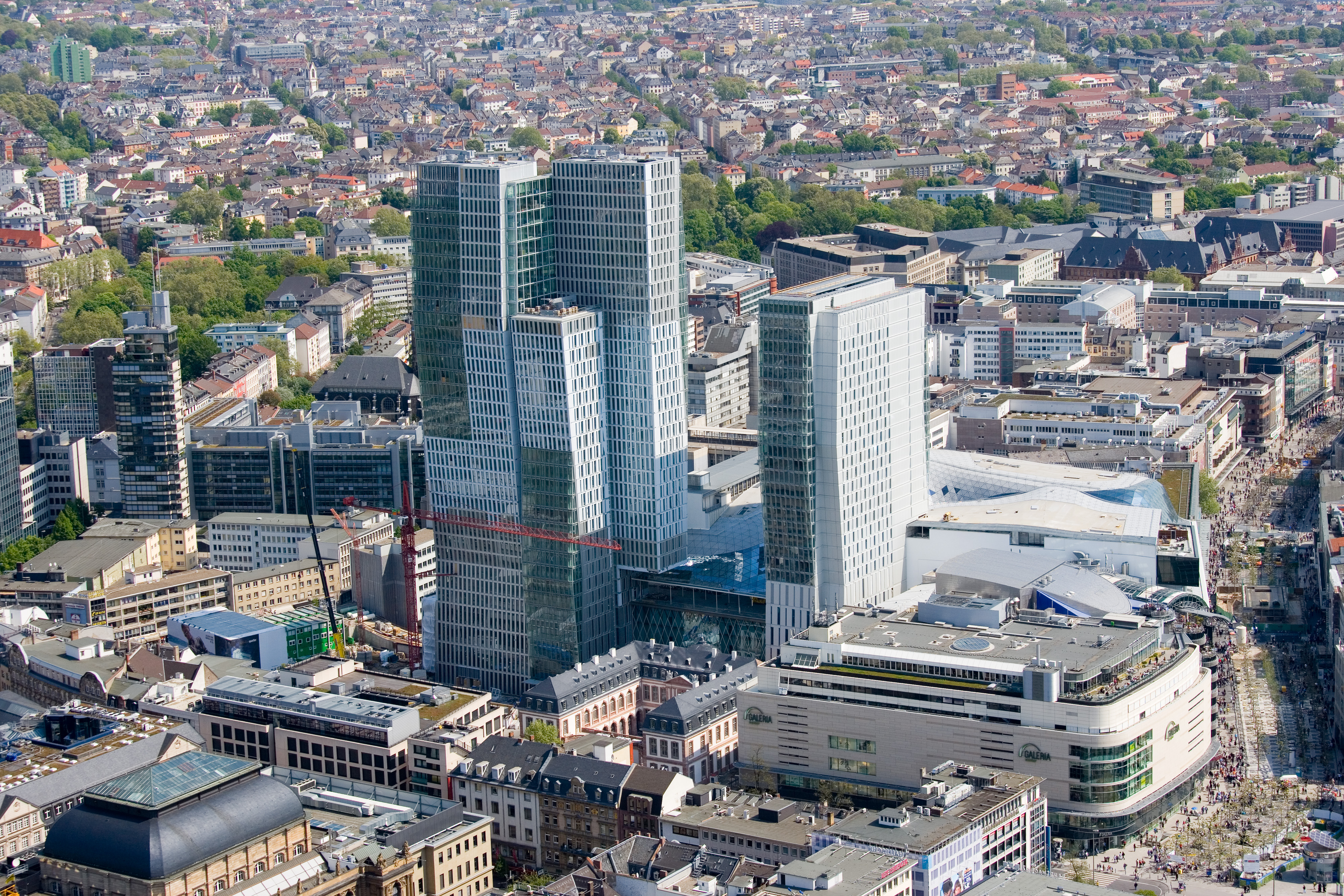
View from Main Tower towards Palais Quartier

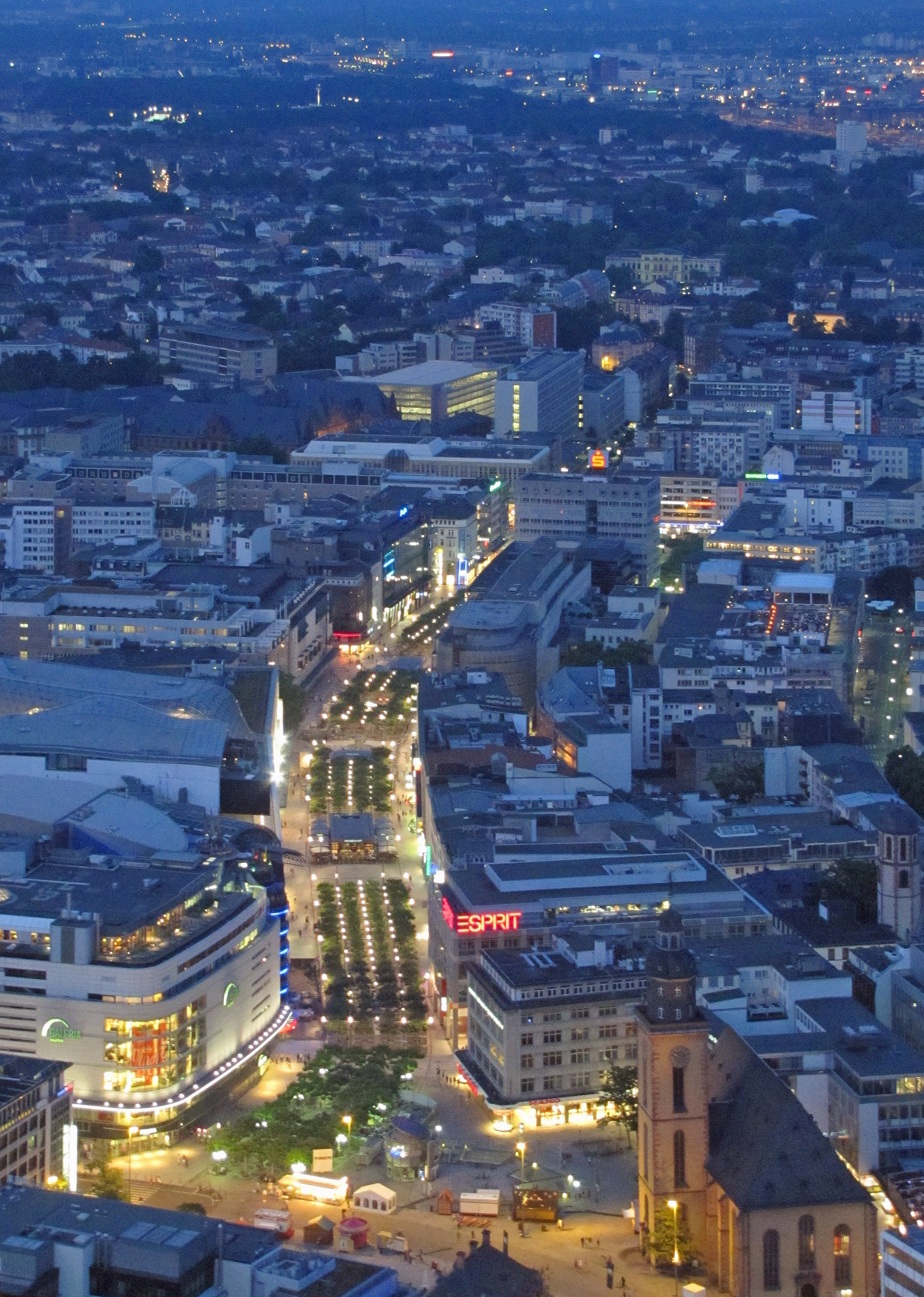
Aerial view of Zeil at night

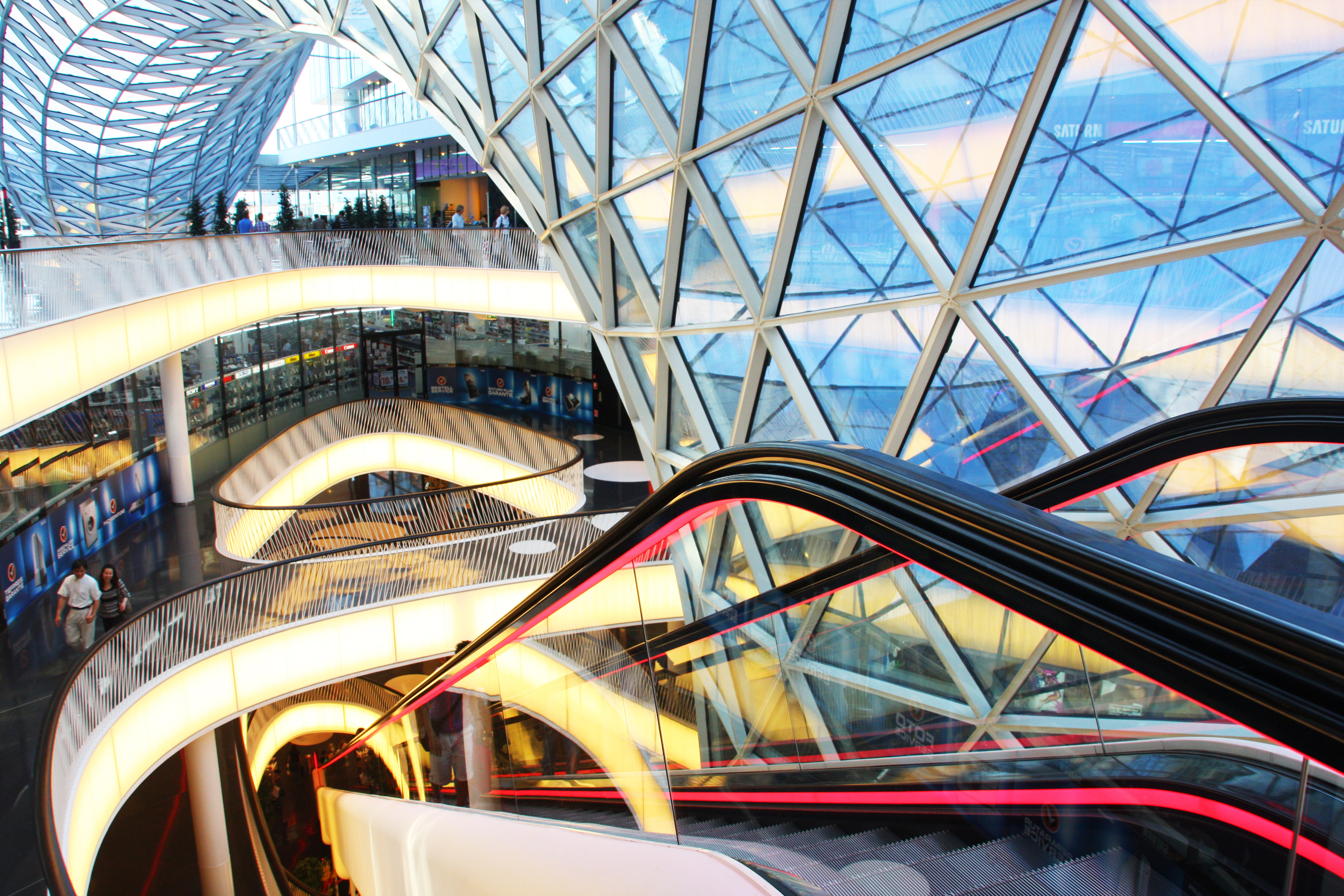
MyZeil shopping arcade

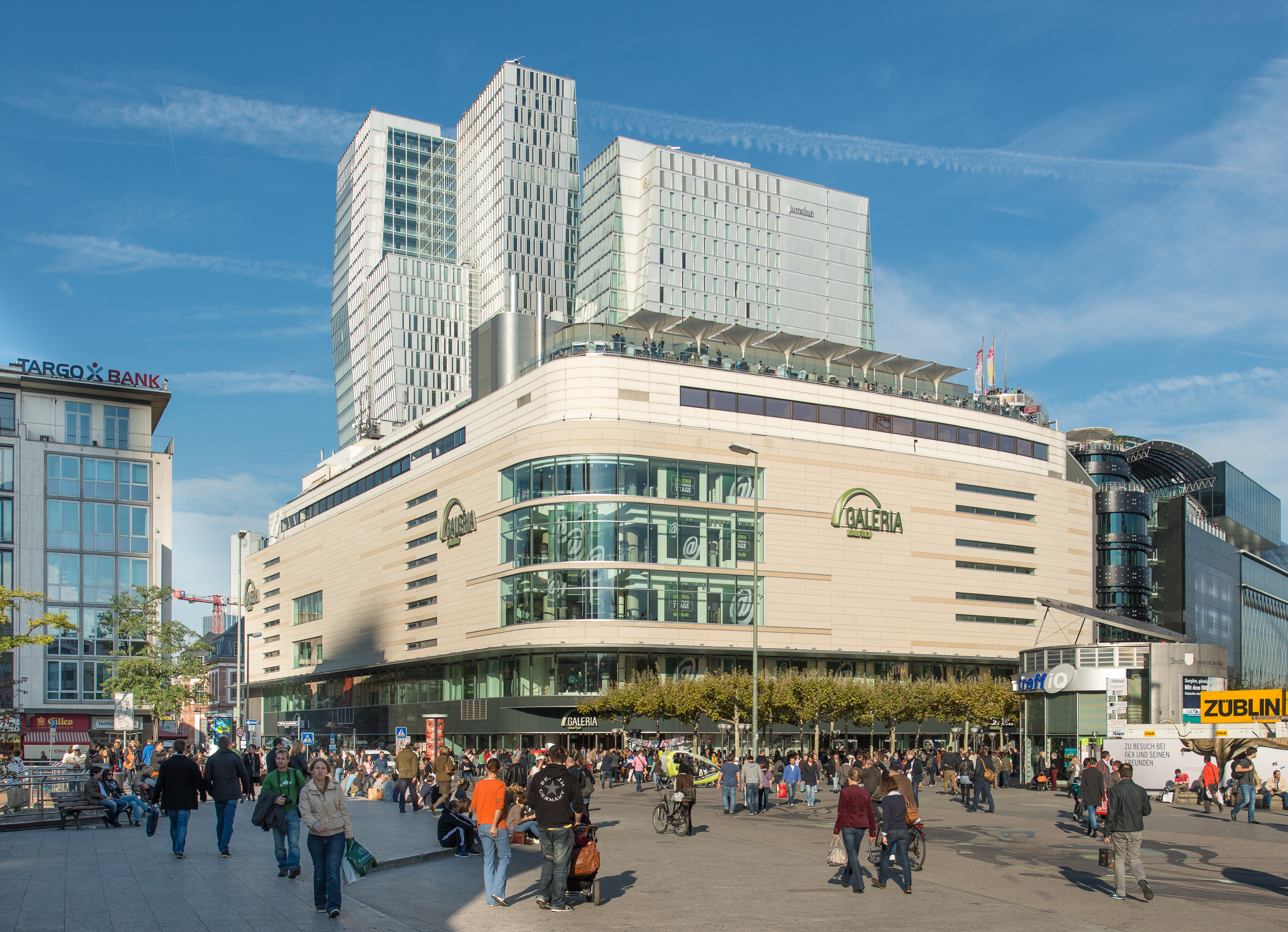
Galeria Kaufhof

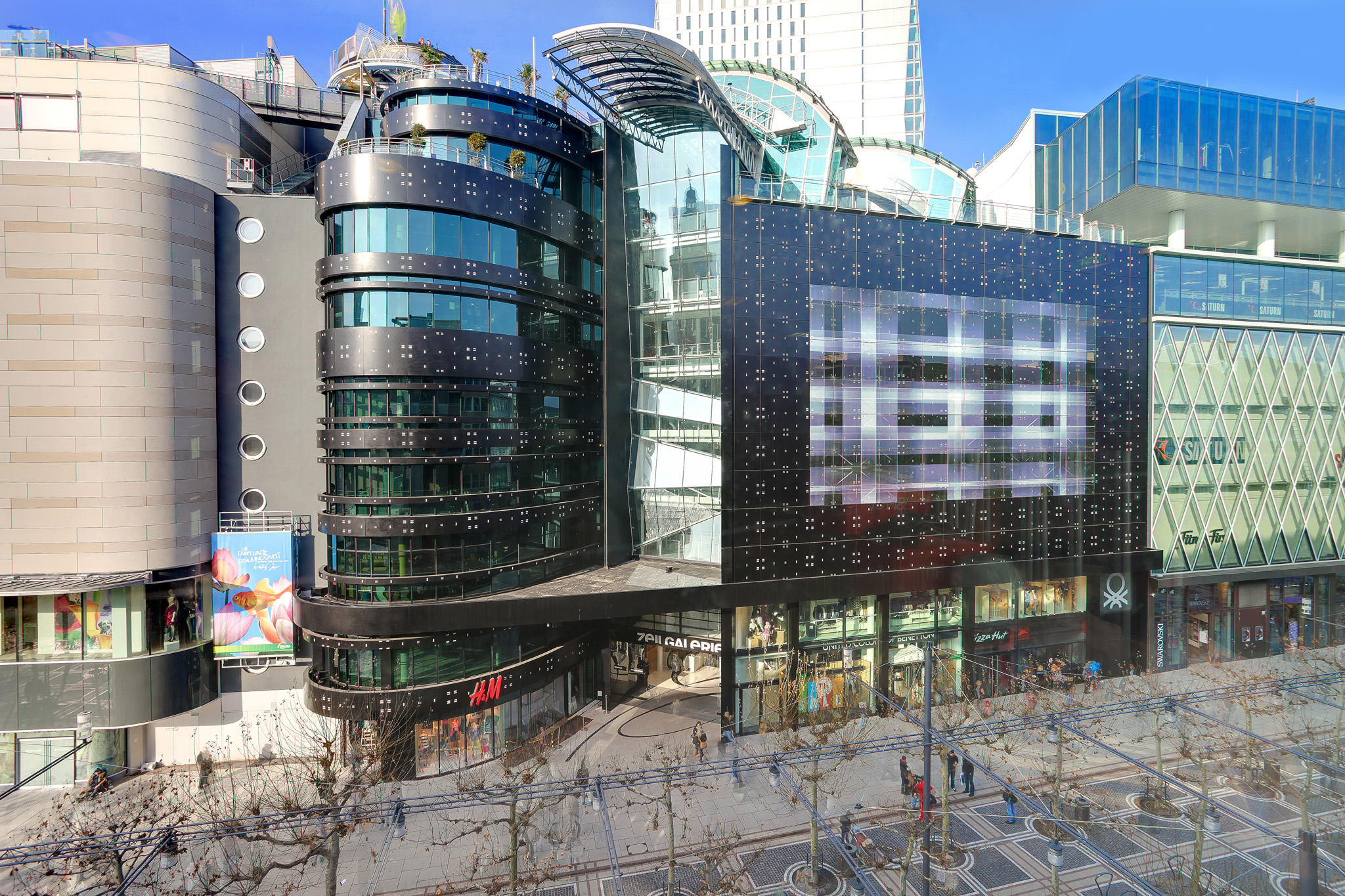
Zeilgalerie arcade (1992–2016)

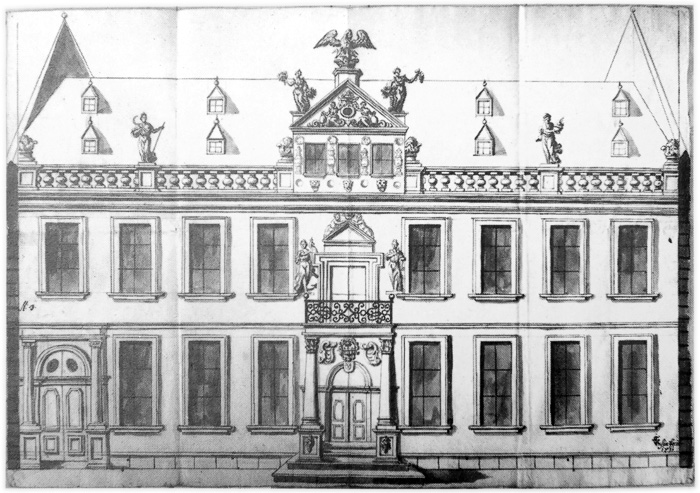
Emperor Charles' residence Palais Barckhaus at Zeil, where he resided in exile (1711)

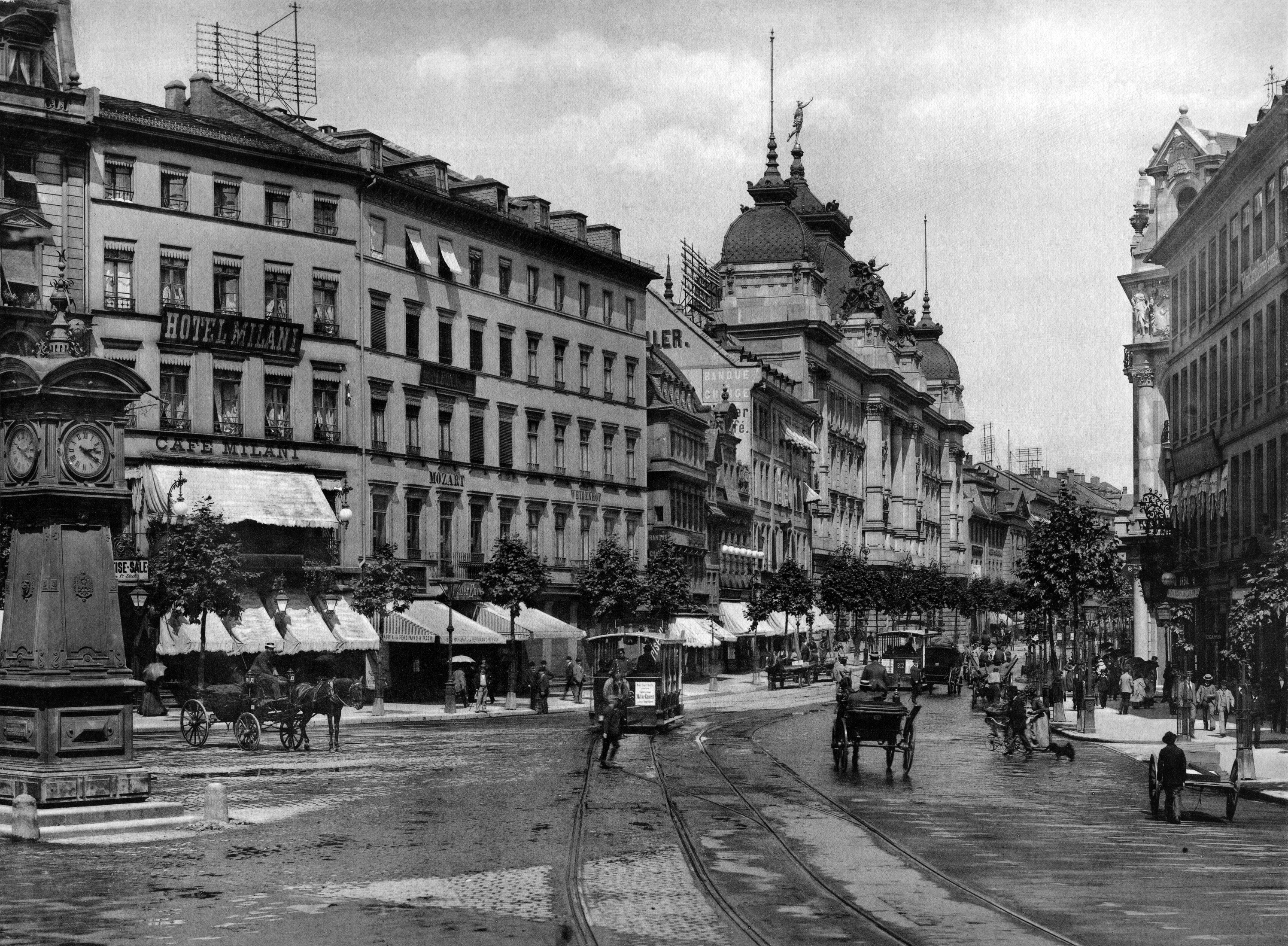
Zeil in 1898

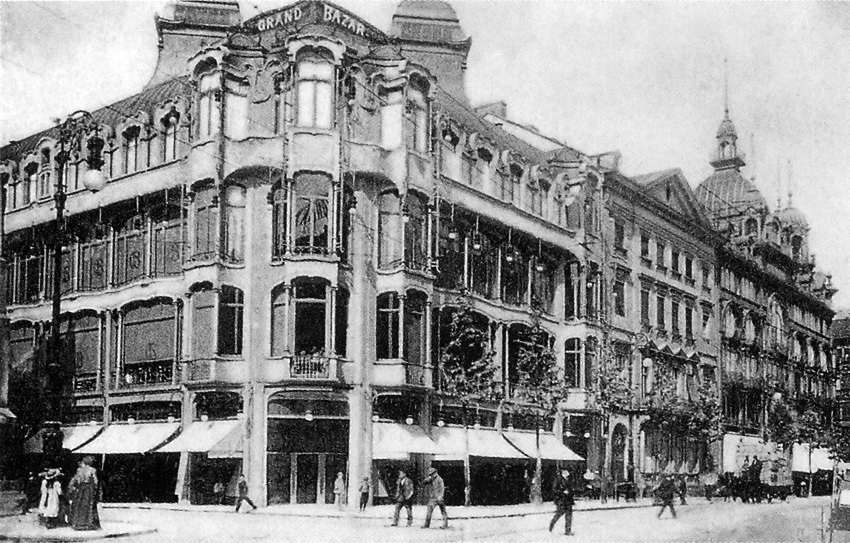
Grand Bazar (1903–1905), Palais Rothschild (1793–1797) and Schmoller (1900), photo c. 1910
