= Willy-Brandt-Platz =

Central square in Frankfurt am Main, Germany

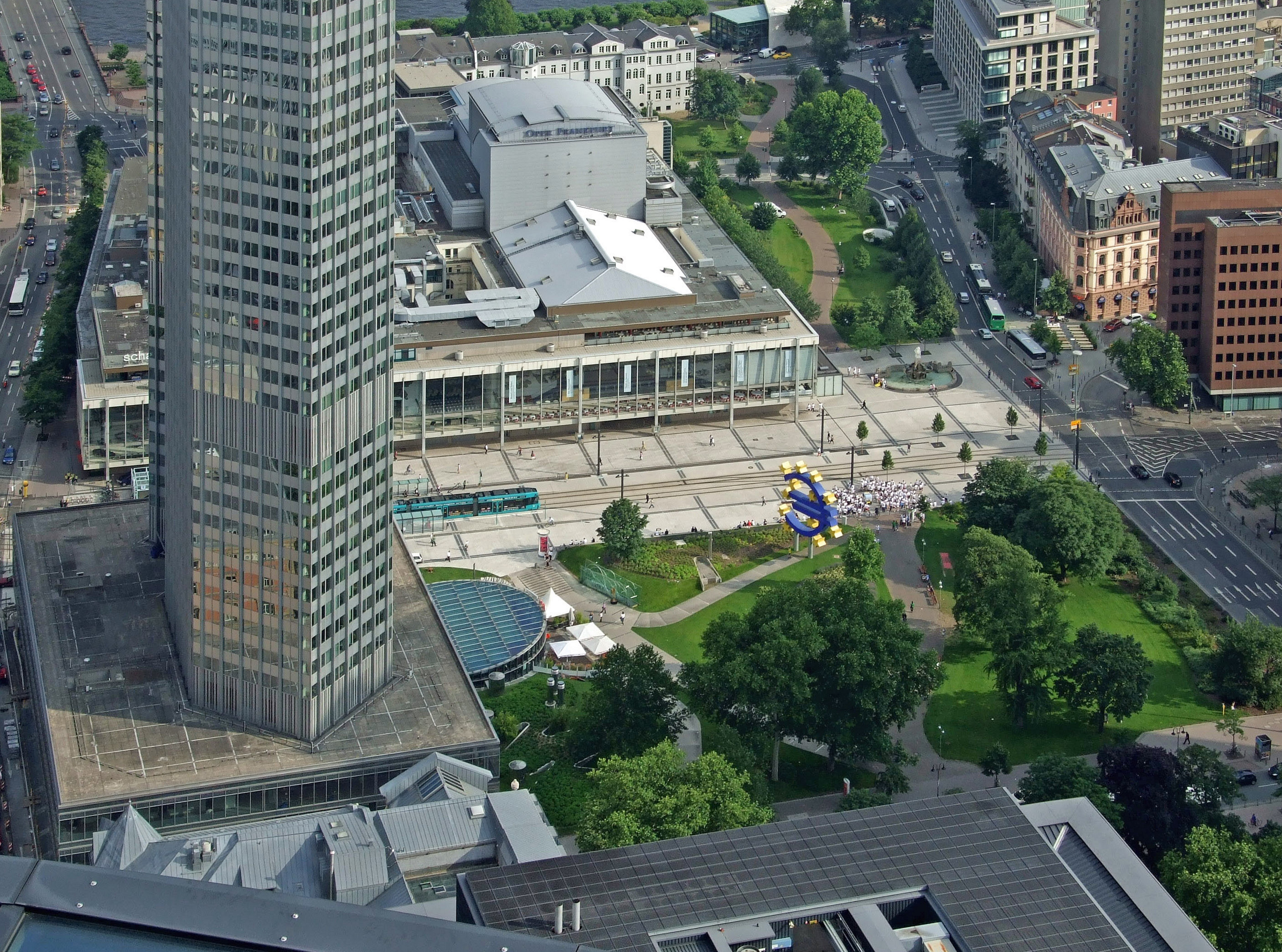
- View of the square from the Main Tower
- Interactive map of Willy-Brandt-Platz
- Former names: Gallustor; Theaterplatz
- Namesake: Willy Brandt
- Type: Square
- Location: Frankfurt, Hesse, Germany
- Coordinates: 50°6′33″N 8°40′26″E

The Willy-Brandt-Platz is a central square in Frankfurt am Main, Hesse, Germany. Its name was Theaterplatz (Theatre square) until 1992, when it was named after Willy Brandt, the former chancellor. It is located between the Main Station and the Altstadt, at the Frankfurter Anlagenring, and is part of the so-called Bankenviertel. Major buildings are the Städtisches Opern- und Schauspielhaus, the municipal theatre that opened in 1963, and the Eurotower skyscraper. Below the square are the U-Bahnhof Willy-Brandt-Platz and the Theatertunnel street tunnel.

== History ==
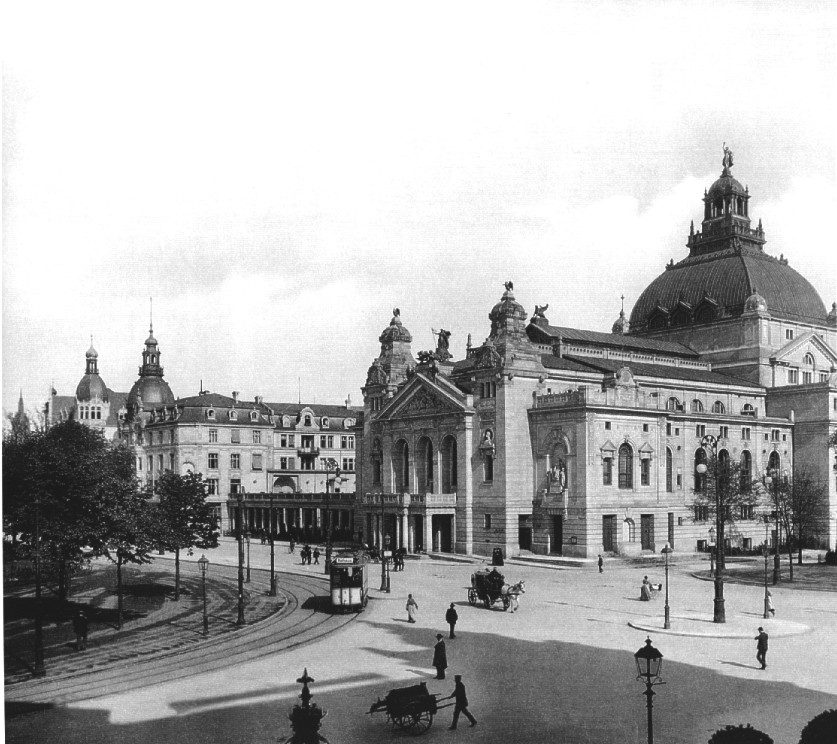
Theaterplatz 1902 with the newly completed Schauspielhaus

The square was the location of a city gate to the West, the Neues Galgentor. The fortifications (Frankfurter Stadtbefestigung) were demolished in 1809. The former fortifications were replaced by a park called Wallanlagen. When the theatre (Schauspielhaus) was completed in 1902, the square was named Theaterplatz. The square was severely damaged during air raids in World War II, in which the Schauspielhaus was destroyed during an air raid in 1944. It was renamed again in 1992 to honour Willy Brandt.

== Description ==
The square is open for pedestrians, the tram, cars, and the U-Bahn below it. Cars were preferred, which led to less flexibility for other parties. The building of the Theatertunnel in 1974 helped to reduce car traffic significantly.

From 2004, when an underground parking lot below the square was completed, it was remodelled to ensure accessibility for handicapped people of public institutions. At the same time, a new lighting system was installed.

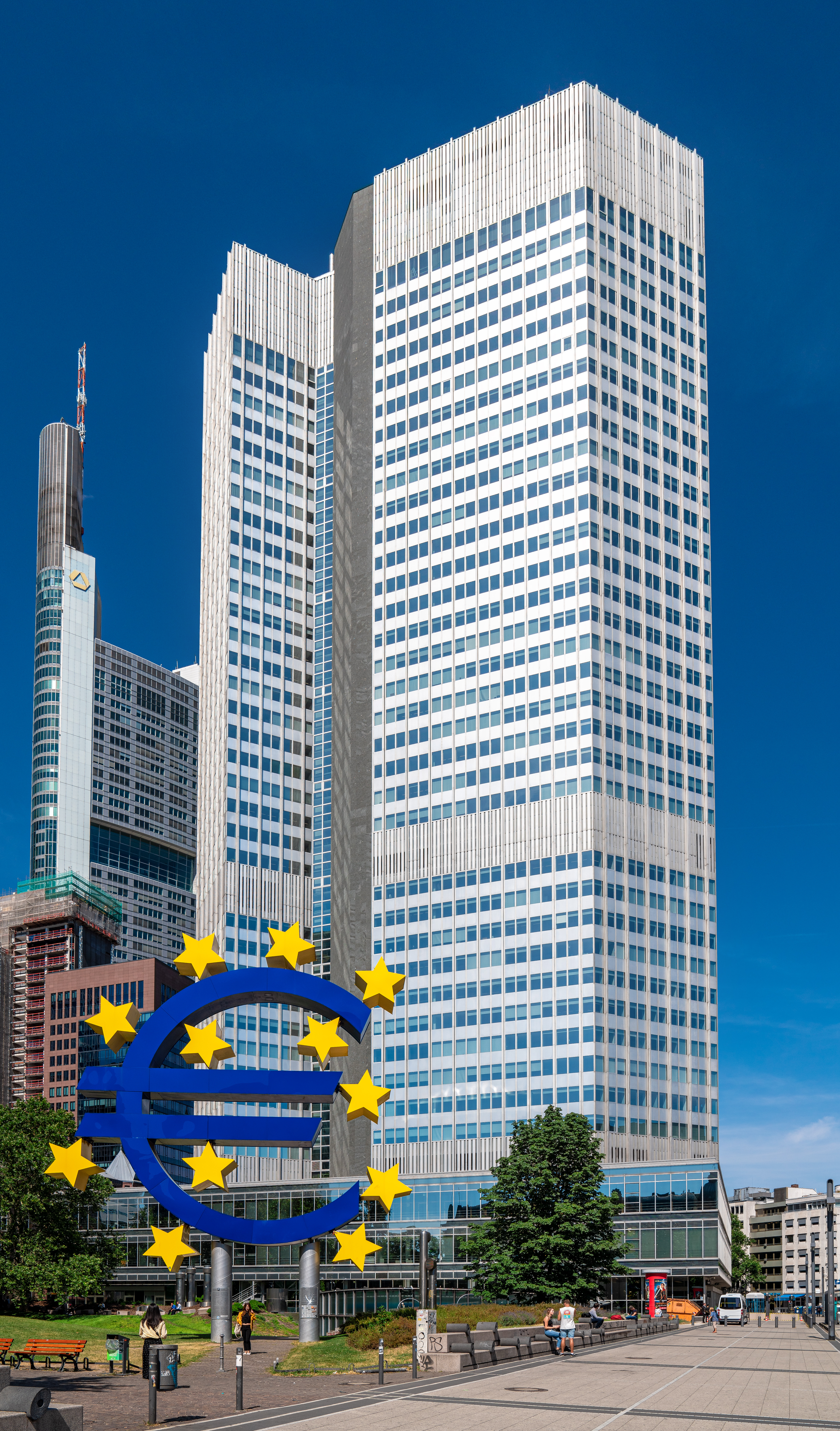
Euro-Skulptur in front of the Eurotower

In the Gallusanlage, north of the square, one of two copies of the monumental sculpture Euro-Skulptur by Ottmar Hörl dominates the park. (Note: The second sculpture, installed at Frankfurt Airport also in 2001, was dismantled in 2012.) The 14 m (46 ft)-high, 50-ton sculpture, consisting of a blue euro sign surrounded by twelve yellow stars representing the first member nations of the European Union, is illuminated at night by 330 neon light strips. The acrylic glass sculpture was installed in 2001. A sculptured fountain, Märchenbrunnen (Fairy-tale Fountain), created by Friedrich Christoph Hausmann in Jugendstil, is placed next to the opera house.

== U-Bahnhof ==
At the U-Bahn station Willy-Brandt-Platz, lines of the Strecke A (U1, U2, U3 und U8) and Strecke B (U4 and U5) connect.
