= Euro-Skulptur =

Outdoor sculpture in Frankfurt am Main

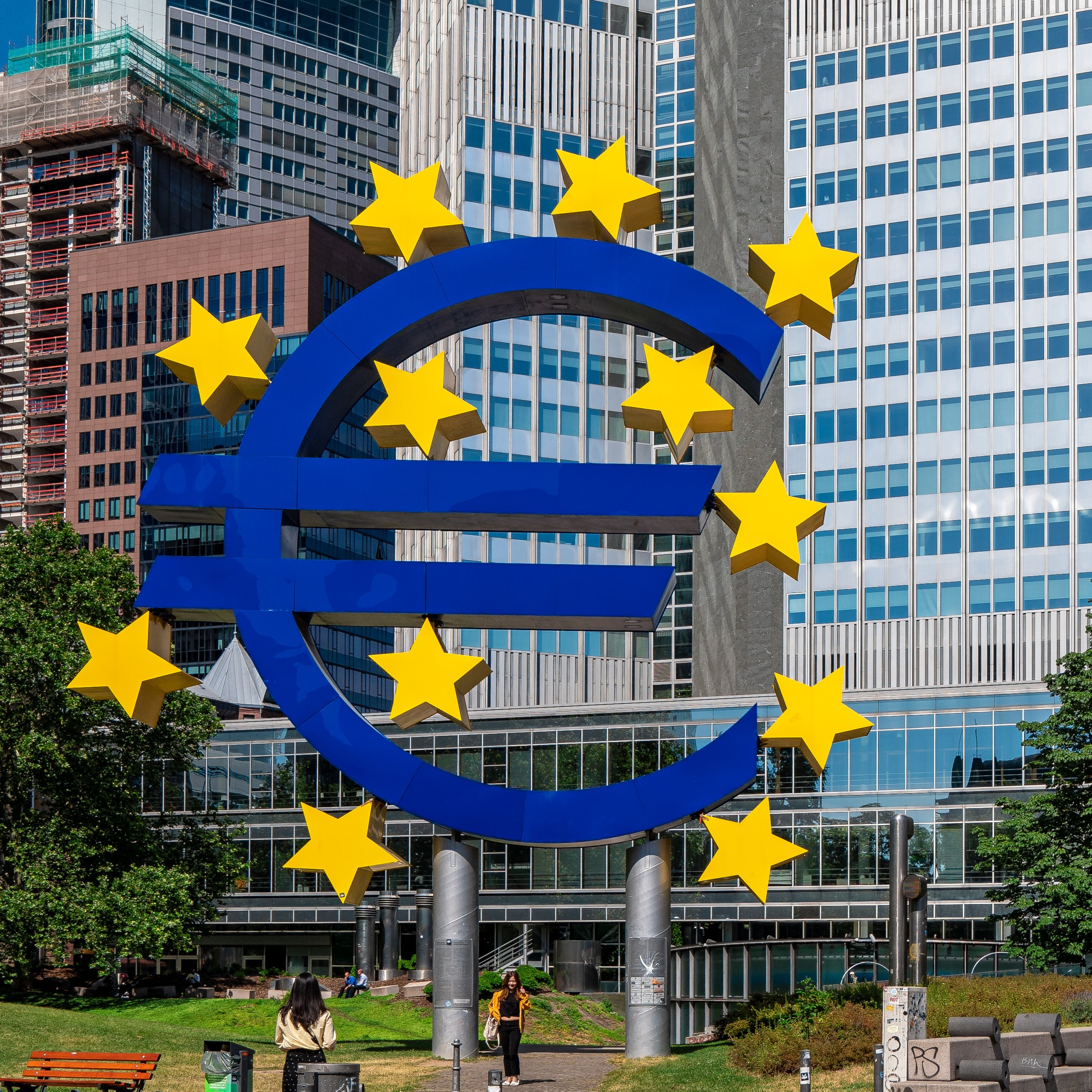
Euro-Skulptur at Willy-Brandt-Platz, 2019

The Euro-Skulptur (German for 'Euro sculpture') set up at Willy-Brandt-Platz in Frankfurt, Germany, is one of two copies of the work that have been put on public display. Designed by German artist Ottmar Hörl, it is a 14-metre (46 ft) tall electronic sign that shows a euro sign surrounded by twelve stars, weighing 50 metric tons (55 short tons).

== History ==
Ottmar Hörl designed the Euro-Skulptur towards the end of the 1990s, creating two copies. While one of these was set up at Frankfurt Airport, he gave away the other version to the private corporation Frankfurter Kultur Komitee which decided to put it on display at Willy-Brandt-Platz in front of the then seat of the European Central Bank, or ECB which was then at the Eurotower. The sculpture replaced the Euro clock that had been installed there before. Its lights were switched on for the first time at New Year 2001/2002 when the Euro was introduced. The Euro-Skulptur is among the objects most often photographed in Frankfurt's inner city.

When the ECB moved from its office at Willy-Brandt-Platz to its new building in Frankfurt's east end in 2014, discussions took place whether to also relocate the sculpture to the new site, or move it to a museum. The Frankfurter Kultur Komitee was also asked to perhaps move the sculpture to a central location in Paris, but so far it has remained at its first location. In 2015, a technical update took place when the sculpture's light-emitting elements were replaced by LED.

The sculpture was described by Frankfurter Allgemeine Zeitung as "never popular with the people of Frankfurt. Too plain, too crude, a work of art with too little art." But the paper also argued that "As long as there is nothing more convincing, it would be wrong to give up what you have. It should be possible in wealthy Frankfurt to extend the life of the Euro sculpture."

In 2022, the Frankfurt Culture Committee, which was responsible for maintaining it, decided to auction it off because it was too expensive to maintain. City of Frankfurt refused to provide funding. Maintenance then was estimated at around €200,000 per year. In September 2022, the Frankfurt Culture Committee announced that the sculpture would be preserved in its original location and the financial start-up Caiz Development would provide the maintenance costs for the next five years. In December 2025 an agreement between City of Frankfurt and the Central European Bank was made public to maintain the sculpture for the future. Maintenance costs of about €50.000 per year will be shared by both parties, while City of Frankfurt will bring up €30.000. Since 2020, the sculpture increasingly gets damaged by people mounting the object, kicking and breaking the glass.

== See also ==
- Statue of Europe
