= Margotton =

Margotton is a French surname. Notable people with the surname include:

- Grégoire Margotton (born 1969), French journalist
- René Margotton (1915–2009), French painter
