= Fairy Tale Fountain, Frankfurt =

German sculpture in Frankfurt

Coordinates: 50°06′30″N 8°40′23″E

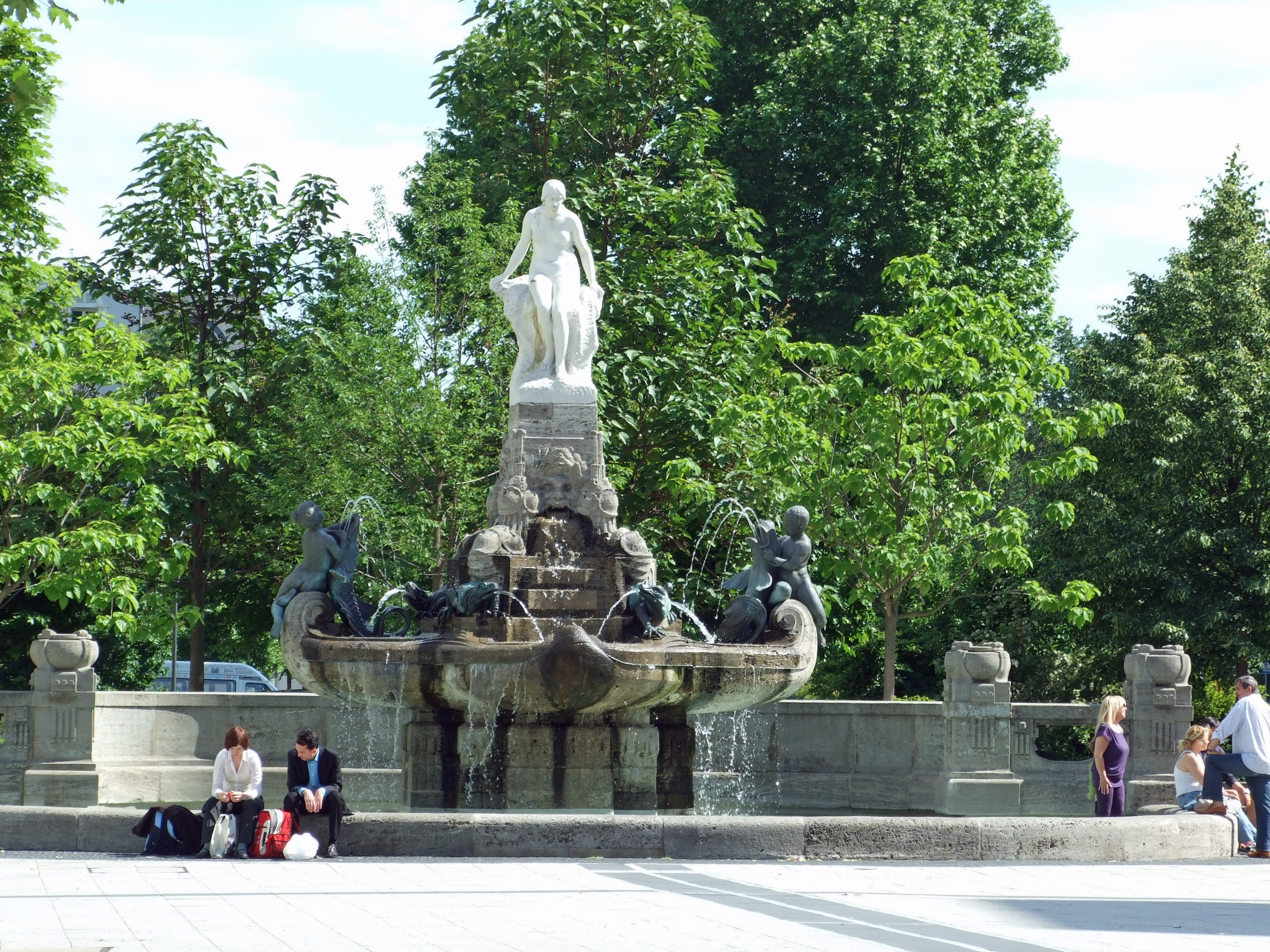
Frankfurt Fairy Tale Fountain

The Frankfurt Fairy Tale Fountain (German: Märchenbrunnen) is an Art Nouveau bronze fountain that is located at Willy-Brandt-Platz. It was designed by Ernst Friedrich Jausmann in 1910. The fountain is notable for its sculptural program depicting characters from well-known fairy tales. These figures reflect the cultural tradition of storytelling and contributes to the site’s popularity. The fountain has become a recognizable feature of the surrounding park and is often used as a gathering point and a location for photography.

== History ==
It was designed by Ernst Friedrich Jausmann in 1910. It originally stood near the former Neues Schauspielhaus. During World War II, its bronze was melted down for metal to create weapons, leaving the monument incomplete for decades.

Based on photographs from the 1920s, the fountain was reconstructed in 2006 by the North Korean firm Mansudae Overseas Projects at the Mansudae Art Studio. Germany commissioned the reconstruction in 2005 for approximately €200,000 (about $264,480 in 2024 value), making it the only Western democracy known to have employed the services of Mansudae for such a project.

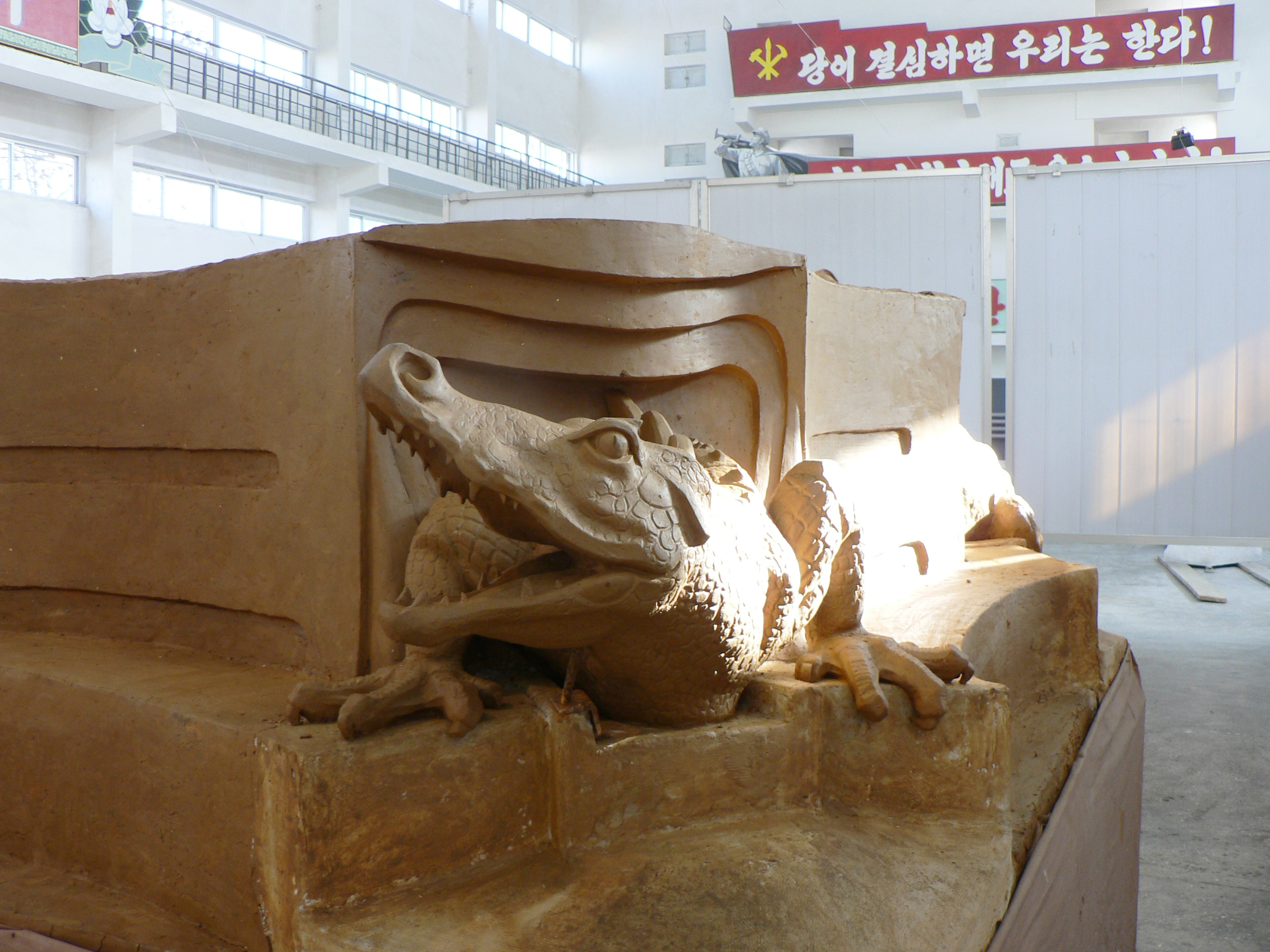
The base of the fountain in Mansudae Art Studios in Pyongyang, November 2005

According to Klaus Klemp, deputy director of Frankfurt’s Museum of Applied Art, the commission was due to the limited availability of German sculptors working in a traditional realist style. The reconstructed sculpture drew some criticism for showing differences from the original, including the depiction of a female figure with a hairstyle considered similar to socialist realist sculpture.

Since May 2006, it has stood fully reconstructed in the Wallanlagen Park west of the Frankfurt Opera House.

== Gallery ==
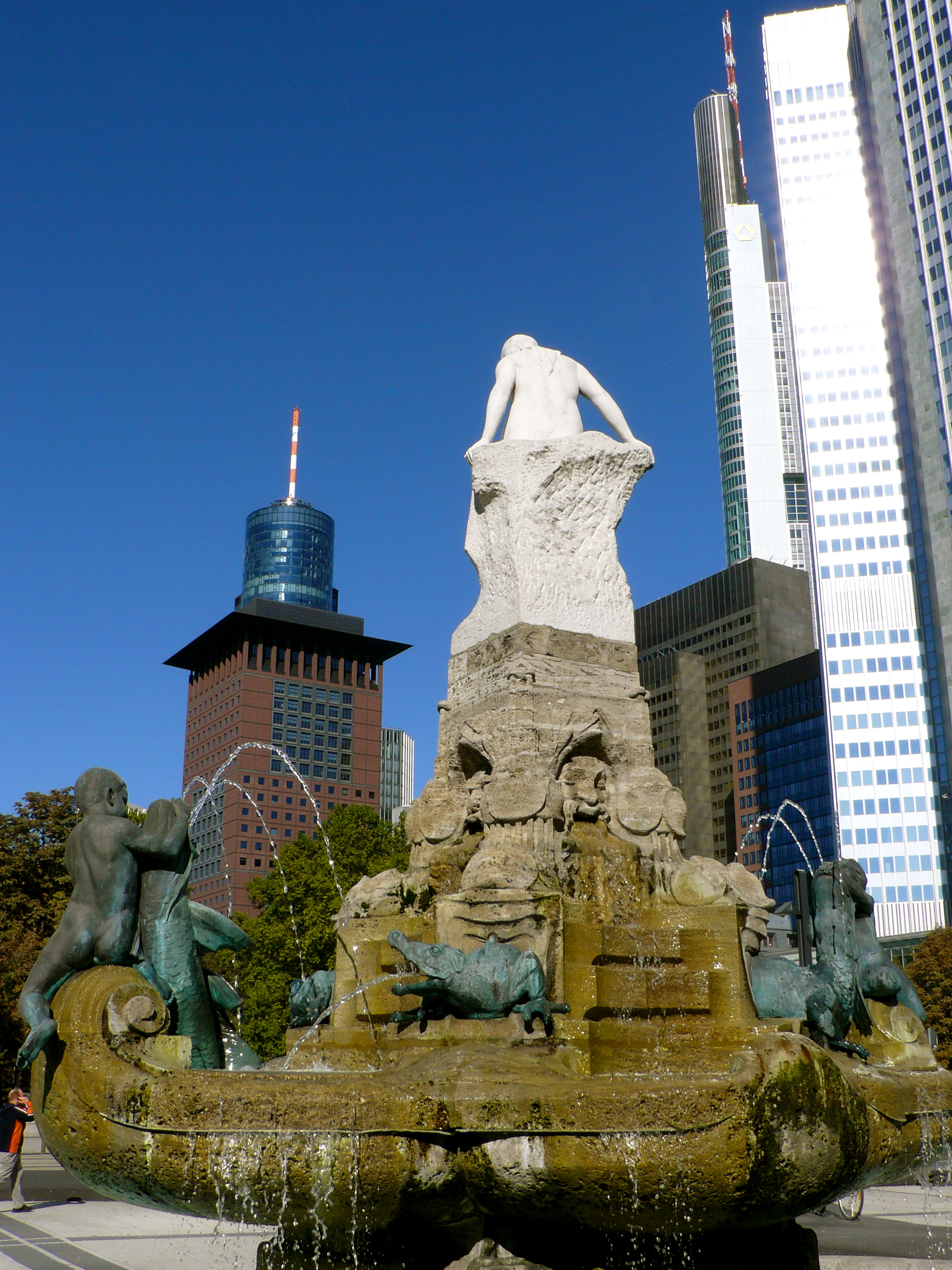
Frankfurt Fairy Tale Fountain

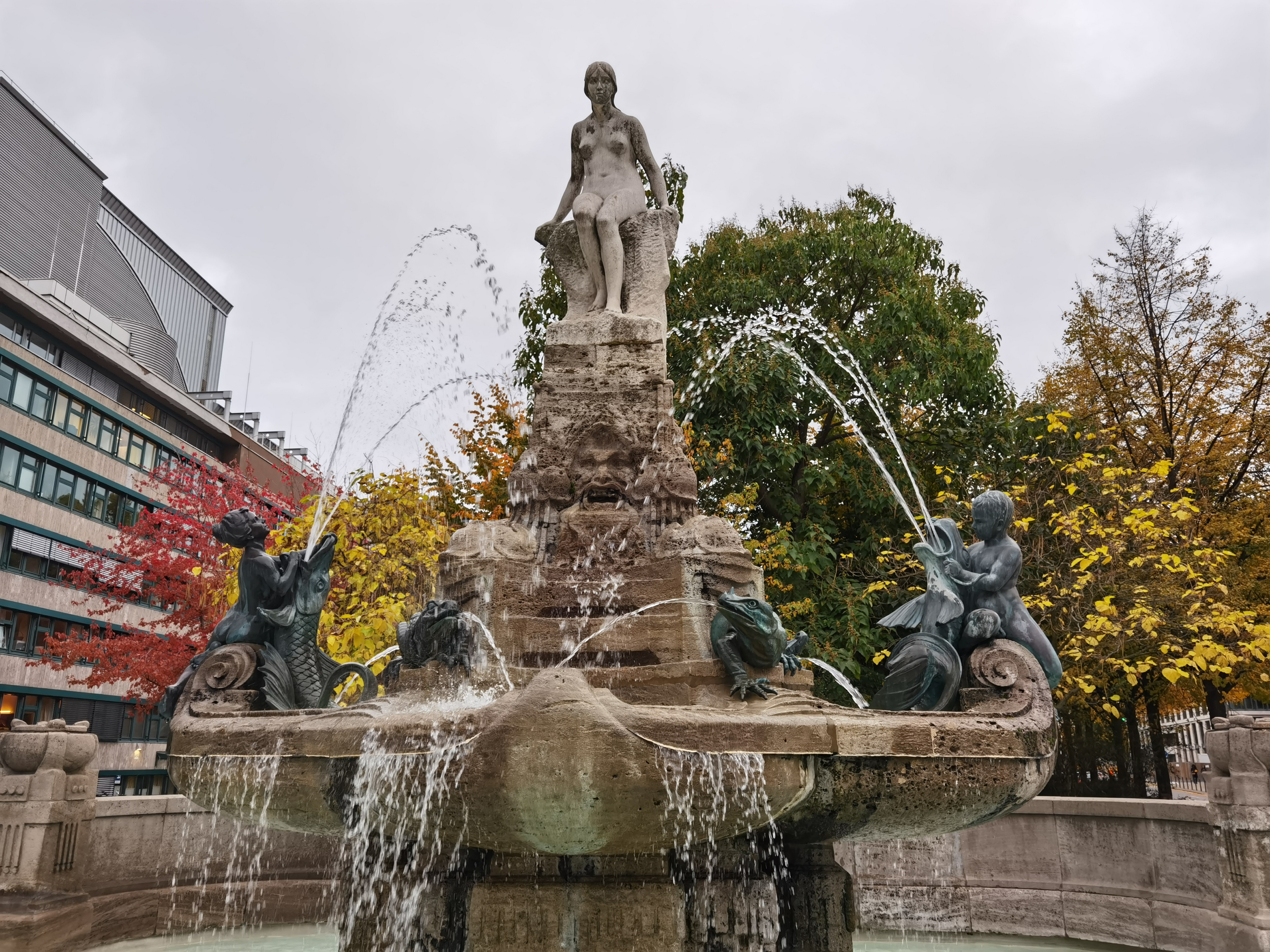
The fountain in 2020

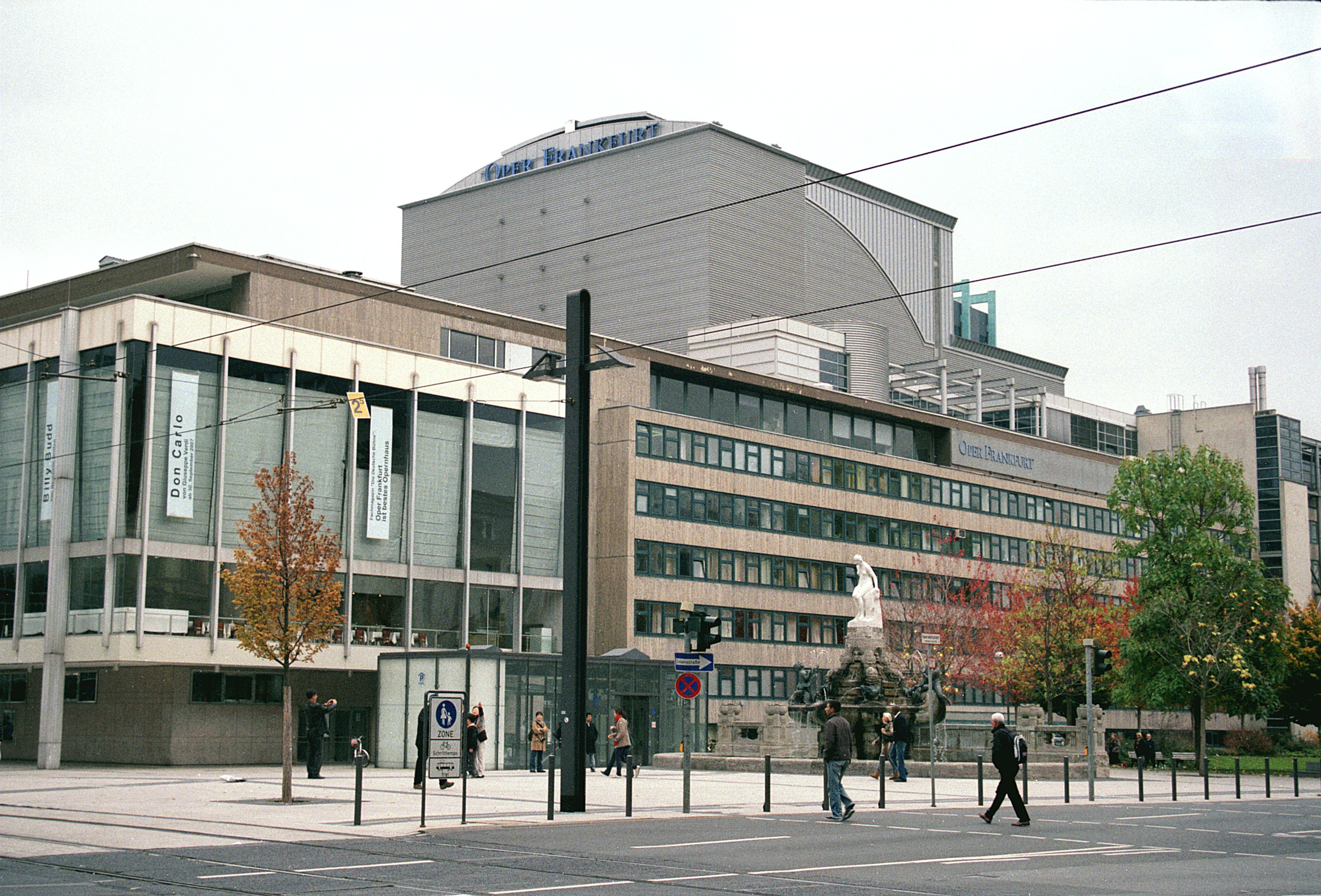
The fountain in front of the Frankfurt Opera House
