= Statue of Europe =

Sculpture by Bernard Romain

Coordinates: 50°50′30″N 4°22′42″E

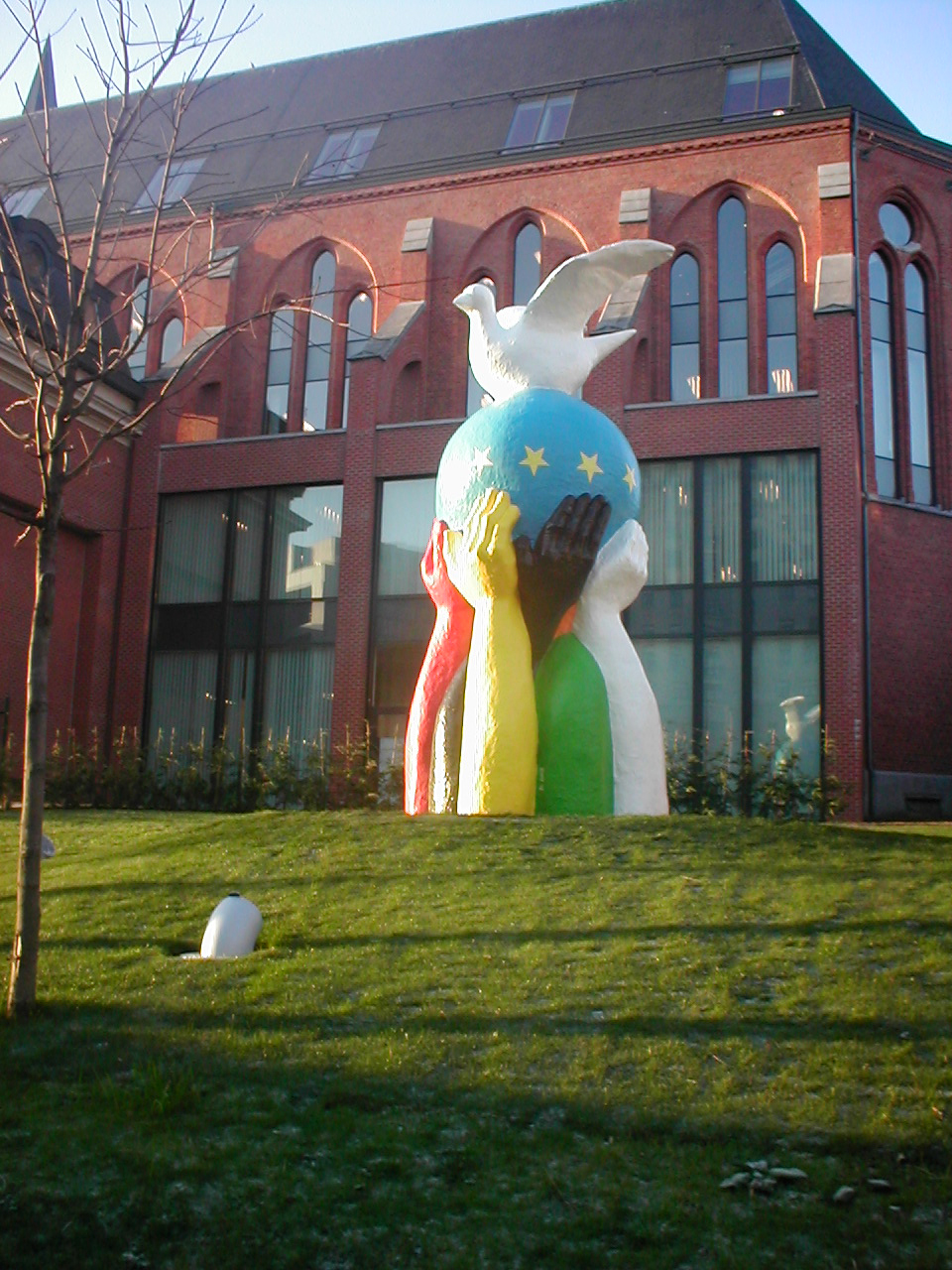

- Artist: Bernard Romain
- Year: 2003
- Medium: Resin
- Dimensions: 500 cm (200 in)
- Location: Brussels, Belgium

The Statue of Europe (also referred to as Unity in Peace) is a sculpture symbolising peace through European integration, while at the same time aiming to demonstrate the motto of the European Union (EU), "United in Diversity". It is located in the garden of Convent Van Maerlant (the library of the European Commission) in the crossroads of the Rue Van Maerlant/Van Maerlantsraat and the Chaussée d'Etterbeek/Etterbeeksesteenweg, in the European Quarter of Brussels, Belgium. Made out of resin, the statue measures more than 5 m (16 feet) and weighs nearly 800 kg (1,800 pounds). It was inaugurated on 9 December 2003 by Neil Kinnock and Viviane Reding, who respectively were Vice-President of the European Commission and Commissioner for Culture at the time. 2003 was the European Year of People with Disabilities, and the Eastern enlargement of the EU was awaited.

The statue was manufactured, modelled, polished, and painted by visually impaired children under the supervision of by French artist Bernard Romain, who wanted to demonstrate that disability was not a disqualifying factor. Tightly entwined, the differently coloured arms symbolise the culturally diverse peoples of Europe, collectively lifting a sphere reminiscent of the EU flag, surmounted by the dove of peace.

== See also ==
- Euro-Skulptur
