= Bernard Romain =

French artist

Bernard Romain son of René Margotton(born in Roanne, on 11 February 1944) is a French painter and sculptor.

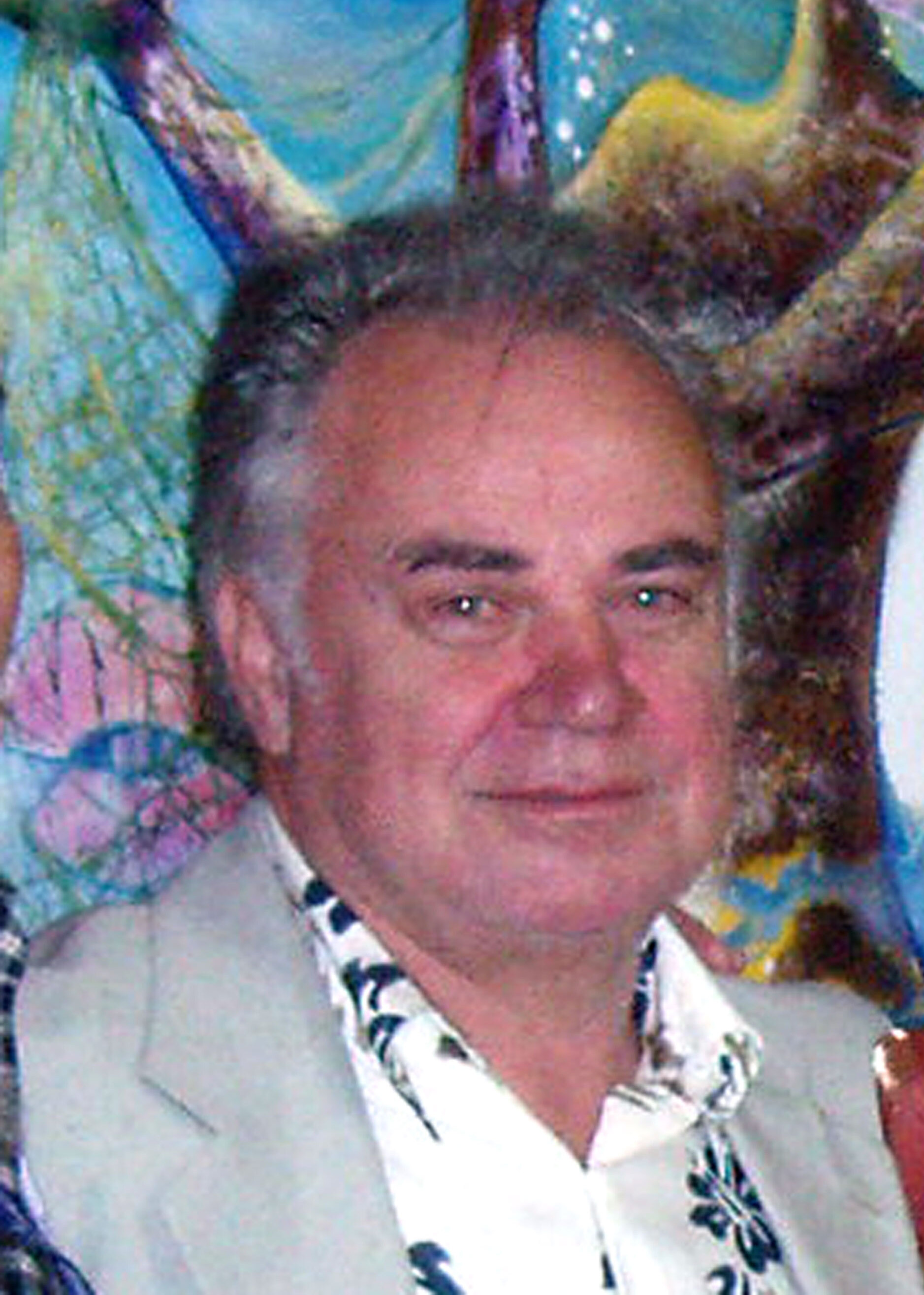
Bernard Romain

Author of the coloring of the tallest cliff of Europe in Normandy (Le Tréport) to commemorate the bicentenary of the French Revolution. He is also the author, of the Statue of Europe "Unity in Peace" of the European Commission. Since completing his art studies in Paris he has held an impressive amount of exhibitions and won various competitions and awards with land art and sometimes extreme work.

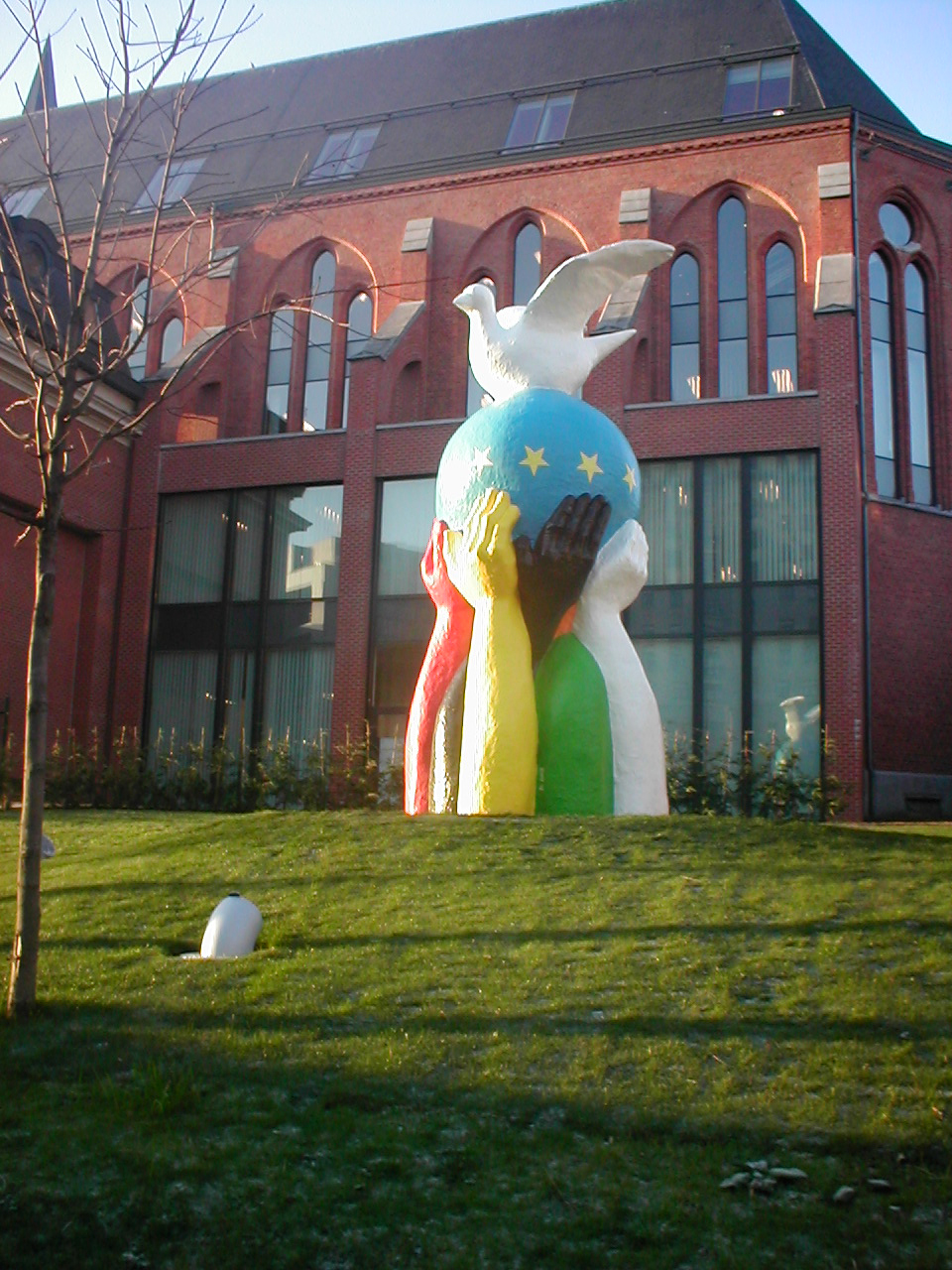
Statue of Europe-(Unity-in-Peace)

== Biography ==
His father was a famous painter and the pupil of Fernand Léger, so Bernard quickly took the pen name of Romain. He arrived at the age of one year to Paris and frequented with his father (a painter of the School of Paris) the artists and the exhibitions on Montparnasse. He studied the graphic and plastic arts in Sèvres then studied in the faculty of plastic arts of Paris-Sorbonne University. Since 1970, he has been dedicated to exhibitions of paintings and sculptures.

== Exhibitions ==
1977 Gallery in Beaubourg, Paris, Gallery Trigeme. 1978 Le Mans. 1979 La Roche sur Yon. 1982 Gallery Gautier Epernay – Gallery of the Cercle Paris. 1983 City hall of Paris III. 1984 Paris-Orly Airport- Negresco hotel in Nice. 1987 Gallery Phoebus. 1988 Show of Melun-1991Val Gallery de Béthune. M.A.I. (International Market of the Art) Le Touquet. 1992 Gallery Romeny Tarbes. 2006 Retrospective, Santiago del Teide in the Fishermen's Museum, the front of which was worked by himself in Tenerife (Canary Islands 2008). La Gomera island. Museum "Javier de la Rosa", Gran Canaria. Tenerife Global Lyceo Taoro de La Orotava 2009. Art gallery of Madrid. Paris, Nice, Antibes, Epernay, Reims, Soissons and the Netherlands, Belgium, Japan. His work was several times presented by the radio and the television.

== Awards and distinctions ==
Knight Arts Sciences Letters – Bachelor's degree of plastic art – International Prize City hall of Neuilly sur-Marne – Prize Studio of the Île-de-France – Prize du Thouet – 1985 Prize of the city of Paris III- Prize of the city of Colombes −1986 Invited of honor of the city of Vanves – Guest of honor by Fiat in 1987 for the launch of Fiat Uno – 1987 Best prize of the Plastic arts, National selection for his sculpture "Freedom" – 2010 Awards a diploma of the Academy Internationale Partenope Federico II (Italy)

- In July 2019 Bernard ROMAIN was appointed Ambassador of TENERIFE (Canary Islands) by President Carlos Alonso Rodriguez.

== Big symbolic works ==
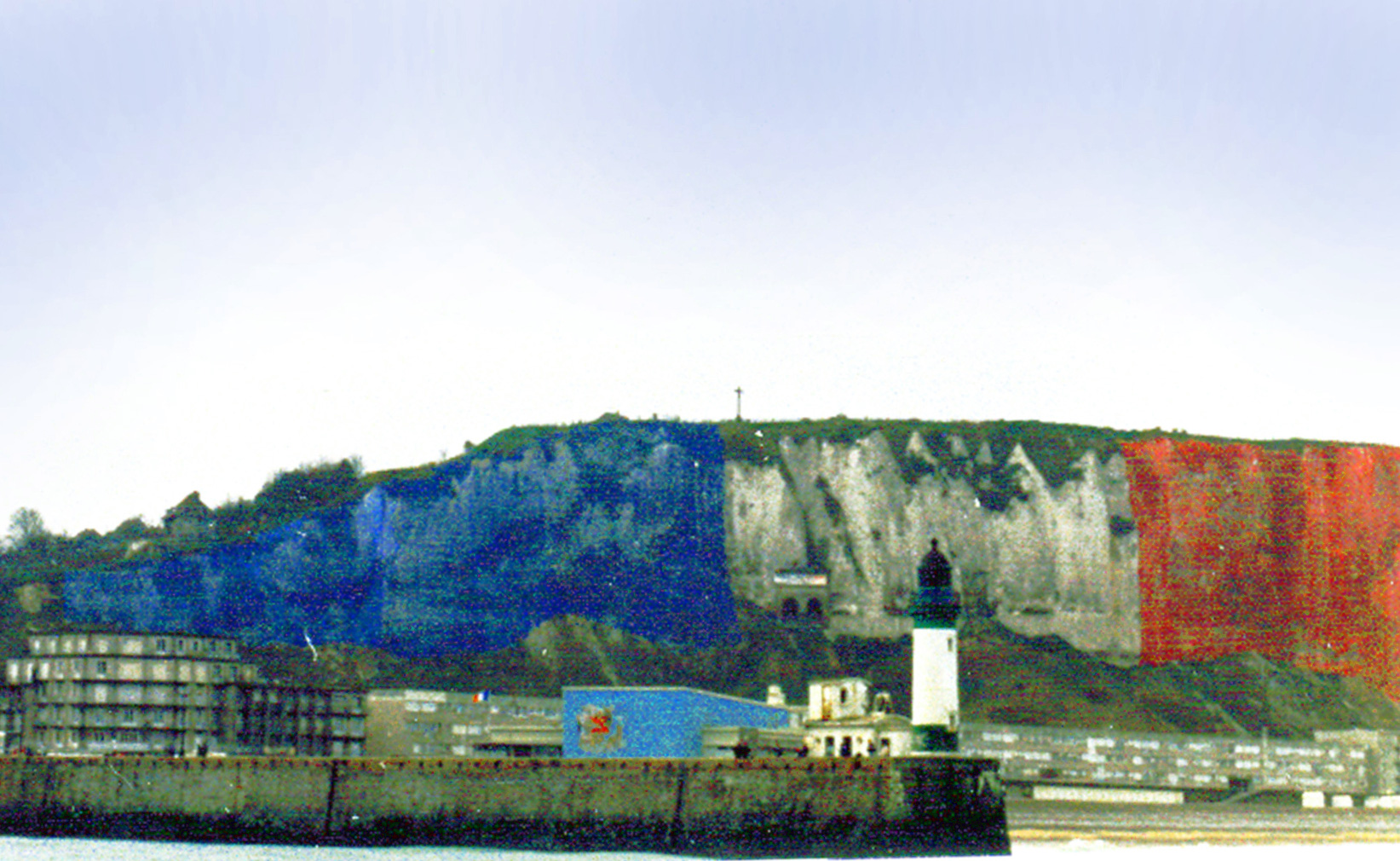
The biggest flag of the world in Normandy

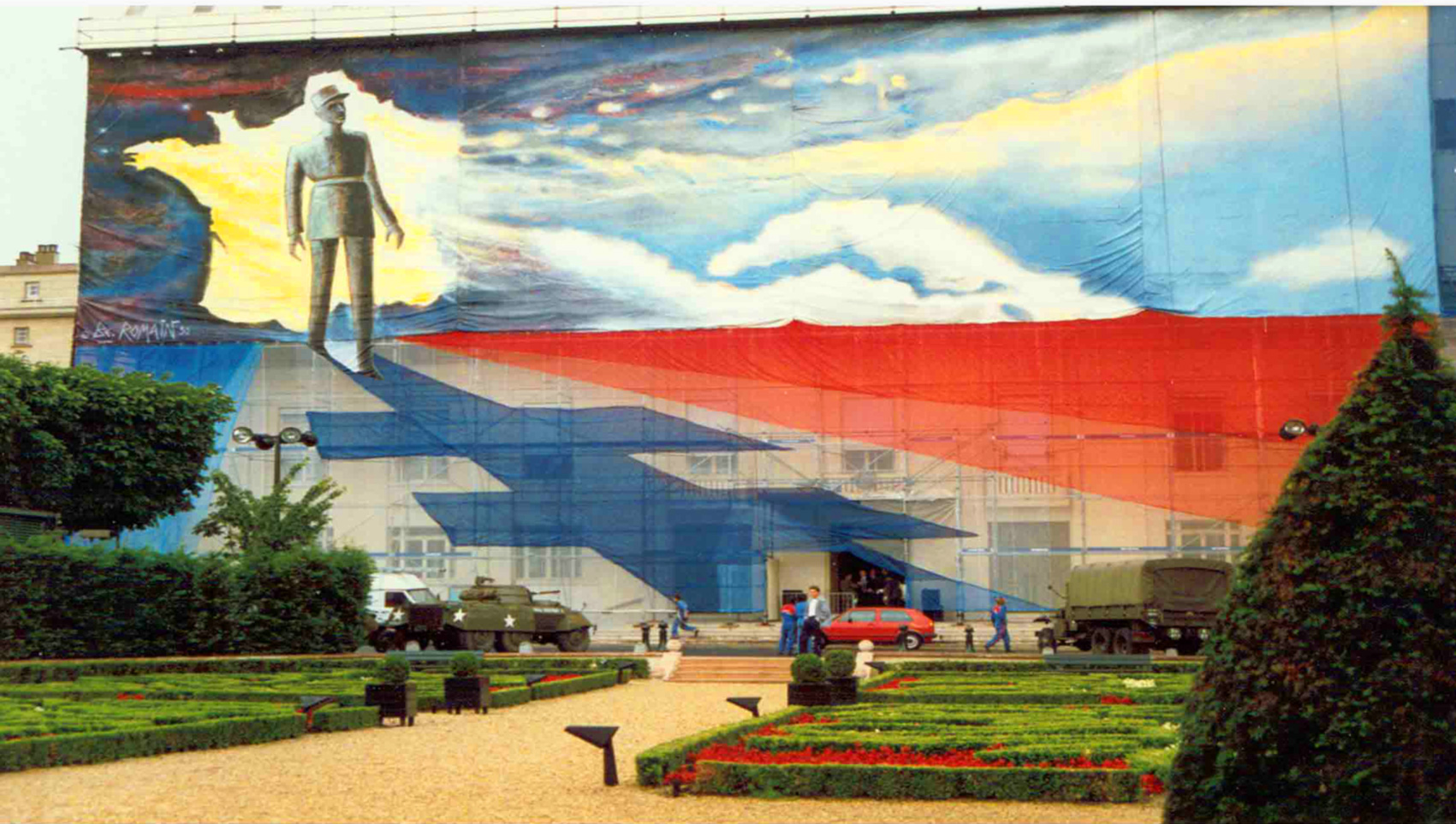
De Gaulle (wall cover)

Romain has made his name in the art world by thinking big. The artist entered into the Guinness Book of records in 1992 when Romain and his helpers turned some of Europe's tallest sea cliffs, in Normandy, into the world's largest flag. Layers of red and blue material, weighing three tons in total, were draped over the cliffs, leaving the white of the cliffs bare and creating the French flag. It took a team of 30 people ten days to complete the hanging, working in up to force six winds, and their success flung Romain into the records. The flag, covering an area of 30.000m2 was constructed to celebrate the 200 years since the French revolution.

In 1989, he dressed in colors the theater of Karlsruhe, enormous building in concrete, for the "European Meetings of the Culture" in Germany. Romain has since turned several whole buildings into works of art, transforming many edifices into colourful, Trompe-l'œil, masterpieces. Often the buildings are local authority premises, such as the Saint Mandé council offices, Paris, for which Romain won the prize for the world's largest mural in 1990. The mural covered an area of 1200 m^{2} and was commissioned to celebrate the year of Charles de Gaulle. Near Tancarville, in Normandy, he composes "the breath of the earth" in Saint-Romain-de-Colbosc. It is the dressing of a public building, by using industrial materials like ready-made.

Another of his well-known works is the Statue of Europe, commissioned by Brussels and which holds centre place Jean Rey in the same town. The statue, named Unity in Peace, depicts various arms supporting the European symbol, topped by the dove of peace. It was designed to represent the ethnic diversity within Europe and as a message of brotherhood, tolerance and hope. Made out of resin, it measures more than five metres and weighs nearly 800 kg and was erected to celebrate the year of people with disabilities in 2003. It was manufactured, modelled, polished and painted by children of different cultures with impaired vision, under Romain's supervision.

In 2016, a replica of the Statue of Europe is inaugurated at Pollestres in France.

== The period of the Canary Islands ==
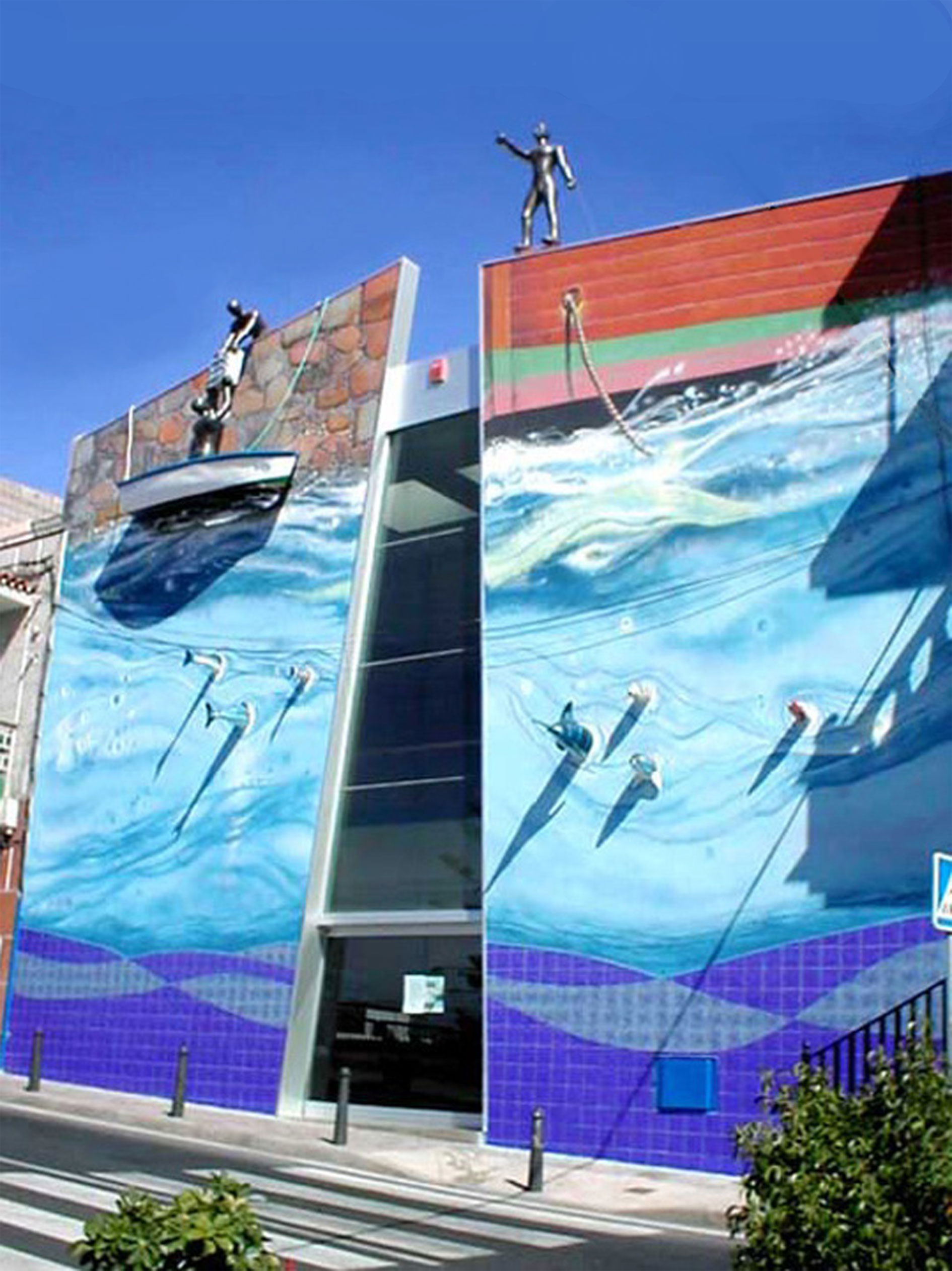
Fishermen's Museum ( Tenerife )

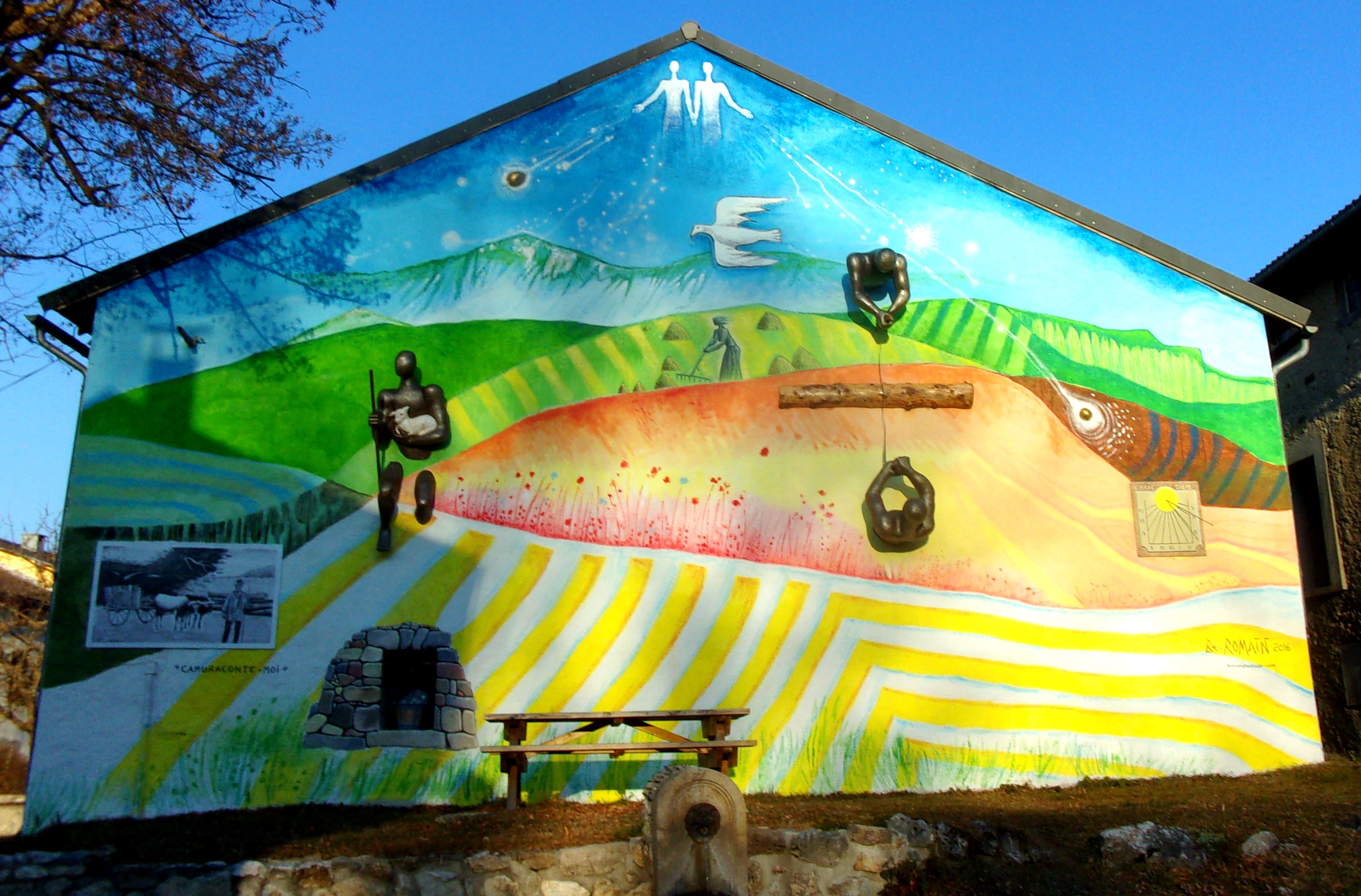
Fresque 3D "camuraconte-moi"(Camurac)France

One of the works of art by painter and sculptor Bernard Romain was inaugurated and blessed at the church of Santiago del Teide the painting, depicting Ferdinand III of Castile. It has been fixed on the exterior of the church of the same name. It is the first in a series of images by the artist, paying tribute to the seven islands of the archipelago, that will be displayed around the town Then, he paints the "Road of the art" on holdest houses of Santiago del Teide. This work presents the seven islands: Tenerife, La Gomera, El Hierro, La Palma, Gran Canaria, Fuerteventura, Lanzarote (island of César Manrique). A traditional Canarian house was torn down to be replaced with the building that became the Fisherman's museum in Puerto Santiago. In 2002 Romain decided the plain fronted, modern edifice needed brightening up and approached the local council with his design. The drab frontage was transformed into a two-storey sea themed mural that incorporates sculptures of fishermen.

He is going to live in Icod de los Vinos, where he installs his studio. There, he prepares numerous exhibitions in all Europe, islands and Spain. It was for him the opportunity to know many friendships and numerous personalities, artists, poets and writers.

== Bernard Romain museum ==
On 6 October 2010, to "Casa Señorio del Valle" (Center of the Visitors "Volcan Chinyero") of Santiago del Teide (TENERIFE: Canary Islands)was inaugurated the Bernard Romain museum.
