= Gemmail =

Type of stained glass art

Gemmail (French, pl. gemmaux) describes a type of stained glass art developed during the 1930s by French painter Jean Crotti. Translated from French, the word literally means "enamel gem". It differs from traditional stained glass techniques in that the individual pieces of colored glass are not joined by lead came, but overlapped and glued together with a clear substance. Pablo Picasso is said to have hailed gemmail as a new art form. Inside the Basilica of St. Pius X in Lourdes, Bernadette Soubirous's "Way of Light", based on sketches by René Margotton, depicts the eighteen apparitions together with scenes from her life.
