= Basilica of St. Pius X =

Basilica in Lourdes, France

Basilica of Saint Pius X Basilique Saint Pie X (in French)
- View along the nave towards the central sanctuary.

Religion
- Affiliation: Roman Catholic
- Ecclesiastical or organisational status: Minor basilica
- Year consecrated: 1958

Location
- Location: (France) Lourdes
- Interactive map of Basilica of Saint Pius X Basilique Saint Pie X (in French)
- Coordinates: 43°05′50″N 00°03′13″W

Architecture
- Architects: Pierre Vago, Eugene Freyssinet
- Type: Church
- Completed: 1957
- Construction cost: $5.6 million
- Capacity: 25000

Website
- Official website

The Basilica of Saint Pius X, informally known as the Underground Basilica, is a Catholic church and minor basilica in the town of Lourdes, France. It is part of the Sanctuary of Our Lady of Lourdes, a major pilgrimage site. The Basilica of St. Pius X is the largest of the sanctuary's churches. It was completed in 1958 in anticipation of the enormous crowds expected in Lourdes for the centenary of the Lourdes apparitions.

== History ==
The consecration of the basilica was on March 25, 1958 by Cardinal Angelo Roncalli, who was earlier the papal nuncio to France, then Patriarch of Venezia, and who later became Pope John XXIII. The consecration year was selected to celebrate the centenary of the 18 visions of the Virgin Mary experienced by Bernadette Soubirous.

== Description ==
The basilica is a modern, concrete building and is almost entirely underground (part of the building lies beneath the Boulevard Père Rémi Sempé). The basilica is the largest of the sanctuary's churches and one of the largest churches inspired by visions of Jesus and Mary.

=== Dimensions and capacity ===
The Basilica was designed by the architect Pierre Vago. The nave is oval and slopes gently upwards from the centre, where the sanctuary is situated on a raised platform. The ceiling is low, and is supported by 58 pre-stressed concrete pillars which meet 29 concrete beams which cross the ceiling, giving it the impression of an upturned ship. This design creates a large open space which can accommodate up to 25,000 worshippers.

=== Interior decoration ===
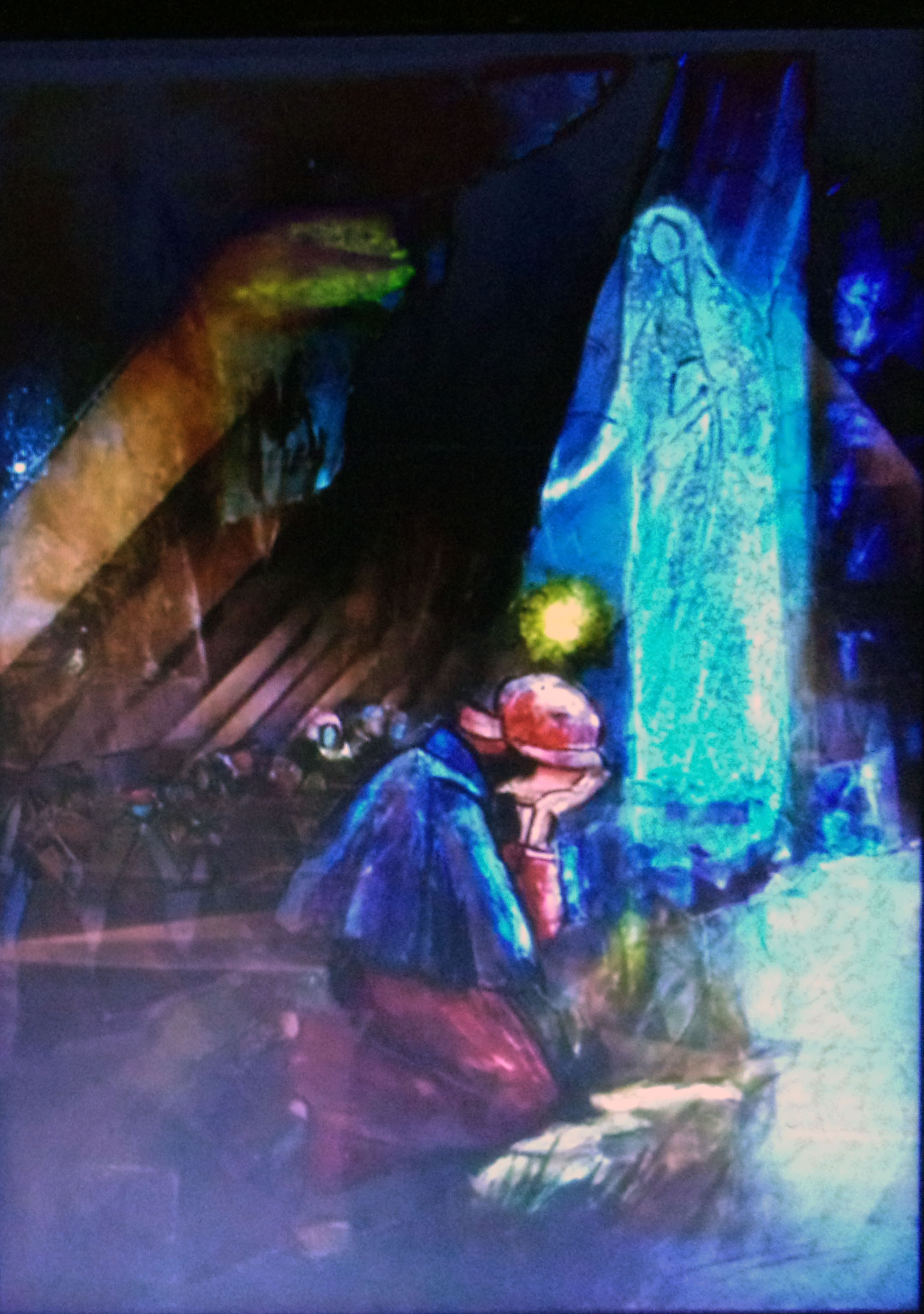
Lourdes Bernadette Gemmail (René Margotton)

On the walls there are 52 images in the gemmail style of overlapping stained glass. On the west ramp are the 15 traditional Mysteries of the Rosary, and on the east ramp are the Stations of the Cross, designed by Denys de Solère. On the lower part of the east side is the series "Bernadette's Way of Light", based on sketches by René Margotton, which depict the eighteen apparitions together with two scenes from her life. There are two further images, one on each side of the entrance to the sacristy.
