= Eurotower (Frankfurt am Main) =

Skyscraper in Frankfurt, Germany

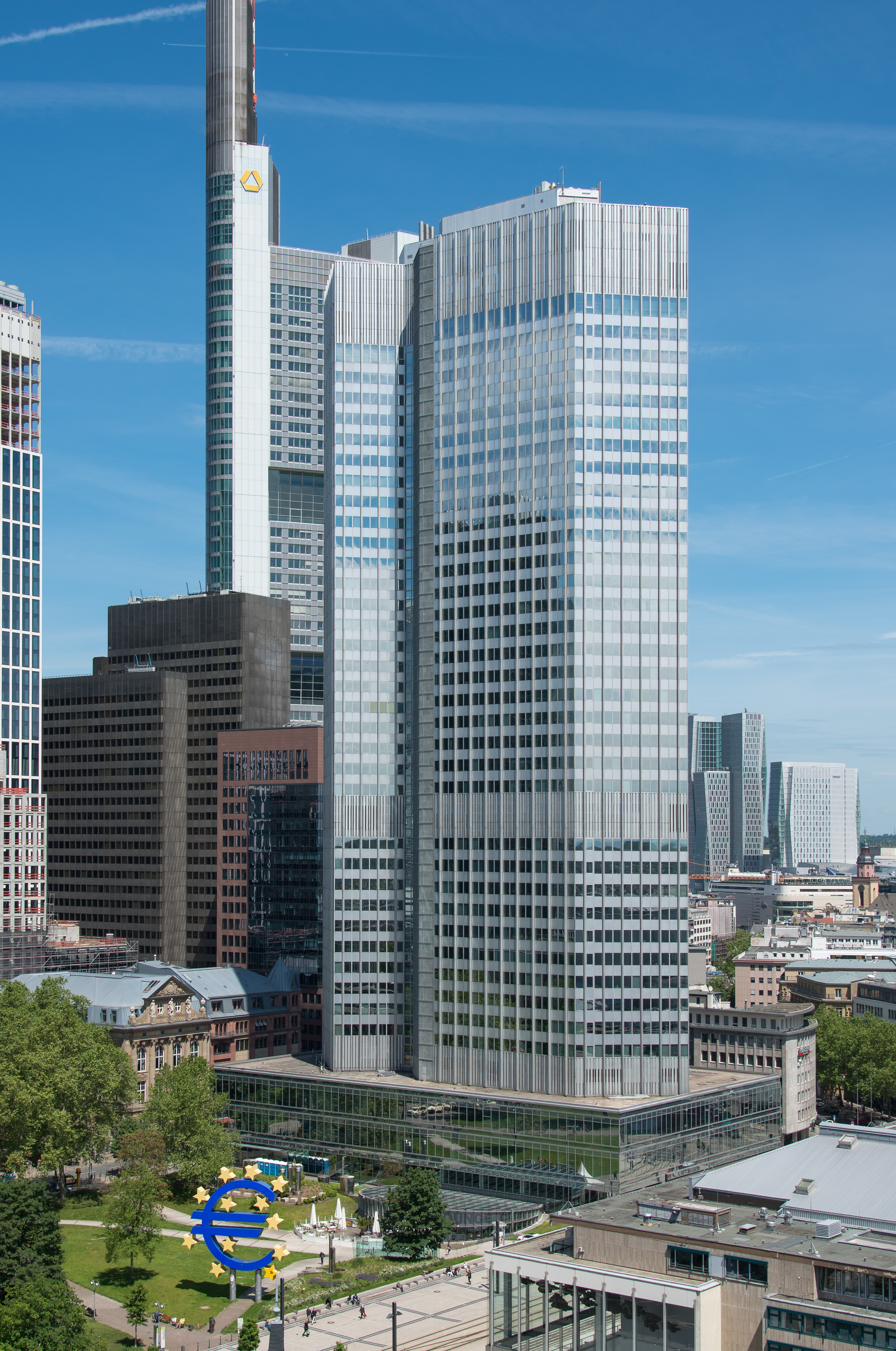
- Interactive map of the Eurotower area

General information
- Type: Government offices
- Architectural style: Modernism
- Location: Kaiserstraße 29; Frankfurt; Hesse, Germany
- Coordinates: 50°06′34″N 8°40′26″E
- Completed: 1977

Height
- Roof: 148 m (486 ft)

Technical details
- Floor count: 39; 5 below ground
- Floor area: 46,630 m^{2} (501,900 sq ft)
- Lifts/elevators: 16

Design and construction
- Architects: Richard Heil; Johannes Krahn
- Engineer: Philipp Holzmann; Walter Bau AG; König Heunisch und Partner
- Main contractor: Philipp Holzmann

Other information
- Public transit access: Willy-Brandt-Platz; 11 Willy-Brandt-Platz

The Eurotower is a 40-storey, 148 m (486 ft) skyscraper in the Innenstadt district of Frankfurt, Germany. The building served as the seat of the European Central Bank (ECB) until 18 March 2015, at which point it was officially replaced by a new purpose-built building. It hosted ECB Banking Supervision until 2025.

The building is located at Willy-Brandt-Platz in Frankfurt's central business district, the Bankenviertel, opposite to the Opern- und Schauspielhaus Frankfurt. Right next to the building is an underground U-Bahn station and an above-ground tram station.

== History ==
The tower was designed by architect Richard Heil and was built between 1971 and 1977. The first main tenant was the Bank für Gemeinwirtschaft. The building was later used by the European Monetary Institute, the forerunner of the European Central Bank that was established in 1998.

Until 2013, a club/restaurant called Living XXL was situated in the basement.

Because of the limited space in the Eurotower the personnel of the ECB were also (up to March 2015) distributed between two other skyscrapers in the Bankenviertel, the Eurotheum and Neue Mainzer Straße 32–36. This was considered less than optimal, so in the late 1990s the ECB began a process to have a new seat built on a site in the eastend of Frankfurt. This was originally envisaged to bring together all the bank's personnel in one place, however with the increase in the ECB's responsibilities with the entry into force of European Banking Supervision, the ECB will retain its presence in the Eurotower after its refurbishment. Construction of the new tower started in 2008 and was completed in late 2014. In November of that year bank personnel started to transfer from the Eurotower to their new offices at the Seat.

The building has since been hosting the European Central Bank's supervisory arm, with around 1,400 employees working from the site. In 2023, the bank announced plans to abandon the building and move to the Gallileo tower by 2025.

== See also ==
- European Central Bank
  - Seat of the European Central Bank
- Institutional seats of the European Union
- List of tallest buildings in Germany
- List of tallest buildings in Frankfurt
