= René Margotton =

French painter

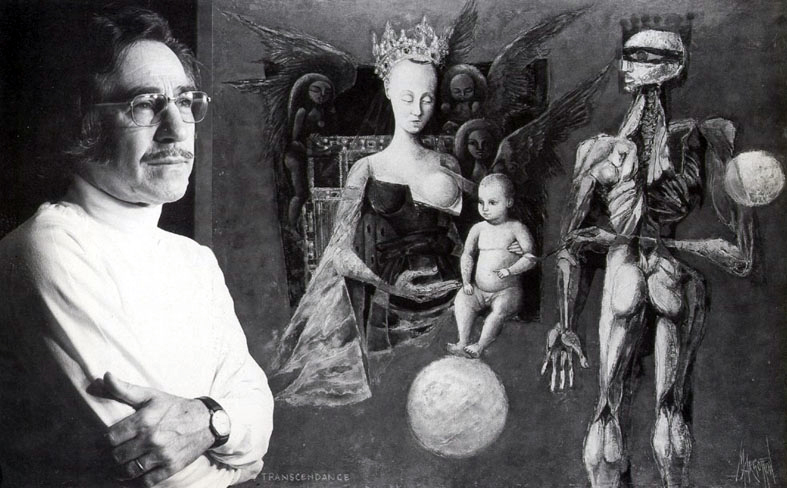
René-Margotton in his studio in Paris

René Margotton (1915 – 2009) was a French painter of the School of Paris, one of the last cubists of the 20th century. He was born in Roanne, France, in 1915, and died in 2009. He is also the father of Bernard Romain

== Biography ==
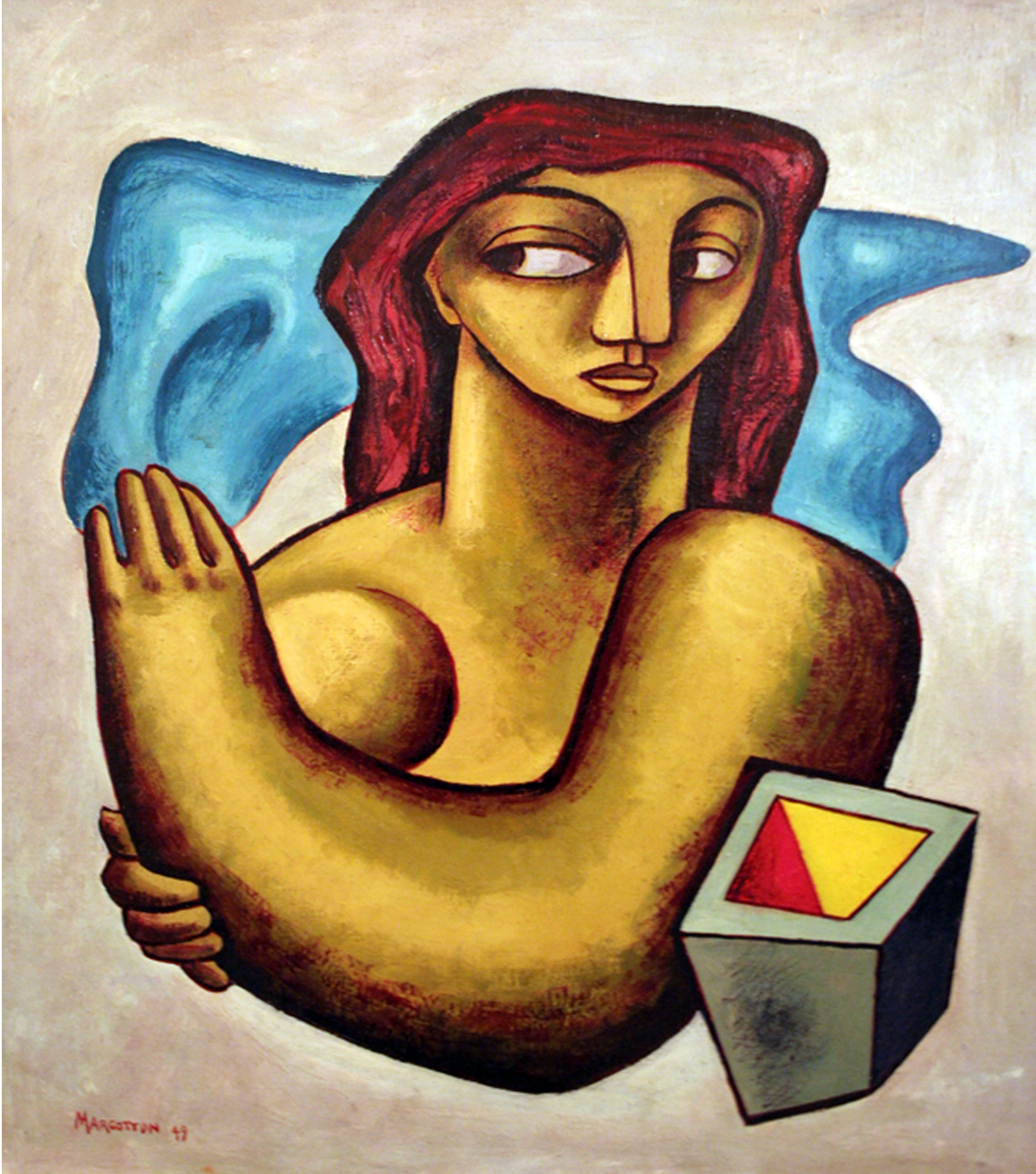
L'annonciation 1949 65x54 cm

He studied at the École nationale supérieure des beaux-arts of Paris and later with Fernand Léger

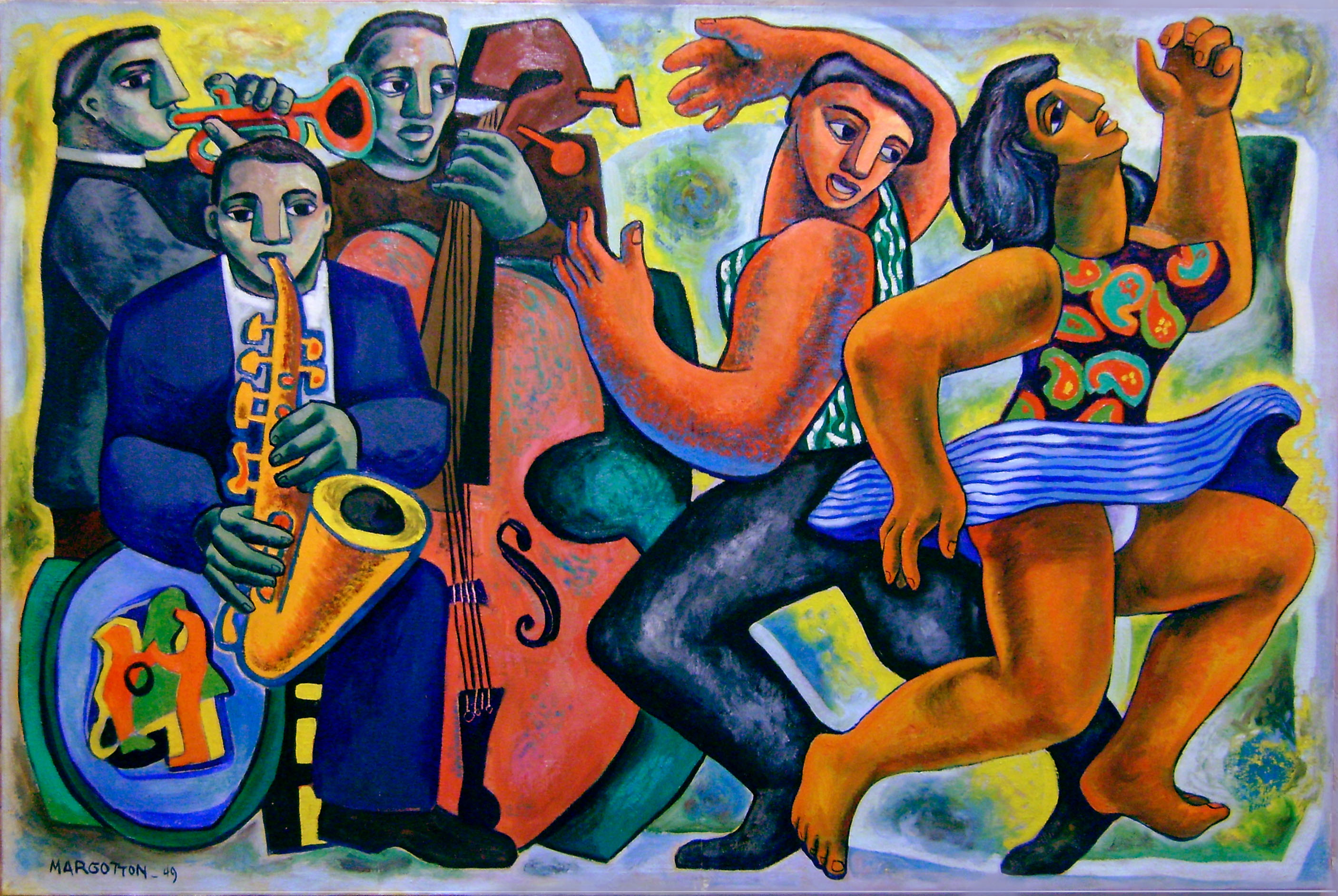
Be-bop 1949 97X146

friend of Maurice Utrillo and Bernard Buffet. He has exhibited extensively in Paris at the Salon de l'Art Libre, Salon des Independants, Salon de Printemps, Salon de l'Ecole Francaise, Salon de la Nationale des Beaux-Arts, and Salon "Les Grands et les Jeunes d'Aujourd' hui." He participated in a show of French Masters in Rome. He also exhibited with the French Young Painters in Geneva, Brussels, Finland, Germany, Canada, London, and Denmark. His first one-man show in America was held at Newman Galleries in 1965. He was awarded the Medal of Honor at the Marine Exhibition of Musée national de la Marine in 1959, the Grand Prix of the city of Sarreguemines in 1959, the Grand Prix of Marine Painting of the Museum of Narbonne in 1959, the Grand Prix of the Opal Coast in 1959, the Grand Prix of "Echo de la Finance," and the Grand Prix of the Palette Francaise.

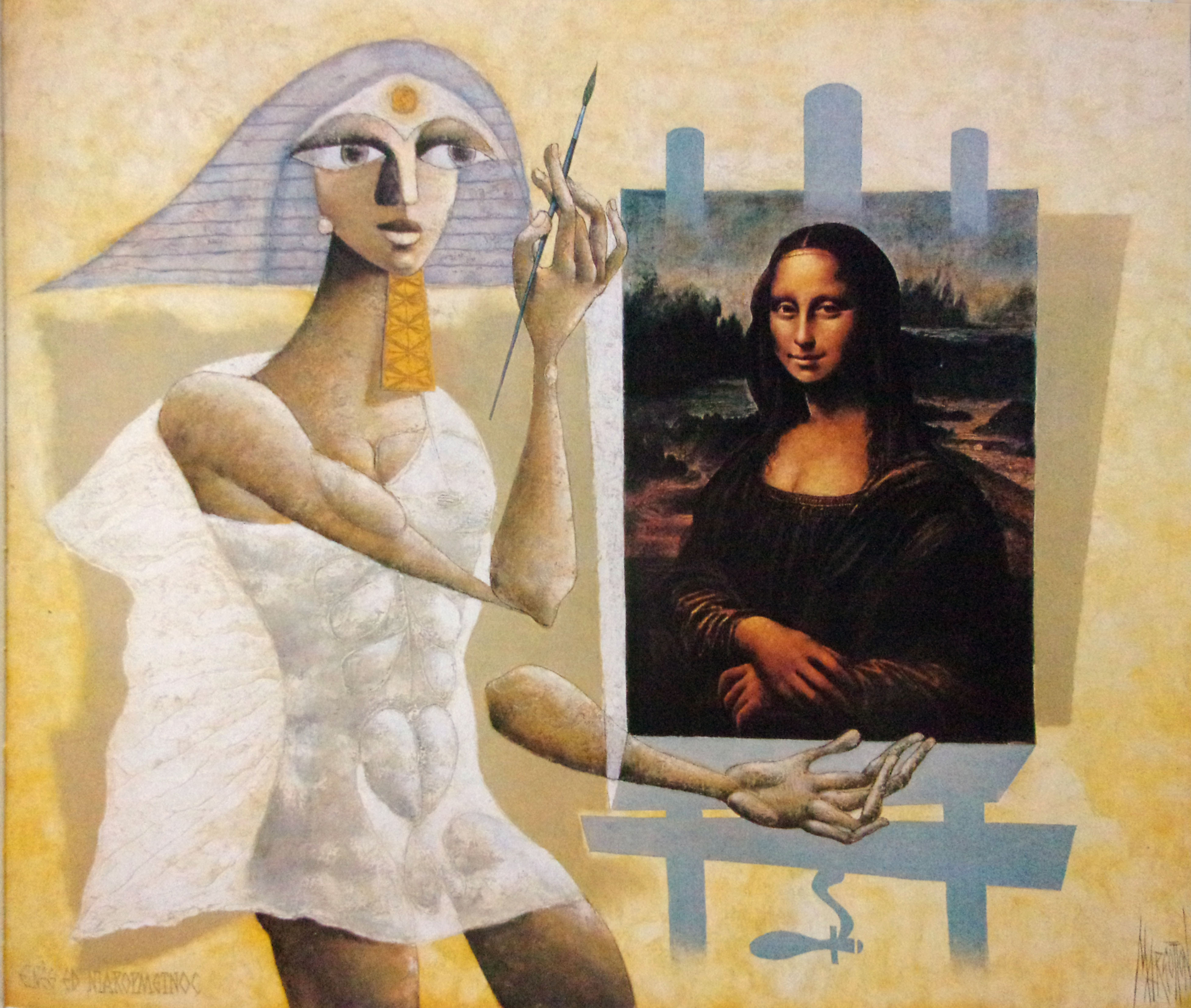
modern painter painting the Mona Lisa

His work is represented in the collections museum of the cities of Paris, Narbonne, Montpellier, and Sarreguemines. His paintings can be found in many prominent private collections throughout the United States and Europe, including that of the Swiss Consulate in Paris. The King of Cambodia purchased two paintings by Margotton for his country's Modern Museum.

He was awarded the Gemmail Prize (a Stained glass Art) in 1979 at the Religious art International Biennial and was named "painter of the light". Between 1989 and 1993 he created many stained glasses windows in France for Church of St. Martin in Valaurie, Basilica of Saint Martin, Tours, and Basilica of St. Pius X in Lourdes where 20 gemmails ("the way of light") will be made, on the appearances of Bernadette Soubirous

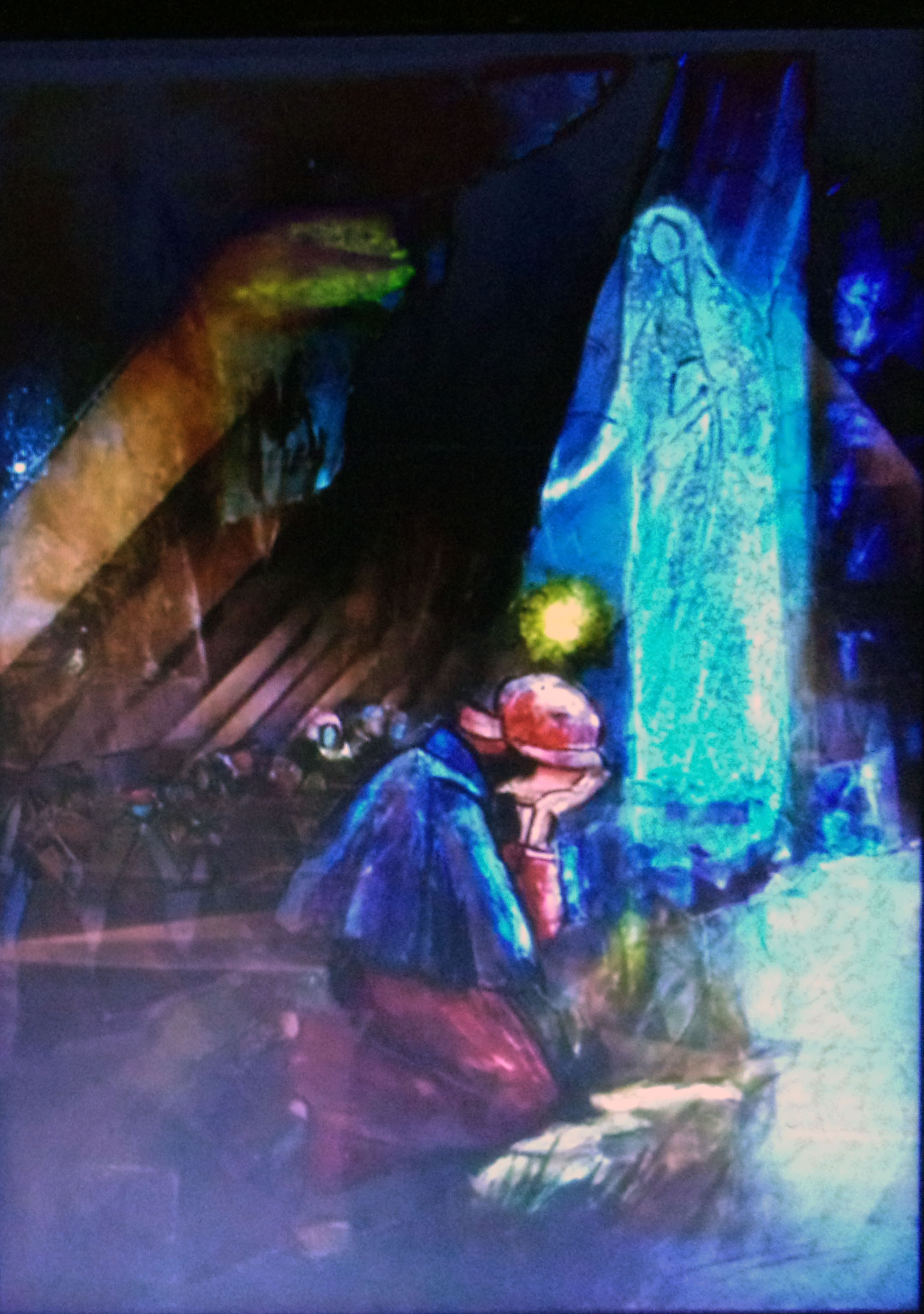
Lourdes Bernadette Gemmail

== Technique ==
Although Margotton used watercolors early on in his career, he later experimented with oils and continued to work almost exclusively in that medium. He often conceived his work according to the rigorous laws of composition, using an almost architectural foundation of solidly constructed volumes. Margotton's paintings, largely landscapes and figurative subjects, are simple and direct at first glance. A closer look, however, reveals his tendency to render the concrete abstract, and to formulate a symbolic, even metaphysical myth from that which is real and present. With powerful expression and vibrant color, Margotton combines a vigor and vitality which demonstrates not only his strong understanding of the relationship between form and color, but also his physical and spiritual expression of life and the visual world.

== Museum René Margotton ==
A mediaeval fort with embellishments dating from the 15th and 17th century, the entire construction a classified historical monument, the Bishops' Palace of Bourg-Saint-Andéol is one of the largest and most complex in the Vivarais region. Inside the museum René Margotton, the "Painter of Light"'s sacred works, displayed in a 19th-century neo-gothic chapel, and also in the "mystery" room. He was awarded a major international painting prize. As a whole, no fewer than 52 works are visible.
