= Wallanlagen =

Park in Germany

Coordinates: 50°07′07″N 8°40′52″E

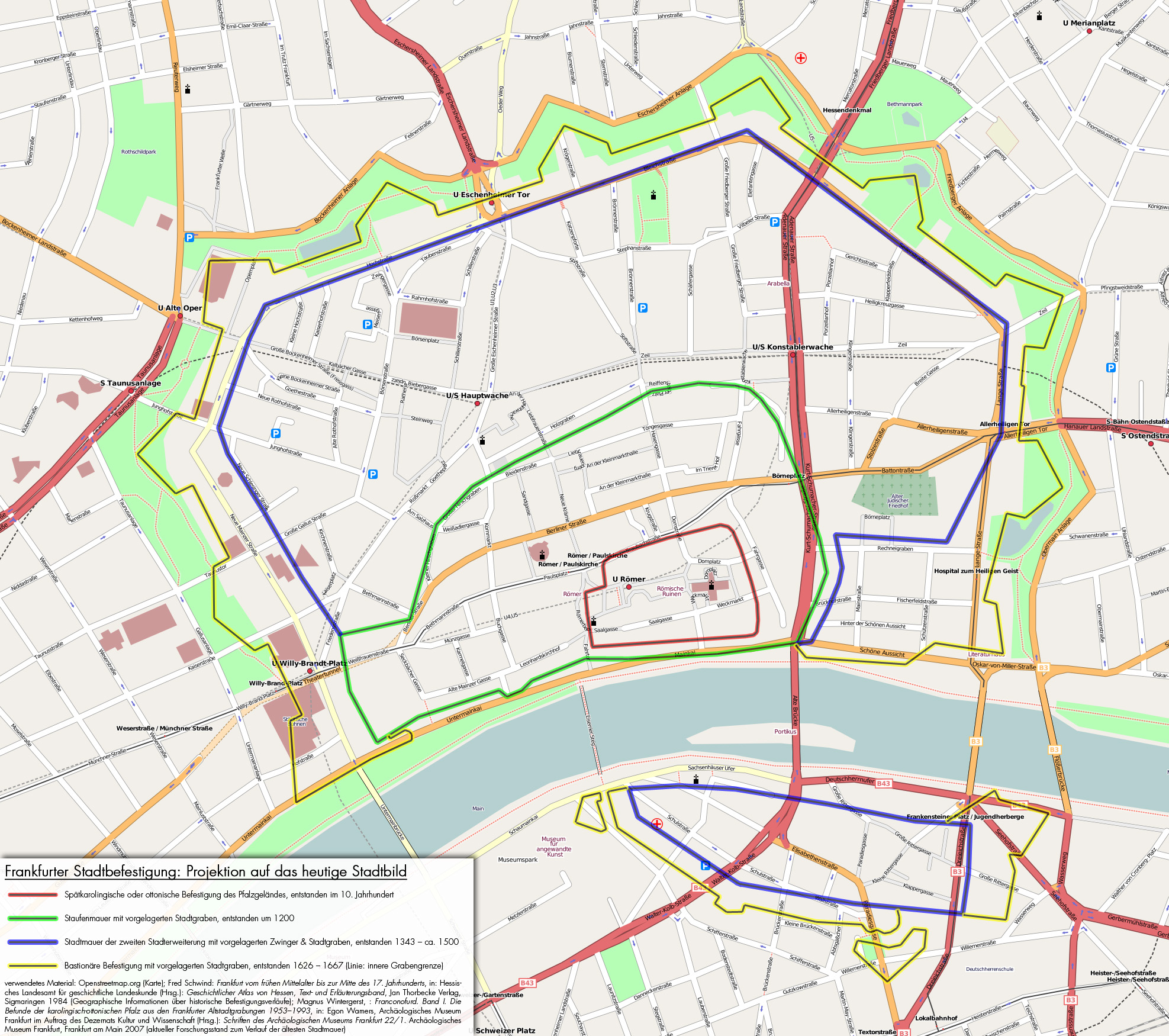
The Wallanlagen green belt and the course of the former city walls

The Wallanlagen (lit., "Wall Park") is a park area in Frankfurt, Germany, which forms a five-kilometre-long green belt around the city centre. The parklands run along the course of the former city walls, which were built from the 14th century and which were torn down in the early 19th century. The former course of the city wall was landscaped as a park between 1804 and 1812.

The Wallanlagen parklands are commonly divided into seven areas, which are usually named after the former city gates. They are the Untermainanlage, the Gallusanlage, the Taunusanlage, the Bockenheimer Anlage, the Eschenheimer Anlage, the Friedberger Anlage and the Obermainanlage.

== Gallery ==
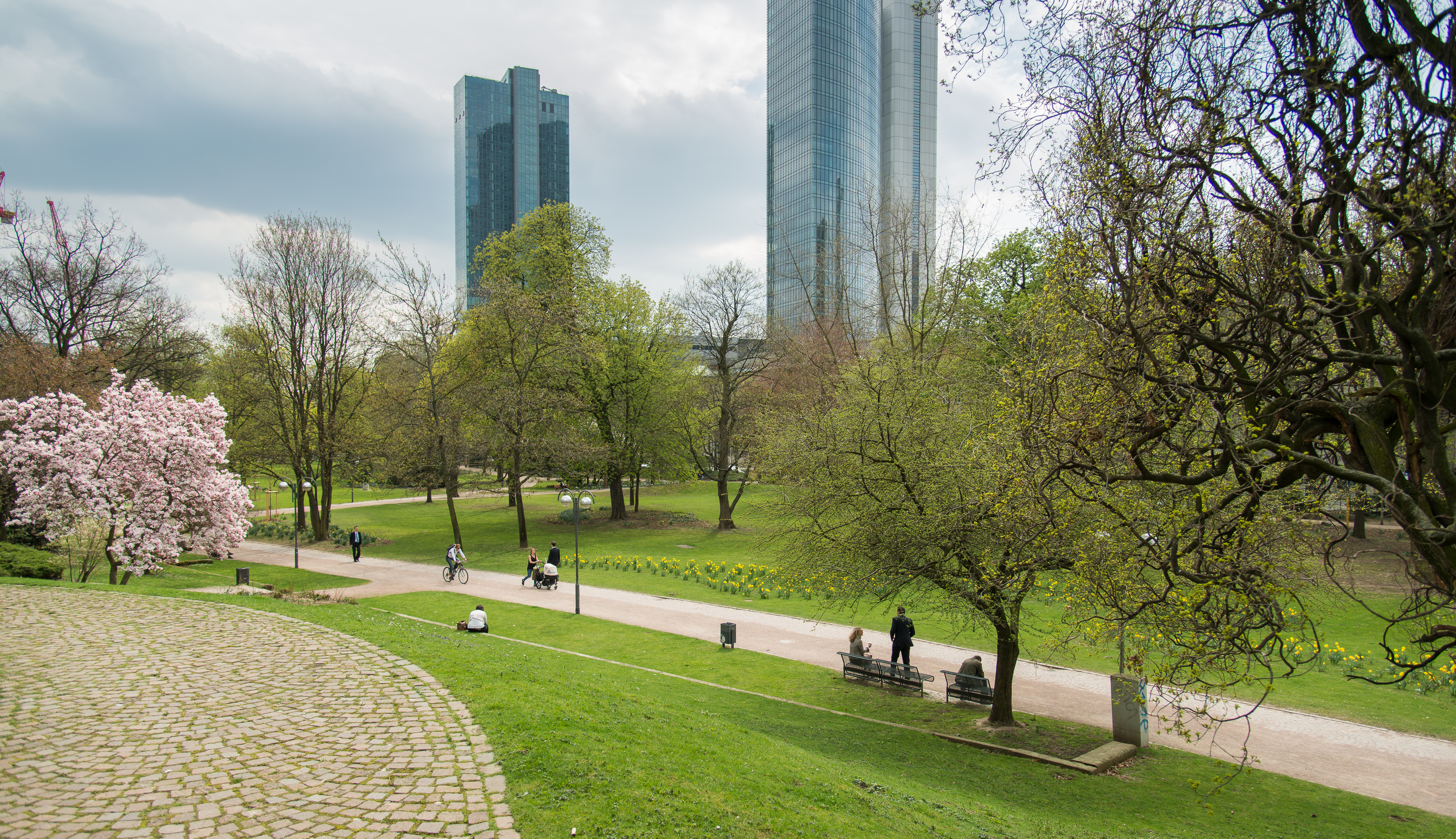
Taunusanlage

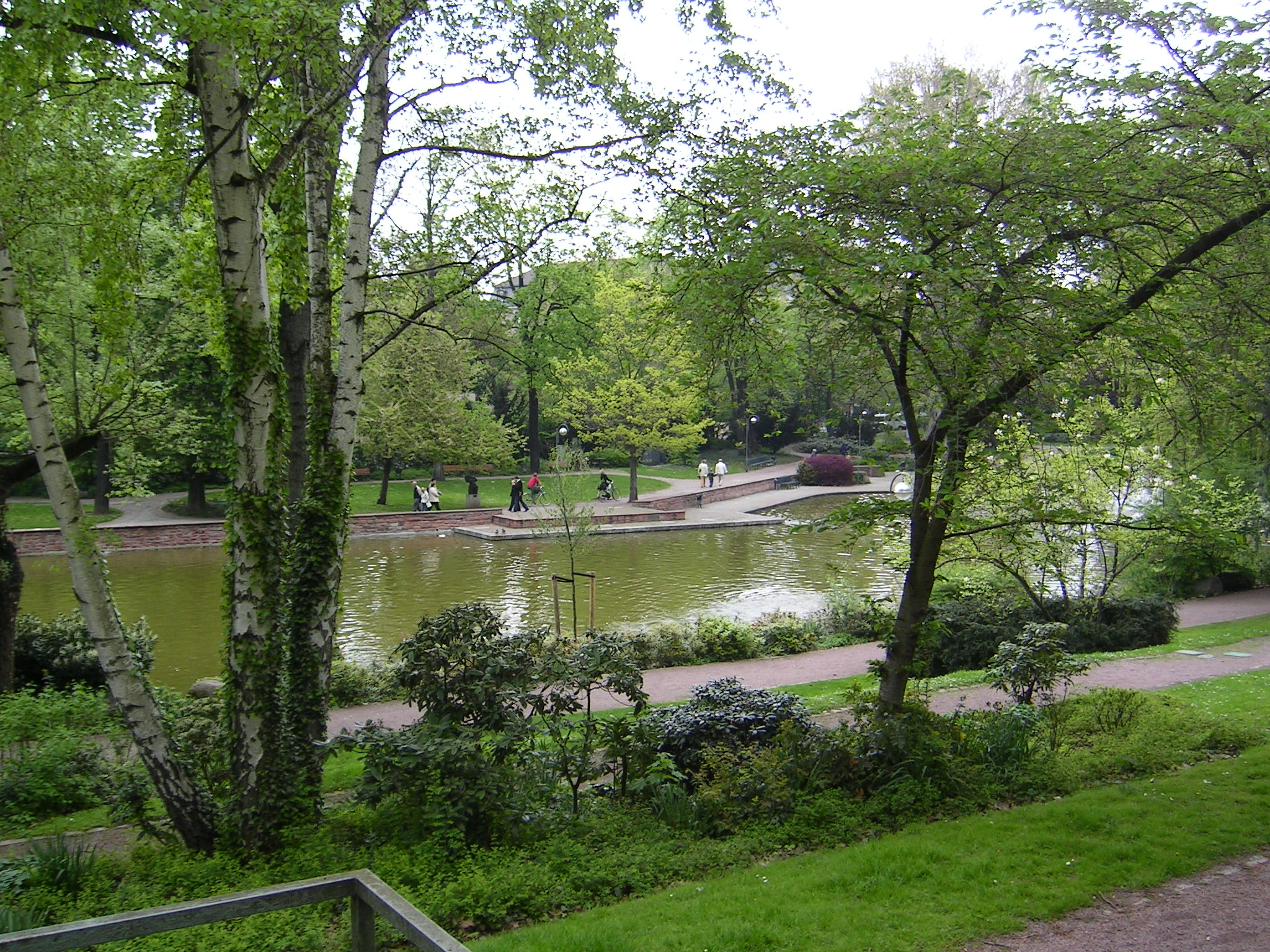
Bockenheimer Anlage

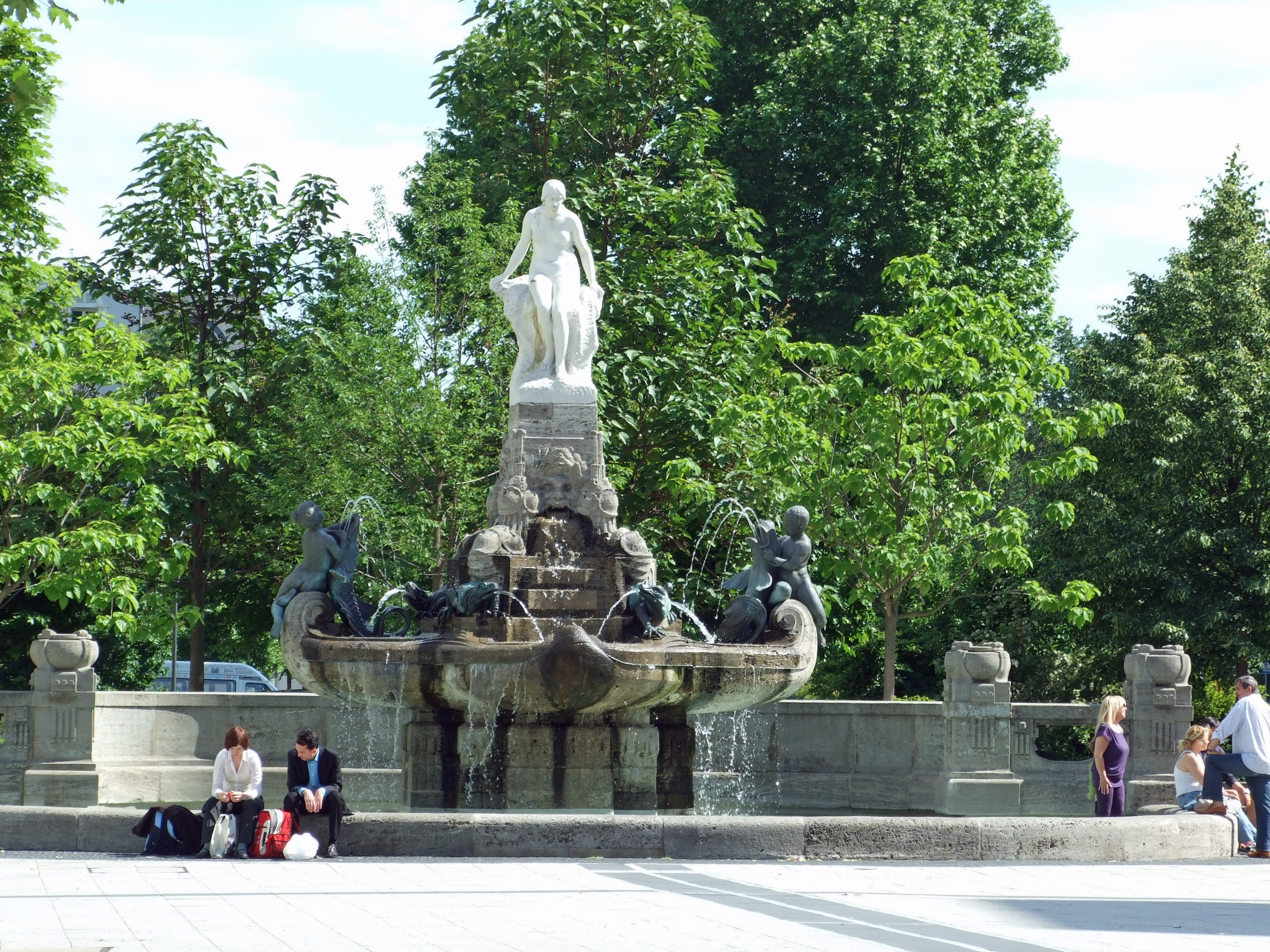
Märchenbrunnen ("Fairy Tale Fountain")

== See also ==
- Fairy Tale Fountain, Frankfurt
