= Ottmar Hörl =

German conceptual artist and sculptor

Coordinates: 47°46′32″N 9°34′10″E

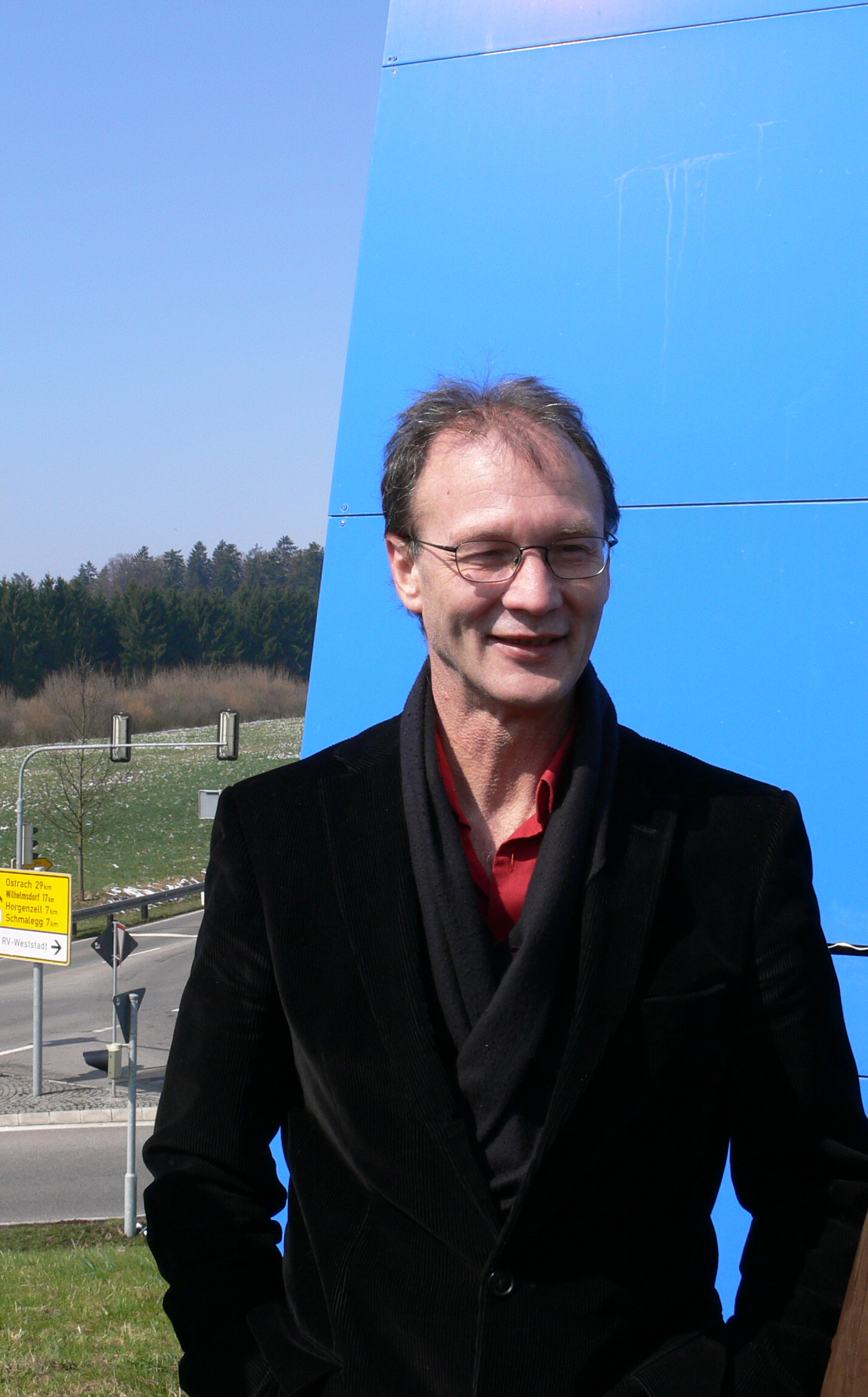
Ottmar Hörl

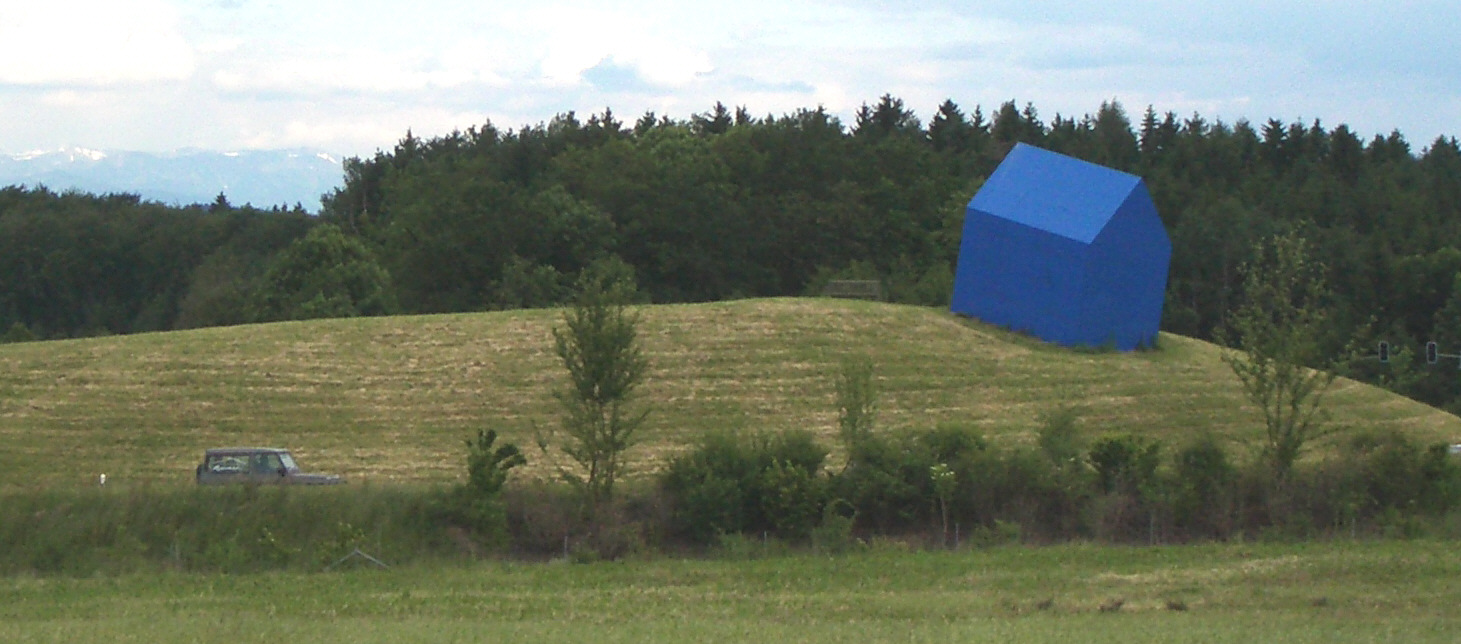
"The blue house" (2005)

Ottmar Hörl (born 1950 in Nauheim, Germany) is a German conceptual artist, sculptor, installation, action, photography, and object artist. He achieved worldwide popularity due to his radical, avant-garde art concepts as well as large-scale projects featuring serial sculptures in public spaces, based on his distinctive definition of sculpture as an organisational principle.

Hörl was described as an "offensive and direct strategist campaigning for a new type of public art" He is known for producing sculptures as multiples and in 2015 won the CREO prize.

His important contributions in the field of fine arts have earned him several awards, the latest of which, the CREO Innovation Award, was granted by the German Society for Creativity (Deutsche Gesellschaft für Kreativität e. V.) and presented to Hörl at the Goethe University in Frankfurt am Main in 2015. Since 1999, Hörl has held a chair as professor at the Academy of Fine Arts in Nuremberg, and has been the Academy's president since 2005. Moreover, he is a founding member of the group Formalhaut.

Ottmar Hörl lives and works in Wertheim, Frankfurt am Main and Nuremberg.

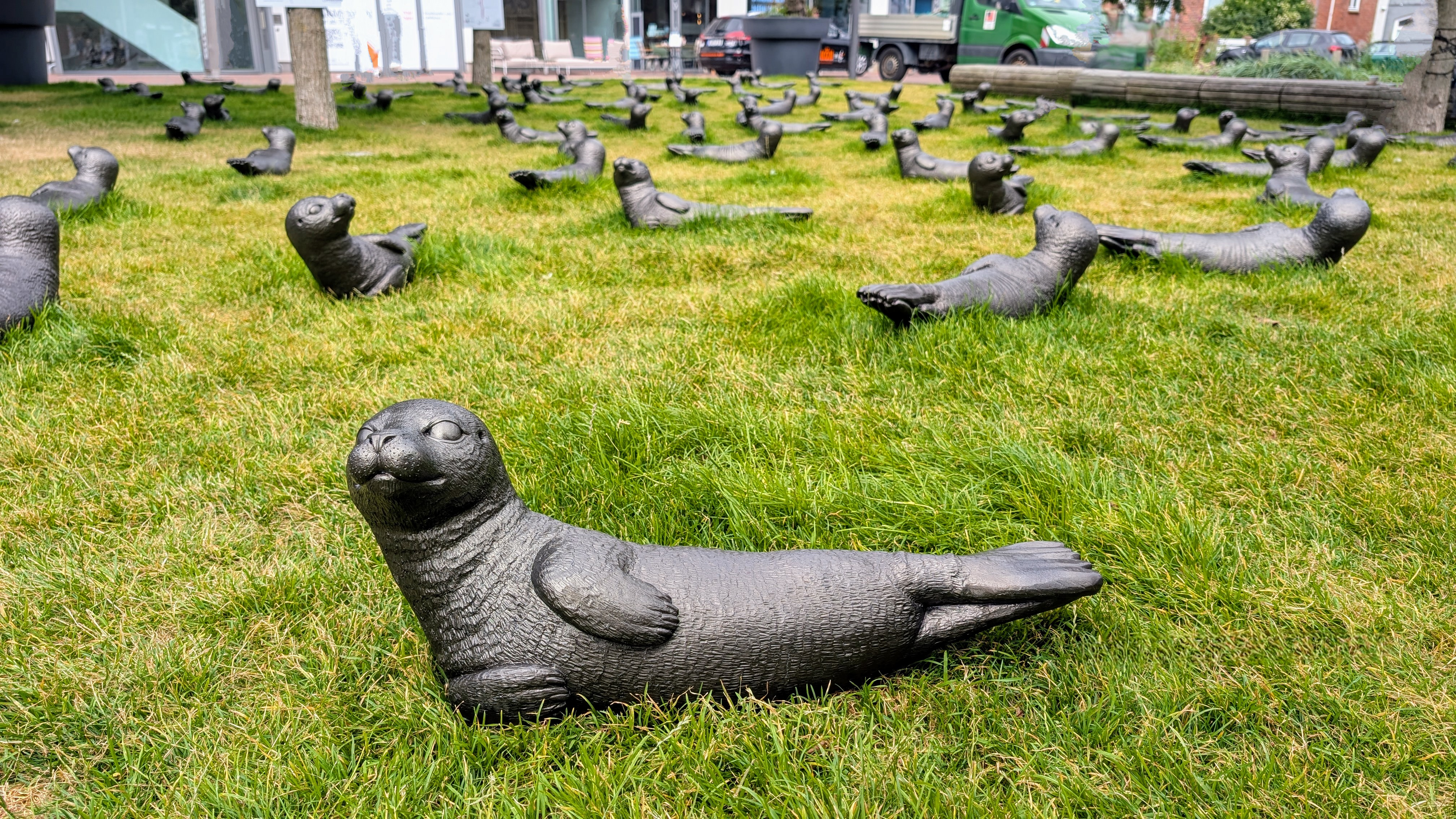
Ottmar Hörl 'Younsters' 2025

== Biography ==
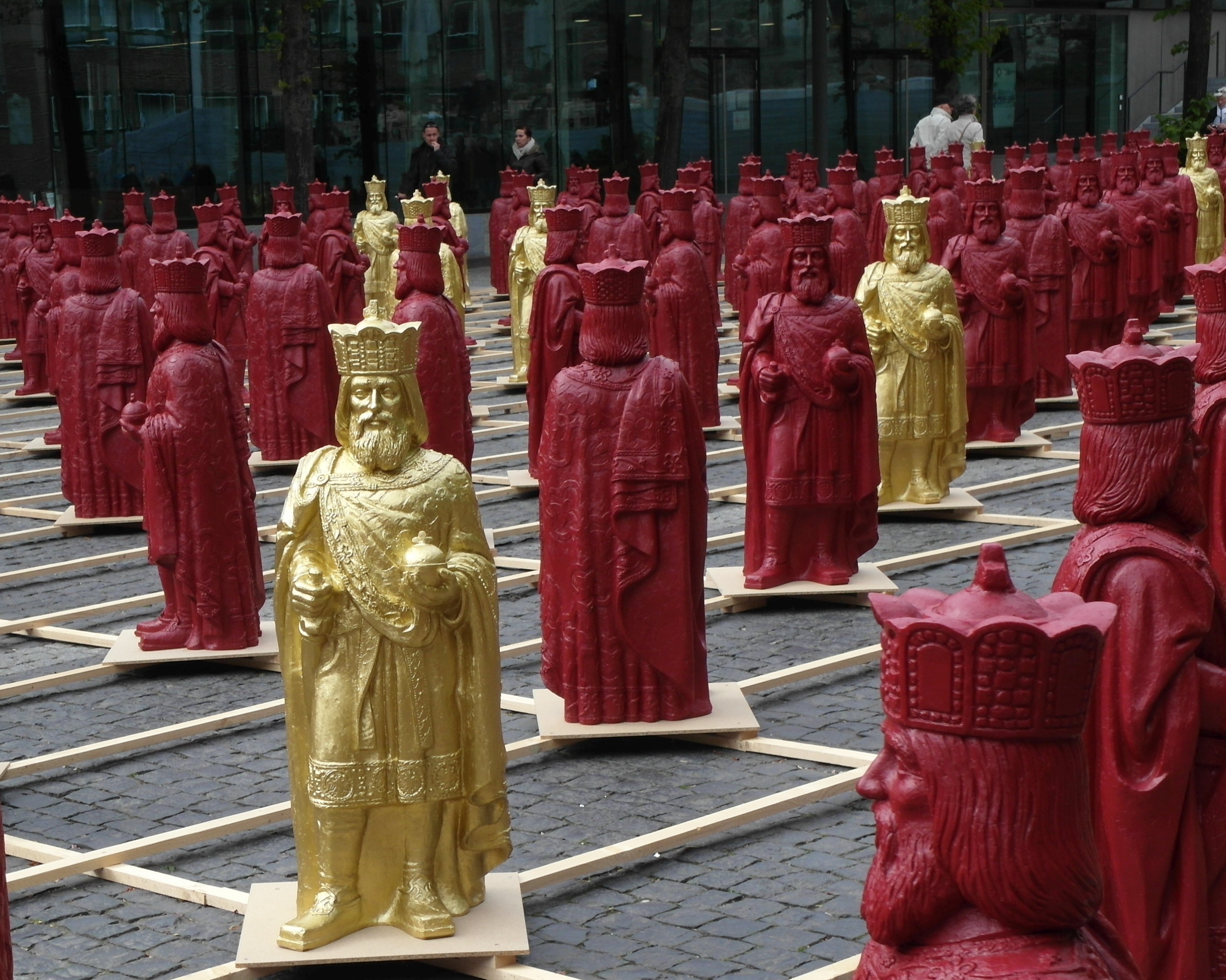
Art installation Mein Karl by Ottmar Hörl on the Katschhof place in Aachen, Germany

From 1975 to 1978 Ottmar Hörl studied at the Städelschule in Frankfurt, before changing to the Academy of Fine Arts at Düsseldorf he attended from 1978 to 1981. In 1985 he was a co-founder of the group Formalhaut, together with two architects, Gabriela Seifert and Götz Stöckmann.

In 1992/1993 Ottmar Hörl was a visiting professor at TU Graz. In 1999 he became a professor of fine arts at the Academy of Fine Arts in Nuremberg, Germany.

Since 2005 Ottmar Hörl is president of the Academy of Fine Arts Nuremberg.

== Outline of key characteristics and constant factors in Ottmar Hörl's oeuvre ==
Around the mid-1970s, Hörl started to use his works to explore questions of art intrinsic relevance as well as epistemological issues concerning the nature of sculpture, the inherent laws of art and its social significance and function, on the one hand, and the role of the artist, on the other. Based on his findings and the resultant implications, he has developed stringent artistic answers and strategies as well as his expanded, interdisciplinary definition of sculpture.

His quest for a reformation and extension of traditional approaches to sculptural creation is mirrored in both his use of industrial produce (e.g. garden gnomes, heavy-duty pallets, storage boxes, rubbish bins, plastic tubing) and his interdisciplinary collaborations with specialists from different fields such as architects and musicians. He has, for instance, worked with portrait photographers, professional athletes, pilots and sharp shooters, and invited a football team or everyone living in a particular town to collaborate.

One of his principal aims is to overcome a phenomenon still prevalent in art today, namely that of an artist attaining subjective fulfilment, leaving his personal mark and expressing his individual style; Hörl, by contrast, wishes to effectively implement the "absence of will as a notion of creative practice". Coupled with his respect for, and acceptance of, the integrity of inanimate objects and animate creatures, this decision represents the central motivation in Hörl's attitude as an artist. It is key to understanding his entire oeuvre. On the one hand, it sheds light on the communicative efficacy and momentum inherent in his works and striking a chord with many people, and on the other hand, it shows why his artistic position has the power to polarise opinion, especially in the art world.

== Awards ==
- 1994 Promotion Award for Architecture from the Academy of Arts, Berlin (with Formalhaut)
- 1997 Art Multiple Award, Düsseldorf
- 1998 Wilhelm-Loth-award, Darmstadt
- 2002 intermedium Award, along with Rainer Römer and Dietmar Wiesner (Ensemble Modern)
- 2015 CREO Innovation Award for Creativity, Frankfurt a. M./Mainz, German Society for Creativity (Deutsche Gesellschaft für Kreativität)

== Publications ==
- Formalhaut. Architektur, Skulptur, Verlag der Georg-Büchner-Buchhandlung, Darmstadt 1988, ISBN 3-925376-08-9
- Stoffwechsel. Das Buch zum Anzug, Häusser, Darmstadt 1990, ISBN 3-89552-066-7
- Materialprüfung, Städtische Galerie Altes Theater, Ravensburg 1996, ISBN 3-9804641-1-3
- Die Speisung der Fünftausend: Kunstprojekt "Fisch und Brot", Häusser, Darmstadt 1999, ISBN 3-89552-064-0
- Zeichnung. Klasse Ottmar Hörl, Text von Eva Schickler, Häusser, Darmstadt 2000, ISBN 3-89552-088-8
- Berlin-Bearlin. Skulptur: 10.000 Bären für Berlin, Häusser, Darmstadt 2000, ISBN 3-89552-074-8
- Traumhaus, Häusser, Darmstadt 2001, ISBN 3-89552-072-1
- Das grosse Hasenstück. The Great Piece of Hares, mit Beiträgen von Ruth Händler, Ralf Huwendiek, Thomas Knubben, Birgit Ruf, Eva Schickler u.a., Häusser, Darmstadt 2003, ISBN 3-89552-094-2
