= Zénith de Strasbourg =

Arena and concert hall in Eckbolsheim, France

Zénith Strasbourg Europe
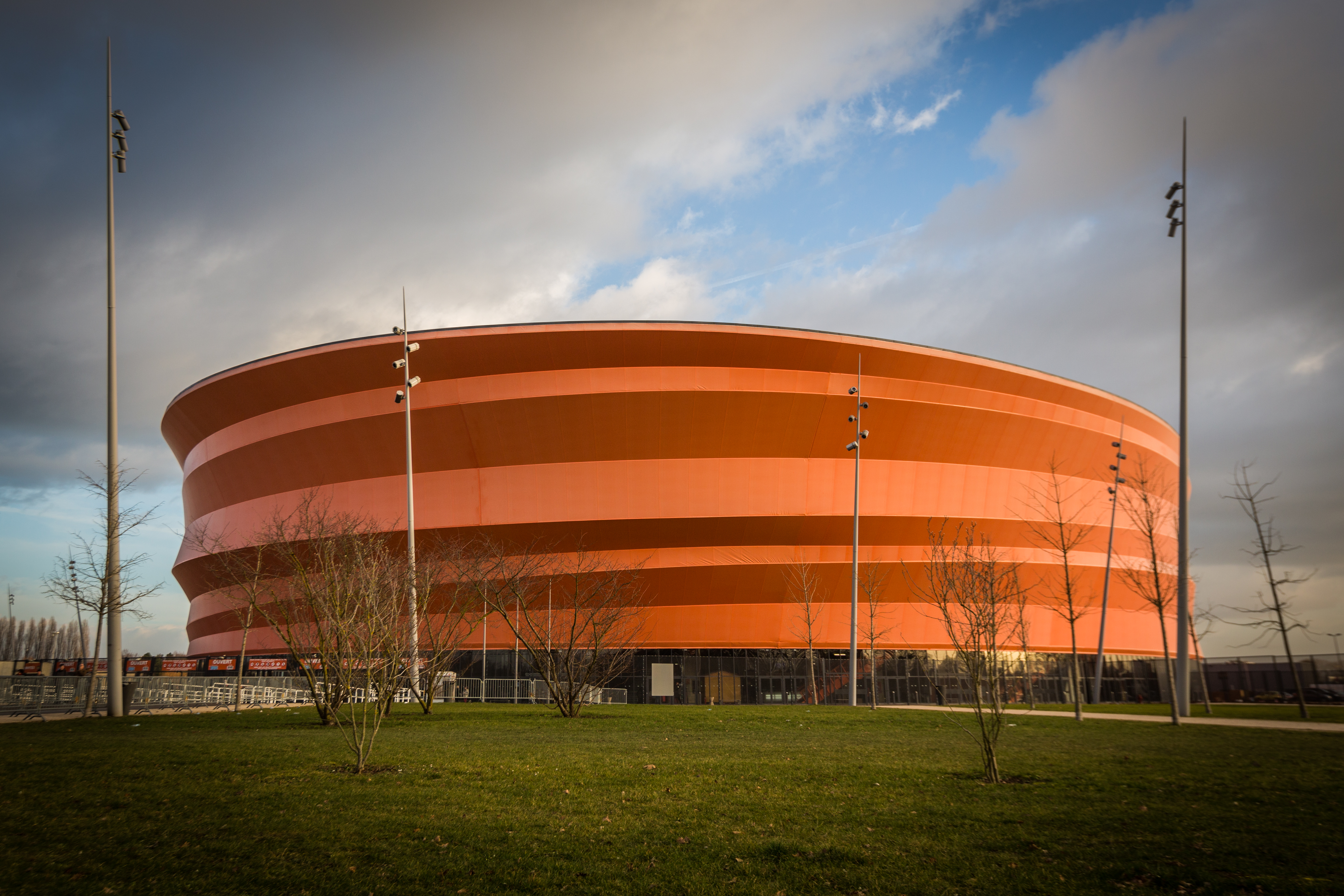
- Le Zénith de Strasbourg illuminé la nuit.
- Interactive map of Zénith Strasbourg Europe
- Location: Eckbolsheim, Bas-Rhin, France
- Coordinates: 48°35′36″N 7°41′14″E
- Capacity: 12,079

Construction
- Opened: January 3, 2008
- Architects: Massimiliano Fuksas; style: Postmodern Expressionist

Zénith de Strasbourg is an indoor sporting arena and concert hall that is located in the city of Eckbolsheim, Bas-Rhin, next to Strasbourg in eastern France. Many international artists performed at the venue, as Beyoncé, Justin Bieber and Lady Gaga.

== Design ==
It was designed, in the Postmodern Expressionist style, by Italian architect Massimiliano Fuksas.

== Venue ==
The Zénith de Strasbourg arena has a capacity of 12,079. Thus, making it the biggest Zénith in France. It opened in 2008, one of the Le Zénith series of similar venues throughout France.

== See also ==
- List of indoor arenas in France
