= San Paolo Apostolo, Foligno =

Church in Umbria, Italy

San Paolo Apostolo
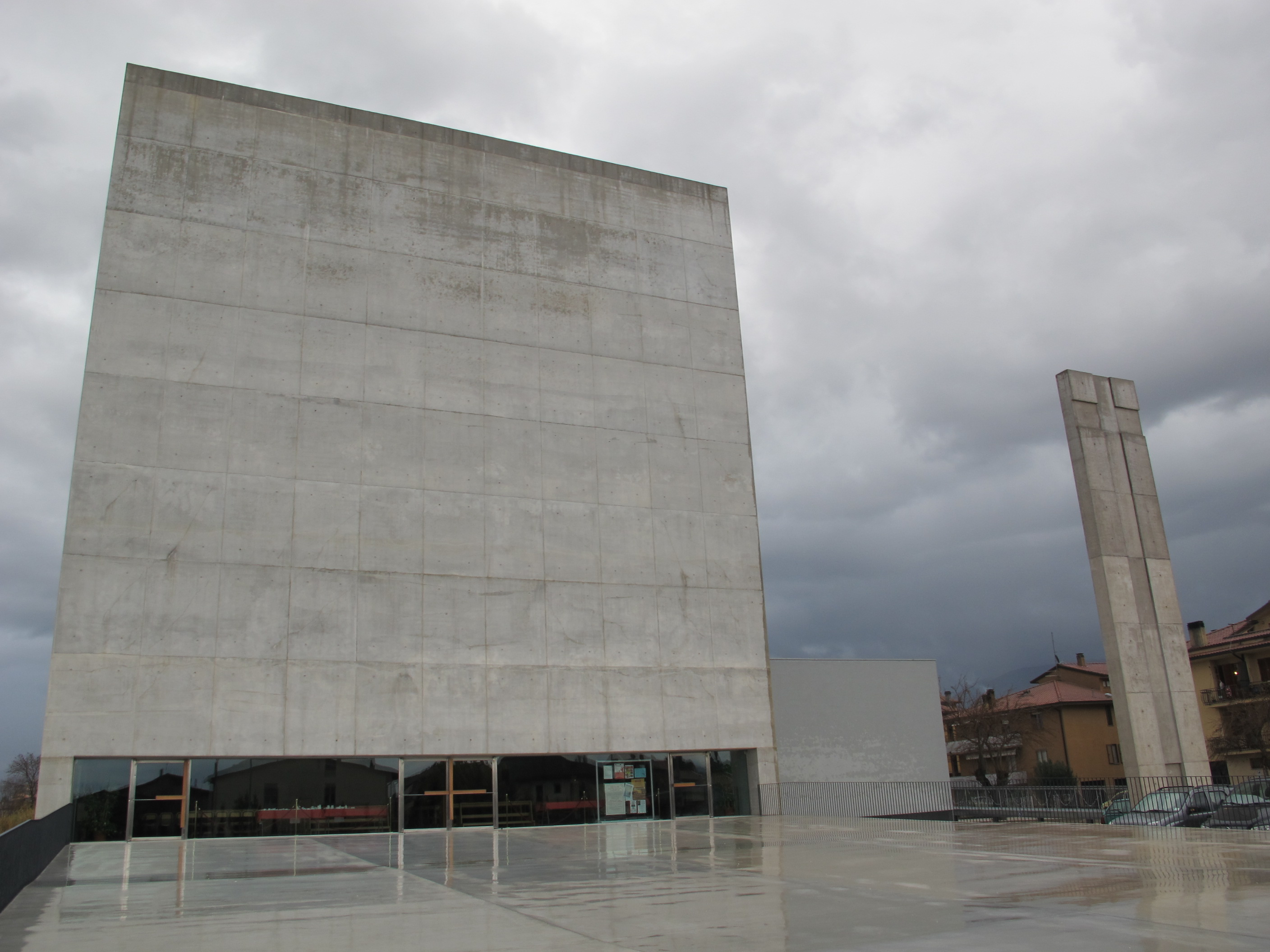
- The facade of San Paolo Apostolo in Foligno
- San Paolo Apostolo
- 42.9562321°N 12.6863069°E
- Country: Italy
- Denomination: Roman catholic

Architecture
- Architect(s): Massimiliano Fuksas and Doriana Mandrelli Fuksas
- Groundbreaking: 2001
- Completed: 2009

Specifications
- Materials: reinforced concrete

The church of San Paolo Apostolo in Foligno is a parish church designed by Massimiliano Fuksas and Doriana Mandrelli Fuksas in 2009. A symbol of rebirth after the Umbria-Marche earthquakes of 1997, it occupies a place where a temporary housing for displaced residents once sat.

The religious building was commissioned by the Italian Episcopal Conference (CEI) after the earthquakes of the late 1990s. Fuksas was assigned to the project after winning a competition that was announced in 2001.

== Architecture ==
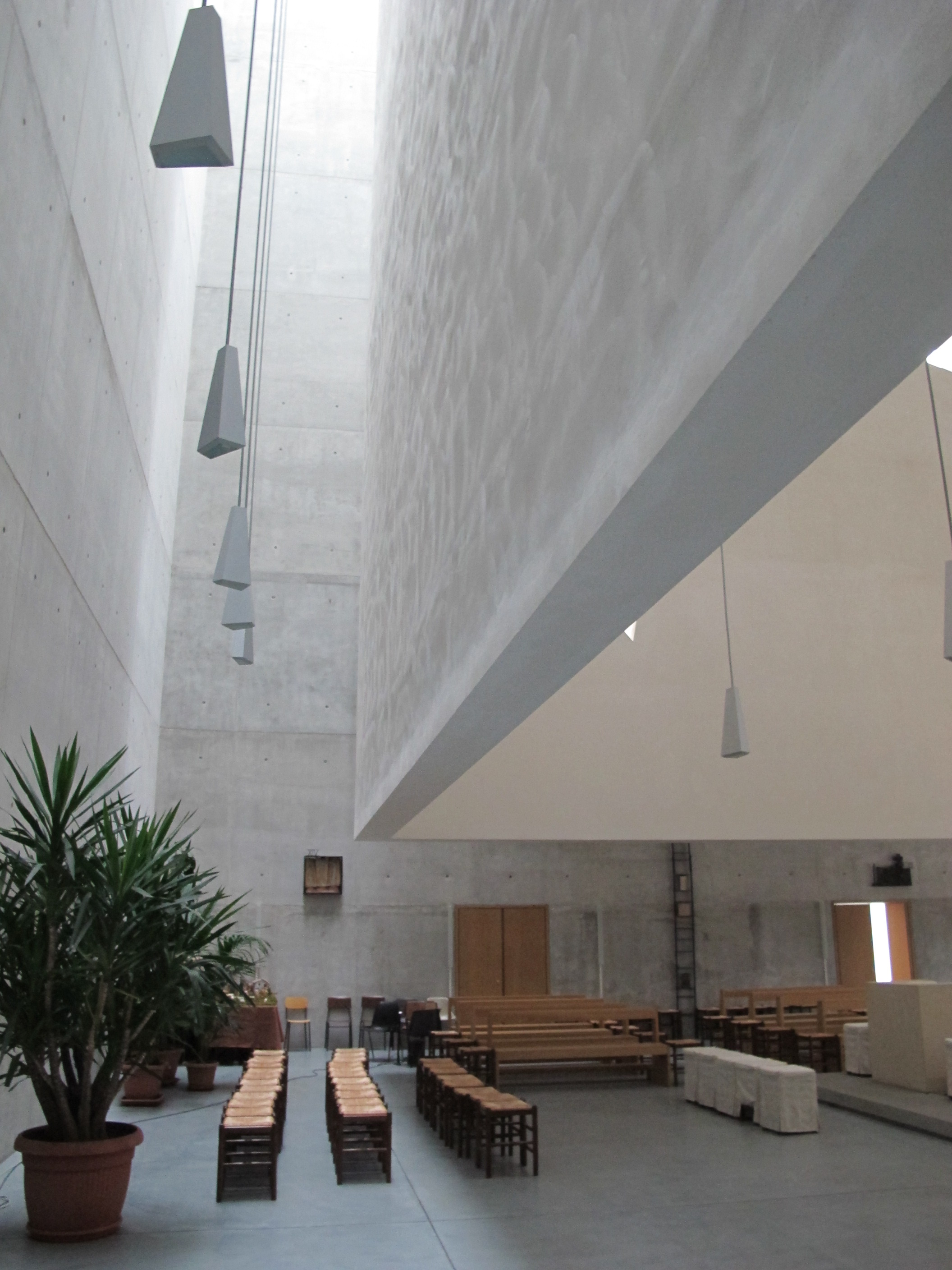
Inside view, where both the internal and external boxes, one inside the other, are visible

The building is chiefly composed of reinforced concrete, as a box within a box; the external section is 22,50m wide, 30m long, and 26m high; while the internal one is three meters above the floor and three meters from the external walls. Light enters through irregular windows found in the outside walls and through the roof. Though the church appears to be a monolithic block of cement, it was actually made using a structure of beams made of concrete with an internal and external liner of self-compacting cement 10 cm thick. Outside light enters from either the top or the bottom of the church. Chandeliers hang from the ceiling, and the presbytery and altar are placed in the center of the interiore space. The architect was inspired by Le Corbusier's Notre Dame du Haut in particolare as well as Gio Ponti's Villa Nemazee in Teheran. Mimmo Paladino created the 14 Stations of the Cross for the church.

== Criticism ==
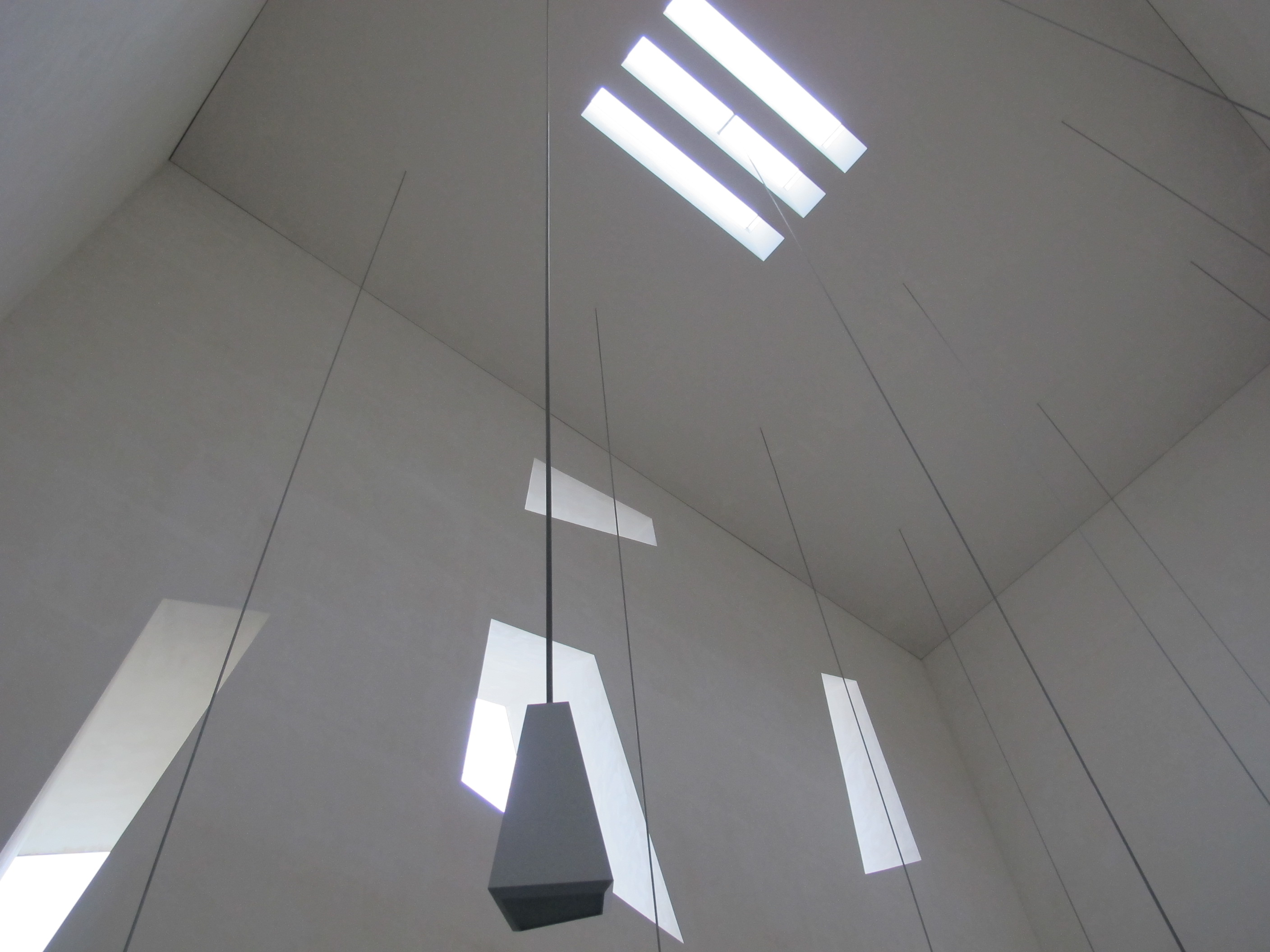
Detail of the lamps that hang from the ceiling and the irregularly formed windows.

Even though it was the Italian Episcolap Conference that chose Fuksas' design for its innovative character, the architect received some severe criticism. Vittorio Sgarbi, for example, maintained that the building does not fit in with its surroundings and therefore sticks out too much (this was, however, the intent of the architect), and seems more like a shoebox than a sacred space.

== Bibliography ==
- Faresin, Anna (2012). Architettura in calcestruzzo. Soluzioni innovative e sostenibilità. ISBN 978-88-598-0746-9.
