= Massimiliano Fuksas =

Italian architect (born 1944)

Massimiliano Fuksas OMRI
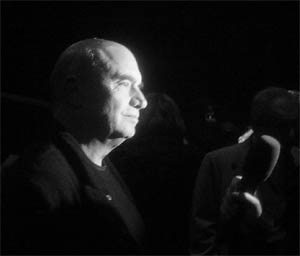
- Massimiliano Fuksas
- Born: 9 January 1944 (age 82); Rome, Italy
- Occupation: Architect
- Awards: Honorary Fellowship of the American Institute of Architects; Honorary Fellowship of the Royal Institute of British Architects; Grand Prix d'Architecture Française; International Architecture Awards 2007
- Buildings: FieraMilano, New Exhibition Hall, Armani Store Fifth Avenue, Armani Ginza Tower, Centro Congressi Italia, Vienna Twin Tower, Zénith Music Hall, Shenzhen Bao'an International Airport, Peres Center for Peace

Massimiliano Fuksas (born 9 January 1944) is an Italian architect. He is the head of Studio Fuksas in partnership with his wife, Doriana Mandrelli Fuksas, with offices in Rome, Paris and Shenzhen.

== Biography ==
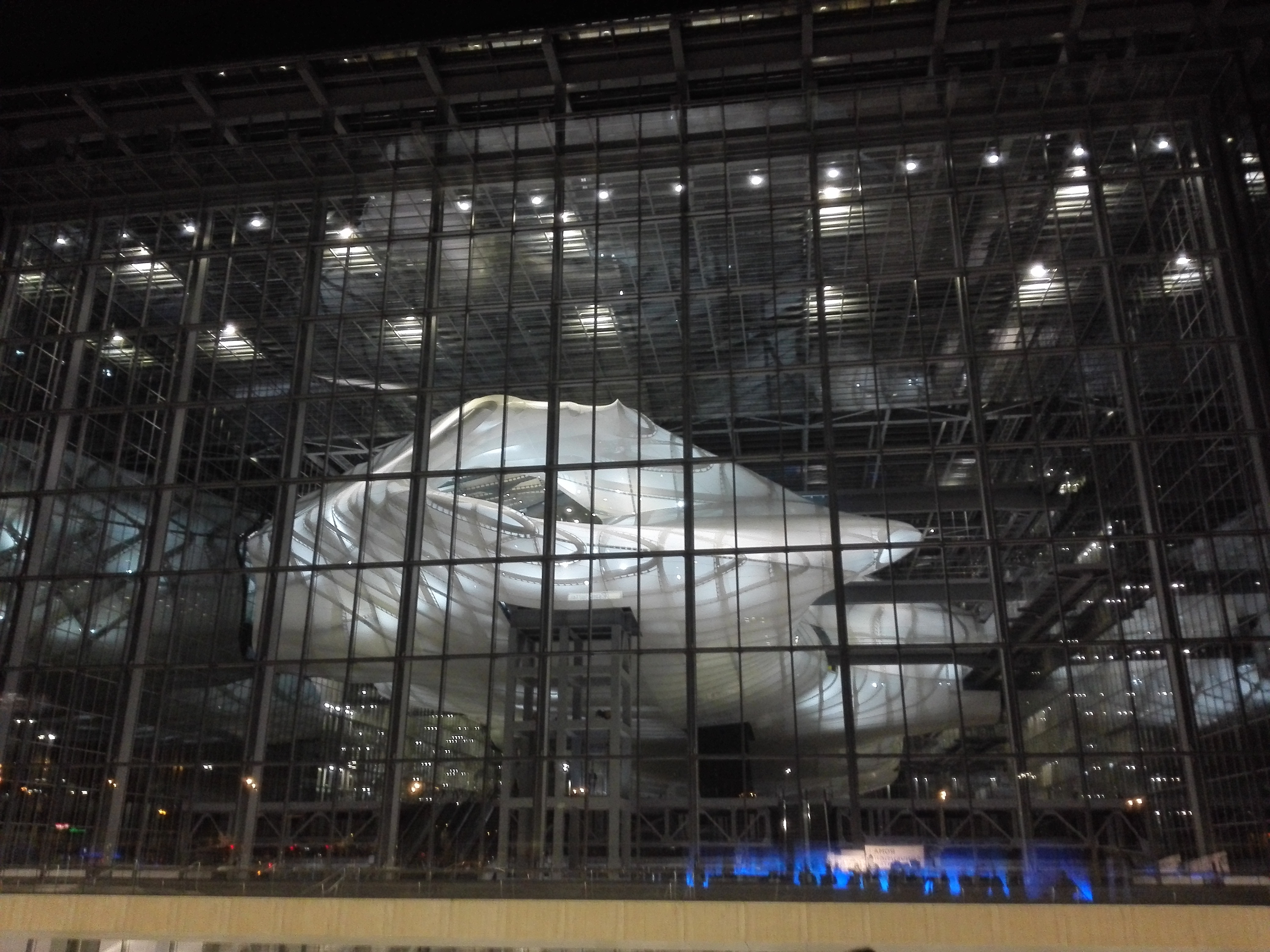
Rome Convention Center "La Nuvola"

Fuksas was born in Rome in 1944; his father was Lithuanian Jewish while his Catholic mother was the daughter of a French father and an Austrian mother.

At the beginning of the 1960s, he worked for Giorgio de Chirico in Rome. After he left Italy, he worked for a period for Archigram in London, for Henning Larsen and for Jørn Utzon in Copenhagen. He received his degree in architecture from the La Sapienza University in 1969 in Rome, where he opened his first office in 1967, the GRANMA, collaborating with his first-wife Anna Maria Sacconi.

From 1985 he has worked in partnership with his second wife, Doriana Mandrelli, who graduated in architecture in Paris in 2007. Subsequent offices were opened in Paris (1989) and Vienna (1993), Frankfurt (2002) and Shenzhen, China (2008). Shenzhen Bao'an International Airport's new Terminal 3, which his firm designed and built 2008-2013 (with parametric design support by the engineering firm Knippers Helbig), is an outstanding example for the use of parametric design and production technologies in a large scale building.

Fuksas had two daughters with Doriana Fuksas: Elisa and Lavinia.

From 1994 to 1997 he was a member of the urban commissions of Berlin and of Salzburg. For many years he has dedicated his special attention to the study of urban problems and in particular to the suburbs. From June 1997 he was advisor to the I.F.A. (Institut Français d'Architecture) Administration Board. Since January 2000, he writes the architecture column of the weekly publication L'Espresso, established by Bruno Zevi. In 2000 he was (somewhat ironically in light of his practice of employing unpaid interns for periods up to two years) the Director of The Venice Biennale's - 7th International Architecture Exhibition - "Less Aesthetics, More Ethics".

He is visiting professor at several universities, including the École spéciale d'architecture in Paris, and Columbia University in New York.

On 6 December 2021, Fuksas had his Lithuanian citizenship restored.

== Main works ==
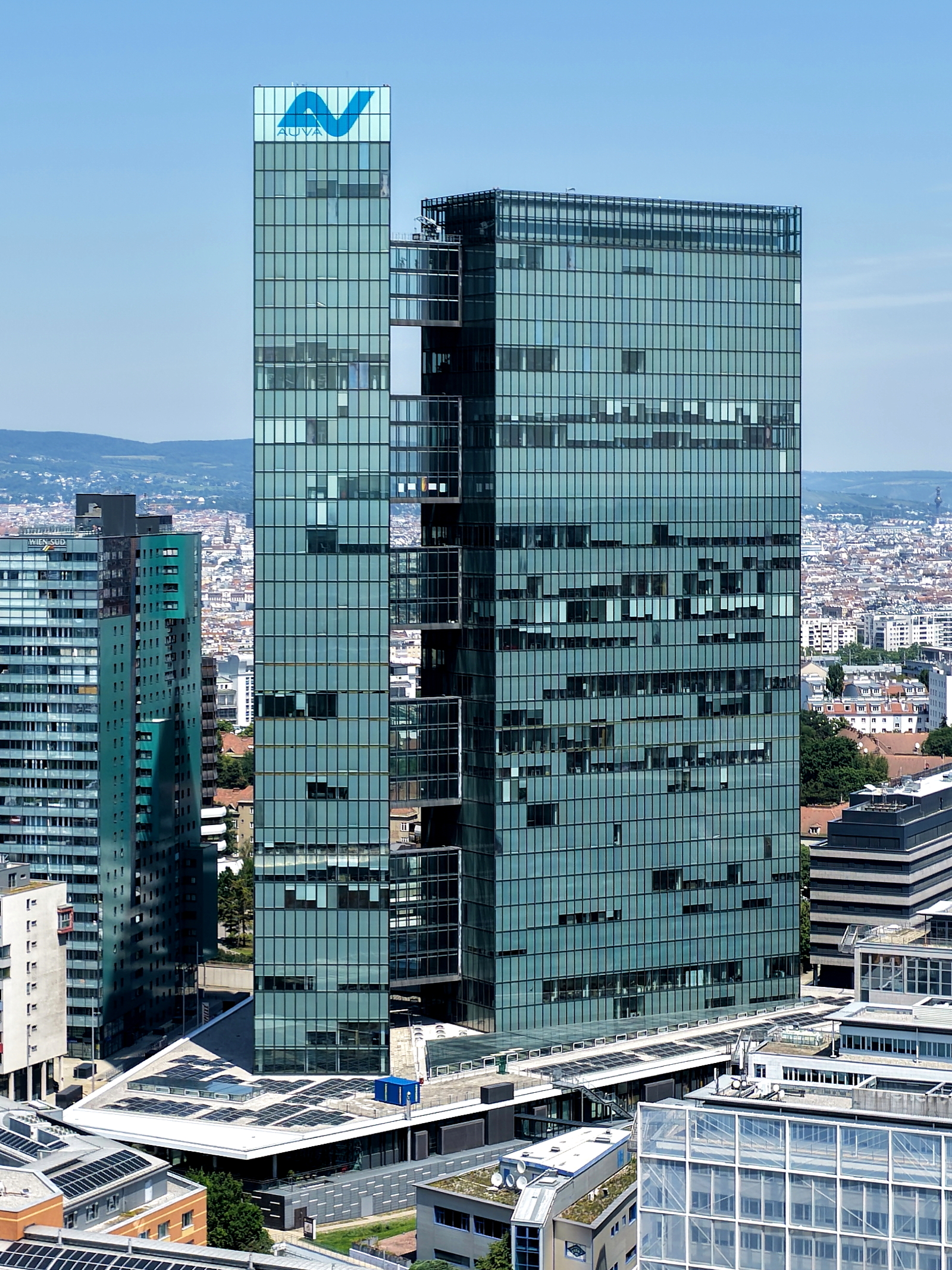
Twin Tower, Vienna

FieraMilano complex, Milan

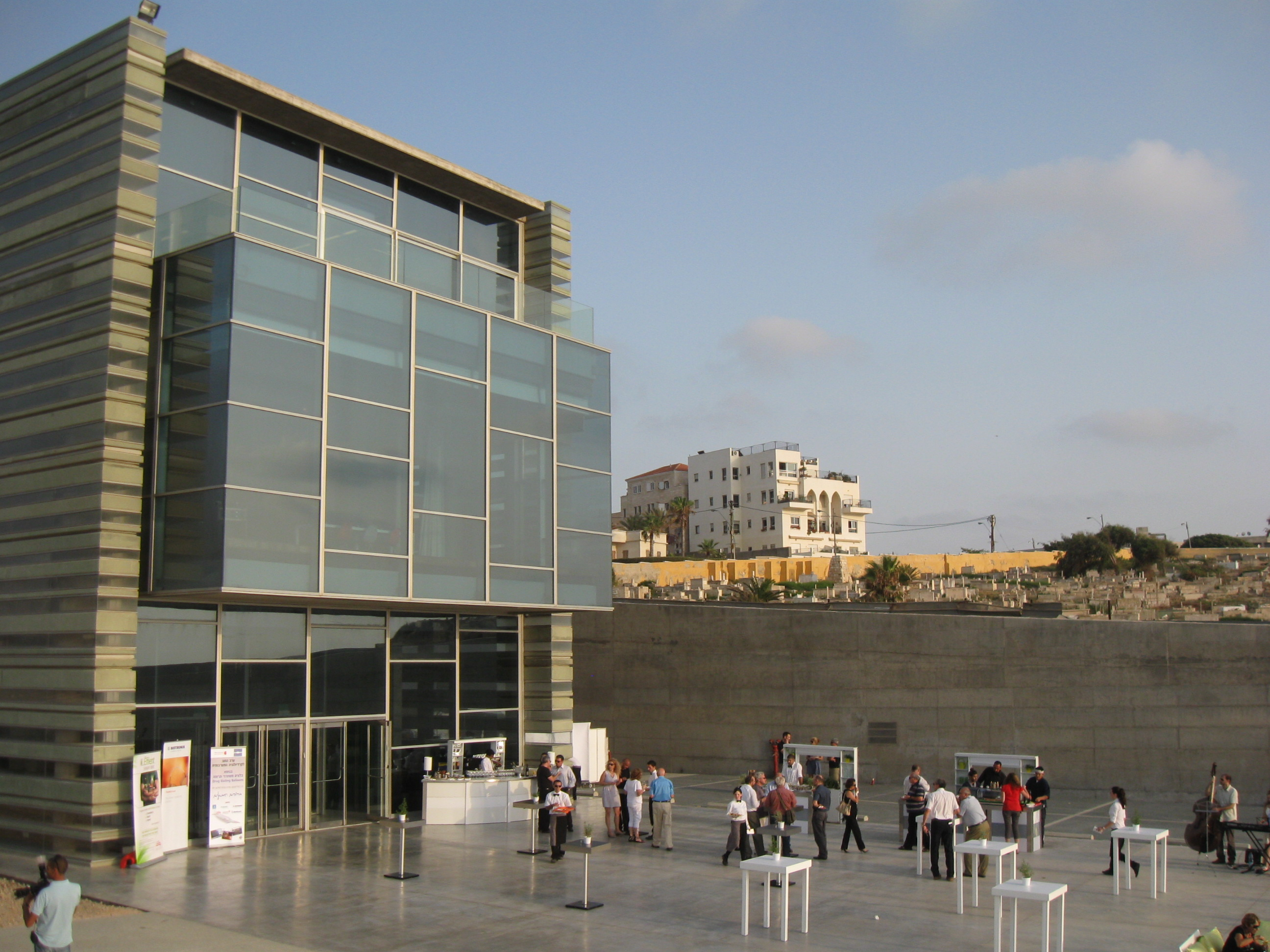
Peres Center for Peace, Ajami, Jaffa

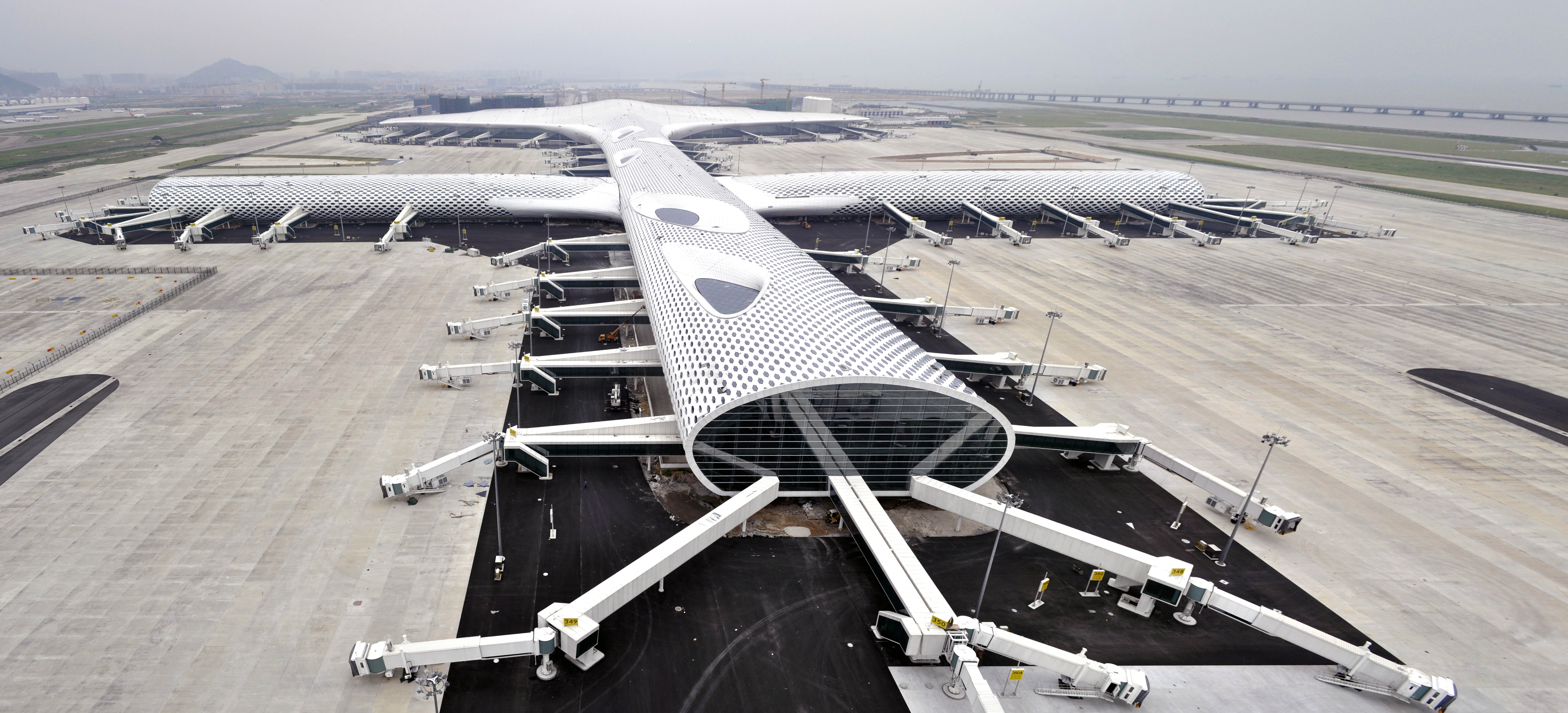
Shenzhen Bao'an International Airport

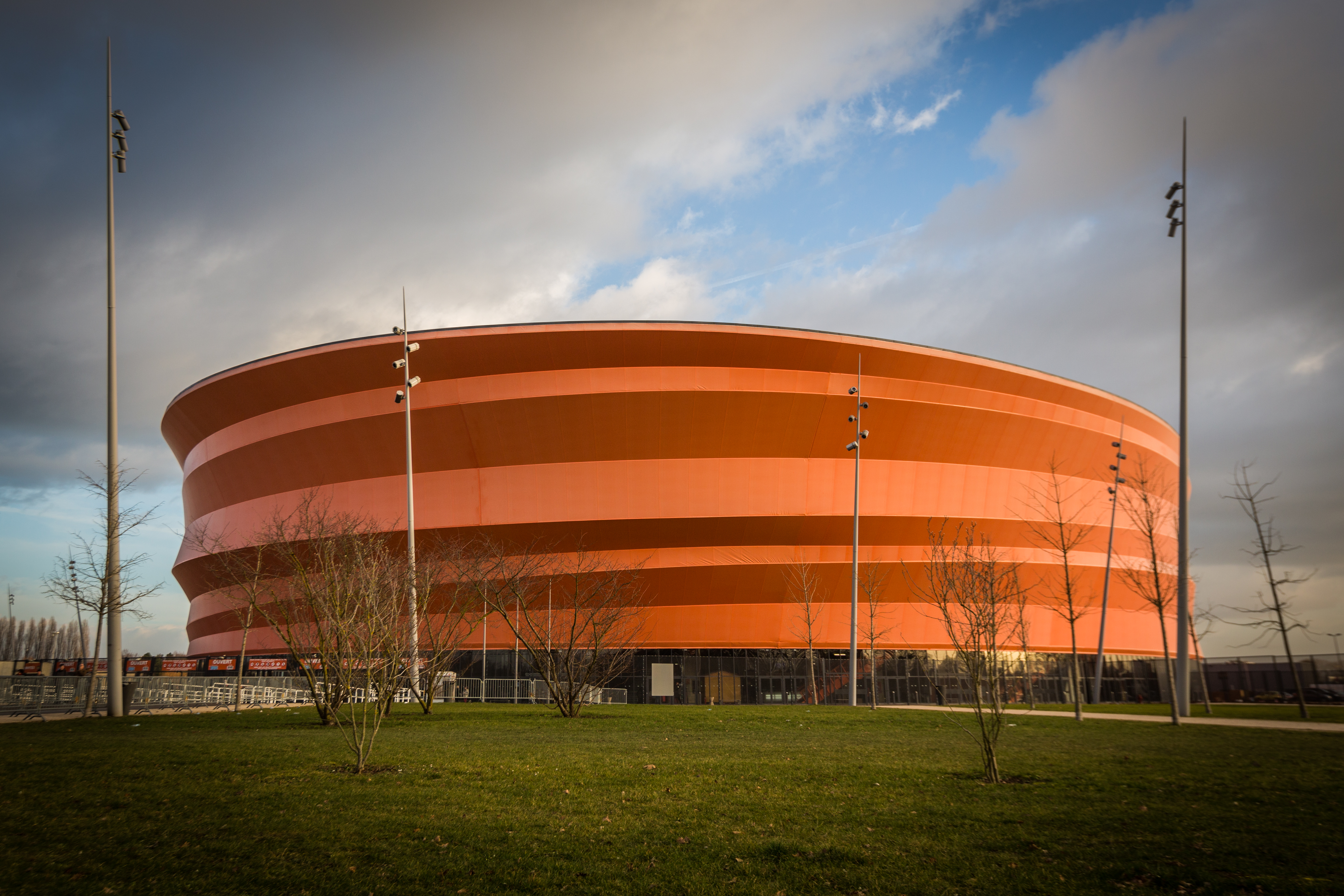
Zénith Music Hall, Strasbourg, France

- School at Anagni
- Gym at Paliano
- University at Brest and Limoges, France
- "Flora Tristan" University Complex, Hérouville-Saint-Clair, France
- Maison des Arts, Bordeaux, France
- Cave of Niaux visitor entrance, Ariège (department), France
- Shopping Mall Europark 1, Salzburg, Austria
- Vienna Twin Tower in Vienna, Austria
- PalaLottomatica Facade, Rome, Italy
- FieraMilano exhibition complex, Rho, Milan, Italy
- Centro Congressi Italia, EUR district, Rome
- Urban master plan FrankfurtHochVier in Frankfurt, Germany
- Nardini Auditorium and Research Centre, Bassano del Grappa, Italy
- Ferrari Headquarters and Research Centre, Maranello, Italy
- New Exhibition Hall, Porta Palazzo district, Turin, Italy
- Armani Ginza Tower, Tokyo, Japan
- Armani Fifth Avenue, New York City, US
- De Cecco Headquarters, Pescara, Italy
- Zénith Music Hall, Strasbourg, France
- St. Paul Apostle's Church (Chiesa di San Paolo Apostolo), Foligno, Italy
- Peres Center for Peace, Ajami, Jaffa, Israel
- French National Archives, Pierrefitte, France
- Shopping centre BLOB, Eindhoven, Netherlands
- Shenzhen Bao'an International Airport, in cooperation with Knippers Helbig, Shenzhen, China
- Tbilisi Service Centre, Tbilisi, Georgia

== Works in progress ==
- Piedmont Region Headquarters, Lingotto district, Turin
- House of Justice, Tbilisi, Georgia
- Australia Forum, Canberra, Australia
- Is Molas Golf Resort, Pula, Sardinia, Italy
- Beverly Center, Beverly Hills, US
- Bandra Versova Sealink, Mumbai, India

== Major awards ==
- 1998 Vitruvio a la Trayectoria, in Buenos Aires, Argentina
- 1999 Grand Prix d'Architecture Française
- 2000 Accademico Nazionale di San Luca, Italy
- 2000 Commandeur de l'Ordre des Arts et des Lettres de la République Française
- 2002 Honorary Fellowship of the American Institute of Architects
- 2006 Honorary Fellowship of the Royal Institute of British Architects, London
- 2009, Gold Medal for Italian Architecture, Triennale di Milano, Milano
- 2011 Ignazio Silone International Prize for Culture, Rome
