= Expo Axis =

Membrane roof in Shanghai, China

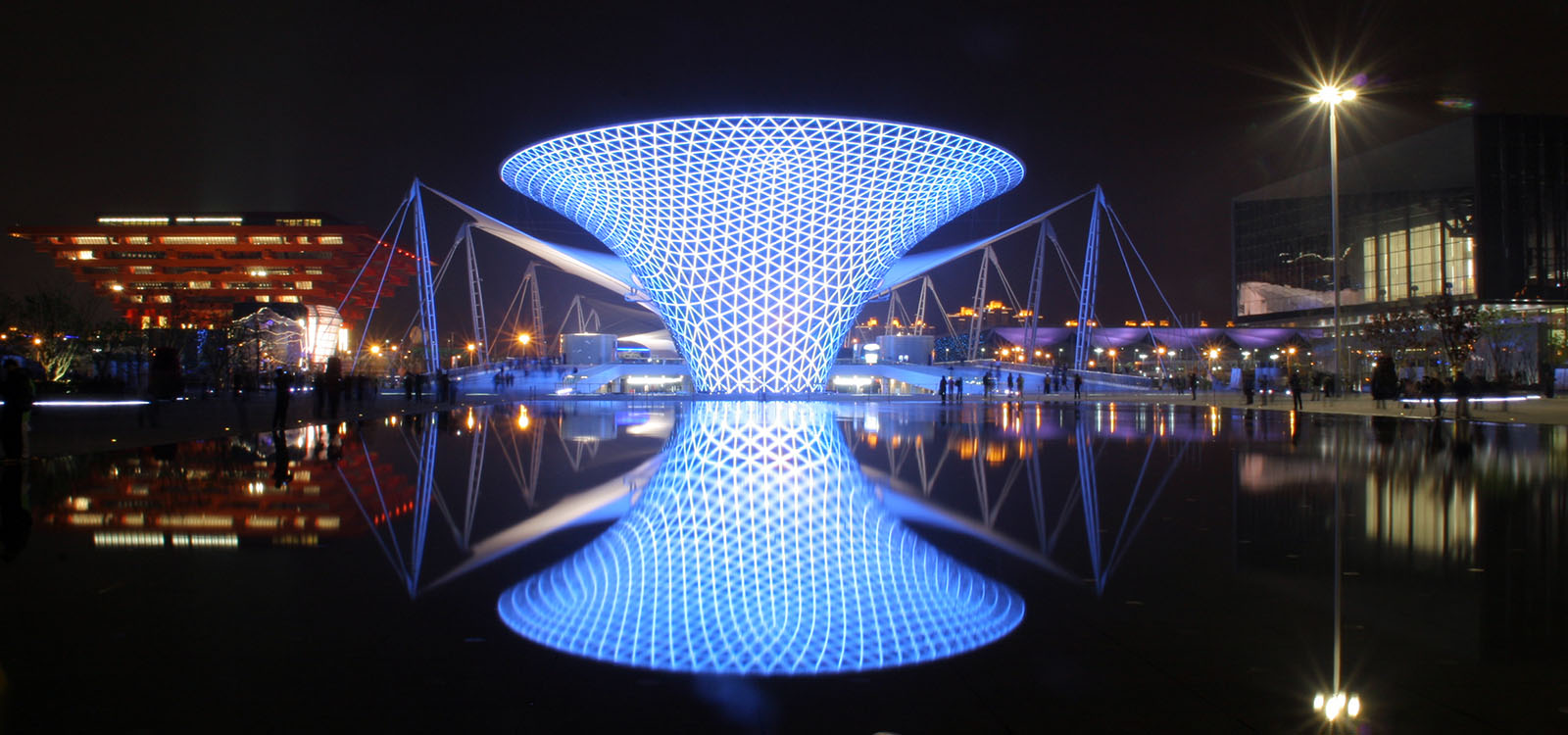
- Nighttime view of the Expo Axis
- Interactive map of the Expo Axis area

General information
- Location: Shanghai, People's Republic of China
- Coordinates: 31.185733°N 121.487986°E
- Construction started: 2006
- Completed: 2010
- Inaugurated: May 1, 2010
- Client: Shanghai World EXPO Land Holding Co. Ltd., Shanghai

Dimensions
- Other dimensions: Projection area Membrane roof: 65,000 m^{2} Span: 100 m Area freeform double-curved framework: 32,000 m^{2} Dimension boulevard: 100 × 1,000 m

Technical details
- Floor area: 334,000 m^{2}

Design and construction
- Architecture firm: SBA International Stuttgart / Shanghai; Cooperation: ECADI, Shanghai
- Structural engineer: Knippers Helbig KHIng Gmbh; Stuttgart / New York City

The Expo Axis is one of the world's largest membrane roofs. It spanned the entrance and boulevard building of the World Exposition 2010 in Shanghai.

The combination of the membrane structure, which has a surface of 65,000 m^{2} in total with a span of 100 m, and the six steelglass funnels of 45 m height, formed of a freeform double-curved framework, constitutes the landmark of the Expo Shanghai 2010.

== Structure ==
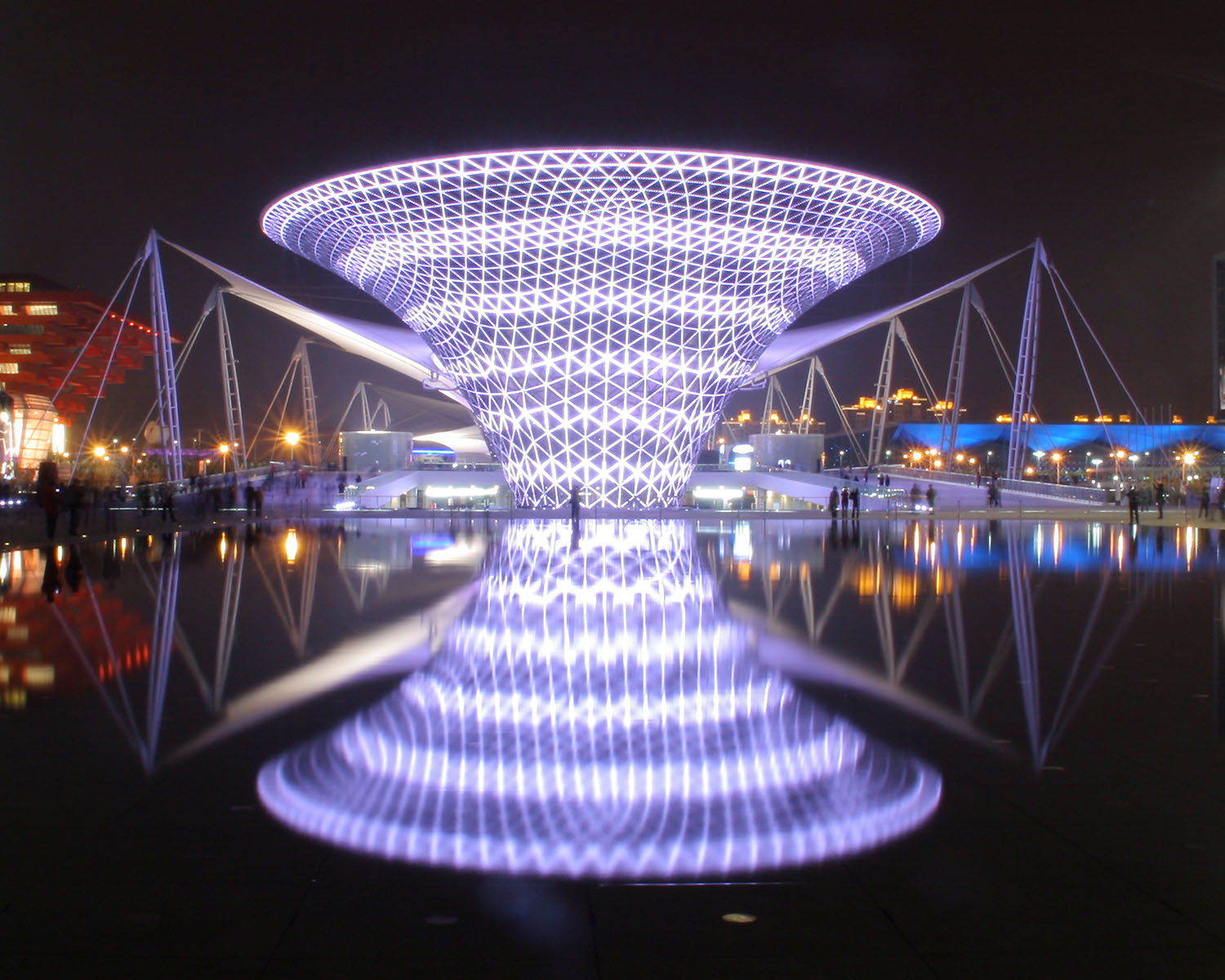
The Expo Axis

Besides the China Pavilion, the Expo Axis is the largest and most significant building on the site. It forms the central entrance area and provides 334,000 m^{2} effective area for numerous facilities. Via the about 1 km long and about 100m wide axis, which stretches across the entire site to the Huangpu River, the visitors are guided to the various national and theme-based pavilions.

The Expo Axis and its boulevard is one of five buildings which remain after the end of the world expo to form the centre of a new urban district of Shanghai.

The Expo Axis is covered by a membrane roof with a total surface of 65,000 m^{2}, currently the largest of its kind in the world. The roof is carried by 19 interior and 31 exterior masts and by six funnel shaped framework shells consisting of steel and glass. It has a height of 45 m and a free projection of 80 m. These so-called Sun Valleys direct natural LED light below.

The design and development of the structure originate from SBA International and Knippers Helbig Advanced Engineering Stuttgart / New York City. In terms of structure and shape, the roof structure lives up to Stuttgart's tradition of the internationally respected lightweight constructions, including the tent construction of the German Pavilion and the Buckminster Fuller-designed geodesic dome American Pavilion at Expo 67 in Montreal.

== Gallery ==
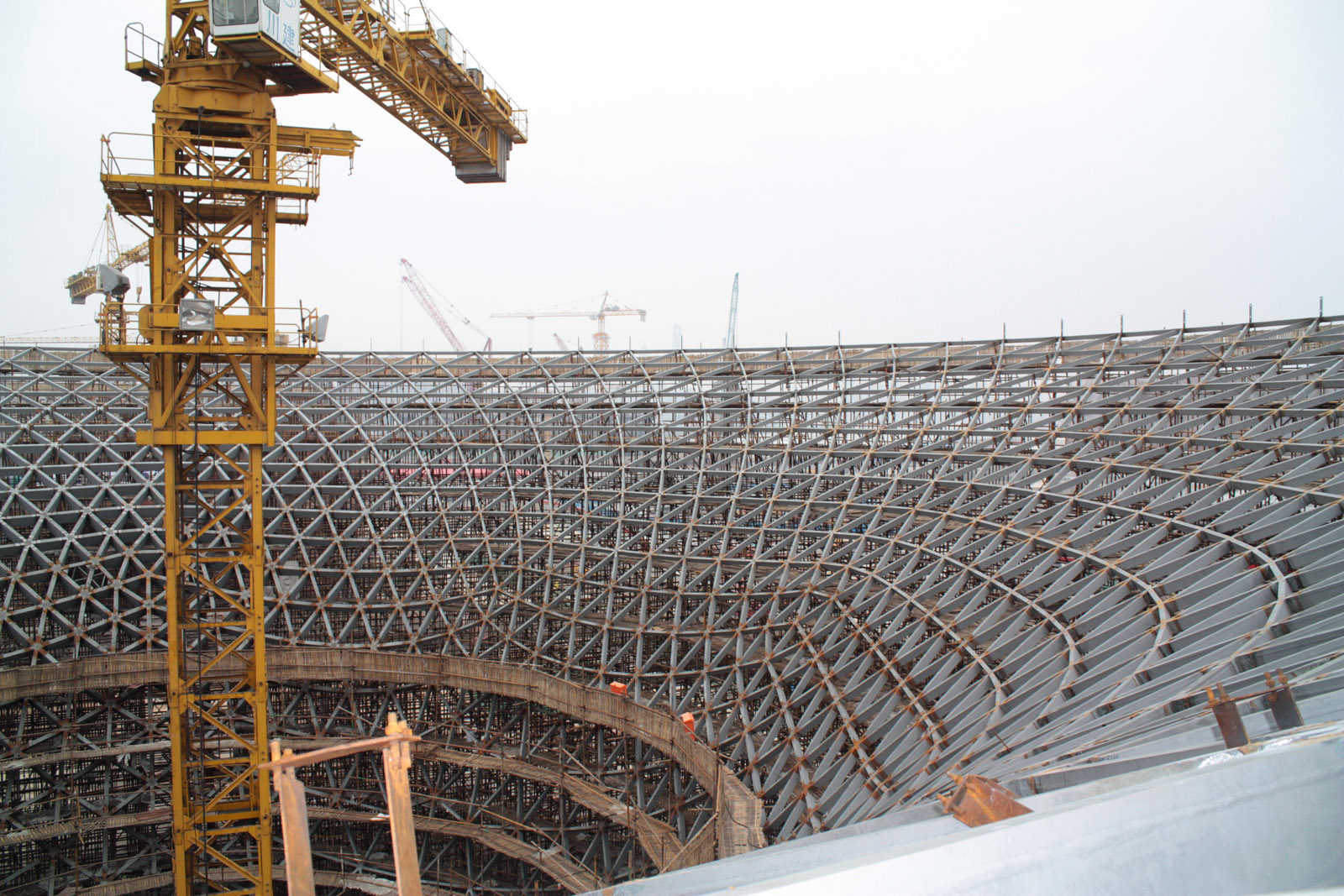
Building site

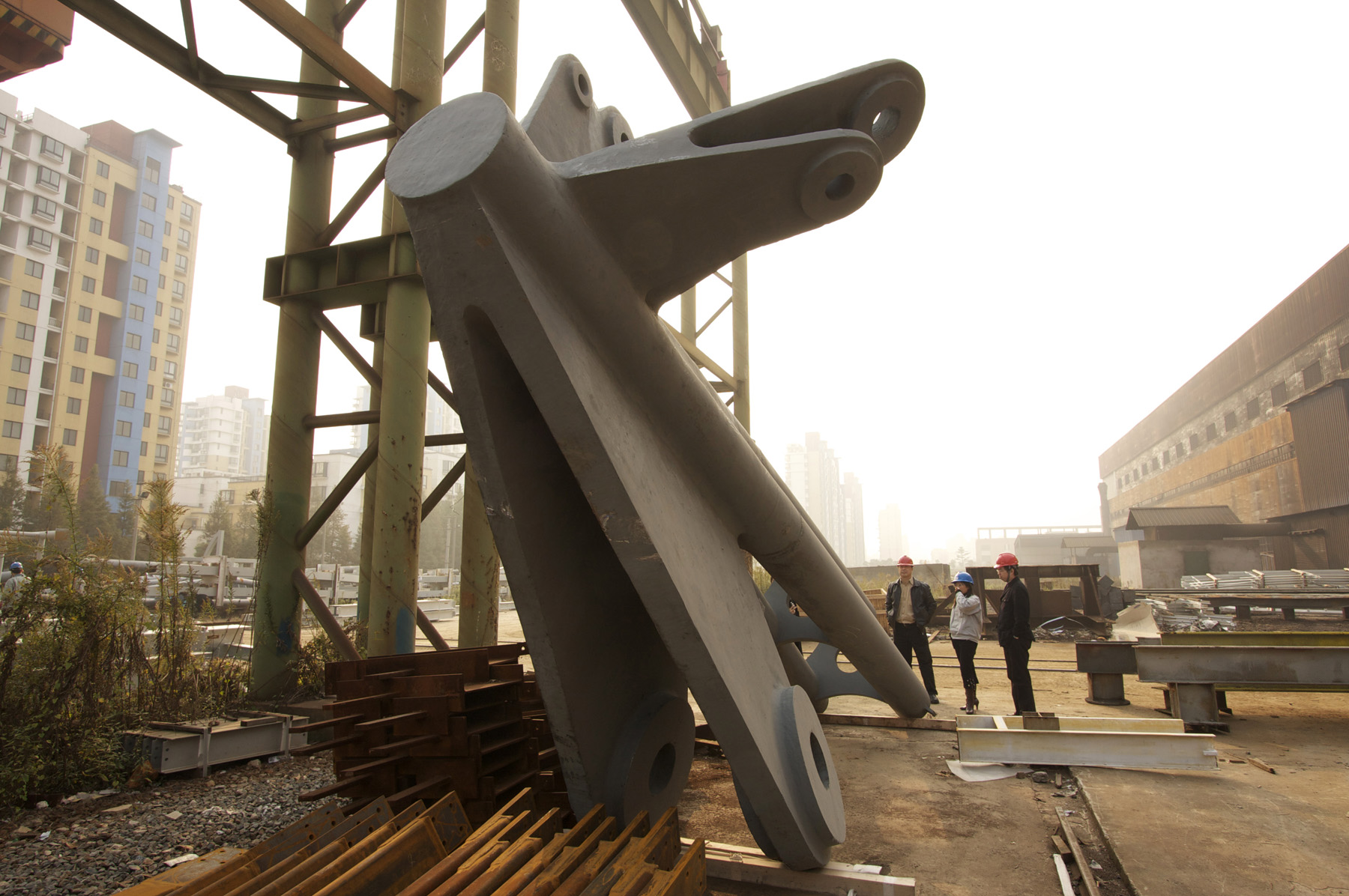
Column head

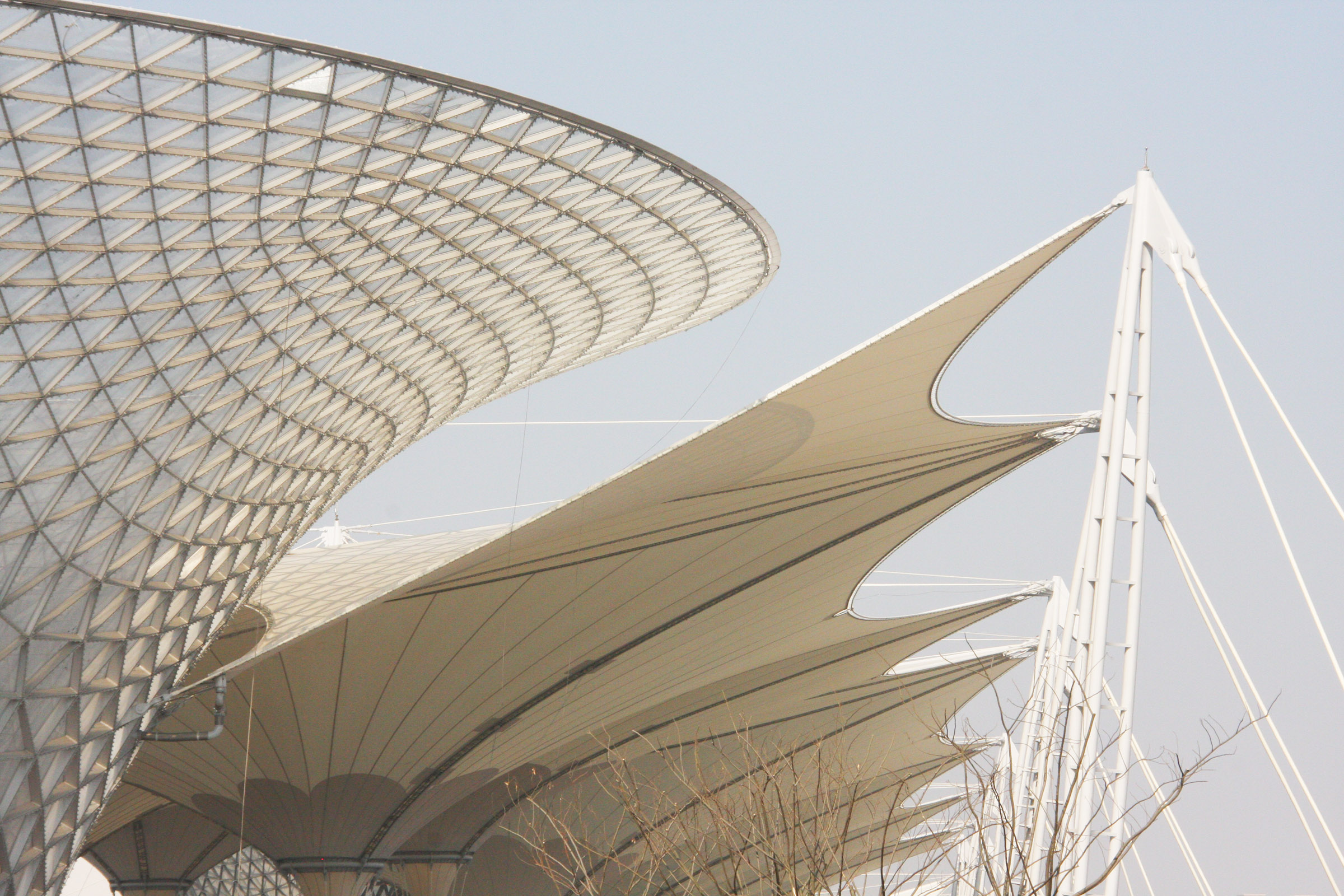
Completed Construction of Expo Axis in December 2009

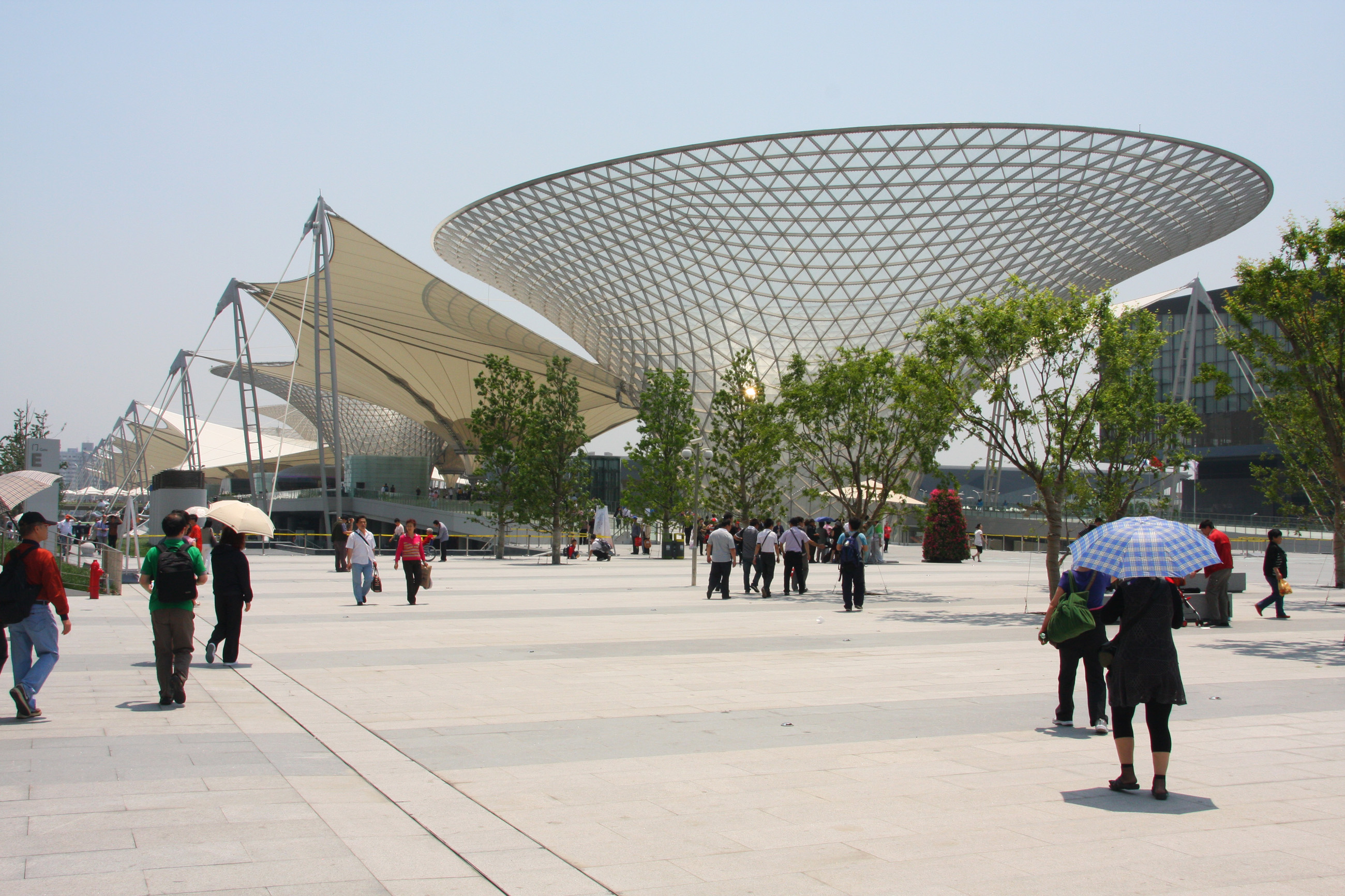
Expo Axis, May 2010

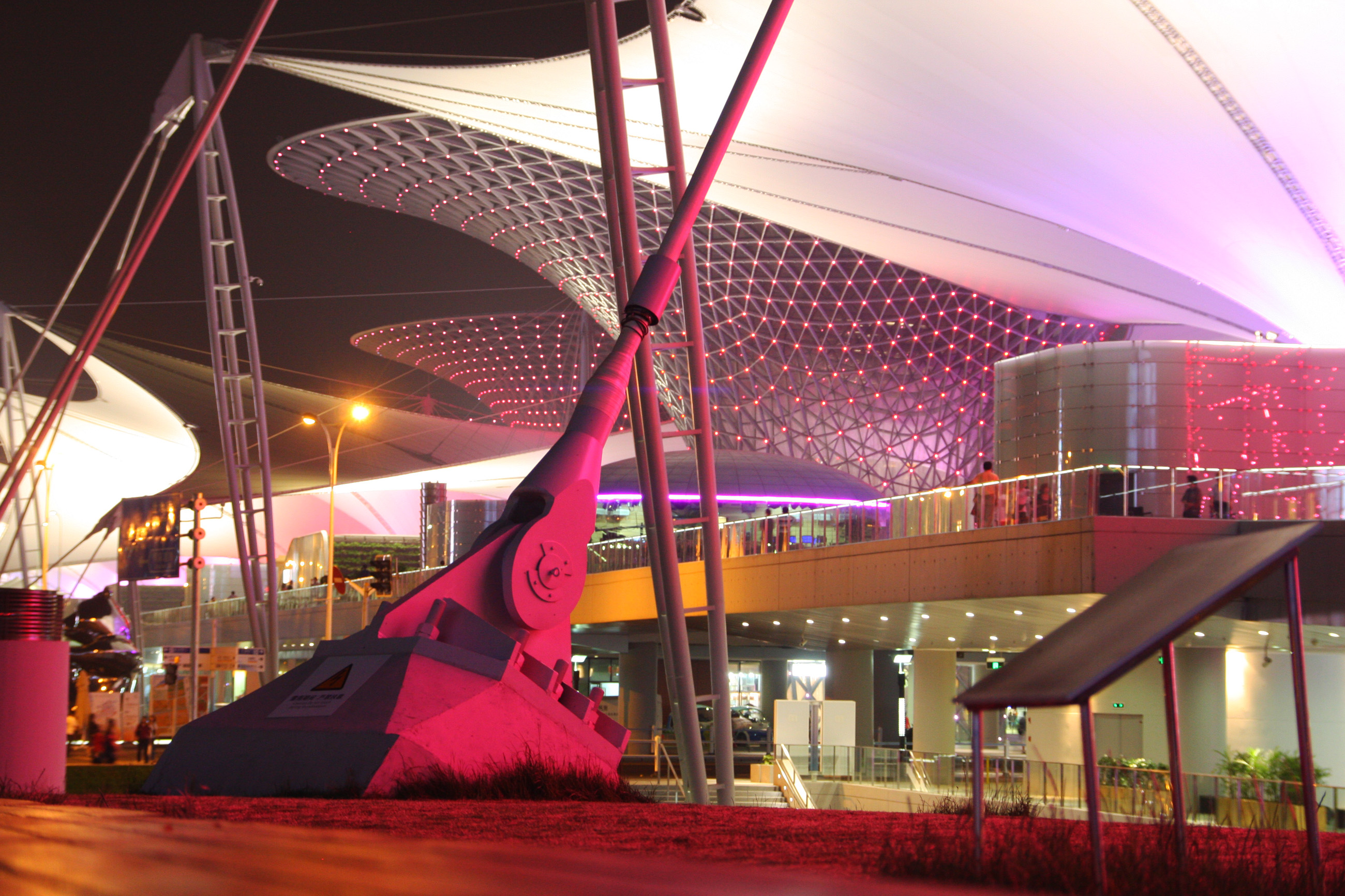
Expo Axis, May 2010

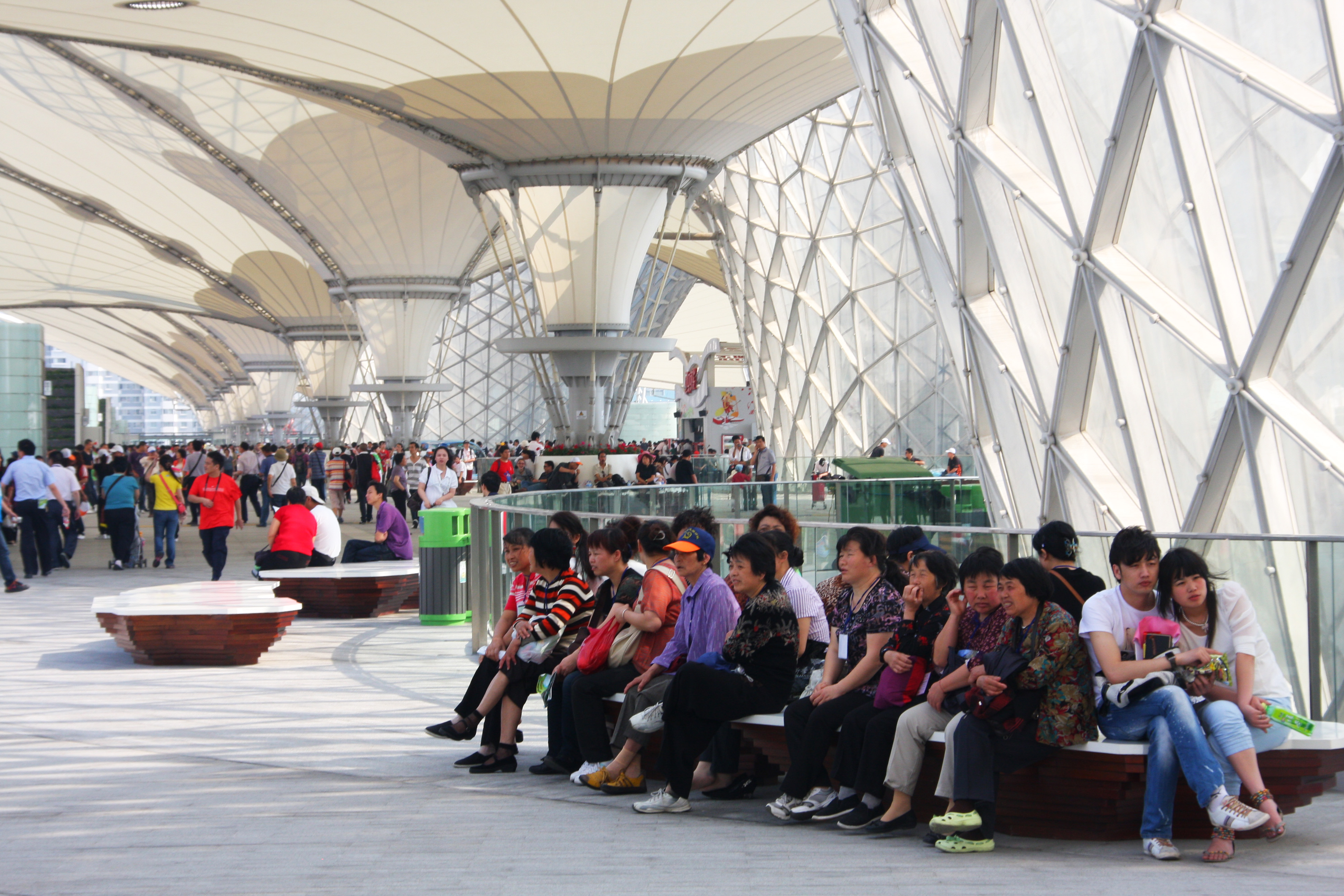
Expo Axis, May 2010

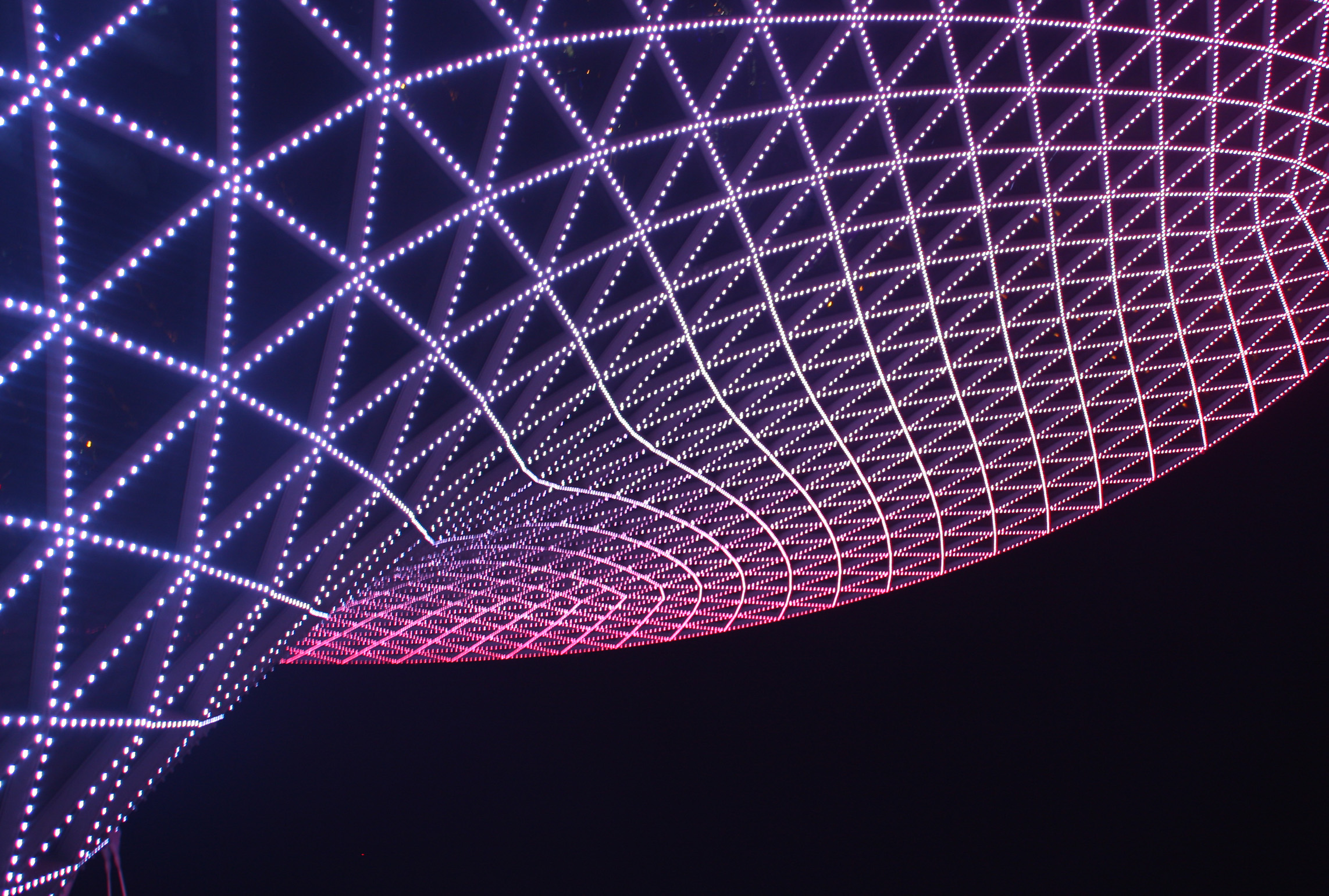
Sun Valley Expo Axis, May 2010

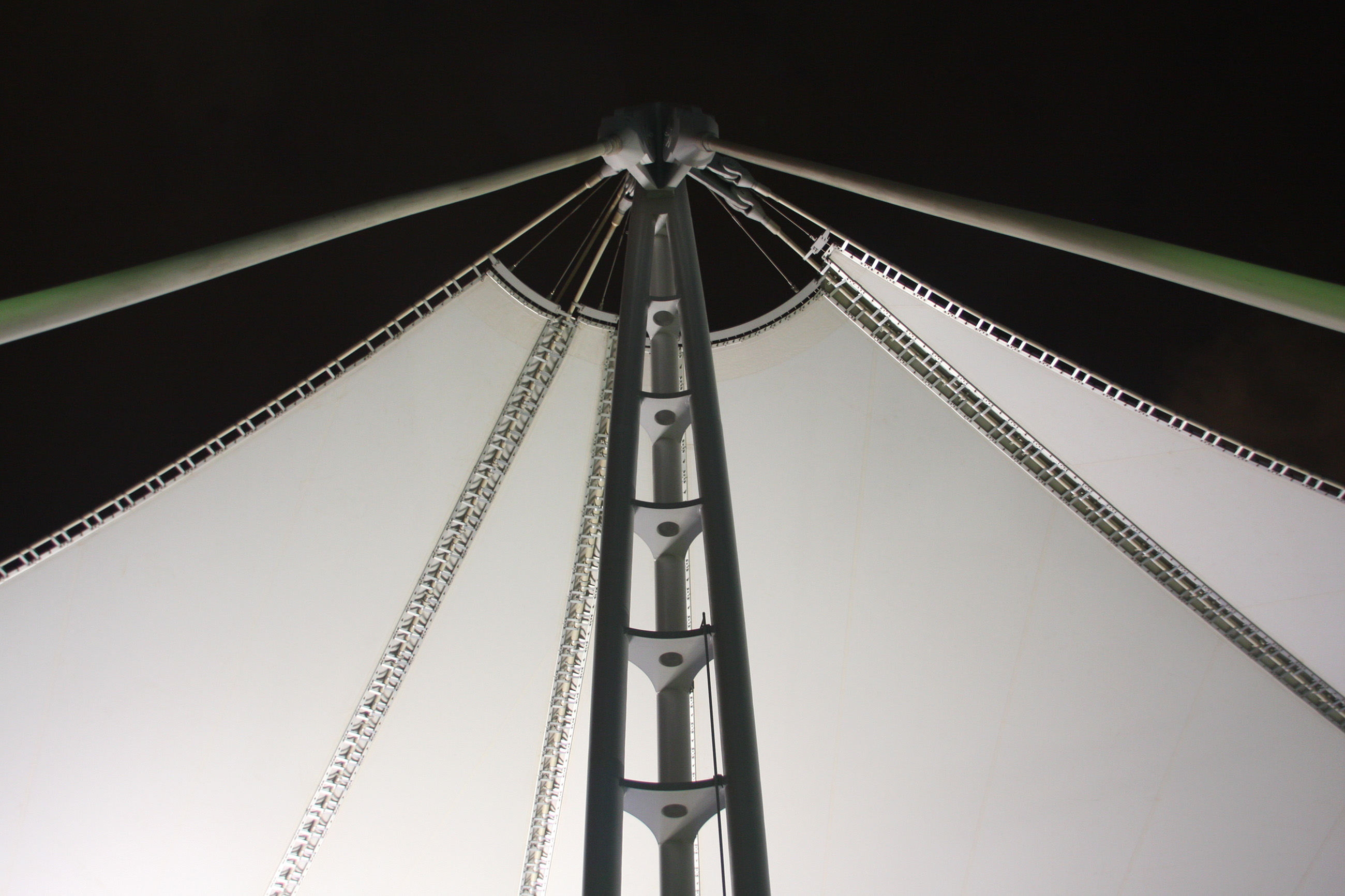
Membrane Construction Expo Axis, May 2010
