= Porta Palazzo Exhibition Hall =

Pavilion in Turin, Italy

The Porta Palazzo Exhibition Hall (sometimes called the New Exhibition Hall) is a large pavilion designed by the Italian architect Massimiliano Fuksas, located in the Aurora district, city of Turin, Northern Italy.

== Plan ==
The hall was originally thought of as a new version of the former old pavilion, in the district of Porta Palazzo, Turin. The former had hosted the Clothes Market, part of the biggest open market in Europe.

== Current ==
Once built, the Municipality of Turin decided not to move the Clothes Market in the New Exhibition Hall. The decision was made because the monumental scale of this work would be more suitable as an exhibition hall. More use concepts were considered, including a “chocolate museum,” but the building is remains empty and unused.
