= Knippers Helbig =

Engineering company

knippershelbig
- Type: GmbH
- Founded: 2001
- Headquarters: Stuttgart, Germany; New York City, United States; Berlin, Germany
- Key people: Thorsten Helbig; Boris Peter
- Services: Structural and facade engineering
- Website: www.knippershelbig.com

Knippers Helbig is an engineering company with headquarters in Stuttgart, New York City and Berlin. It was established in 2001 by Jan Knippers and Thorsten Helbig.

The company focuses on development and programming related to complex parametrical or generated geometries of roof constructions as well as façades comprising steel and glass structures.

== History ==
Knippers Helbig did engineering work on the façade of the Shenzhen International Airport, which featured 60,000 different façade units. The company designed and developed the Expo Axis, which appeared at the 1,000-meter-long and 100-meter-wide axis at the World Expo in Shanghai.

=== Selected projects ===
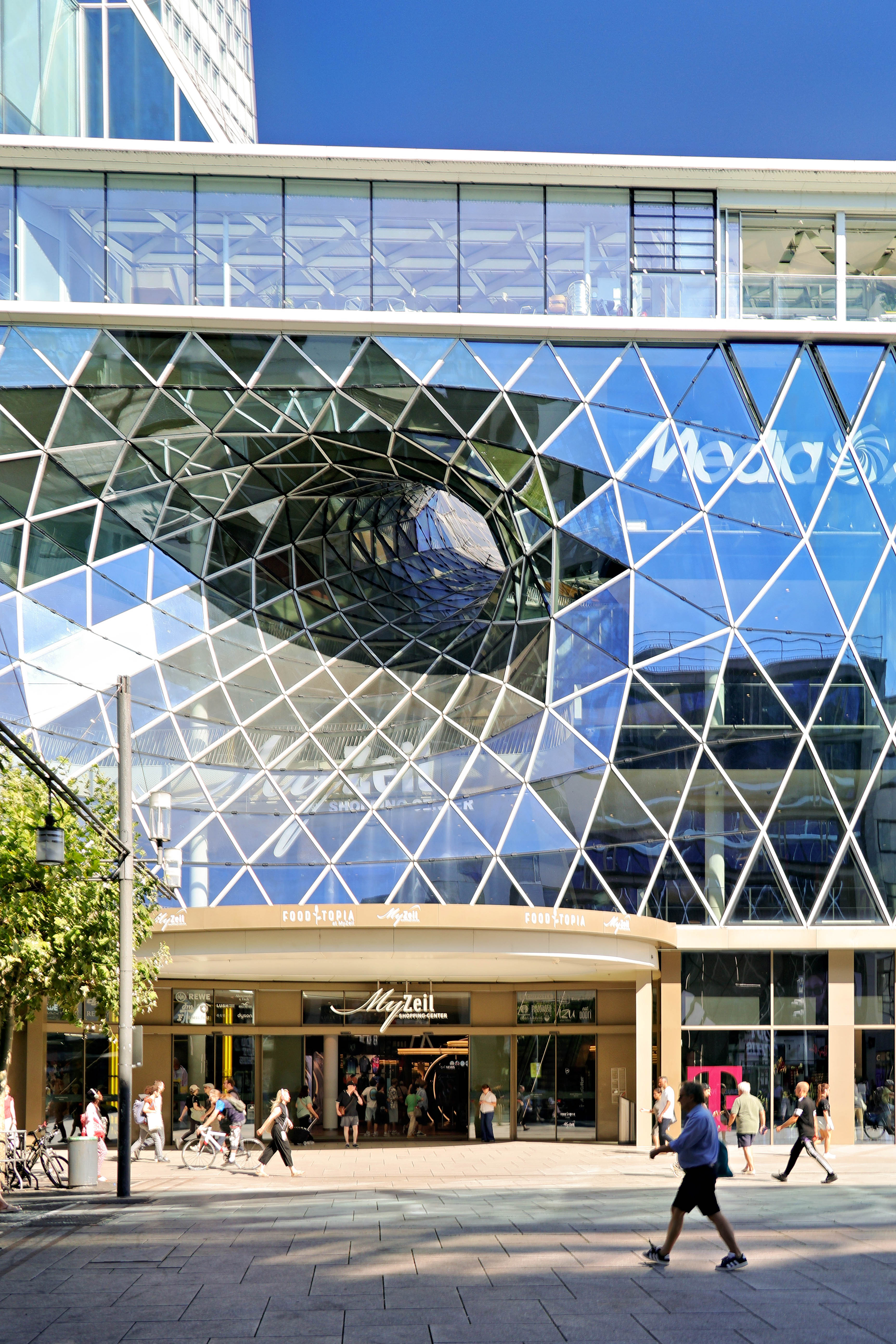
MyZeil, Frankfurt am Main

- 2017: Trumpf Smart Factory, Chicago, United States
- 2013: Shenzhen International Airport, Shenzhen
- 2013: Convention Center, Kigali
- 2012: Theme Pavillon Expo 2012, Yeosu
- 2010: Facades Dubai International Airport Concourse 2 + 3, Dubai
- 2010: Jüberg-tower, Hemer
- 2010: Expo Axis, Shanghai
- 2010: Norwegian Pavillon, Expo Shanghai
- 2010: Youth Center Stuttgart Bad-Cannstatt
- 2009: Freeform Nutshell Westfield, London
- 2009: United Nations Conference Center, Bonn
- 2009: Centre des Sports et des Loisirs, Luxembourg-Belair
- 2008: MyZeil, Frankfurt am Main
- 2008: FRP Brücke, Friedberg
- 2007: Commercial and Apartment building, Mainz
- 2005: Flagship Store Peek & Cloppenburg, Köln
- 2005: Center for Cellular and Biomolecular Research, Toronto

== Competitions ==
- 2011: Quartier M Highrise in Düsseldorf with Jürgen Mayer: 1. Prize
- 2011: Berlin Trade Fair with Wulf Architects: 2. Prize
- 2011: Lansberg Pedestrian Bridge: 1. Prize
- 2010: Kaohsiung Marine Gateway, Taiwan with Asymptote Architecture: 2. Prize
- 2010: IBA Building Complex in Hamburg with Allmann Sattler Wappner Architekten: 1. Prize
- 2010: Exhibition Hall and Station in Kirchberg, Luxembourg with Pohl Architekten Stadtplaner, and SteinmetzDemeyer, architectes urbanistes: 1. Prize
- 2010: Central busstation, Kiel, with Giorgio Gulotta Architects: 2. Prize
- 2010: Footbridge 'Margaretengürtel' in Vienna with Knight Architects: 1. Prize
- 2010: Karlsplatz Stuttgart with Behnisch Architekten: 1. Prize
- 2010: Wilhelmspalais in Stuttgart with Lederer+Ragnarsdóttir+Oei: 1. Prize
- 2009: Train station Cessange, Luxembourg with Pohl Architekten und Steinmetzdemeyer: 2. Prize
- 2009: Pedestrian Bridges, Opladen with Knight Architects: 1. Prize
- 2008: Head office Wala Foundation with H4A Gessert Randecker Architekten: 1. Prize
- 2008: Shenzhen International Airport with Massimiliano Fuksas: 1. Prize
- 2007: Gewandhaus Dresden with Cheret Bozic: 1. Prize
- 2004: Frankfurt International Airport Terminal 3 with Foster and Partners: 2. Prize
