= China pavilion at Expo 2010 =

2010 Expo Pavilion in Shanghai, China

Coordinates: 31°11′11″N 121°29′25″E

China Pavilion
- 中国国家馆
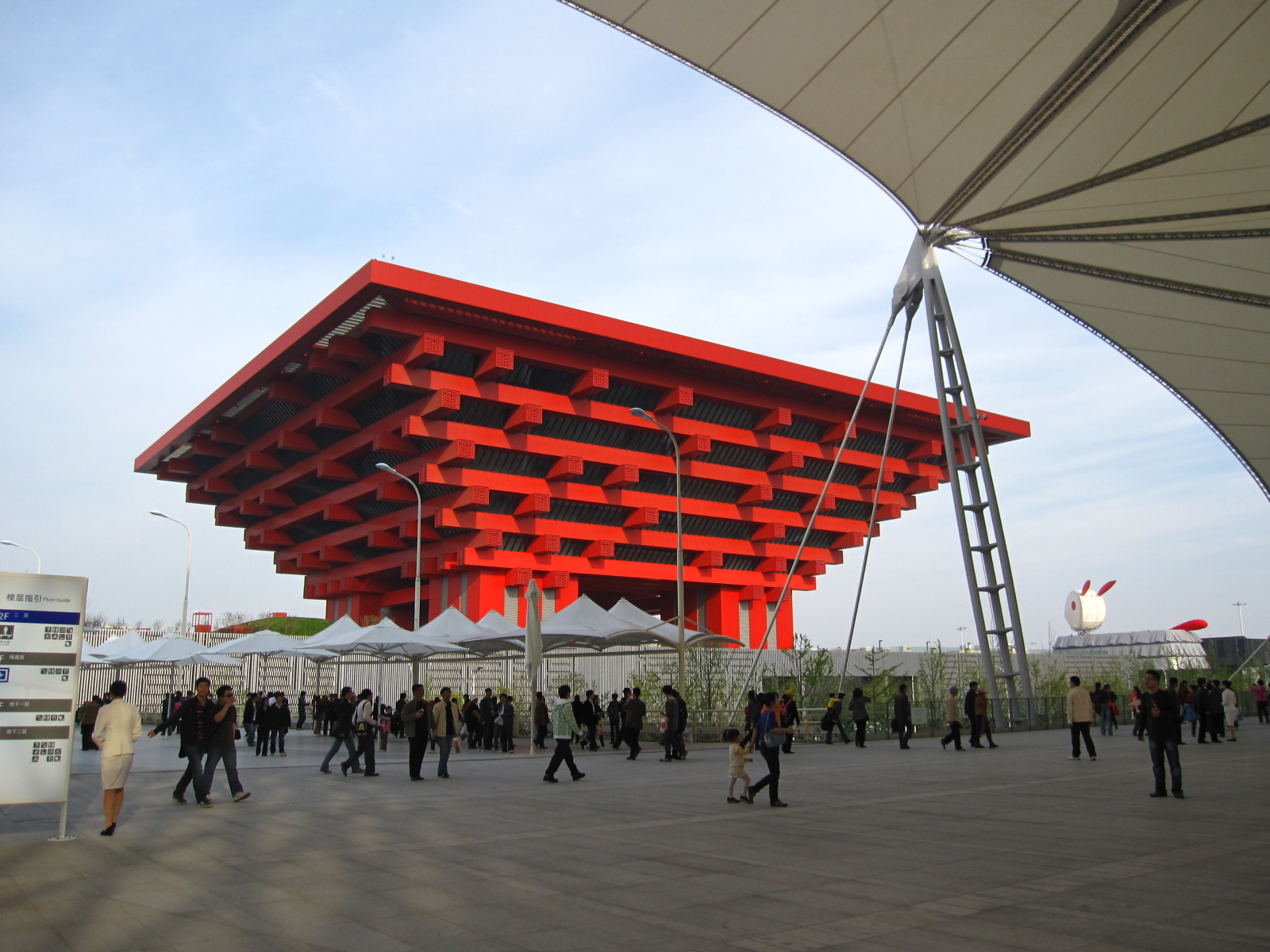
- Interactive map of the China Pavilion area
- Alternative names: Oriental Crown

General information
- Architectural style: Traditional dougong style
- Location: World Expo Park, Shangnan Road, Pudong New District, Shanghai, China
- Current tenants: Bureau of Shanghai World Expo Coordination
- Construction started: 18 December 2007
- Completed: November 2010
- Inaugurated: 8 February 2010

Height
- Roof: 139.8 m × 139.8 m (459 ft × 459 ft)

Technical details
- Structural system: Columns and crossbeams
- Floor area: 2,553 sq.m. underground, 43,904 sq.m. above the ground (gross: 160,126 sq.m.)

Design and construction
- Architect: He Jingtang

Website
- cp.expo2010.cn

The China pavilion at Expo 2010 (simplified Chinese: 中国国家馆; traditional Chinese: 中國國家館; pinyin: Zhōngguó guójiā guǎn) in Pudong, Shanghai, colloquially known as the Oriental Crown (东方之冠; 東方之冠; Dōngfāng zhī Guān), was the largest national pavilion at the Shanghai Expo and the largest display in the history of the World Expo. It was also the most expensive pavilion at the Shanghai Expo, having cost an estimated US$220 million. The pavilion showcased China's civilization and modern achievements by combining traditional and contemporary elements in its architecture, landscaping and exhibits. After the end of the Expo 2010, the building was converted to a museum. On October 1, 2012, it was reopened as the China Art Museum, the largest art museum in Asia.

== Location ==
The building is located halfway along the Expo Axis on its eastern side in Zone A of the Expo Park. The pavilion lies directly to the east of the Theme pavilions and to the north of the Hong Kong and Macau pavilions.

== Construction ==
The chosen design was selected from a range of 344 design proposals put forward by architects from all over the world. The chief architect of the pavilion was 72-year-old He Jingtang, the director of the Architectural Academy of the South China University of Technology. The construction of the China pavilion began on 18 December 2007 and was completed in November 2009. On 8 February 2010, the completion of construction was commemorated by almost 1,000 people including the pavilion's designers and construction workers.

Construction milestones:

Dates	Milestone
December 18, 2007	Groundbreaking ceremony
January 18, 2008	First piling laid
April 14, 2008	Earth excavation started
September 16, 2008	Steel structure work started
December 31, 2008	Capstone laid
February 28, 2009	Design of rooftop garden "New Jiu Zhou Qin Yan" approved
April 25, 2009	Color scheme of the façade confirmed
June 22, 2009	Power supply started
July 31, 2009	Façade complete
February 8, 2010	Construction completion ceremony

== Architecture ==
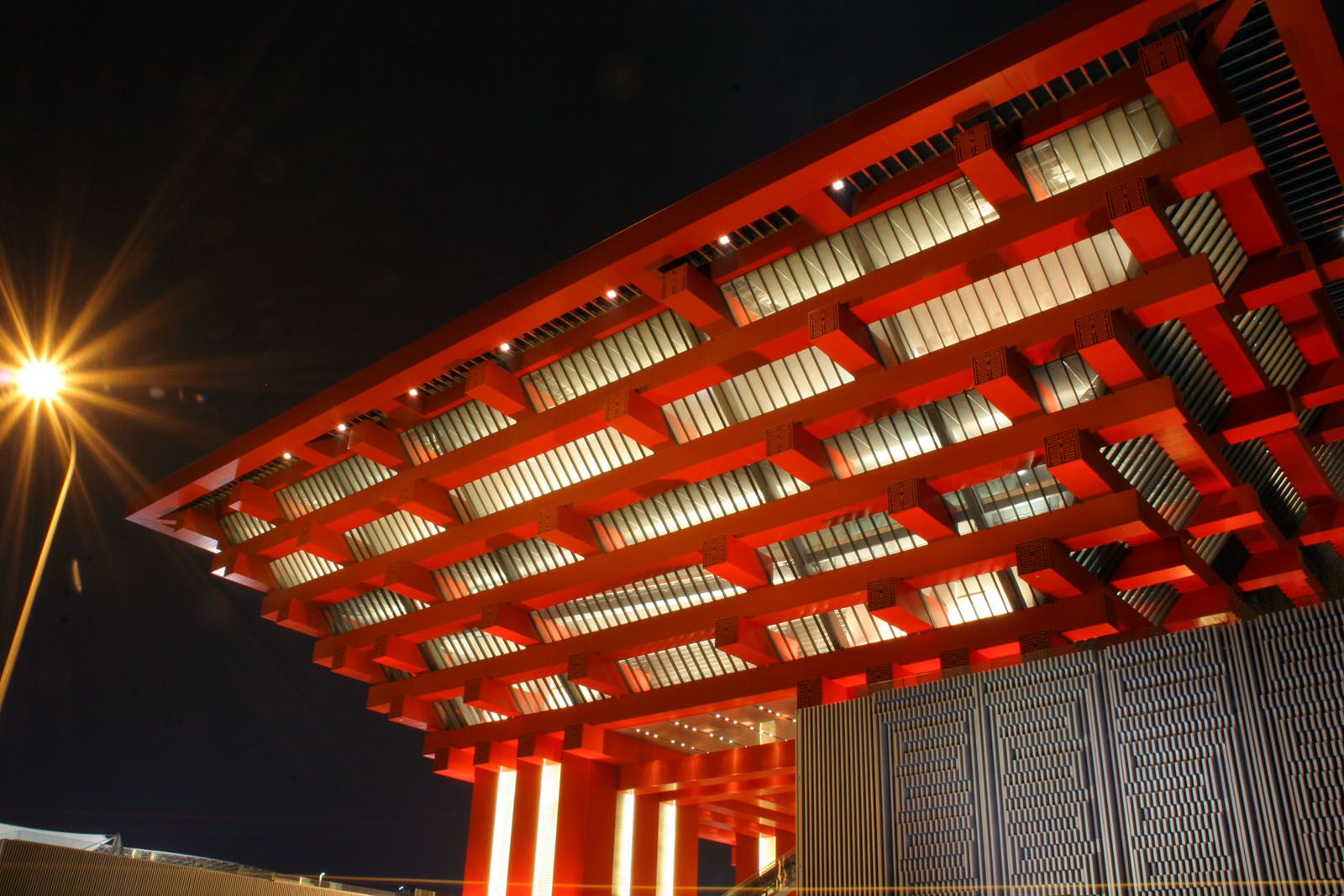
The China pavilion at night

=== Themes and symbolism ===
The 63-metre high pavilion, the tallest structure at the Expo, is dubbed "The Oriental Crown" because of its resemblance to an ancient Chinese crown. It was meticulously designed with profound meaning and symbolism. The architectonic feature of the building was inspired by the Chinese roof bracket known as the dougong as well as the Chinese ding vessel. The dougong is a traditional wooden bracket used to support large overhanging eaves which dates back nearly 2,000 years. It symbolizes the unique charm of Chinese architecture and the unity and strength. The ding was a vessel used by Chinese emperors to make offers to the gods. It represents the union between heaven and earth. The China pavilion's four giant columns resemble the legs of a ding vessel while the inverted pyramid body resembles the bowl of a vessel. The rooftop of the building is in the shape of a grid-like pattern reminiscent of Jiugongge when view from the air. Jiugongge was the basis of urban planning in ancient China. The exterior is painted in seven subtle shades of Chinese red, symbolizing Chinese culture and good fortune. The different shades combine effectively to illustrate the concept "unity with difference". The overhanging columns of the main China pavilion and exterior of the Chinese joint provincial pavilion are decorated with Diezhuan characters, calligraphic characters used on official seals. The characters for north, south, east and west are engraved on the red China pavilion, while 24 Chinese solar terms are carved into the silver facade of the provincial pavilion.

=== Sustainable design ===
The structure was built with a strong emphasis on sustainable and energy-saving practices with the exterior offering thermal insulation and natural ventilation. The inverted pyramid design and the lower courtyard offers a large overhang for self-shading. There is a 0.36 mega-watt solar energy system on the rooftop while the thermal panels and insulating glasses on the exterior are energy-saving initiatives.

=== Rooftop garden ===
A high-tech rooftop garden surrounding the China pavilion and on top of the Chinese Joint Provincial pavilion is known as "New Jiuzhou Qing Yan" The 27,000-square metre traditional garden contains modern landscaping techniques and technology including rainwater harvesting techniques and is decorated with distinctly Chinese-style landscaping inspired by the Jiuzhou Qing Yan in the Yuanmingyuan. It was designed to emulate natural Chinese landscapes with Chinese wisdom and oriental charm in mind. The garden provides space for public recreation and crowd evacuation. It uses nine landscaping features to symbolize nine characteristic topographies of China, namely, human habitat (here represented by the main building itself), farmlands, lakes, mountains, seas, forests, alpine meadows, valleys and deserts.

== Exhibition ==
The theme of the pavilion during the Expo was "Chinese Wisdom in Urban Development". To enter the pavilion visitors must ascend the giant staircase on the north-facing side. The sheltered courtyard space within the four main columns provides a large open space for waiting crowds. The pavilion display highlights is divided into three parts: "The Footprints", "The Dialogue" and "The Vision". Visitors are taken by lift to the uppermost level for the first exhibition before working their way down the building for the subsequent segments.

=== Highlight 1: The Footprints (Core Exhibition) ===
This first part highlights the wisdom of Chinese urban practices in Chinese history, from the achievements of China's reforms in the late 1970s to the urban experiences of imperial China.

==== Pre-show Hall ====
This hall features iconic symbols of a city.

==== Story of Spring ====
In this exhibition, two seven-minute films are alternately shown in the 1,071 square metre 700-seat theatre of the pavilion. The films are shown on three 22m-long by 7.5m-high projection screens and a 24m-diameter overhead dome. Both films reflect the social and urban impact of China's economic transformation.

- Thematic movie 1: "The Road to our Beautiful Life" (Chinese: 历程; pinyin: Lìchéng) directed by Lu Chuan highlights the developments of modern China in the last 30 years through the eyes of four generations of the same family. The film begins with a countryside scene showing an elderly father and his young adult son facing each other. The father is from a humble peasant background and symbolizes tradition, wisdom and the patriarch of the family. The son then walks away and begins to sprint around the rural landscape towards the city, soon to be followed by numerous others. Although the son grew up with his peasant father, he moves into the city as a migrant worker together with his future wife. This symbolises the start of China's urban development and nation-building in the 1970s. The son represents the courage and unrelenting spirit of his generation and the great achievements made in urban development in China in the last few decades. Next, the grandson is introduced as a growing child in the 1980s who emerges from a revolving door as an adult in the mid-2000s. He was brought up in the city and has lived in a developing urban environment all his life. The Sichuan earthquake is brought to the fore when the son witnesses the tragedy personally. The son's generation has absorbed the wisdom and knowledge of his father and grandfather, taking a courageous China into a world of globalisation. The final scene features an image of a fetus and the infant great-grandson interacting with his great-grandfather. The great-grandson symbolises new life, hope and the future of China.
- Thematic movie 2: "Harmonious China" (Chinese: 和谐中国; pinyin: Héxié Zhōngguó) directed by Zheng Dasheng integrates three Confucius quotations with the themes of change, diversity and the future in China. The initial scene contains the film's tile rendered in Chinese calligraphy. A simple brush-stroke then gradually changes to show a night scene of Shanghai's Pudong skyline. The film quotes Confucius: "What passes away is, perhaps, like his. Day and night it never lets up." A scene of an average Chinese family's living room changing over the years is shown with scenes of China's urban development on the two side screens from the 1970s to the present day. The next quote "The gentleman agrees with others without being an echo" is displayed with a panoramic scene of the heart of Beijing from Jingshan Park. The modern Chinese city and its people are shown along with the lavish wedding of a young couple, China's modern architecture and images from a Chinese theatre performance. The last quote "Follow my heart's desire without overstepping the line" highlights the future decades through an idyllic lakeside scene rendered as a Chinese painting.

==== River of Wisdom ====
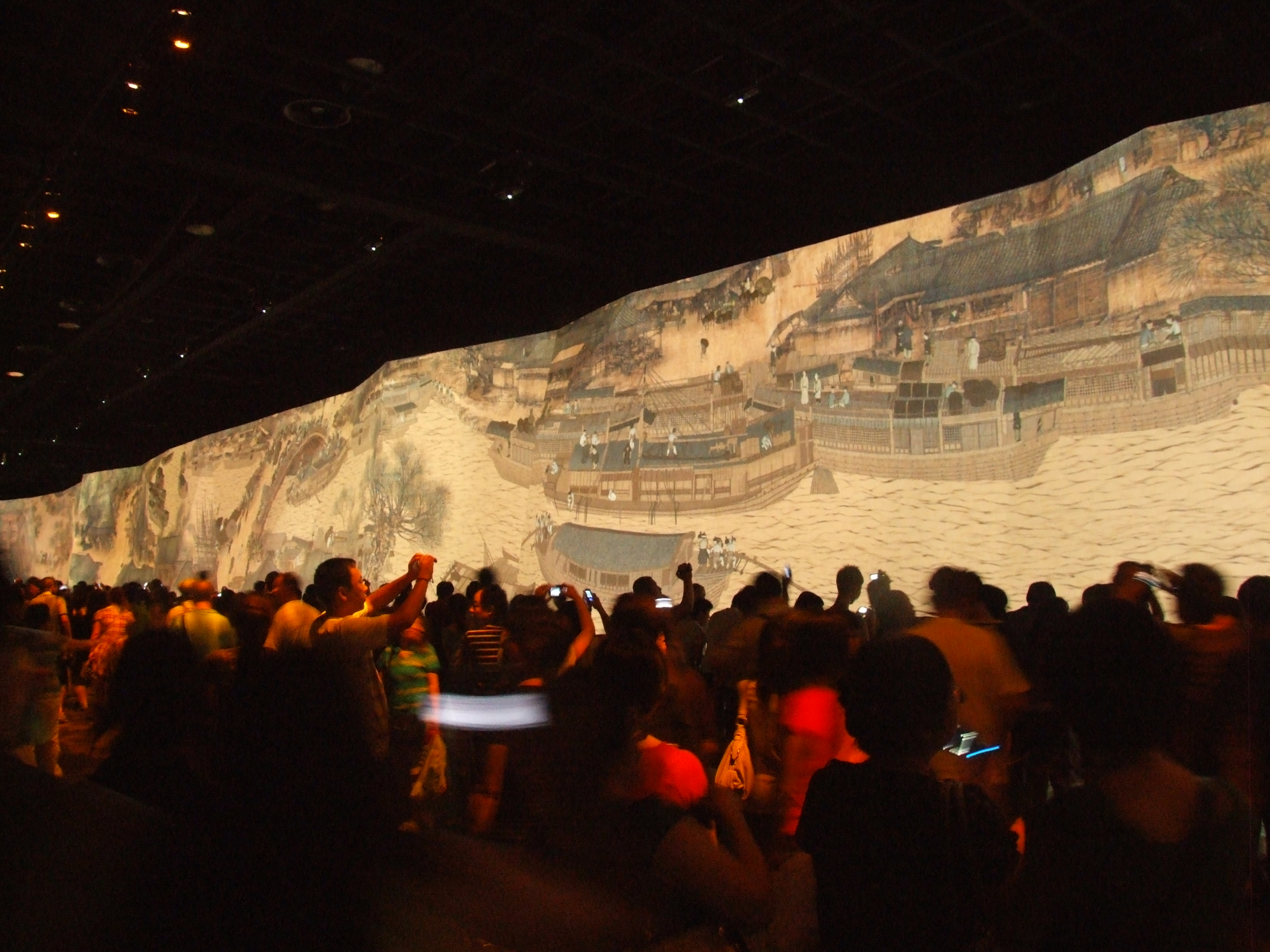
Along the River During the Qingming Festival

- The Scroll: The Scroll is Zhang Zeduan's Song dynasty masterpiece Along the River During the Qingming Festival and re-adapted as a large-scale 3D animation. The animation is projected onto a massive screen which is 128 metres long and 6.5 metres high and features all of the original painting's 1068 figures as well as boats, vehicles and animals. All the characters move within the landscape and perform their everyday tasks. The animation also features a 2-minute-long night scene.
- National Treasures:
  - In May 2010: Qiu Ying's copy of Along the River During the Qingming Festival.
  - From June 2010 to October 2010, except 1 October: The No.1 Bronze Chariot and Horse from the Mausoleum of the Qin Shi Huangdi Terracotta Army is displayed. The statue features a four-horse chariot and a chariot master all cast in bronze with sophisticated precision and technique. The statue is life-sized and made to the correct proportions. Along with the rest of the terracotta army, it was buried underground for 2,000 years until it was unearthed in 1980.
  - On 1 October 2010: Zhang Zeduan's genuine Along the River During the Qingming Festival.
- Crystals of Civilisation: Sixteen individual ancient Chinese artifacts are displayed behind security glass. The pieces range from porcelain to bronzes to models of Chinese architecture.

==== Land of Hope ====
A world of greenness symbolizes the harmony between the people as well as that between Man and Nature in future Chinese cities. The Chinese-style development strategy of urban-rural integration is a key message here.

- Green Homeland: Dazzling hanging plants, illuminated shade trees and simulated wetland represent the urban ideal of harmonious coexistence between man and nature.
- Under the Same Roof: Created by Artist David Niles and Niles Creative Group. A 2-minute multimedia experience shows the "ideal neighbourhood" of future cities. Improved quality of life in modern society does little to help bond a neighbourhood together. The show applies a series of interesting interactions with magical scene shifts to show the breaking of "walls" between neighbors and life "under the same roof" in future cities.
- Rural-Urban Duet: The futuristic "bamboo grove" indicates both future cities surrounded by Nature and healthy rural-urban linkages.

=== Highlight 2: The Dialogue (The Ride) ===
With an area of 3400 sq.m., excursion trains on a 340m-long track provide visitors with a 6-minute ride exploring urban wisdom and the dialogue between the past and present. The exhibits include "Gates of History", "Stone Bridges", "Dougong Matrix", "Tunnel of Planning" "Heavenly Garden and Garden City".

=== Highlight 3: The Vision (Thematic Exhibition) ===
An exploration of a lower-carbon future in China. It shows how China is inspired by nature and will develop innovative solutions to meet the challenges of urban growth and environmental protection. The exhibits are represented simply by one of the four main mathematical operations: addition, subtraction, multiplication and division (+, -, ×, ÷)

Warning from Nature

The minus sign represents that reliance on fossil fuel shall be reduced and efficiency in energy consumption shall be improved to reduce waste.

Proper Exploration

The addition sign represents that increase of carbon emission is threatening global environment and hampering the development of human society.

Measured Consumption

Individual actions of reduced consumption can have a great effect, given the population of the country.

Return to Simplicity

The multiplication sign represents that individual actions can add up to a great effect, given the large population in the country.

Fountain of Illumination

The division sign represents that the ambitious forest carbon sink plan, if divided by a large population, is a rational target.

== During the Expo ==
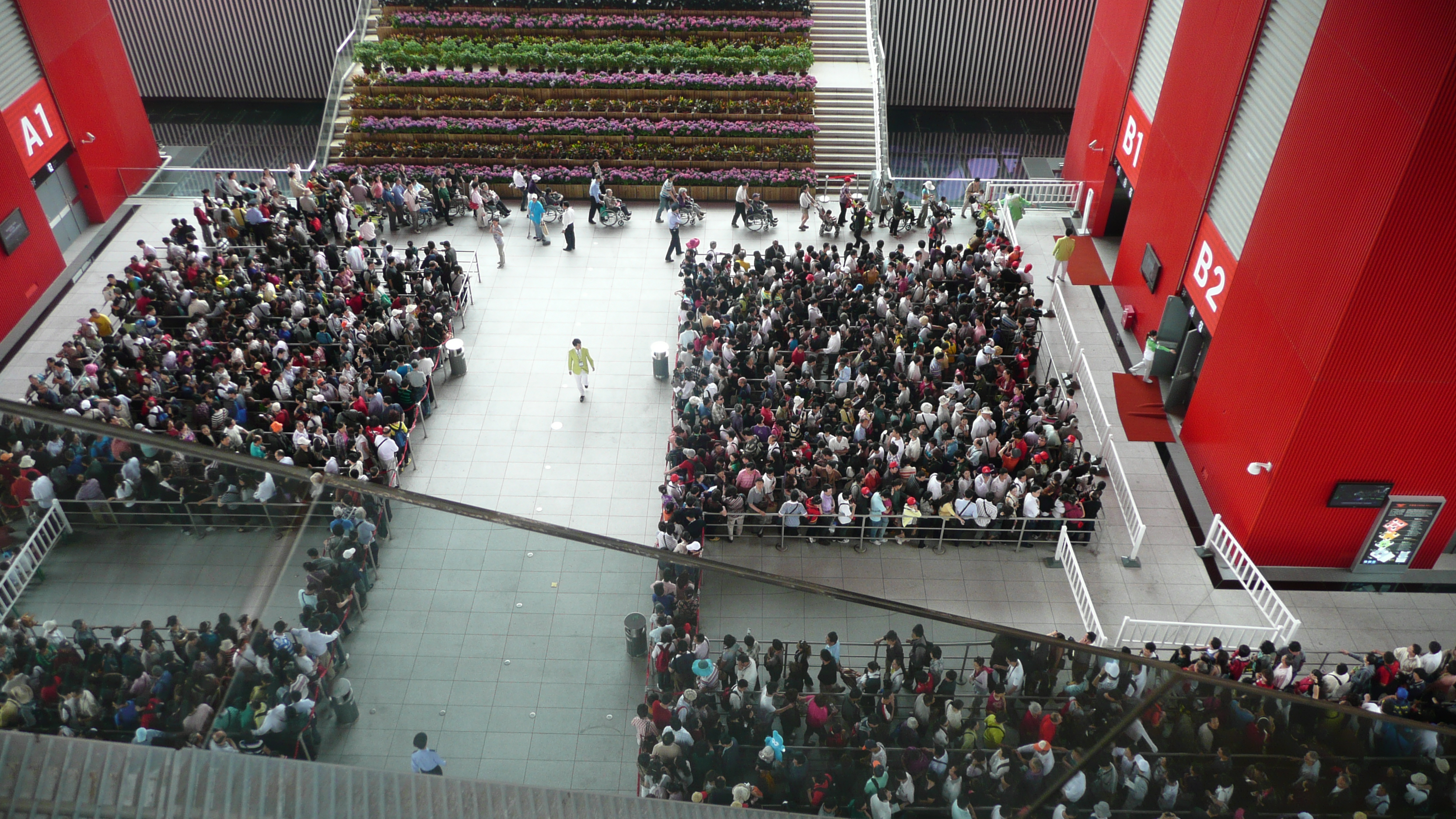
Waiting crowds inside the central courtyard

The China pavilion was designed to accommodate up to 50,000 visitors over the course of any given day. Despite the fact that 73 million people visited the Shanghai Expo over a six-month, only 10 million visitors were able to see the China pavilion due to the huge numbers. The pavilion opened for nearly 13 hours a day.

== After the Expo ==
While most pavilions were temporary structures and dismantled after the end of the Expo, the China pavilion, along with the theme pavilions, the Expo Cultural Center, and the Expo Axis are permanent buildings. The China pavilion was temporarily reopened on 1 December 2010 for half a year, with the same exhibits as those shown during the Expo. On 1 October 2012, the pavilion was reopened as the China Art Museum, the largest art museum in Asia.
