= Ludwig Börne =

German-Jewish political writer and satirist (1786–1837)

Karl Ludwig Börne
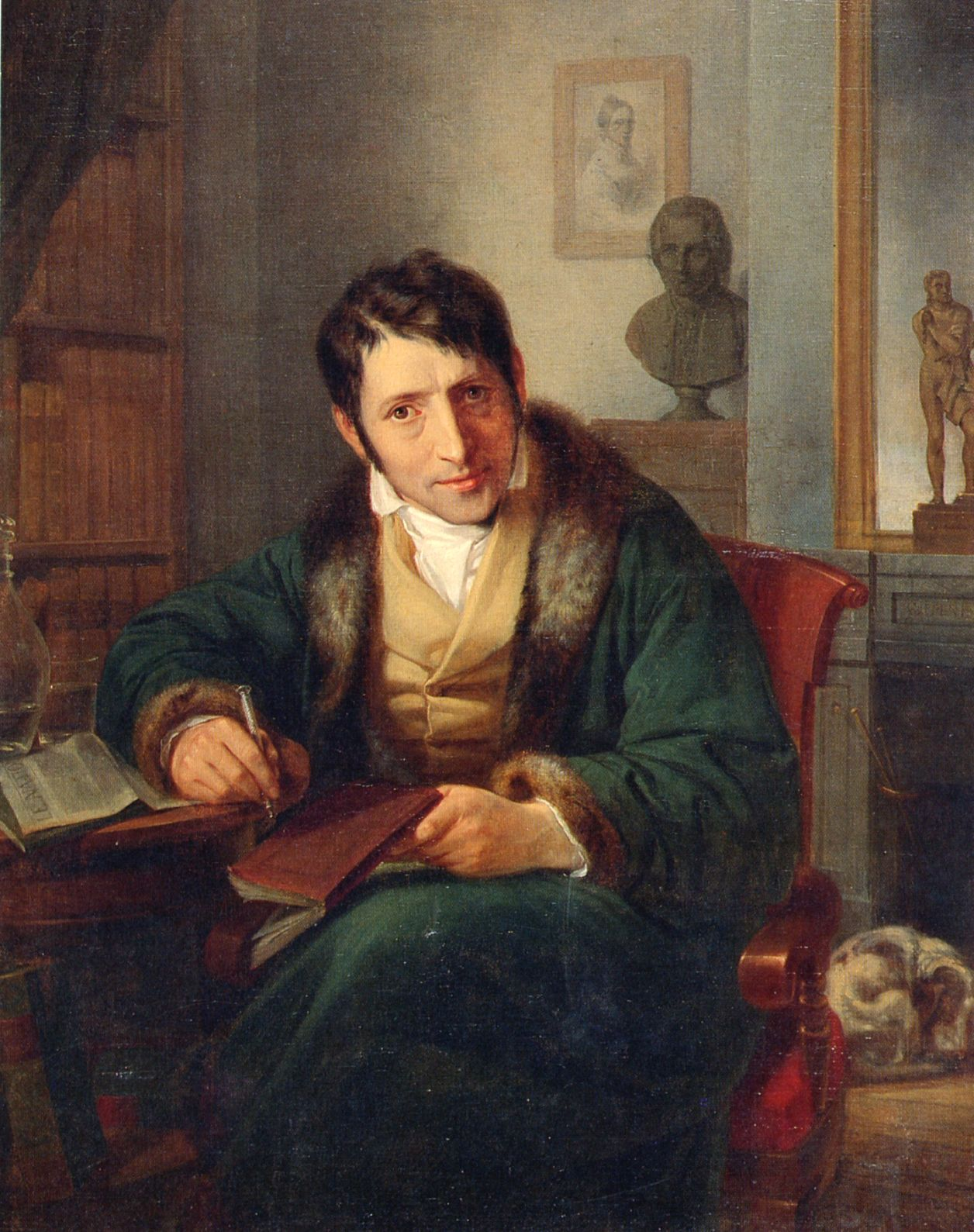
- 1827 portrait
- Born: Juda Löw Baruch; 6 May 1786; Free Imperial City of Frankfurt
- Died: 12 February 1837 (aged 50); Paris, France
- Resting place: Pere Lachaise Cemetery
- Education: Halle University; University of Heidelberg
- Occupations: Writer; Political philosopher
- Writing career
- Language: German
- Notable works: (1820) "Juden in der freien Stadt Frankfurt" (1822) Der Esskunstler (1826) Denkrede auf Jean Paul (1829) Monographie der deutschen Postschnecke (1829–1834) Dramaturgische Bltter (1837) Menzel der Franzosenfresser

Karl Ludwig Börne (born Judah Löw Baruch; 6 May 1786 – 12 February 1837) was a [German political writer and satirist, who is considered part of the Young Germany movement.

== Early life ==
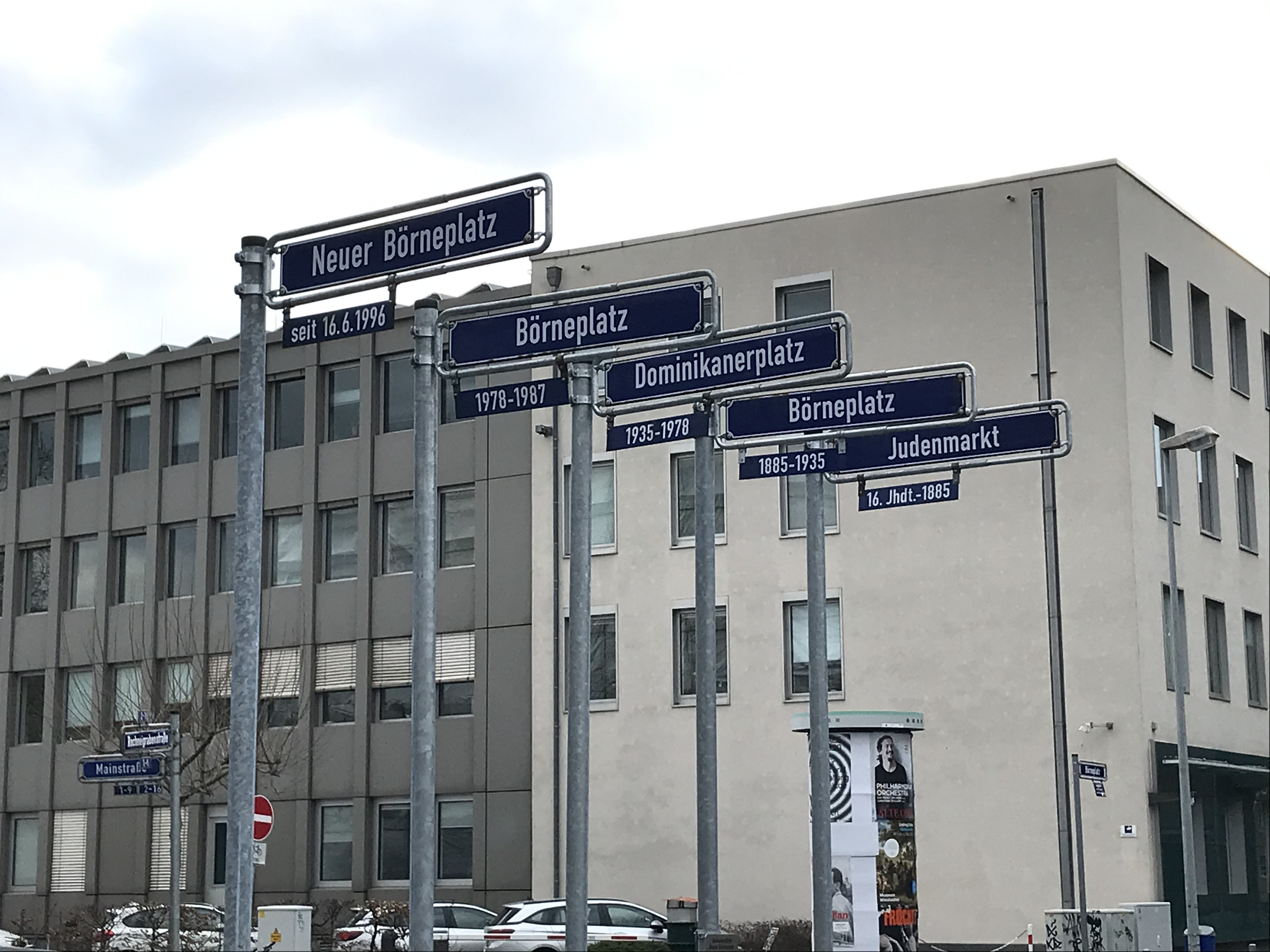
Neuer Börneplatz Frankfurt am Main

Karl Ludwig Börne was born Loeb Baruch on 6 May 1786, at Frankfurt am Main, to a Jewish family living in the Frankfurter Judengasse. He was the third son of Jakob Baruch, a banker. His grandfather had been a government bureaucrat and funded the construction of a community synagogue.

== Education ==
Börne and his brothers were privately tutored by Jacob Sachs, and later by Christian Julius Wilhelm Mosche. At age 14, he entered a private boarding school run by the orientalist Wilhelm Friedrich Hezel in Gießen, where he prepared for university studies. After a year, he was sent to study medicine at Berlin under a physician, Markus Herz, in whose house he lived. At age 16, Baruch became infatuated by his patron's 38-year-old wife, Henriette Herz. After her husband died in 1803, he expressed his adoration in a series of letters. When he enrolled at Halle University, she was influential in his boarding with Professor Reil. He abandoned his medical studies in favor of constitutional law and political science at the University of Heidelberg and Giessen. There, he received his PhD in 1809 with the dissertation Ueber die Geometrische Vertheilung der Staatsgebiete. He was admitted to Freemasonry in Frankfurt's lodge in 1808.

== Career ==
On his return to Frankfurt, now constituted as a part of the Grand Duchy of Frankfurt under the sovereignty of the prince-bishop Karl von Dalberg, who had granted the Jewish community broader citizenship rights, he received the appointment of police actuary in 1811.

In 1814, he was forced to resign his post because he was Jewish and those limited civil rights were revoked. Embittered by the oppression suffered by Jews in Germany, he took to journalism and edited the Frankfurt liberal newspapers Staatsristretto and Die Zeitschwingen.

== Later life ==
In 1818, he converted to Lutheran Protestantism and changed his name from Juda Löw Baruch to Ludwig Börne, in part because he hoped to access better professional opportunities. From 1818 to 1821, he edited Die Wage, a paper distinguished by its lively political articles and its powerful but sarcastic theatrical criticisms. In these years he also wrote some of his major works on the history of Jewish Frankfurt, including Juden in der freien Stadt Frankfurt (1820).

Die Wage was suppressed by the police, and in 1821, Börne took a pause from journalism and led a quiet life in Paris, Hamburg, and Frankfurt.

After the July Revolution (1830), he hurried to Paris, expecting to find society nearer to his own ideas of freedom. Although to some extent disappointed in his hopes, he did not look any more kindly on the political condition of Germany; this lent additional zest to the brilliant satirical letters (Briefe aus Paris, 1830–1833, published Paris, 1834), which he began to publish in his last literary venture, La Balance, a revival of Die Wage. The Briefe aus Paris was Börne's most important publication, and a landmark in the history of German journalism. Its appearance led him to be regarded as a leading thinker in Germany.

== Death and legacy ==
Nothing is permanent but change, nothing constant but death. Every pulsation of the heart inflicts a wound, and life would be an endless bleeding were it not for Poetry. She secures to us what Nature would deny – a golden age without rust, a spring which never fades, cloudless prosperity and eternal youth.

— Ludwig Börne, quoted by Heinrich Heine in The Journey to the Harz (1824)

Börne died in Paris in 1837.

Börne's works are known for brilliant style and for thorough French satire. His best criticism is to be found in his Denkrede auf Jean Paul (1826) – a writer for whom he had warm sympathy and admiration –, in his Dramaturgische Blätter (1829–1834), and the witty satire Menzel der Franzosenfresser (1837). He also wrote a number of short stories and sketches, of which the best known are the Monographie der deutschen Postschnecke (1829) and Der Esskünstler (1822).

In his first volume of Sigmund Freud's biography, Ernest Jones relates that "Böeme" [sic] was an especial favourite in Freud's adolescence, a half century later quoting many passages from the essay "How to Become an Original Writer in Three Days," which clearly played a part in the writing strategy Freud used in his self-analysis and developed into his free association method for during psychoanalysis:

Here follows the practical prescription I promised. Take a few sheets of paper and for three days in succession write down, without any falsification or hypocrisy, everything that comes into your head. Write what you think of yourself, of your women, of the Turkish War, of Goethe ... of the last judgment, of those senior to you in authority – and when the three days are over you will be amazed at what novel and startling thoughts have welled up in you. That is the art of becoming an original writer in three days.

In an essay published anonymously, Freud wrote that the Börne collection he had received as a teenager was one of the few childhood books he had kept, and, upon rereading "How to Become an Original Writer" in light of his theories of free association, observed, "It seems then that we can not rule out that this reference has uncovered one of those bits of cryptomnesia which in so many cases may be supposed to lie behind a seeming originality."

In 1885, Frankfurt's Jewish Market (Judenmarkt) was renamed Börneplatz in honor of his centennial, as was the synagogue built there in 1882. (The site was destroyed and renamed Dominikanerplatz, a reference to the nearby Dominican Monastery, by the Nazis in 1935, but the name was restored in 1978. Since 1996 it has been a Holocaust memorial maintained by the Jewish Museum Frankfurt.)

Two portraits of him, by the Jewish painter Moritz Daniel Oppenheim, are in the Israel Museum Collection.

The town of Boerne in the U.S. state of Texas, founded by German liberal immigrants (Forty-Eighters), is named after him. The town is a part of the San Antonio metropolitan area.

The Ludwig Börne Prize has been awarded to German-language nonfiction writers since 1993; previous winners include Dan Diner, Robert Habeck, and Daniel Kehlmann.

The University of Giessen established the Ludwig Börne Professorship in 2015; the position is held by political scientist Claus Leggewie.

The Börne Gallery at the Jewish Museum Frankfurt in Frankfurt, Germany, is also named after him.

== Bibliography ==
- "How to Become an Original Writer in Three Days," (1823, trans. Leland de la Durantaye, 2006)
- Gesammelte Schriften (trans. "Collected Writings"), in 4 volumes (1829–1834)
- Nachgelassene Schriften (trans. "Posthumous Writings"), in 6 volumes (Mannheim, 1844–1850)
- Nachgelassene Schriften (trans. "Posthumous Writings"), in 12 volumes (Hamburg, 1862–1863, reprint 1868)
- Nachgelassene Schriften (trans. "Posthumous Writings") edited by A. Klaar in 8 volumes (Leipzig, 1900)
- Börnes Leben (trans. "The Life of Börne"), (Hamburg: K. Gutzkow, 1840)
- L. Börne, sein Leben und sein Wirken (trans. "L. Börne, his Life and his works"), (Berlin: M. Holzmann, 1888)
- Börnes Briefe an Henriette Herz (trans. "Börne's Letters to Henriette Herz"), (1802–1807) re-edited by L. Geiger (Oldenburg, 1905)
- Börnes Berliner Briefe (trans. "Börne's Berlin Letters") (Berlin, 1905)
- Historische Schriften (trans. "Historical Writings"), (Darmstadt: G. Gervinus, 1838). (essay)
- Hovedströmninger i det 19 de Aarhundredes Litteratur volume vi. (Copenhagen: G. Brandes, 1890; German trans. 1891; English translation 1905)
- Das junge Deutschland (trans. "The Young Germany") (Stuttgart: J. Proelss, 1892).
- Ludwig Börne zum zweihundertsten Geburtstag: Für die Juden (trans. "Ludwig Börne on his bicentenary: For the Jews"), ed. Renate Heuer (Frankfurt: Archiv Bibliographia Judaica, 1986), a collection of his writings on Frankfurt's Jews and the Judengasse, including Juden in der freien Stadt Frankfurt, trans. "Jews in the Free City of Frankfurt," 1820.

== See also ==
- Memorial Neuer Börneplatz

== Sources ==
- Heine, Heinrich; Sammons, Jeffrey L (2006) [1840]. Ludwig Börne: A Memorial. Camden House. ISBN 978-1-57113-342-7.
