= Memorial at the Frankfurt Grossmarkthalle =

Coordinates: 50°06′33″N 8°42′21″E

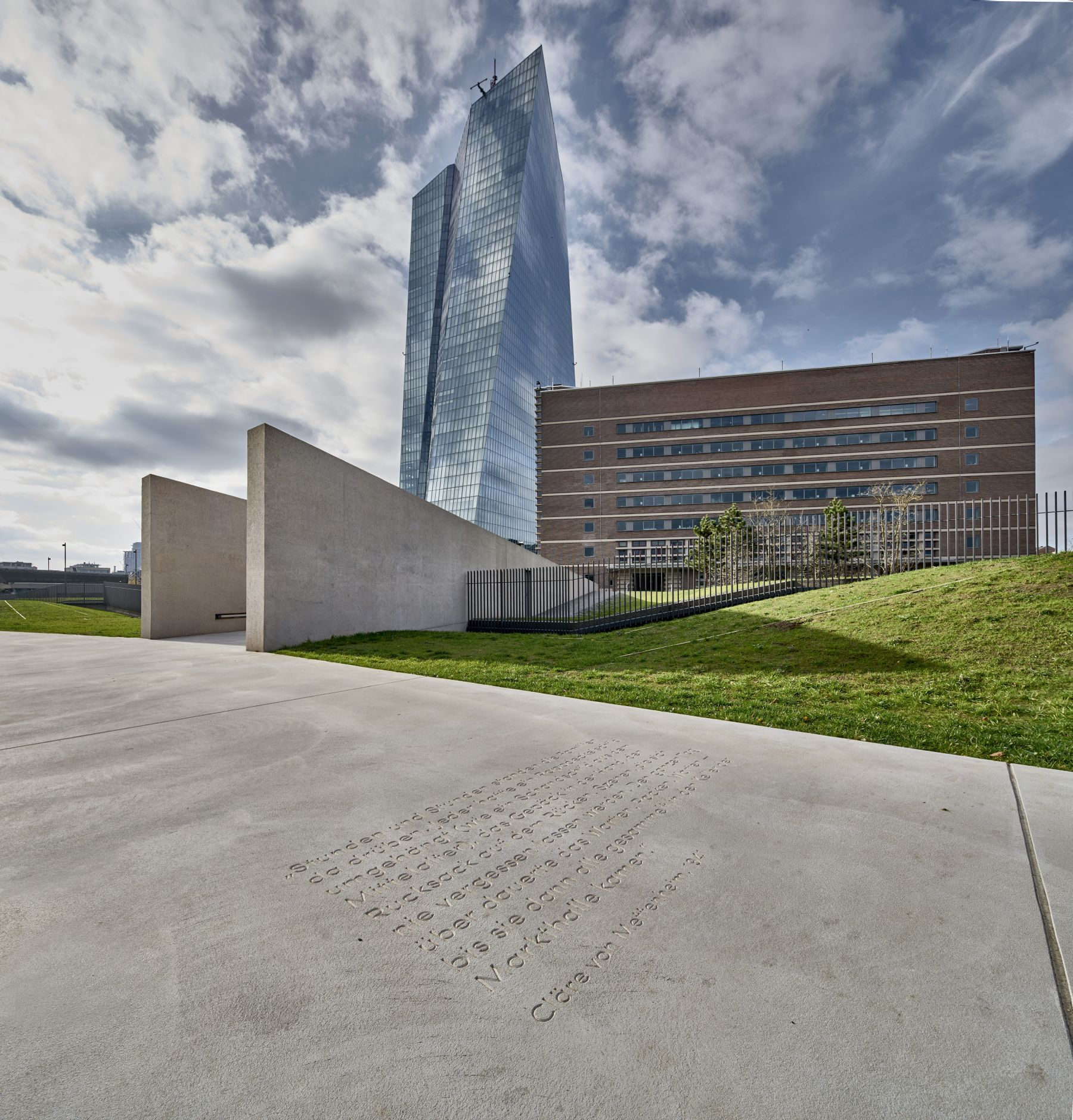
Memorial at the Frankfurt Grossmarkthalle. The building of the former Grossmarkthalle with the new building of the European Central Bank can be seen in the Background.

The Memorial at the Frankfurt Grossmarkthalle (German: Erinnerungsstätte an der Frankfurter Großmarkthalle) commemorates the deportation of Jews from Frankfurt am Main in Nazi Germany during the Holocaust. From 1941 to 1945, the Gestapo used the cellar of the Grossmarkthalle as a gathering place for the deportation of Jews from the city and the Rhine-Main area. During ten mass deportations between October 1941 and September 1942 alone, about 10,050 people were deported from the Großmarkthalle railway station in freight trains to ghettos, concentration and extermination camps and subsequently murdered. As far as is known, only 179 deportees survived the Second World War.

== Planning ==
Starting in 2009, the City of Frankfurt am Main, in close cooperation with the European Central Bank (ECB) and the Jewish community of Frankfurt, planned a memorial at the Frankfurt Grossmarkthalle. This site was to commemorate the organized murder of the Jews as a result of the National Socialist extermination policy and inform the public about this atrocity. According to the invitation to tender, the spatial relation to the historical location of the event needed to be maintained and public space had to be included. 139 architects, landscape architects, urban planners, artists and students took part in an open international competition for the design of the memorial. In July 2009, a jury chaired by the Frankfurt architect, Nikolaus Hirsch, selected twenty designs from the first competition phase for an in-depth examination. The jury met again at the end of May 2010. After further revisions of the designs in small groups, Tobias Katz and Marcus Kaiser won the competition in 2011.

It took another four years before the memorial was opened. On 22 November 2015, the City of Frankfurt am Main handed over the memorial to the public. The Jewish Museum Frankfurt worked on a scholarly reappraisal of the history of the deportations, made accessible to the public in a new permanent exhibition starting in 2019.

== Layout ==
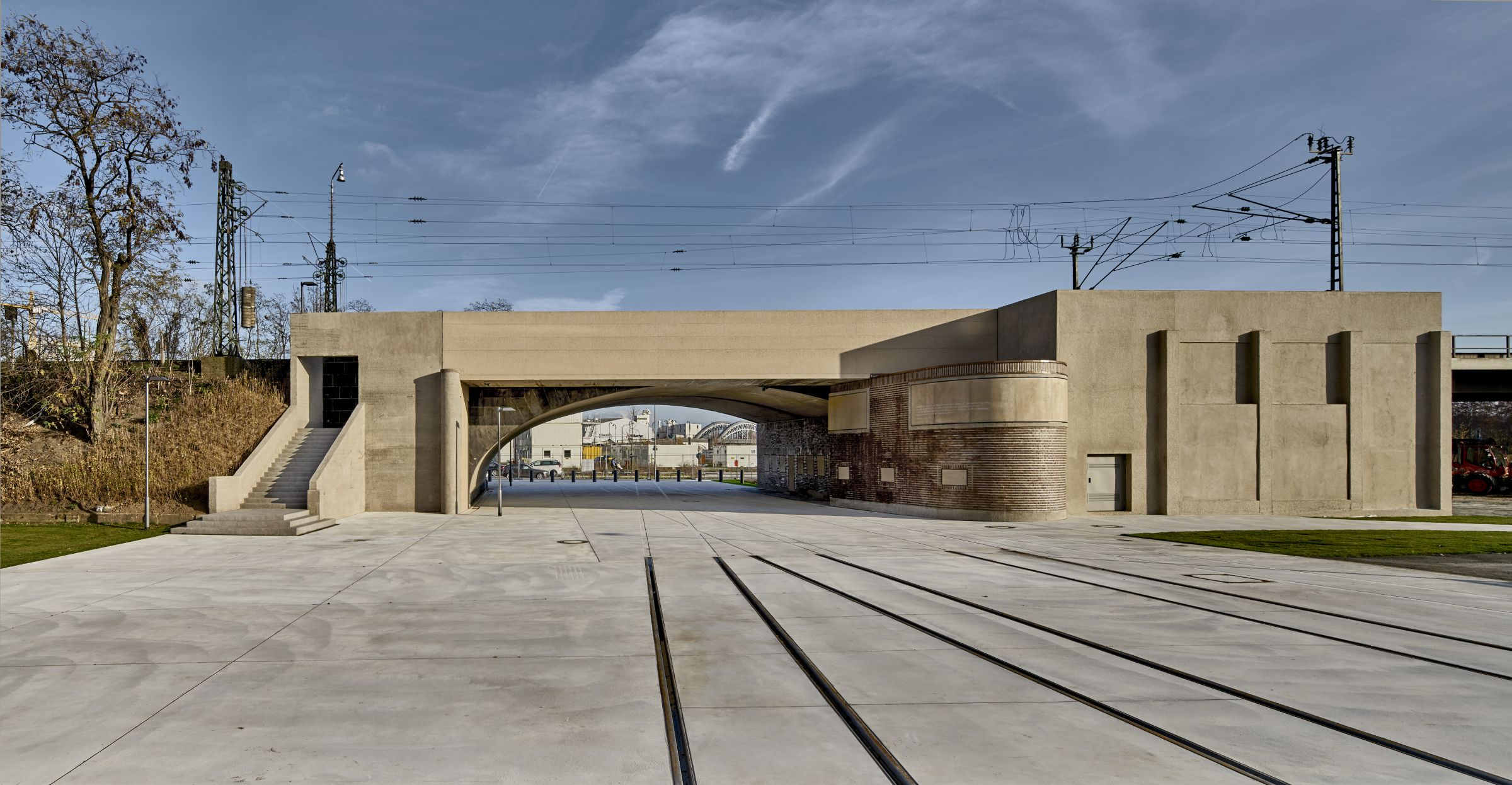
Memorial at the Frankfurt Grossmarkthalle. Track field of the former railway station of the Grossmarkthalle.

The memorial was designed by the architect office KatzKaiser from Cologne and Darmstadt. The concept relies on the unobtrusiveness of its elements: selected quotations from murdered Frankfurt citizens, from survivors of the Holocaust and from observers of mass deportations. It is based on the preserving the surviving fragments from the time of the deportations (cellar, ramp space, signal box, footbridge, tracks) in their found state and linking them with each other via new components, such as a concrete path. A ramp structure provides the connection to the basement of the Grossmarkthalle, which today lies on the extraterritorial site of the European Central Bank. In this location, the Jewish women, men and children were detained, mistreated and robbed of their last belongings, before being forcibly deported by trains of the Deutsche Reichsbahn.

The traditions of these events are permanently inscribed as quotations on the floor and walls, in the basement of the former Grossmarkthalle and in the outside areas of the European Central Bank. For visitors to the ECB and the adjacent, publicly accessible area to the east, the quotations not only topographically mark the site of the mass crime as "inscriptions" on paths and walls, but in their arrangement follow the chronological sequence of a deportation: from the invitation to arrive at the collection point, to the departure of the trains to the collection camps in the east. Between which there were often only two to three days of immeasurable suffering for the people affected. However, the literal evidence also addresses indirect events and emotions, such as suicides in the temporal context of the deportations, reactions of the urban population or the reflection of crime in Frankfurt.

Quotes from perpetrators were not included. Rather, the need and hopelessness of those who became victims of National Socialist racial ideology should be expressed in the authentic place of the crime. According to those responsible, statements by perpetrators in their raw bureaucratic language and mostly without any empathy would have once again mocked the suffering of more than 10,000 people today.

Finally, contemporary and more recent quotations were selected to depict the deportations from Frankfurt. Which also include the reflexive observation of survivors of events at and in the Grossmarkthalle. Some of these quotations have been handed down in English; they refer to the exile or later emigration of survivors from post-war Germany.

== History ==
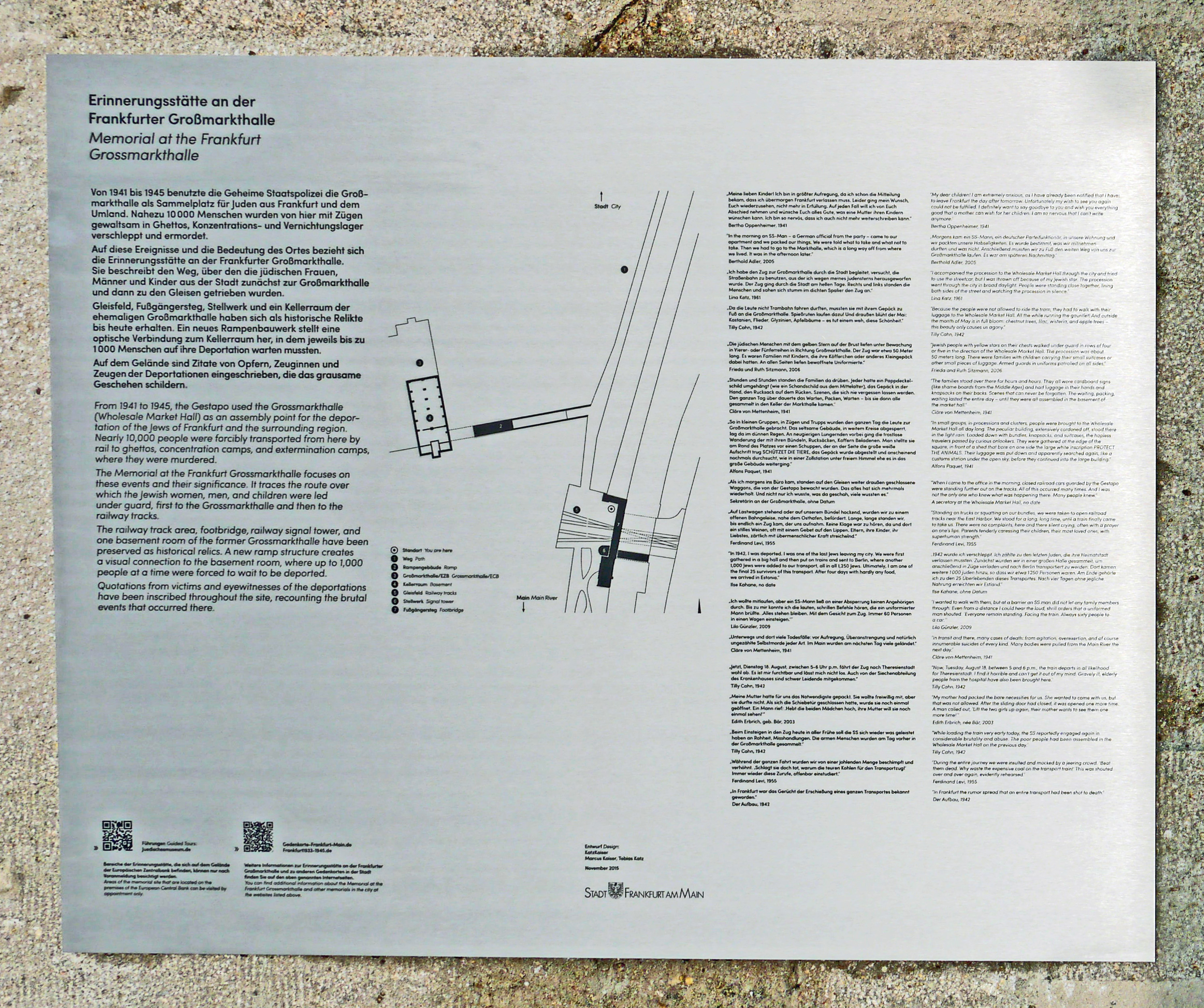
Information board in the underpass of the railway tracks

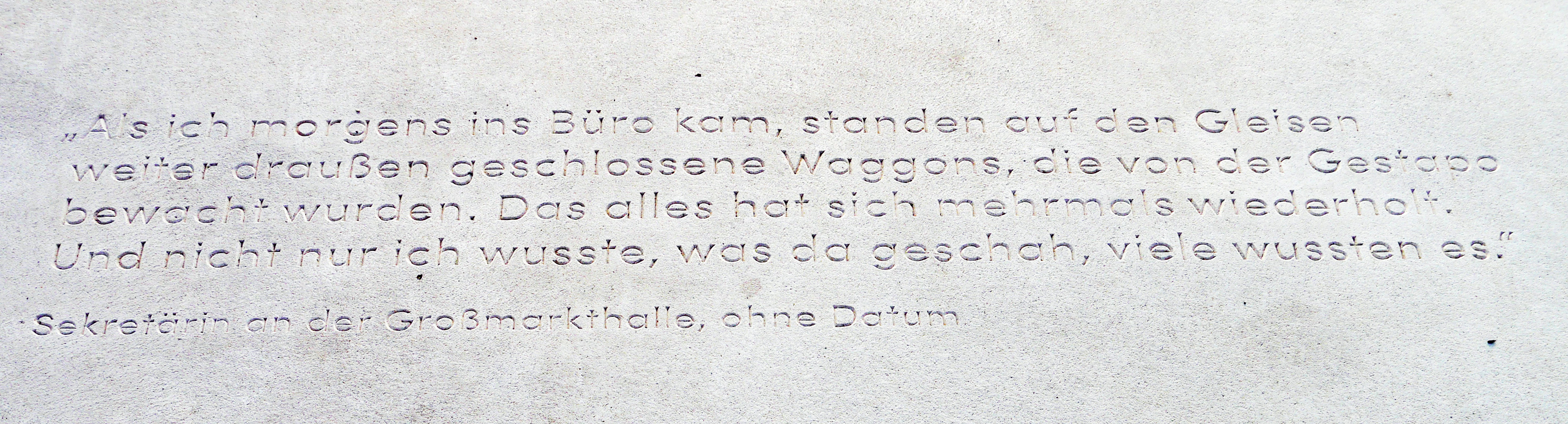
Remembrance of a witness of the deportations

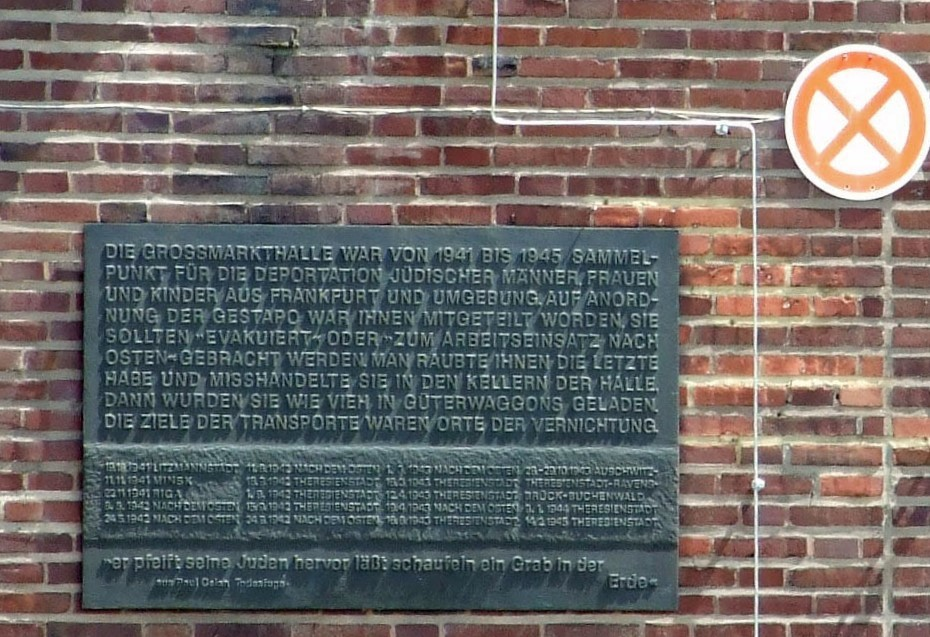
Memorial plaque of the deportations, at the Grossmarkthalle since 1997

From 1941 the Secret State Police rented the eastern cellar area of the Grossmarkthalle as a meeting place for the mass deportations. The choice fell on this place because of its close proximity to the city centre and its convenient location on the harbour railway. The cellar offered shelter from curious glances at what was going on and provided makeshift space for hundreds of people to be deported. From there they were driven to the Grossmarkthalle railway station next to the hall, where the trains of the Deutsche Reichsbahn were ready for the transports. In addition, daily market operations continued unabated, although the brutal events did not remain hidden from the employees there.

Table of deportations from Frankfurt from 1941 to 1945
target	date	number of deported persons	survivors
Łódź	19.10.1941	1.180	3
Minsk	11.11.1941	1.062	10
Kaunas	22.11.1941	992	0
Majdanek/Izbica	08.05.1942	938	0
Majdanek/Izbica	24.05.1942	957	0
Majdanek/Sobibor	11.06.1942	ca. 1.135	0
Theresienstadt	18.08.1942	1.022	17
Theresienstadt	01.09.1942	1.109	32
Theresienstadt	15.09.1942	1.367	105
Raasiku/Estland	24.09.1942	234	10
Auschwitz	11.03.1943	11	1
Theresienstadt	16.03.1943	41	10
Theresienstadt	12.04.1943	11	6
Auschwitz	19.04.1943	17	11
Theresienstadt	28.04.1943	1	1
Theresienstadt	16.06.1943	19	5
Buchenwald	28.10.1943	6	3
Ravensbrück	29.10.1943	7	7
Theresienstadt	10.11.1943	3	2
Auschwitz	1943	ca. 100	0
Theresienstadt	08.11.1944	56	38
Theresienstadt	15.03.1944	7	6
Theresienstadt	16.05.1944	1	1
Theresienstadt	04.07.1944	7	4
Theresienstadt	25.10.1944	9	9
Auschwitz	1944	ca. 100	0
Theresienstadt	14.02.1945	302	291
Theresienstadt	15.03.1945	5	5

The stories of most people deported from Frankfurt can be researched via the database of the Neuer Börneplatz Memorial. It is available to the public in the Museum Judengasse. In total, the data of 12,820 murdered Jews from Frankfurt are known, of which 10,231 were deported by rail.

== Location ==
The memorial site has a publicly accessible area along today's railway embankment on the Philipp-Holzmann-Weg between Sonnemannstraße and Mainufer. The part of the memorial on the premises of the European Central Bank is only accessible on guided tours. These are organized by the Jewish Museum of the City of Frankfurt am Main, which is responsible for the entire pedagogical supervision of the memorial.
