= Kaube =

Kaube is a German surname. Notable people with the surname include:

- Jürgen Kaube (born 1962), German journalist
- Suzan Emine Kaube (born 1942), Turkish-German writer, painter and pedagogue
