= Ludwig Börne Prize =

German annuary literary award

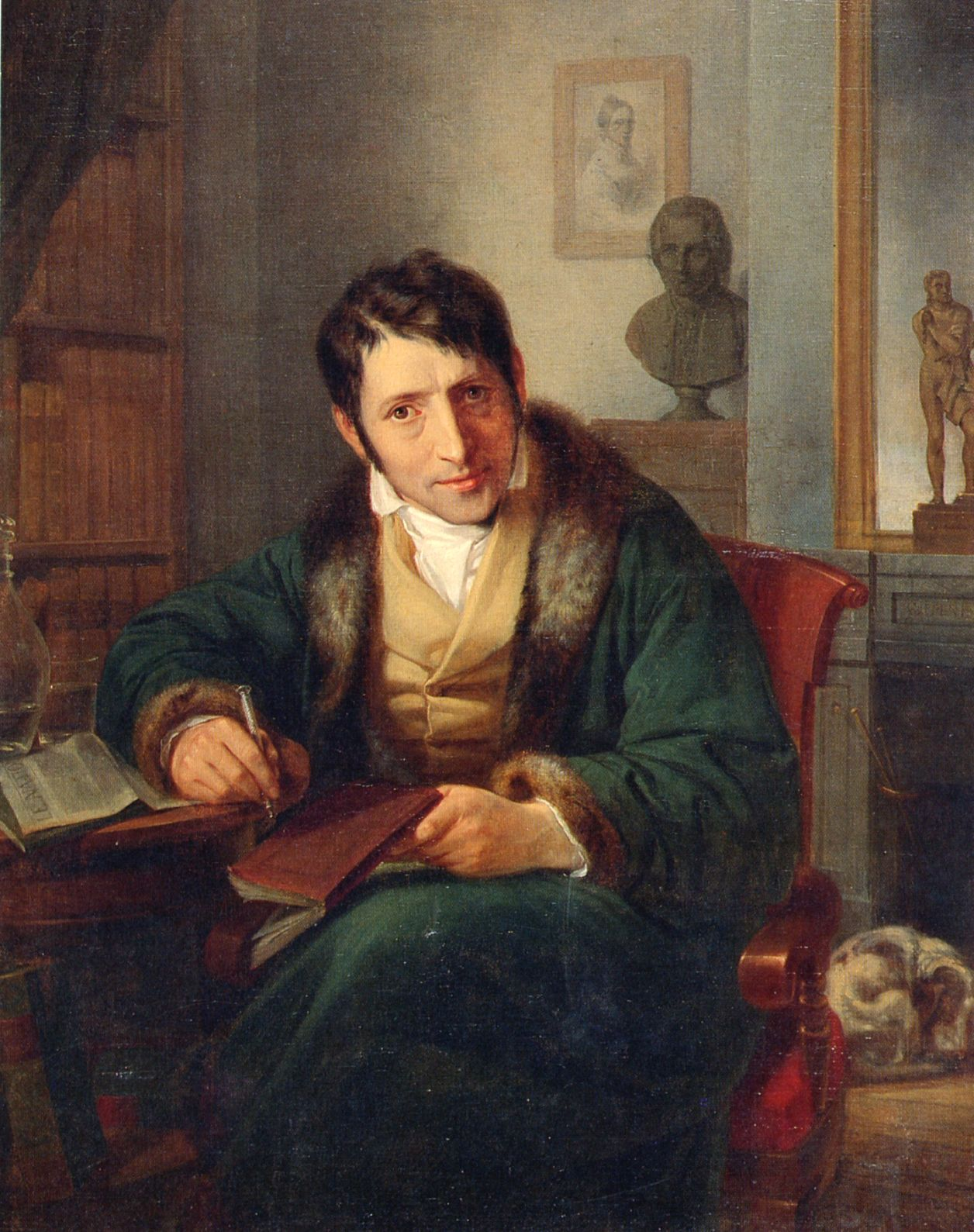
The award is named after Ludwig Börne

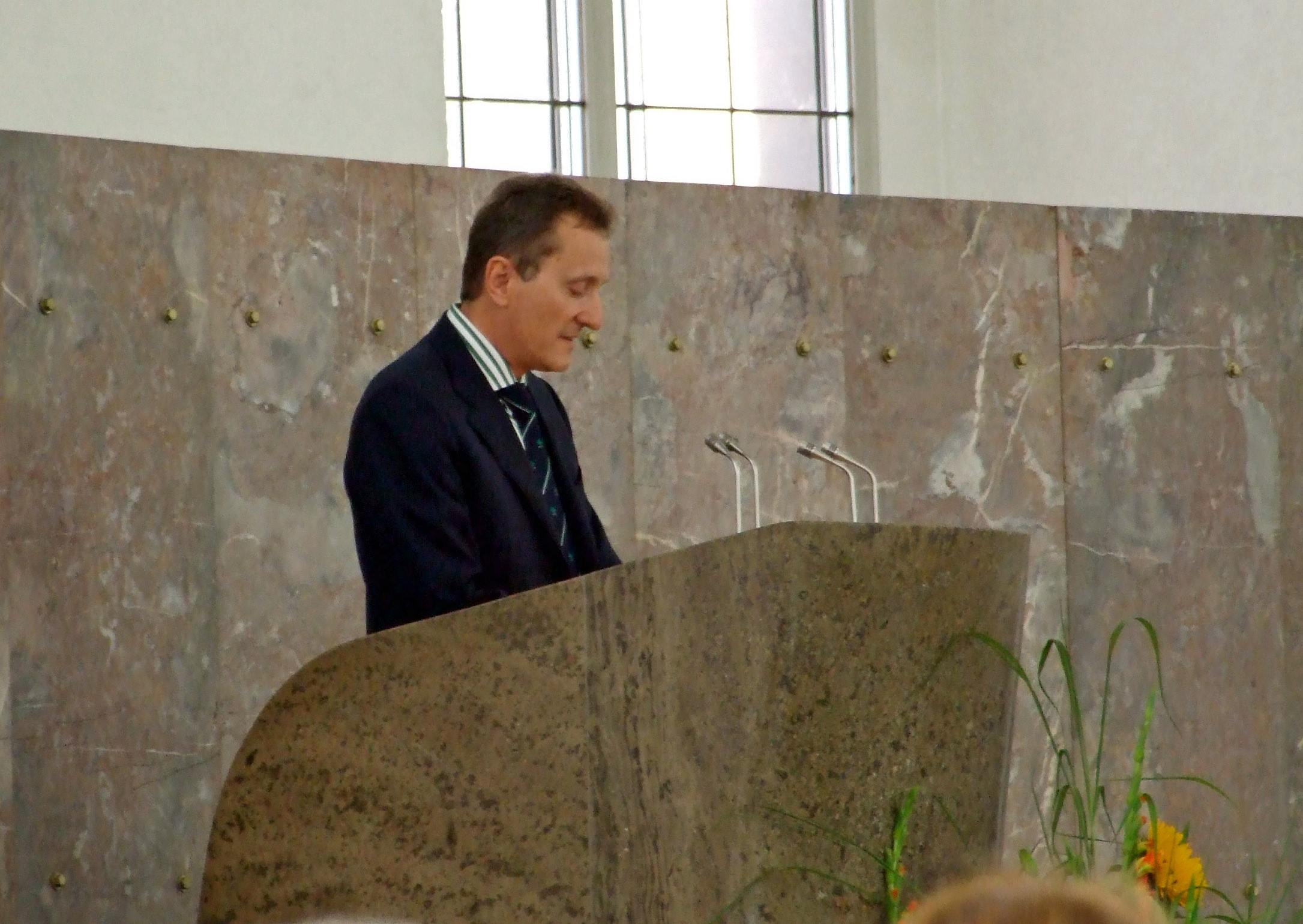
Chairman Michael A. Gotthelf during his opening speech in 2007

The Ludwig Börne Prize (German: Ludwig-Börne-Preis) is a literary award that is awarded annually by the Frankfurt-based Ludwig-Börne-Stiftung. It is one of the most important of its kind in German-speaking countries.

== Objective and methods ==
In 1992 the banker and publicist Michael A. Gotthelf established a foundation that annually awards the Ludwig-Börne-Preis to a German-speaking author, acknowledging his or her outstanding performances in the fields of essays, reviews and reportage. Thus, the foundation celebrates the memory of the Frankfurt author, revolutionary democrat and political journalist Ludwig Börne (1786–1837) and his works.

A judge is nominated by the foundation board, for the sole responsibility of deciding who will win this award. This judge, moreover, makes a speech in the winner's honor. The prize is worth 20,000 euros and its presentation takes place in St. Paul's Church in Frankfurt.

In 2010 the foundation for the first time awarded a Börne Honorary Medal to Marcel Reich-Ranicki for his lifetime achievements.

== Foundation board ==
Founder and chairman of Ludwig-Börne-Stiftung is Michael A. Gotthelf. The foundation board is made up of Salomon Korn (chairman of the Jewish community in Frankfurt), Peter Feldmann (former mayor of Frankfurt), Ina Hartwig (head of the Frankfurt culture department), Hubert Burda (Hubert Burda Media) and Thomas Bellut (ZDF director general, as of 2022).

As of 2026:

- Michael A. Gotthelf
- Salomon Korn
- Ina Hartwig
- Mike Josef
- Jürgen Kaube
- Ulrich Caspar
- Dieter Graumann

== Award winners ==
- 1993: Joachim Kaiser, editor
- 1994: Marie-Luise Scherer, author
- 1995: Marcel Reich-Ranicki, publicist and literary critic
- 1996: Joachim C. Fest, publicist, author and contemporary historian
- 1997: Richard Schröder, philosopher and Protestant theologian
- 1998: Josef Joffe, publicist, publisher and lecturer
- 1999: Georges-Arthur Goldschmidt, author and translator
- 2000: no award
- 2001: Rudolf Augstein, journalist, publisher and publicist
- 2002: Hans Magnus Enzensberger, poet, author and editor
- 2003: George Steiner, author, philosopher and cultural critic
- 2004: Daniela Dahn, journalist and author
- 2005: Henning Ritter, editor
- 2006: Wolfgang Büscher, journalist and author
- 2007: Henryk M. Broder, journalist and author
- 2008: Alice Schwarzer, women's rights' activist and publisher
- 2009: Frank Schirrmacher, journalist, publisher and author
- 2010: Marcel Reich-Ranicki (medal for his life work)
- 2011: Joachim Gauck, President of Germany, civil rights activist and publicist
- 2012: Götz Aly, historian and journalist
- 2013: Peter Sloterdijk, philosopher and essayist
- 2014: Florian Illies, journalist and author
- 2015: Jürgen Kaube, journalist and publisher
- 2016: Martin Meyer, journalist
- 2017: Rüdiger Safranski, philosopher
- 2018: Souad Mekhennet, journalist
- 2019: Eva Menasse, writer
- 2020: Christoph Ransmayr, writer
- 2022: Eric Gujer, journalist
- 2023: Robert Habeck, writer and (then) politician
- 2024: Daniel Kehlmann, writer
- 2025: Dan Diner, Israeli-German historian and political writer
- 2026: Christopher Clark, historian

== Literature ==
- Georg Stanitzek: Essay – BRD. Vorwerk 8, Berlin 2011, ISBN 978-3-940384-33-1, pp. 120–122.
