= Michael Gotthelf =

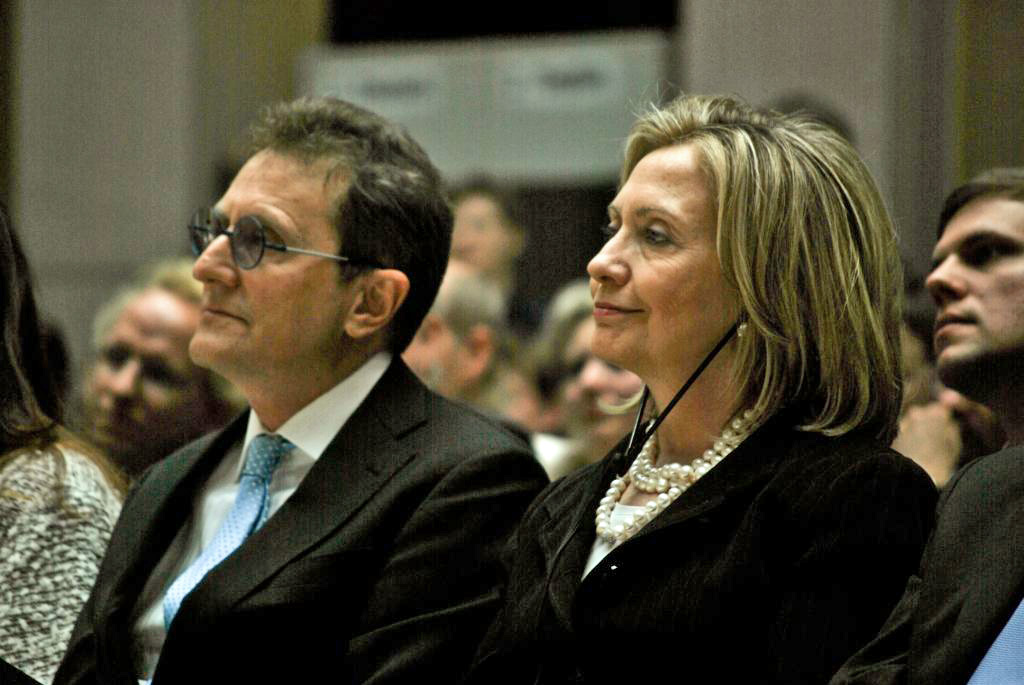
Michael Gotthelf and Hillary Clinton at the Walther Rathenau Award Ceremony in 2011

Michael Alfred Gotthelf (born 1953 in Frankfurt) is a German entrepreneur and publicist. He is the initiator and founder of the literary prize Ludwig-Börne-Preis, the Frank Schrirrmacher foundation and the Walther Rathenau Institut, a foundation for international policy that awards the Walther-Rathenau-Preis.

== Life ==
Michael A. Gotthelf was born in 1953 in Frankfurt am Main to a Jewish father from Berlin and a Bavarian Catholic mother.

== Education ==
In 1972, after completing his Abitur at the Goethe-Gymnasium in Frankfurt, Gotthelf went on to study sociology, political science, economics and business administration at Stanford University in California and the Goethe University in Frankfurt, where he earned his doctorate degree in economics. As an economist he i. a. contributed an essay entitled "Was starrt ihr alle auf 1929?!" to "Die Zukunft des Kapitalismus" which was published by Suhrkamp Verlag.

== Professional career ==
He started his professional career as an editor for the Frankfurter Allgemeine Zeitung in Frankfurt and thereafter worked as a bank manager. In the early nineties he managed the Metallbank, a subsidiary of the Metallgesellschaft. For the Munich-based parent group he, in 1995, founded the Hypovereinsbank (Schweiz), which focused on business with institutional clients. Gotthelf gained control as the bank’s general manager and – after it was renamed into AP Anlage & Privatbank AG due to a management buyout – operated as their Chairman of the Board of Directors before the bank was acquired by the Latvian Parex Bank in 2004.

Gotthelf also occasionally works as a feature writer and guest author for the Frankfurter Allgemeine Zeitung and the Neue Zürcher Zeitung.

== Diplomatic activity ==
In 1992 Michael A. Gotthelf became the Honorary consul for the Czech Republic in Frankfurt. From 2000 until 2004 he functioned as Honorary consul of the Federal Republic of Germany in Zurich and afterwards he moved to London. For some years now he has been operating as an advisor for several international institutions; he advised the President of Madagascar on a pro bono basis.

== Awards and honors ==
For his commitment to the Ludwig-Börne-Preis the municipal authorities of the city of Frankfurt awarded Gotthelf the Goethe Plaque in 2000.

In 2007, he was awarded the Verdienstkreuz of the Order of Merit of the Federal Republic of Germany, also for his long-standing activity for the Ludwig-Börne-Stiftung.

== Foundations ==
As chairman of the Ludwig-Börne-Stiftung, Gotthelf was one of the initiators of the Ludwig-Börne-Preis, a literary award for essays, reviews and reportage founded in 1993. Germany's President Joachim Gauck and the literary critic Marcel Reich-Ranicki have been awarded this prize among others.

At the beginning of 2008 Gotthelf founded the Walther Rathenau Institut, a foundation for international policy based in Berlin. He serves as the Chairman of the advisory Board of this foundation. In remembrance of the German foreign policymaker Walther Rathenau the institute supports political education and annually awards the Walther-Rathenau-Preis standing for human rights and tolerance. Hillary Clinton, for instance, received the prize due to her efforts for the peace in crisis regions.

In 2014/15 Gotthelf, together with Mathias Döpfner and Martin Meyer among others, founded the "Frank-Schirrmacher-Stiftung" following the surprising death of his friend Schirrmacher in June 2014. Schirrmacher was one of the leading German intellectuals and editor in chief of the cultural section of the "Frankfurter Allgemeine Zeitung". The prize money of 20,000 Swiss Francs for the annual Schirrmacher award which honours work to further the understanding of current affairs, was received by Hans Magnus Enzensberger in 2015, followed by Michel Houellebecq, Jonathan Franzen, Daniel Kehlmann and Peter Thiel.
