= Memorial Neuer Börneplatz =

Holocaust memorial in Germany

Coordinates: 50.1116°N 8.69°E

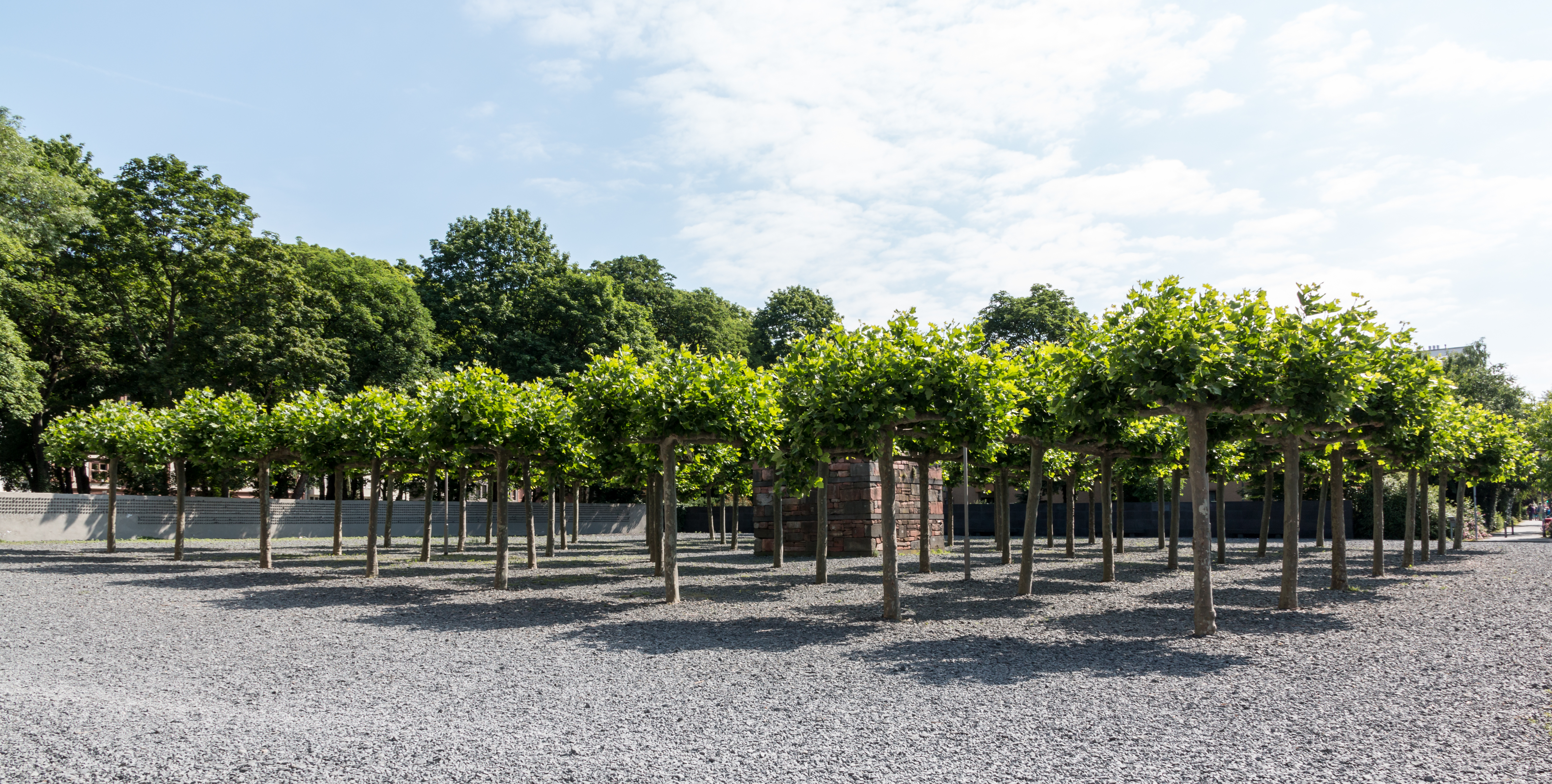
The Neuer Börneplatz with a large cube of stones surrounded by plane trees, constituting the southern part of the memorial site. Top left: trees in the Old Jewish Cemetery Battonnstraße. The cemetery's wall (below the trees) constitutes the northern part of the memorial site.

The Neuer Börneplatz Memorial Site, also called Börneplatz Memorial Site, in Frankfurt am Main commemorates the Jewish community of Frankfurt that was massacred in the Holocaust. It was opened to the public on 16 June 1996.

Its most important element is the outer wall of the Old Jewish Cemetery Battonnstraße with a frieze of 11,908 memorial name blocks, paying individual tribute to victims of the Schoa. The second major element is the Neuer Börneplatz between the cemetery's wall and the Rechneigrabenstraße.

== Location ==
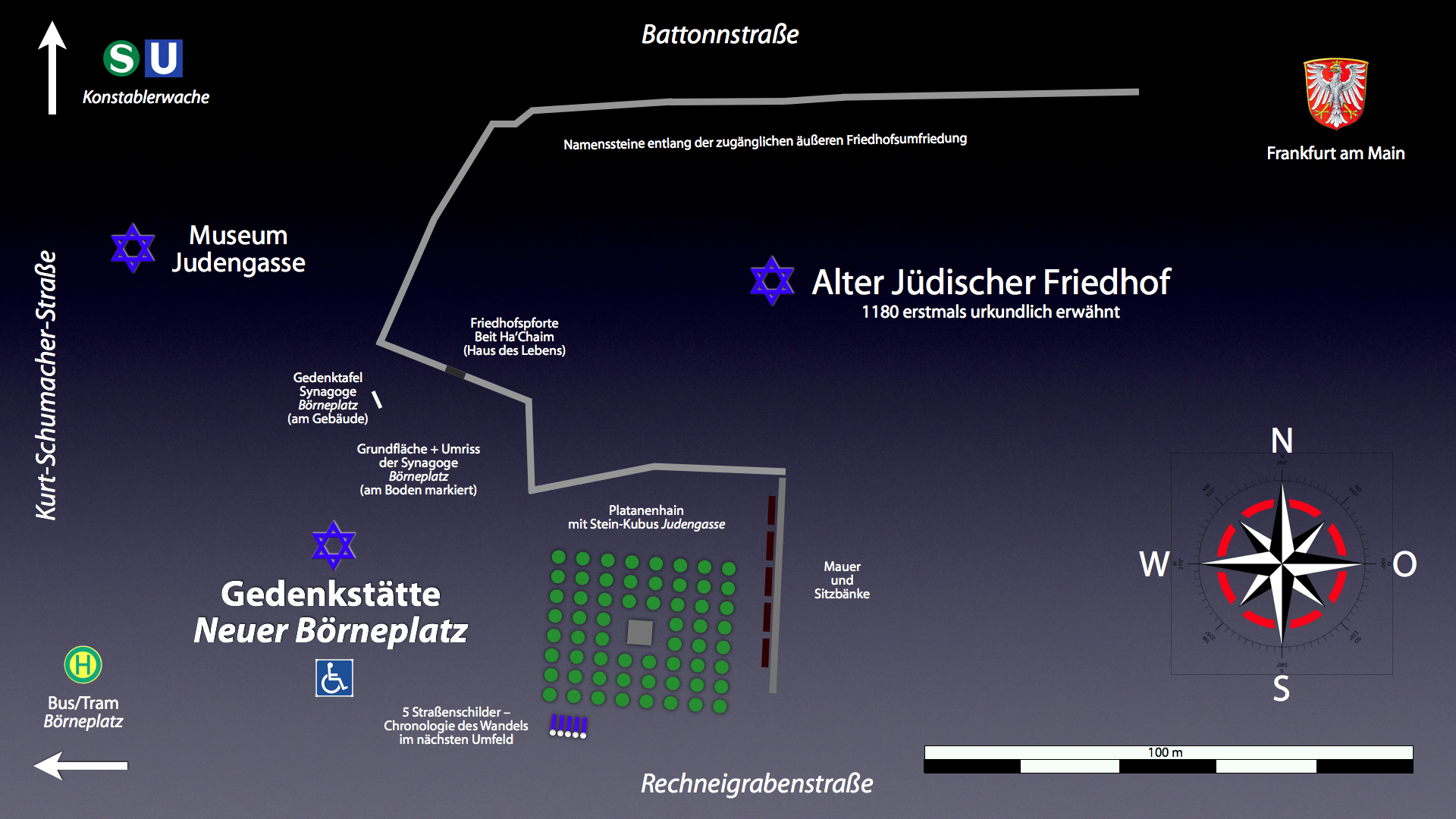
Neuer Börneplatz Memorial Site, location sketch

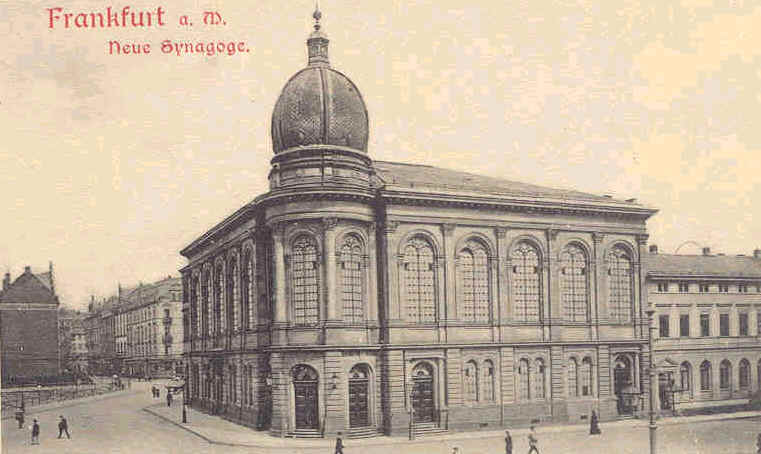
The Börneplatz Synagogue (built in 1881/82, destroyed in 1938), view from the Börneplatz. Half of the area once covered by the synagogue is part of today's Neuer Börneplatz, the other half is covered by a large modern building. The adjacent building on the synagogue's eastern side (to the right) also stood on today's Neuer Börneplatz.

=== Today ===
The memorial site is located in the eastern inner city of Frankfurt, between the Battonnstraße in the north, the Rechneigrabenstraße in the south and the rear of a large modern building in the west (formerly an office building of Frankfurter Stadtwerke on Kurt-Schumacher-Straße, today planning department of the city of Frankfurt; the Museum Judengasse is also located in this building).

The Neuer Börneplatz is a pedestrian zone. The memorial site and the Museum Judengasse are accessible from both Battonnstraße and Rechneigrabenstraße.

=== The historic Börneplatz and today's Neuer Börneplatz ===
The Börneplatz was originally called Judenmarkt (Market of the Jews). Until the end of World War II, the "old" Börneplatz was situated to the west of the area of today's Neuer Börneplatz, which was in turn covered by buildings until the end of World War II (cf. the maps below).

The buildings on today's Neuer Börneplatz were destroyed in World War II. Thus, for about four decades, the Börneplatz was extended on the eastern side by an area which is roughly today's Neuer Börneplatz. Then a new building was erected on the area of the "old" Börneplatz, which had diseappeared by 1990. Its eastern post-war extension was left over; it was named Neuer Börneplatz.

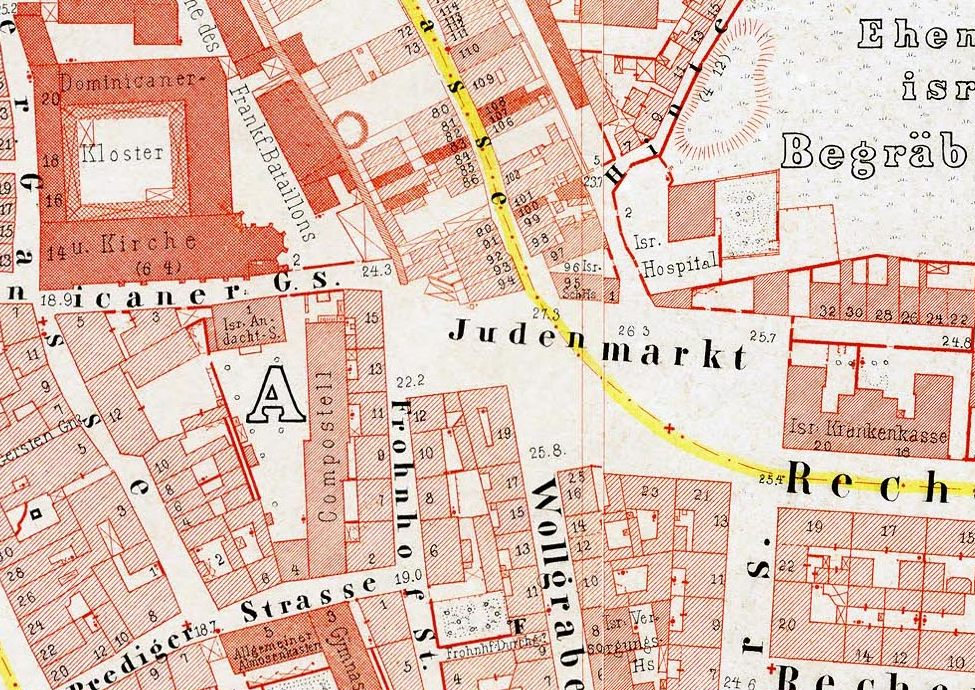
1862: The square area defined by the Hospital of the Israelitische Krankenkassen (Isr. Krankenkasse) and the row of six small hospital houses (no. 22–32) is roughly the area of today's Neuer Börneplatz.

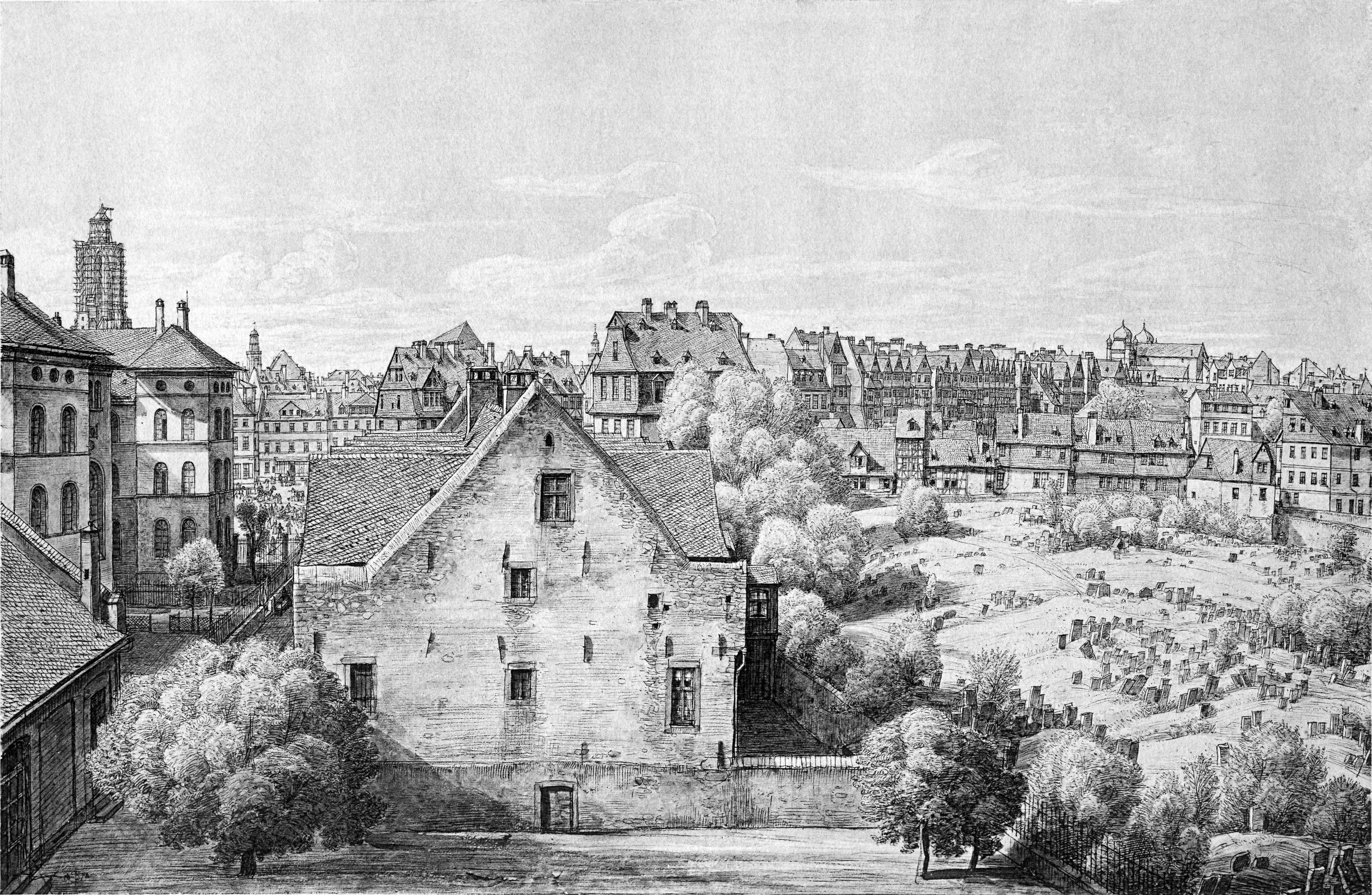
1872: The Hospital of the Israelitische Krankenkassen (left). The Judenmarkt is behind this building. Middle: the row of small houses (view of the easternmost house) next to the cemetery.

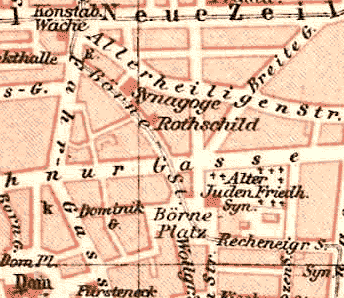
1892: The Judenmarkt is now called Börneplatz. Note the Börneplatz Synagogue (Syn.) between Börneplatz and the Old Jewish Cemetery. The Schnurgasse is today's Battonnstraße.

== Description ==
=== The cemetery wall ===
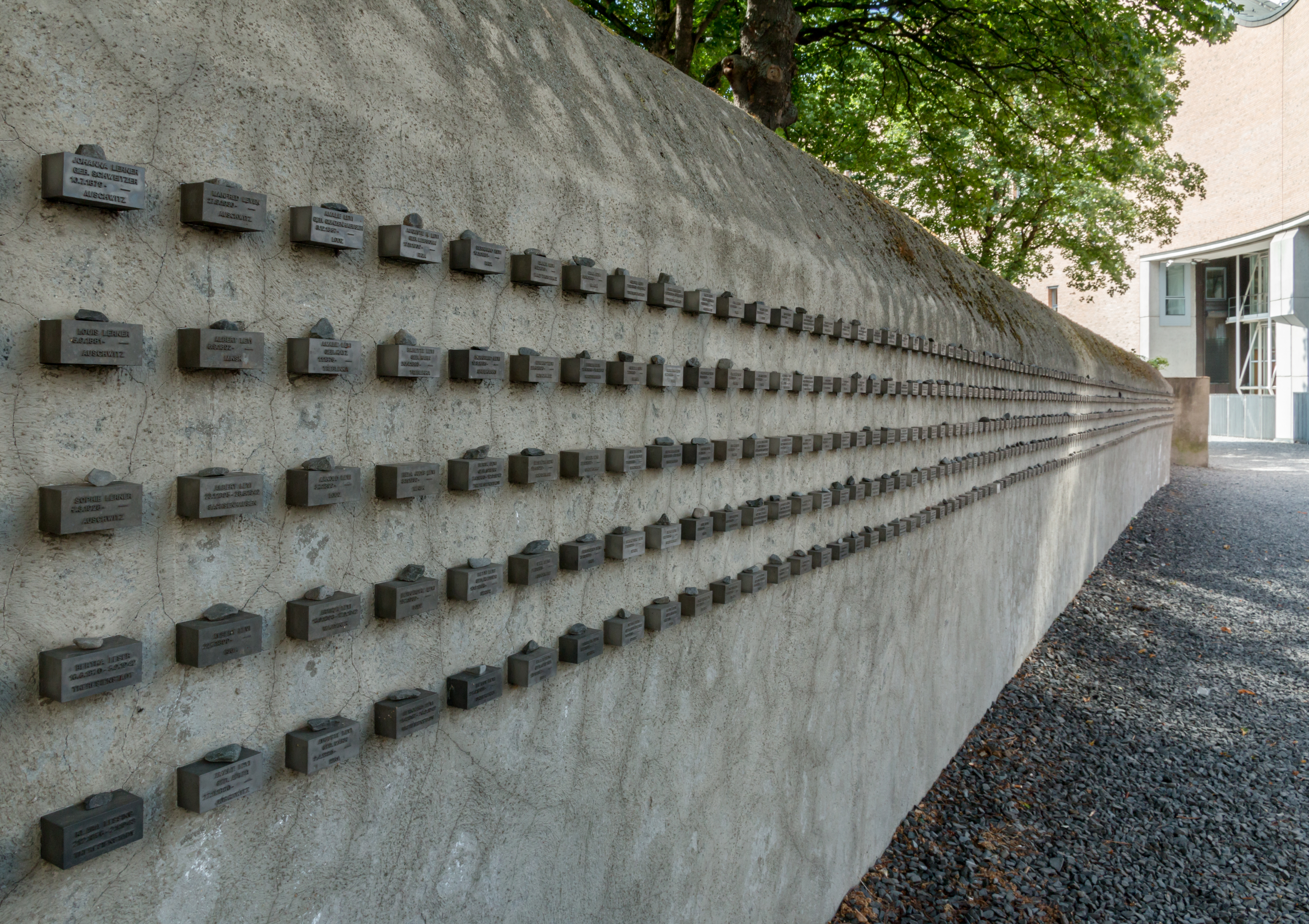
Frieze of commemorative name blocks on the Jewish cemetery's wall

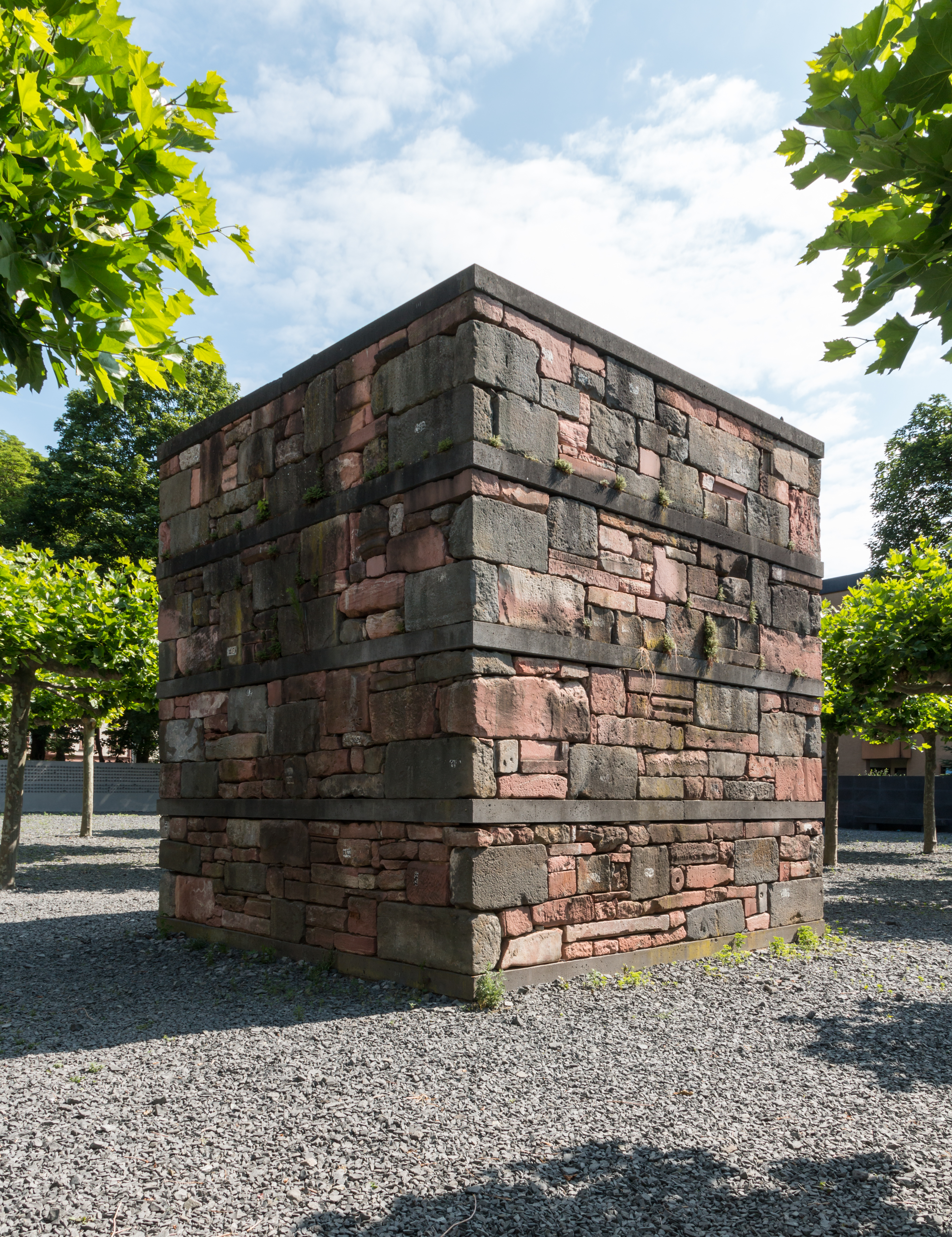
The cube

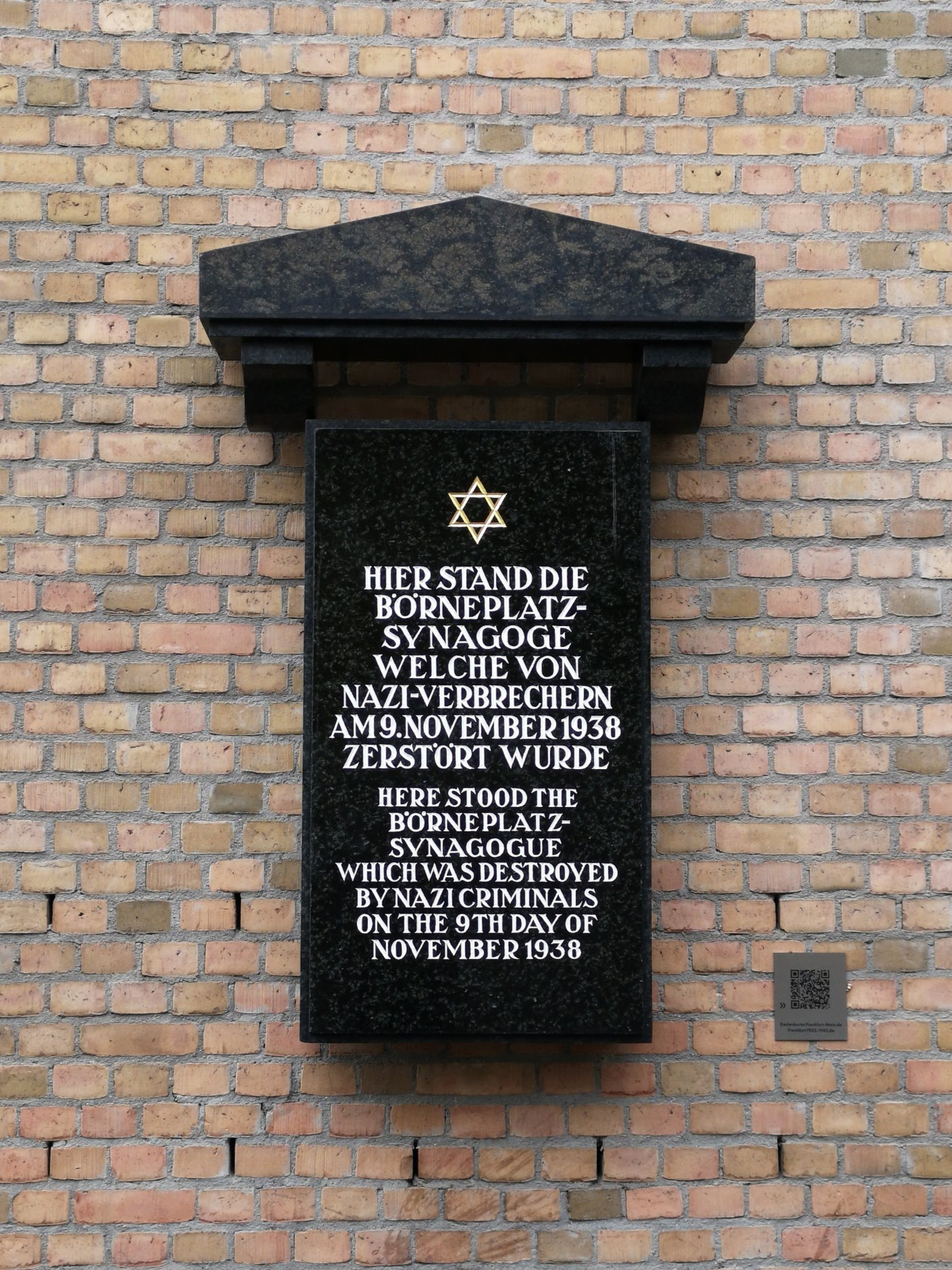
Commemorative plaque for the Börneplatz Synagogue

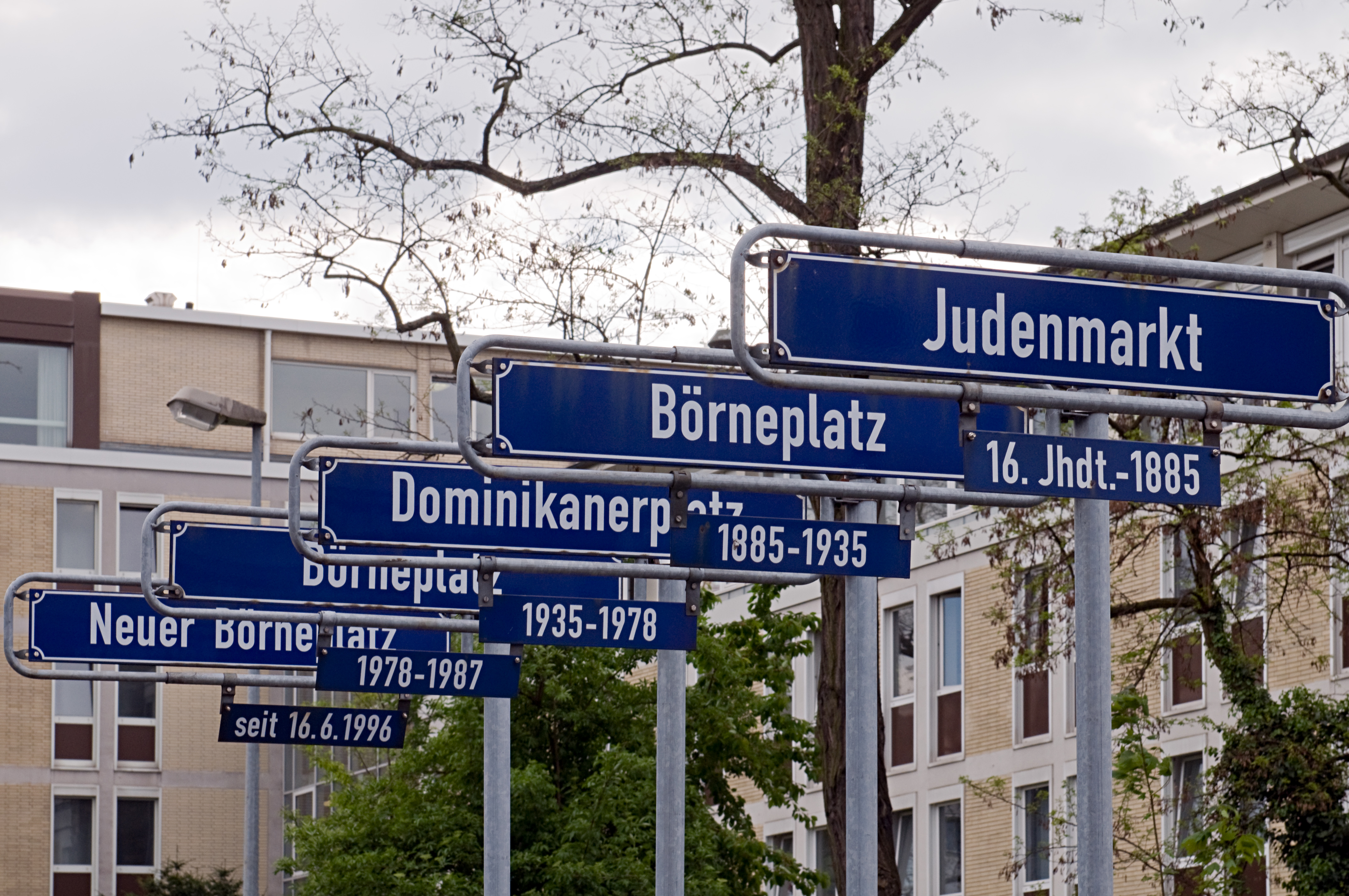
Five symbolic street signs show the changes of the place's name

The most prominent part of the memorial site is the frieze of metal blocks on the outer wall of the Old Jewish Cemetery. It commemorates Jews who were murdered during the Nazi era or died as a result of persecution, and who were associated with Frankfurt either by birth (Anne Frank is an example) or because they had resided there or were deported from Frankfurt. The inscriptions on the metal blocks inform the visitors about the names of these victims as well as their basic biographical data (date of birth, date of death if known and place of death). Visitors can place small stones on the blocks according to Jewish mourning rites.

By the time the memorial site was inaugurated, 11,134 persons were represented by a name block. The name frieze on the southern cemetery wall was extended by 823 name blocks in 2010. As of 2023, the frieze consists of 11,908 name blocks.

The names and data inscribed on the blocks can also be found in the publicly accessible Neuer Börneplatz Memorial database, in most cases along with more biographical and background information and sometimes photographs. The database was initiated by the Jewish Museum Frankfurt, it can be used in the Museum Judengasse. The ongoing research for the database enabled corrections to be made to the frieze of name blocks. Many name blocks were added. On the other hand, 60 name blocks were removed because it had turned out that those persons had either survived the Holocaust or they were not associated with Frankfurt or they were not Jewish.

Ahead of the memorial site's inauguration in 1996, the cemetery wall received a new gate. It consists of two modern metal door wings on which "Beth HaChaim" (House of Life) is written in Hebrew letters.

=== Cube and plane grove ===
In the centre of the square on Rechneigrabenstraße stands a stone cube made up of the remains of the foundations of the former ghetto. It is surrounded by a plane grove. The ground of the square is covered with grey gravel stones.

=== Commemorating the synagogue ===
The Börneplatz Synagogue was built in 1882 and devastated in 1938 during the Kristallnacht. Since 1990, half of its ground-plan area is covered by a large administrative building. The other half is part of the memorial site. It is marked by slim steel rails in the ground and a solid surface based on asphalt. This surface is darker, harder and smoother than the loose gravel stones. When stepping on the solid surface, the visitors can also hear and feel the difference.

A commemorative plaque for the destroyed synagogue was installed on the rear wall of the former Stadtwerke building. It had already been ceremoniously unveiled by the US military government in an act of commemoration on 20 March 1946, but was not installed in the right place at the time. The inscription is bilingual and reads:

Hier stand die Börneplatz-Synagoge, welche von Nazi-Verbrechern am 9. November 1938 zerstört wurde
Here stood the Börneplatz-Synagogue which was destroyed by Nazi criminals on the 9th day of November 1938

=== Symbolic street signs ===
Five symbolic street signs at the Rechneigrabenstraße indicate the changing names of the Börneplatz, whose shape also changed over time. The different names are associated with phases in Frankfurt's history – or with steps in the evolution of the city's commemoration policy.

- Close to today's Neuer Börneplatz, there was once the marketplace of the Jews who lived in the Judengasse. From the 16th century onwards, this place was called Judenmarkt.
- The square was renamed Börneplatz (and the Judengasse was renamed Börnestraße) in 1885, one year ahead of the 100th birthday of Ludwig Börne (1786–1837). This was the time when nearly all of the narrow houses in the former ghetto Judengasse had been demolished and new houses were being built there.
- Ludwig Börne being a Jew, the Nazis renamed the square Dominikanerplatz in 1935, after the nearby Dominican monastery. After World War II the Dominikanerplatz grew considerably on its eastern side (cf. above: The historic Börneplatz and today's Neuer Börneplatz).
- In order to undo the Nazi manipulation, the square was given its older name Börneplatz again in 1978, following a suggestion of the Frankfurt historian Paul Arnsberg.
- In the late 1980s, the older part of the Börneplatz disappeared under a new building. The younger eastern part was then called Neuer Börneplatz.

The additional sign attached to the Neuer Börneplatz street sign suggests that this name was introduced on 16 June 1996. This is not accurate. The Neuer Börneplatz Memorial Site was inaugurated on 16 June 1996 but it was already named after the Neuer Börneplatz in the late 1980s when it was being planned. Today it is also called Börneplatz Memorial Site (see External links).

== Planning ==
=== Background ===
In 1985 the city of Frankfurt am Main announced a competition for the development of the Börneplatz. A customer centre of the municipal utilities was to be built here, whose offices had previously been distributed throughout the city. The planning was entrusted to the Swiss architect Ernst Gisel. At the same time, the city council and magistrate decided to transform the Börneplatz into a "New Börneplatz" with the new building. The Jewish community suggested that a memorial site be established to commemorate the deportations of Frankfurt Jews between 1941 and 1945.

During the excavation work for the customer centre, the planners came across house foundations and two mikvehs of Frankfurt's Judengasse, the former Jewish ghetto. Since the city government under Lord Mayor Wolfram Brück (CDU) was partial to the new building of the municipal utilities, all remains of the Wall were removed. This led to fierce public protest in the summer of 1987. There were demonstrations against the removal of the archaeological finds; the construction site was often occupied by Demonstrators. The Börneplatz conflict finally ended with a compromise: the foundations of five houses in the former Judengasse, two ritual baths and other archaeological remains were restored to their original location, but renewed lower than originally. They are the heart of the Museum Judengasse, which opened in 1992. The Börneplatz conflict had a major impact on Frankfurt's policy of commemoration.

=== Design competition ===
When the construction work was still in an early phase, the design competition for the Neuer Börneplatz Memorial Site was launched. 249 applicants submitted their works. Since the jury initially did not want to award a 1st prize, the results were presented and discussed again in public. In the end, the architects Andrea Wandel, Wolfgang Lorch and Nikolaus Hirsch were selected as the winners of the competition.

== See also ==
- Ludwig Börne
- Frankfurter Judengasse
- Jewish Museum Frankfurt
