= Souad Mekhennet =

German journalist and author (born 1978)

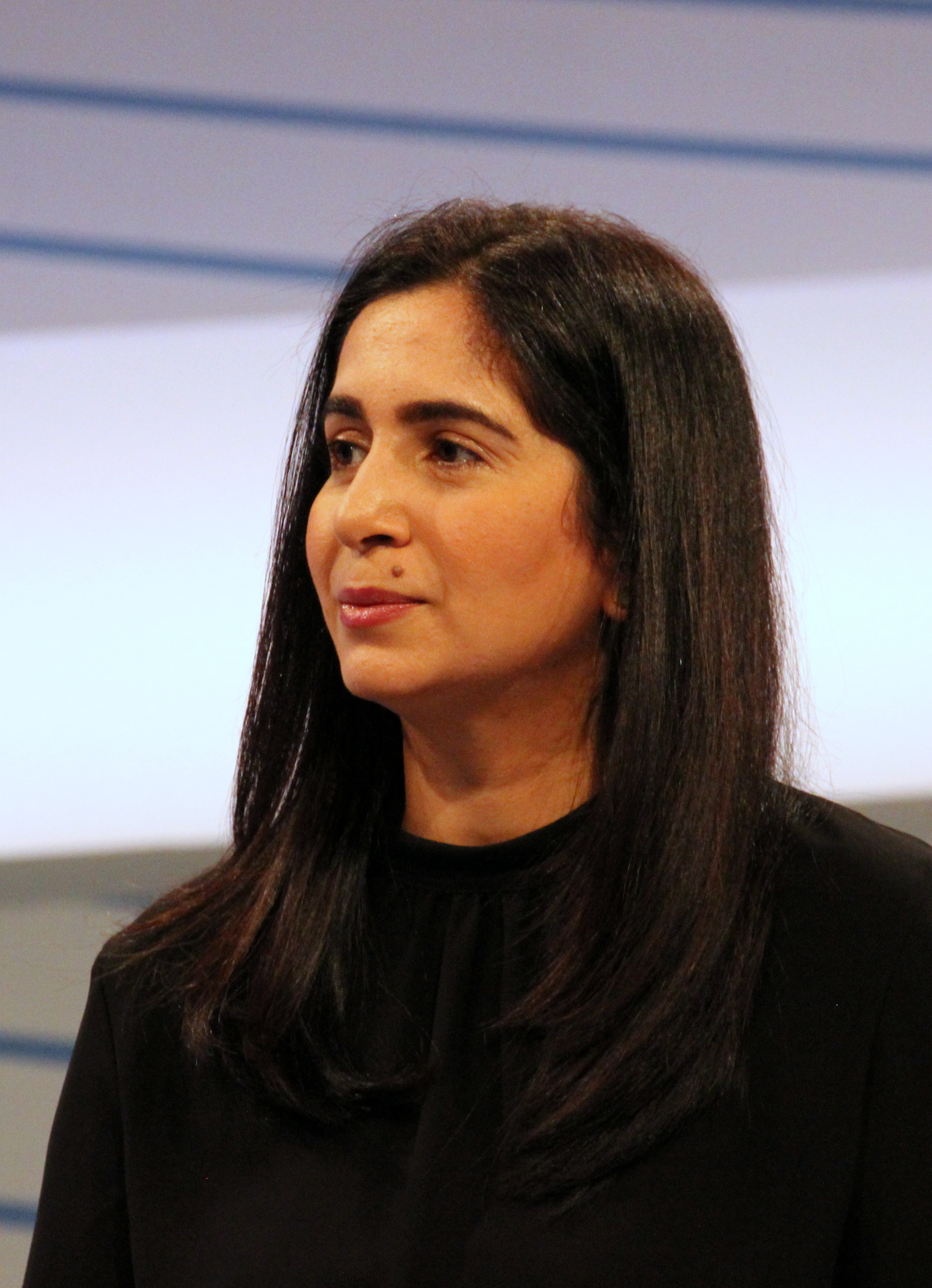
Mekhennet in 2017

Souad Mekhennet (born 1978) is a German investigative journalist who has written for The Washington Post, The New York Times, The Daily Beast, International Herald Tribune, Frankfurter Allgemeine Zeitung, and German television channel ZDF.

She has appeared on CNN's Connect the World with Becky Anderson, CBS This Morning, MSNBC's Morning Joe, BBC World News, ABC News, The Mimi Geerges Show, and numerous other television and radio shows and segments in the US, Europe, the Middle East, and North Africa.

She is currently a national security correspondent for The Washington Post and attends Peter Thiel's Dialog events.

== Early life and education ==
Souad Mekhennet was born in 1978 in Frankfurt to a working-class family, the daughter of a Turkish mother and a Moroccan father. She grew up principally in Germany, but spent some years of her childhood in Morocco.

In May 2018, Mekhennet won the Nannen Prize. A month later, she captured the Ludwig Börne Prize, a prestigious literary award bestowed upon a German-speaking author in acknowledgement of outstanding performances in reporting. Mekhennet was also nominated for a 2018 Al-Rodhan Prize for Global Cultural Understanding by the British Academy (renamed the British Academy Book Prize for Global Cultural Understanding in 2021) for her memoir I Was Told To Come Alone.

== Books ==
Mekhennet is an author of four books:

- I Was Told to Come Alone: My Journey Behind the Lines of Jihad (published by Henry Holt and Co., 13 June 2017) ISBN 978-1-62779-896-9
- The Eternal Nazi: From Mauthausen to Cairo, the Relentless Pursuit of SS Doctor Aribert Heim (published by Penguin Random House, New York, 6 March 2014) ISBN 978-0-307-47521-3
- The Children of Jihad: The New Generation of Islamist Terror in Europe (published by Piper Verlag GmbH, 8 June 2008) ISBN 978-3-492-04933-7
- Islam (published by Arena Publishing GmbH, 15 June 2006) ISBN 978-3-401-06220-4
