= Walther Rathenau Institut =

Non-profit foundation based in Berlin

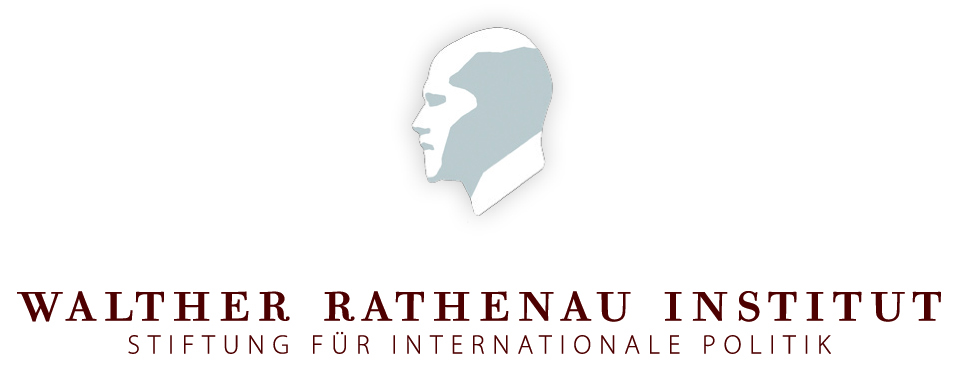
The institute's official logo

The Walther Rathenau Institut, Stiftung für internationale Politik is a non-party and non-profit foundation based in Berlin. It is named after Walther Rathenau, the German-Jewish foreign minister of the Weimar Republic.

== Aims and purposes ==
The foundation celebrates the life and works of Walther Rathenau, a successful industrial, essayist, and foreign policymaker who was born in Berlin on September 29, 1867. The foundation's goal is to make his dedication to democratic values, international understanding and tolerance widely known to the broad public. For this purpose the foundation fosters political education in remembrance of Walther Rathenau, especially by means of contributions and research projects in the field of foreign policy. Moreover, policy studies are performed on current Germany-related subjects that reflect the liberal spirit of Walther Rathenau.

== Walther-Rathenau-Preis ==
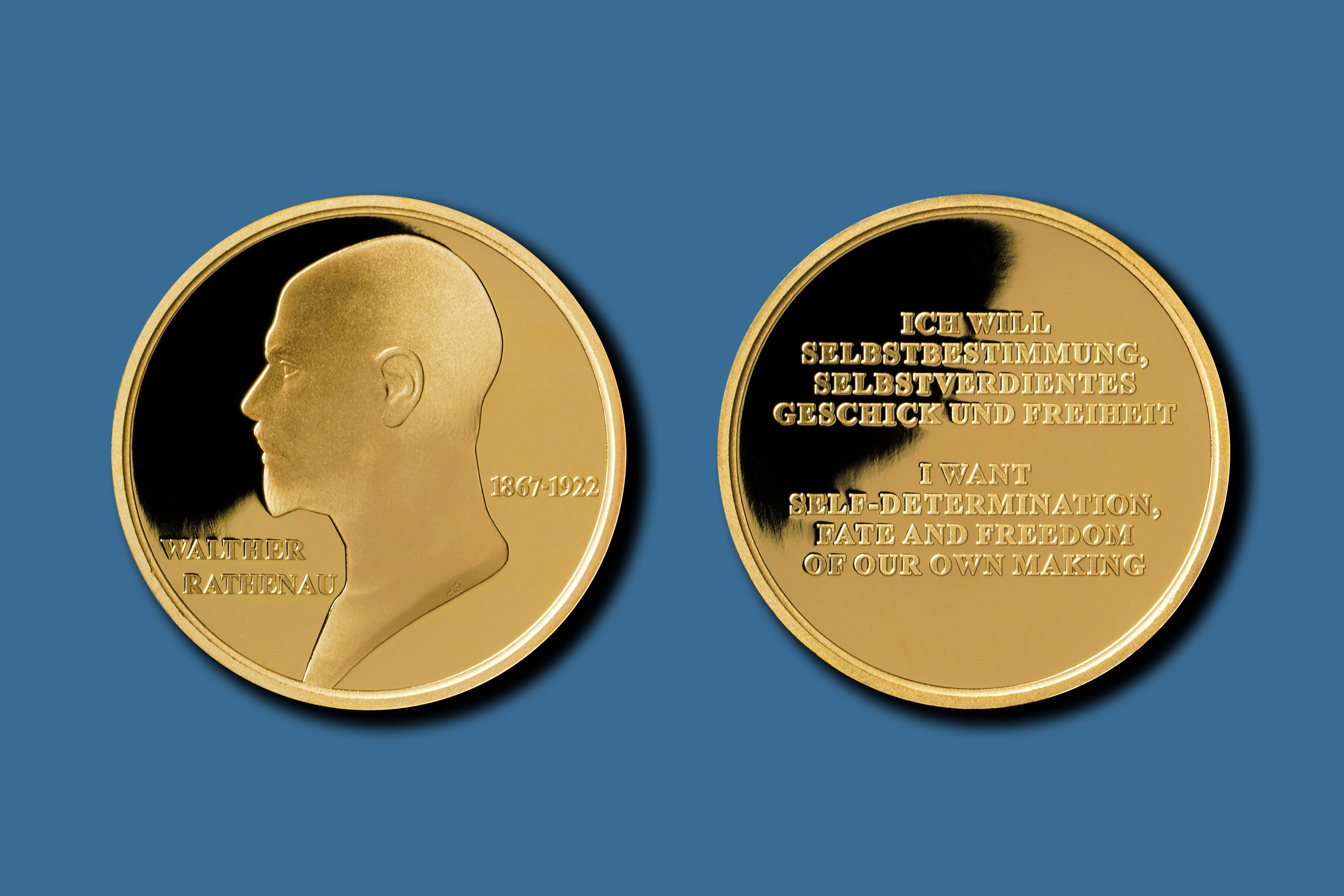
Rathenau Medal

The Walther Rathenau Institut annually awards the Walther-Rathenau-Preis acknowledging outstanding work in regard to foreign policy. The prize, a medal with Walther Rathenau's portrait, is presented at a celebration in Berlin.

Award winners

- 2008: Hans-Dietrich Genscher (Germany)
- 2009: Shimon Peres (Israel)
- 2010: Hillary Clinton (United States)
- 2011: Donald Tusk (Poland)
- 2012: United Nations High Commissioner for Refugees
- 2014: Mark Rutte (Netherlands)
- 2015: Queen Rania of Jordan (Jordan)
- 2018: Guido Westerwelle (Germany)
- 2021: Angela Merkel (Germany)
- 2022: Margot Friedländer (Germany)
- 2024: Kaja Kallas (Estonia)
- 2025: Bill Gates (United States)
- 2026: Alexander Stubb (Finland)

== History and structure ==
The Walther Rathenau Institut was founded in Berlin at the beginning of 2008 by and on initiative of the publicist and entrepreneur Michael Gotthelf and Hartmuth A. Jung.

Board

- Hartmuth A. Jung (chairman)
- Bijan Djir-Sarai, MP
- Florian Rentsch

Advisory board

- Michael A. Gotthelf (founder and chairman of the advisory board)
- Renata Alt, MP
- Klaus Heiermann
- Andreas Reichel
- Karl von Rohr

Management

- Mikolaj Ciechanowicz

== See also ==
- Walther Rathenau
- Rathenau Institute
