= Dan Diner =

Israeli-German historian (born 1946)

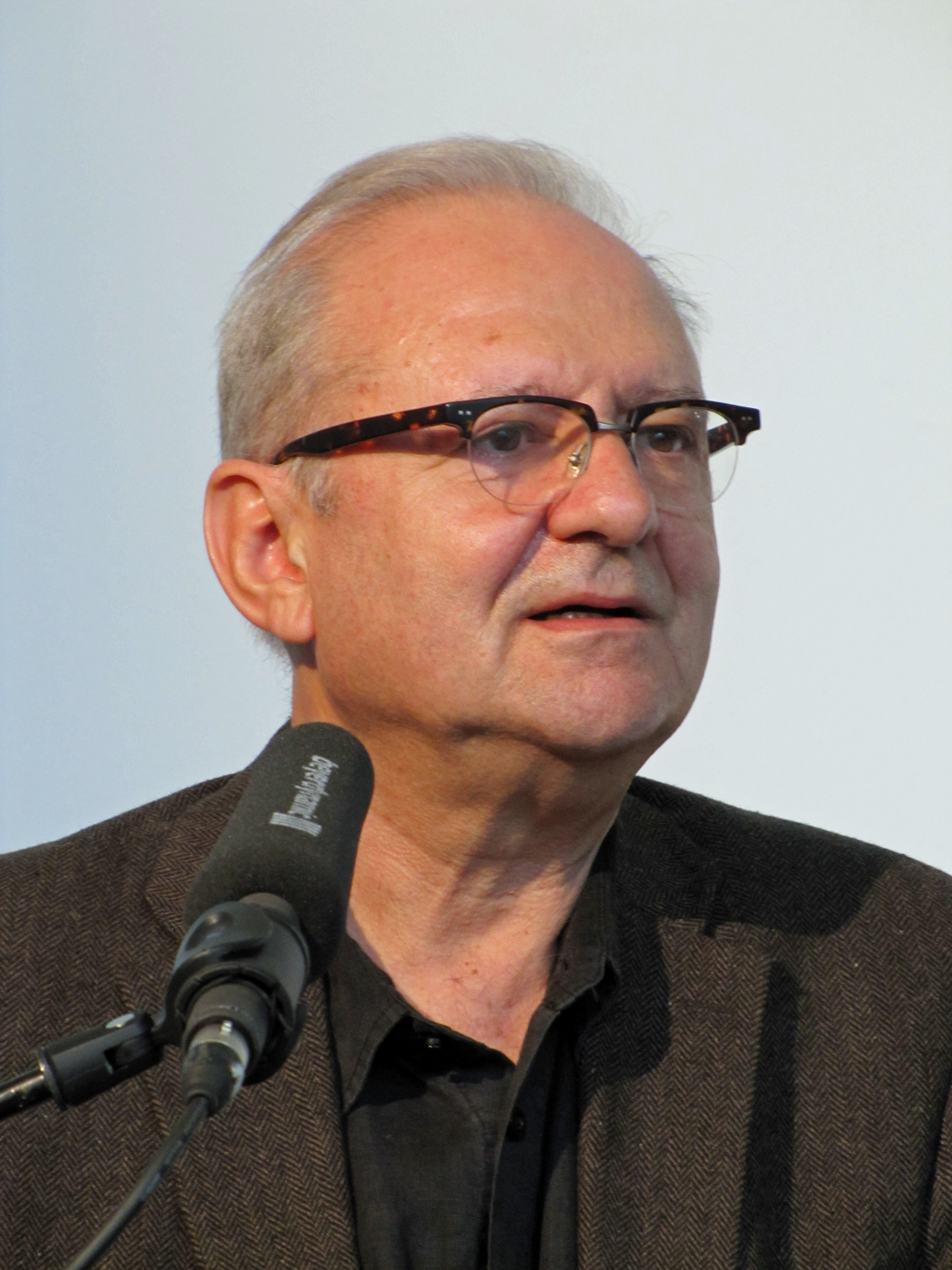
Diner in 2013

Dan Diner (Hebrew: דן דינר; born 20 May 1946) is an Israeli-German historian and political writer. Born in Munich, he is emeritus professor of modern history at the Hebrew University of Jerusalem. Diner is Chair of the Alfred Landecker Foundation and its Governing Council. Formerly he served as Director of the Simon Dubnow Institute for Jewish history and Jewish culture, and professor at the historical seminary of the University of Leipzig. He is also a full member of the philological-historical class of the Saxon Academy of Sciences.

Diner's research focuses on two main topics: the conceptualization of modern Jewish history and an interpretation of WWII observed from the periphery. He has published widely on 20th-century history, modern Jewish history, Middle Eastern history, and German history, particularly in the period of National Socialism and the Holocaust. He has twice held fellowships (in 2014–15 and the Fall of 2015) at the Swedish Collegium for Advanced Study in Uppsala, Sweden. In 2025, Diner was awarded the Ludwig Börne Prize, suggested by the sole judge Daniel Cohn-Bendit, and the Sigmund Freud Prize.
