= Dominican Monastery (Frankfurt) =

Former Christian monastery in Frankfurt

Coordinates: 50°6′42″N 8°41′16″E

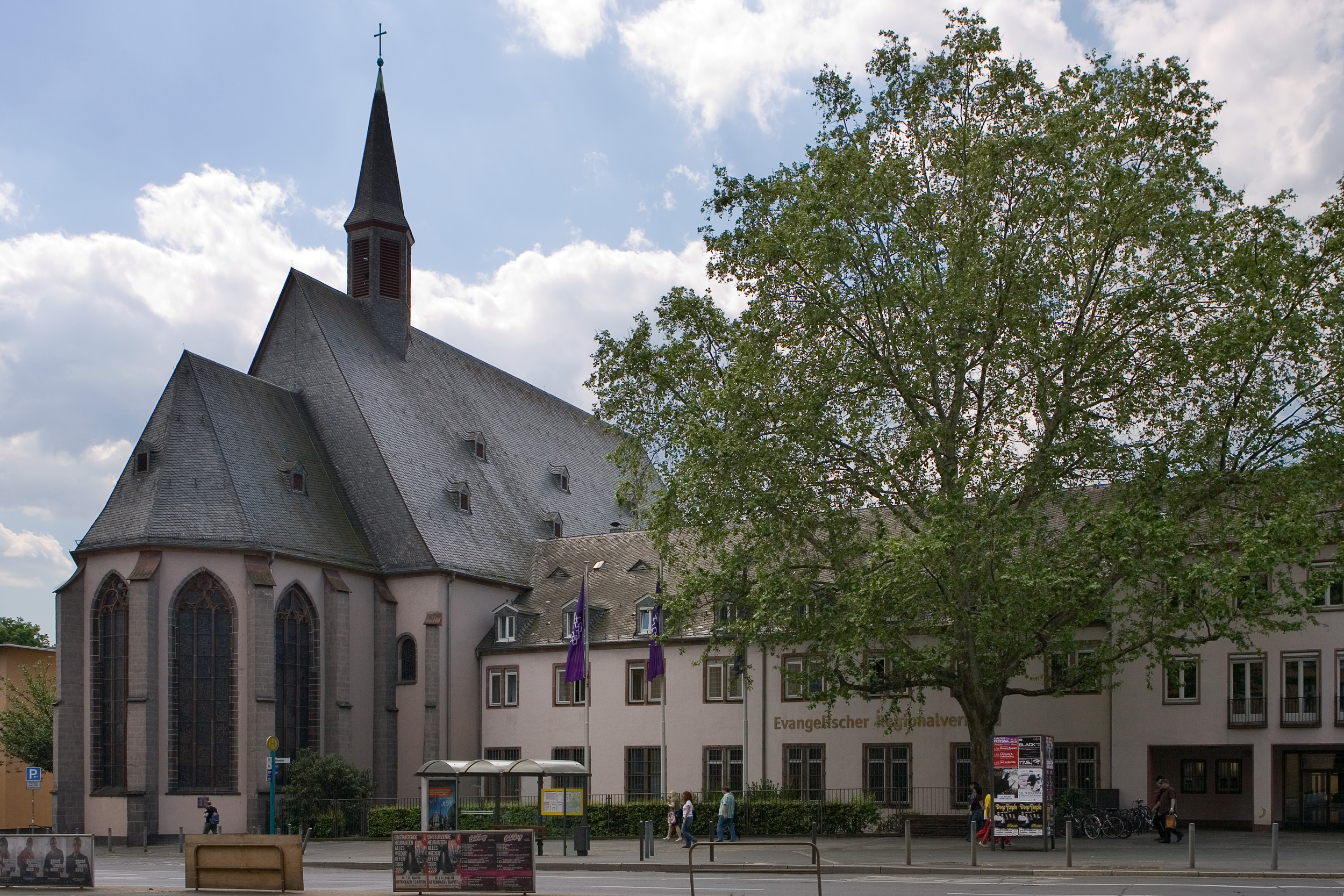
The modern Church of the Holy Spirit and Dominican Monastery

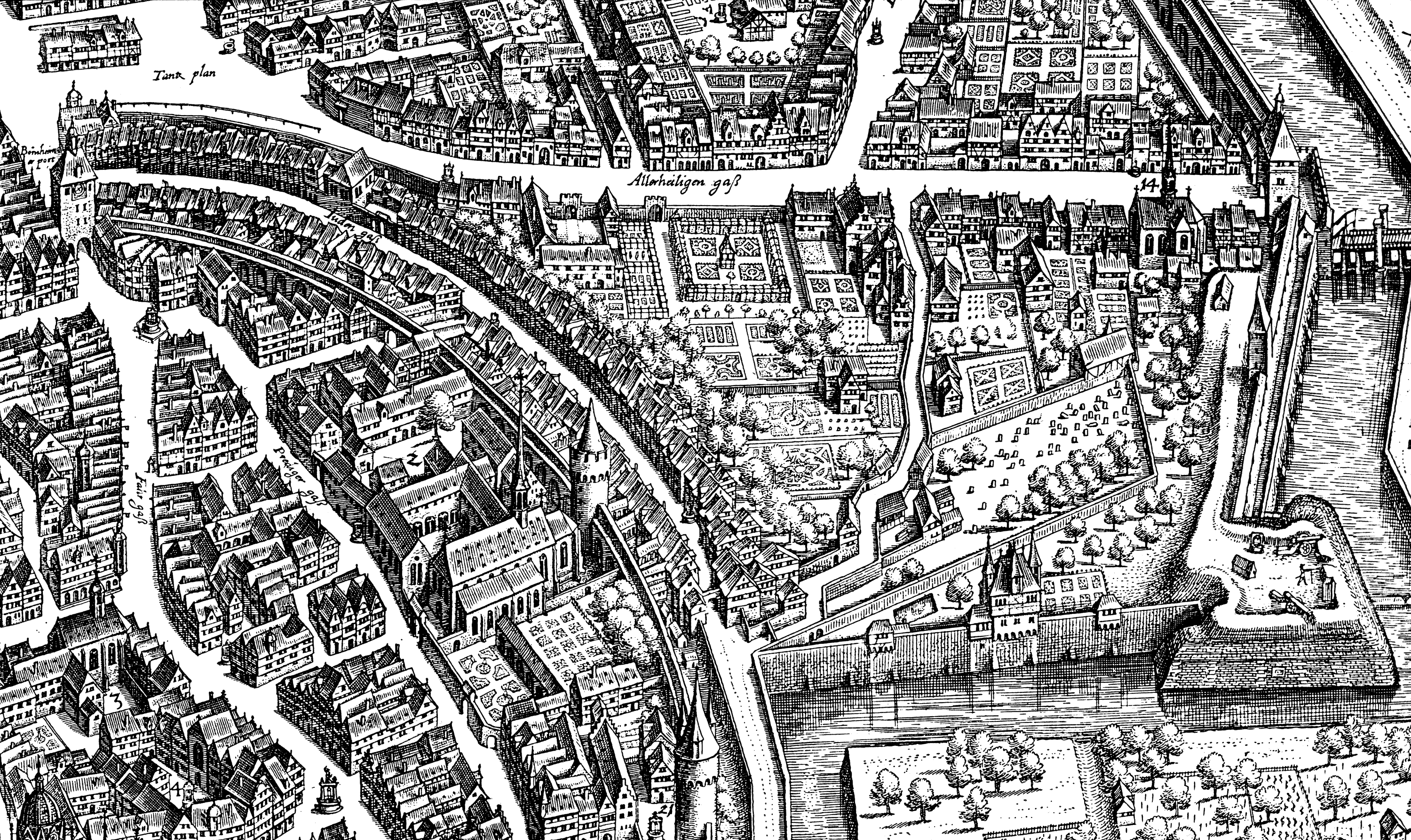
Map of Frankfurt in 1628, showing the monastery (lower left) and the Frankfurt Jewish ghetto

The Dominican Monastery (German: Dominikanerkloster) is a former Christian monastery in Frankfurt, Germany. It is the seat of Protestant Regional Association, a group of Protestant congregations and deaneries in the city, and serves as the convention site for the Synod of the Protestant Church in Hesse and Nassau, held usually twice a year. The former monastery compound includes a Lutheran church building, called the Church of the Holy Spirit (German: Heiliggeistkirche).

Founded in 1233, the monastery came under the possession of the city in 1803. Completely destroyed during World War II, it was rebuilt in 1955–1957 by the architect Gustav Scheinpflug based on the old floor plan and layout, but in the architectural style of the post-war period. Of the original Gothic structure, only the late Gothic style choir of the church remains.

== History ==
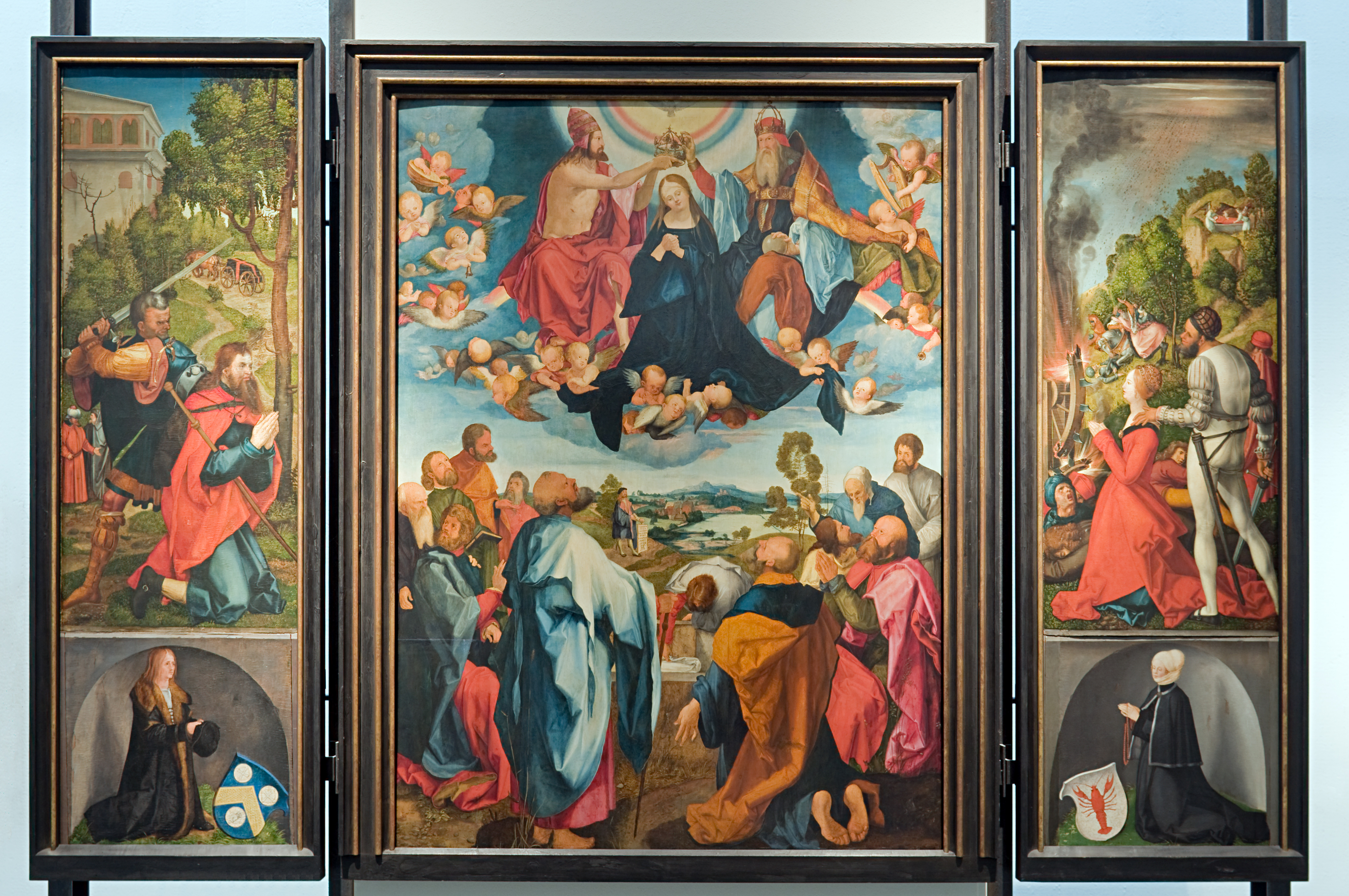
The Heller Altar, which stood in the church from 1509 to 1615

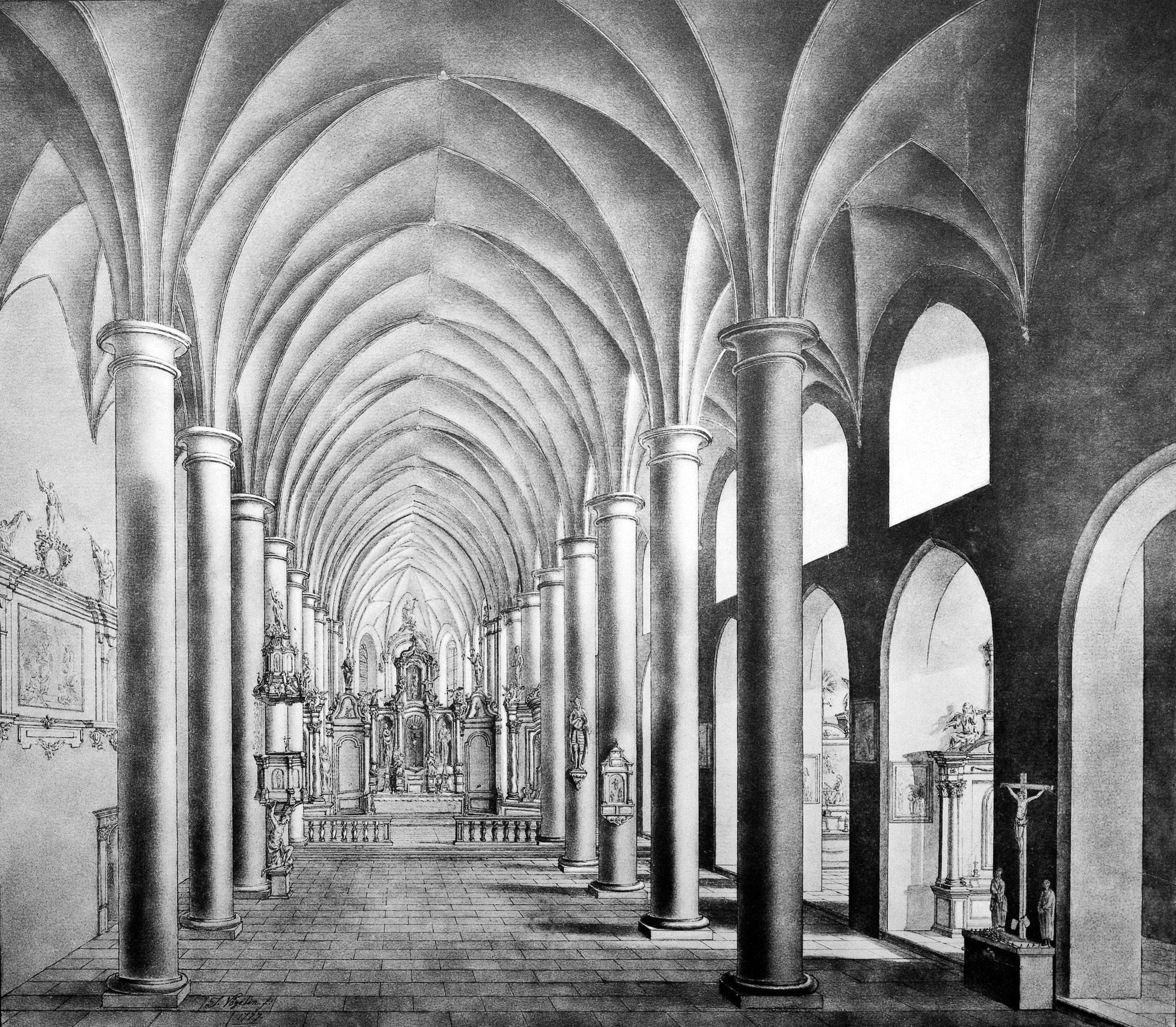
The church interior in 1777

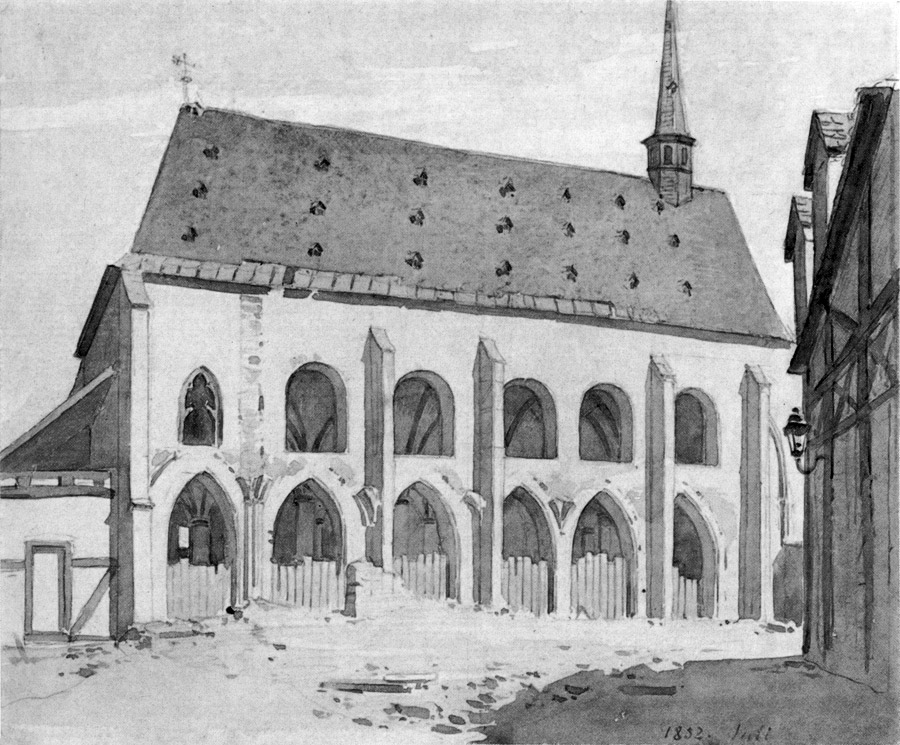
The monastery as depicted in a drawing by Carl Theodor Reiffenstein, 1852

=== Founding ===
The Dominican Order initially established itself in Frankfurt in 1233. The city assigned its members a plot of land near the medieval city wall (Staufenmauer), where they built a small house which would later serve as the monastery entrance. Construction of the actual monastery began in 1238, but the pace of building was slow due to the Order's reliance on alms from abroad. In 1245 the monastery buildings were completed, but the construction of the church on the southern part of the complex lasted a few more years. From a papal bull issued on 30 May 1259, the church appears to have already been consecrated at that time.

=== 14th century ===
The monastery church was, after the imperial Collegiate Church of Saint Bartholomew the largest church in the city. It attracted several prominent scholars and preachers and received numerous donations from the local citizenry. The elections of the German kings Adolf of Nassau (1292), Henry VII (1308) and Günther von Schwarzburg (1349) took place at the monastery.

The monastery was also involved in the conflict between Emperor Louis IV and Pope John XXII. After the Dominicans sided with the papacy, they were expelled from Frankfurt and other cities in 1330. They were allowed to return to Frankfurt after the city council and the citizenry appealed to the Emperor, but were obliged to not oppose the Emperor and clergymen loyal to him with either "words or works."

In 1359 the Emperor Charles IV placed the Dominicans under his protection, a privilege that was regularly confirmed by his successors.

=== Late Middle Ages ===
In the 15th century the monastery was significantly expanded. A cloister was built in 1449 and further extended in 1499 so that it was fully enclosed in all four directions. In 1470–1472 the choir of the church was rebuilt in the late Gothic style. The monastery library became the largest in Frankfurt, although its collections were later transferred to the city library.

In 1462 the Jewish residents of Frankfurt were forced to relocated to the Frankfurter Judengasse to the east of the monastery, on the opposite side of the Staufenmauer. The close proximity between the Dominicans and Jews became a source of tension, and conflicts between the two groups frequently arose.

=== Decline ===
The heyday of the monastery ended with the introduction of the Protestant Reformation in Frankfurt in 1533. The city council initially forbade the Dominicans from public preaching; it also planned to subject the property of the church to public use, and to inventory and regulate its donations. In response, the provincial chapter of the Order brought a lawsuit against the city before the Imperial Chamber Court, and the council eventually put its plans aside so as to not come into open conflict with the Emperor.

The monastery remained a Catholic enclave in the Lutheran-dominated city until its secularization in 1803. The buildings were then acquired by the city of Frankfurt. During this time, the church underwent only minor changes, the most notable being the building of a Baroque extension on the western facade in circa 1680.

In the 18th century the monastery served as the venue for most of the assemblies of both the Electoral Rhenish and the Upper Rhenish Circles of the Holy Roman Empire. In 1790 the archbishop of Mainz dissolved the Dominican monastery and converted it into a new association, the Congregatio ad Sanctum Fridericum.

=== Secularization ===
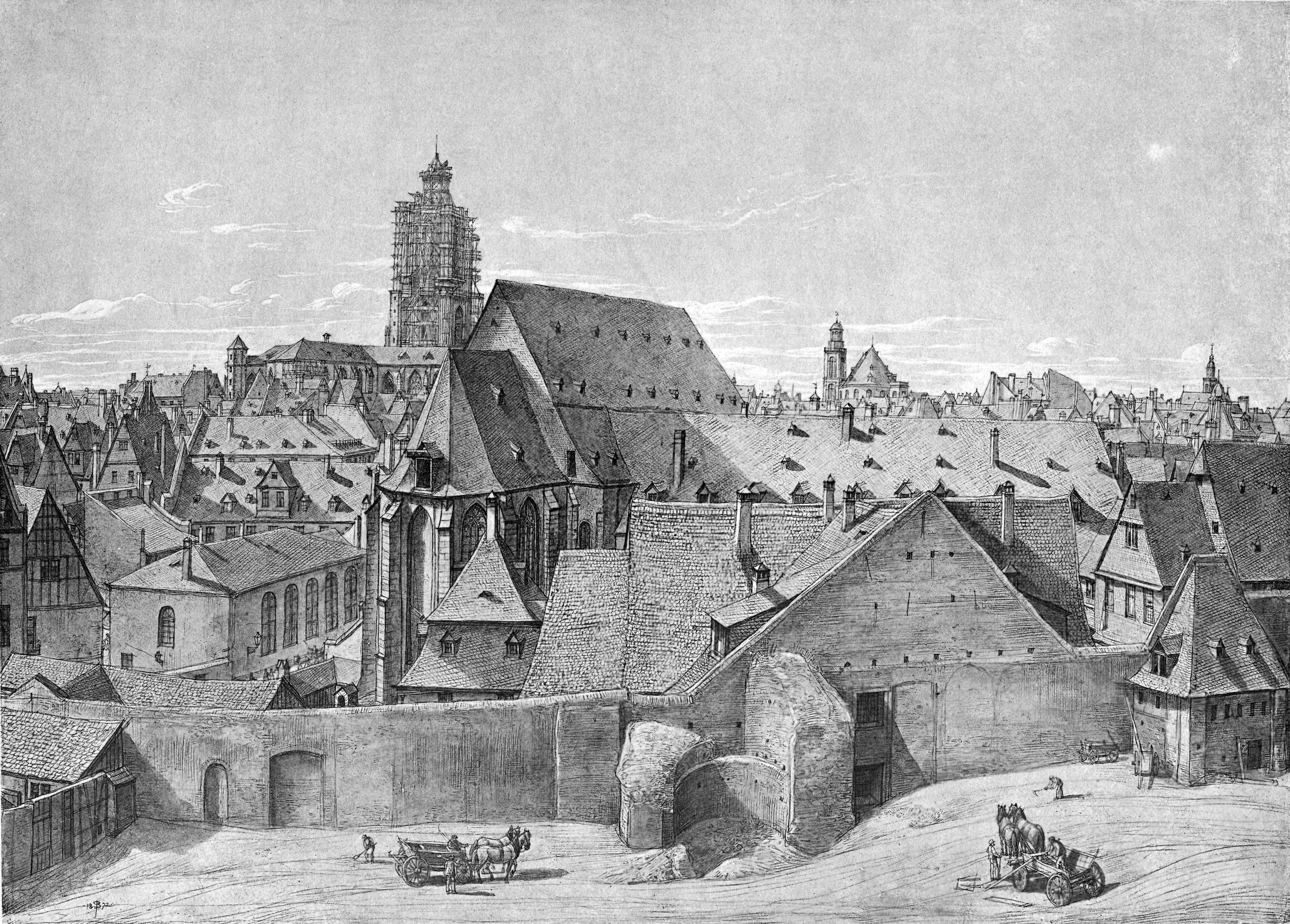
The monastery in 1872

With the Reichsdeputationshauptschluss of 1803 the monastery fell to the Free Imperial City of Frankfurt. During the 19th century the monastery was used for several purposes, such as a storehouse for property taken by the city during secularization, a goods store and, after 1815, a barracks for the Linienbataillons, the military of the Free City. In 1809 eighty-two of the monastery's paintings, including works by Hans von Aachen and Philipp Uffenbach, were purchased and donated to the Frankfurt Museum; most of these pieces are now at the Historical Museum or on permanent loan at the Städel.

Plans to demolish the church were drafted in 1875, but were stopped due to the intervention of the Prussian Generalkonservator Ferdinand von Quast. Another demolition attempt in 1884 was also prevented, but renovation work was undertaken in 1885–1889 and a wall dividing the nave of the church was built. The eastern half, together with the choir, was used as a gymnasium for the Arnsburger School, which was itself housed in the monastic buildings, while the western side received the addition of an organ matroneum and several side rooms and was used as a public hall. In the 1920s these additions were removed as part of a restoration of the church.

=== National Socialists, destruction and rebuilding ===
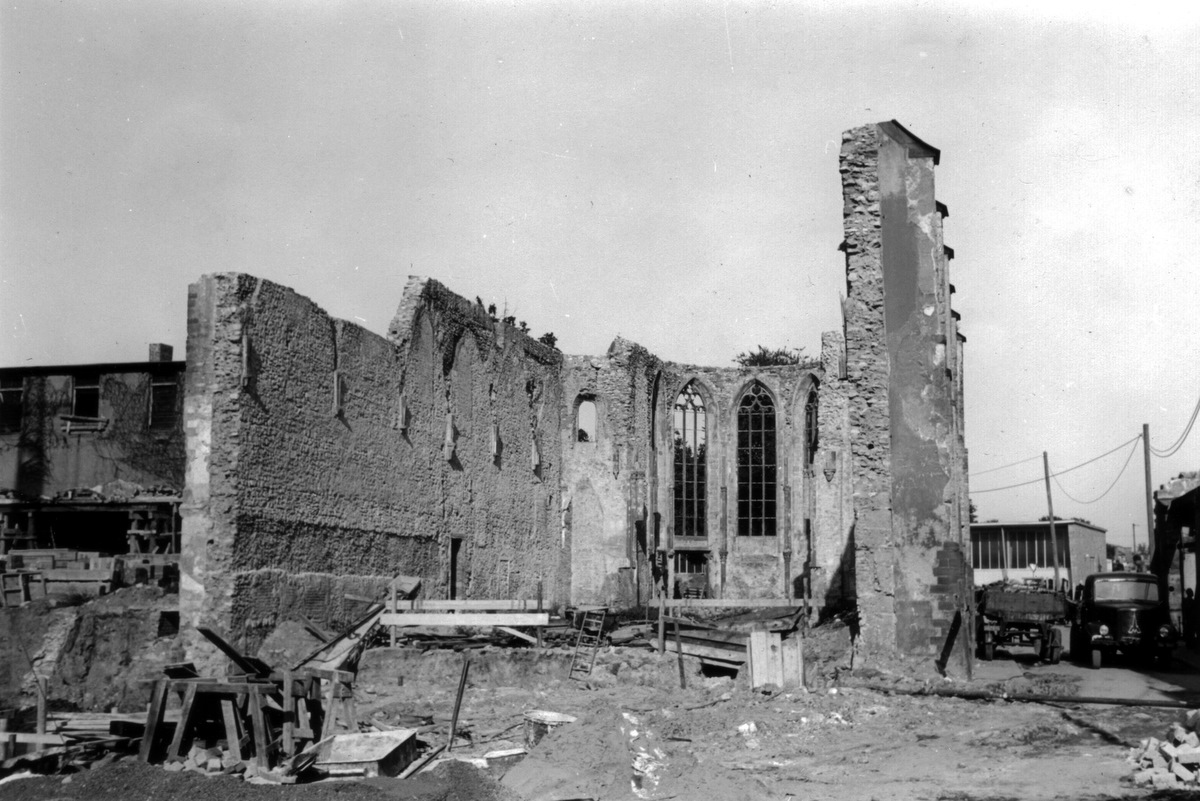
The ruined church in the 1950s

Prior to the Second World War, the monastery was home to the Museum of Prehistory and Early History (now the Archaeological Museum). According to some sources, the church also served as a storage facility for works of art confiscated from deported Jews.

On 18 March 1944 the then secularised church was destroyed during the Allied bombing of Frankfurt. Its ruins were removed in the postwar period, except for the remnants of the choir and north wall.

With the adoption of the Lutheran Reformation by the Free Imperial City of Frankfurt in 1533 the city had unilaterally appropriated all religious buildings within its jurisdiction, later added those which fell under its jurisdiction in 1803, such as the Dominican Convent. The status of the churches being city property but used by Lutherans (or Catholics) was statutorily fixed in 1830 by the deeds of dotation.

One of the Lutheran congregation held usufruct of the Weißfrauenkirche, likewise destroyed in 1944. After the city had decided not to reconstruct that church, in 1953 the Lutheran congregation and the city concluded to exchange the congregation's usufruct to the destroyed Weißfrauenkirche for that of the to-be-rebuilt former convent with its former abbey.

The city commissioned the architect Gustav Scheinpflug for the project. The former Dominican abbey was rebuilt and on the second Sunday of Advent, 1961, the completed building was inaugurated as the new Lutheran Holy Spirit Church. It is now one of the city's dotation churches left for eternal usage by a Lutheran congregation. The Lutheran congregation enjoying usufruct of the Holy Spirit Church building is a member of the Protestant Church in Hesse and Nassau, comprising Lutheran, Reformed and United Protestant congregations.

=== The monastery today ===
The monastery is now the seat of the Protestant Regional Association of Frankfurt, which provides administrative and other support to the congregations and deaneries of the city. The Synod of the Protestant Church in Hesse and Nassau, usually held biannually, also takes place at the monastery.

== Architecture ==
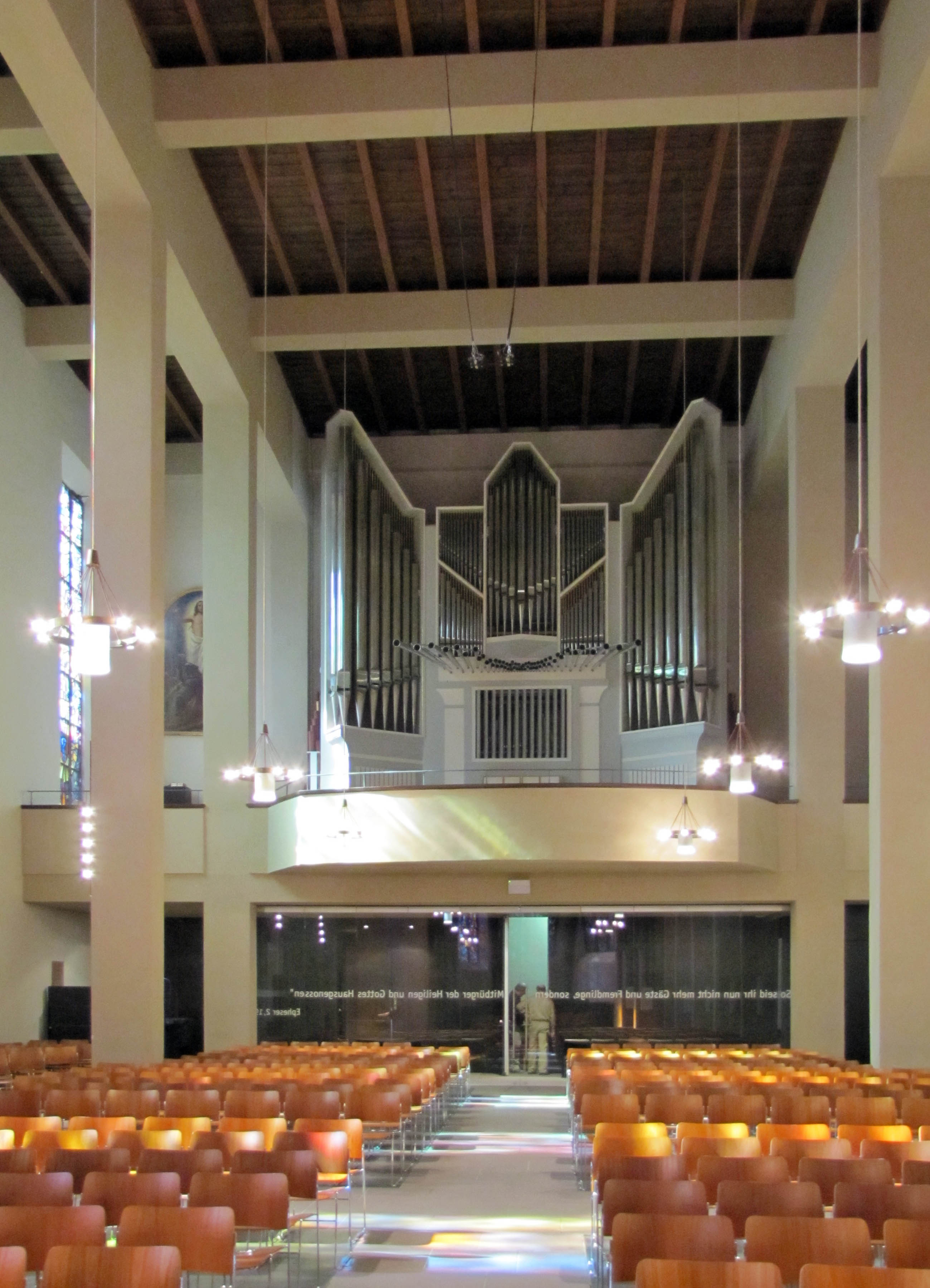
The modern interior of the church

The old church was a three-aisled early Gothic hall without a transept, measuring 53.60 meters long and 15.60 meters wide. It was built mainly from rubble stone, with parts of ashlar also present. The nave was eight bays long; the westernmost bay featured an ornate stellar vault, while the remaining bays had simple rib vaults. The vaults of the southern and slightly narrower north aisles of the nave were about one to two meters lower than the 11.60 meter central aisle. The vaults were supported by seven pairs of simple circular pillars featuring base plates and unadorned, cup-shaped capitals. Above the eastern pair of pillars of the nave was an octagonal Gothic flèche.

During the bombing of 18 March 1944, the nave and several of the side aisle bays were destroyed and the inside of the church was burned. The chancel arch, a large portion of the pillars and several vaults of the nave initially survived, but these collapsed in 1954 before the start of rebuilding. Of the original church today only the outer walls of the nave choir, consisting of a bay with ribbed vaults, a five-eighths polygonal apse and the tracery of three of the five stained glass windows have been preserved. Of the monastery, the former sacristy (which now serves as a refectory) and the chapter house were preserved to an extent that their remains could be integrated into the new structure.

The new building of the Church of the Holy Spirit was based on the austere aesthetics of the reconstruction period. Only the choir was restored to its old model. The new nave was again divided into three aisles by two rows of pillars. The existing foundations were retained, but the load distribution has been changed so that the supporting pillars accommodate a higher load than the previous building, while the exterior walls were relieved. The new building is also more than 10 meters shorter than the old monastery church. The church today can accommodate around 700 visitors.
