= Jürgen Kaube =

German journalist and author (born 1962)

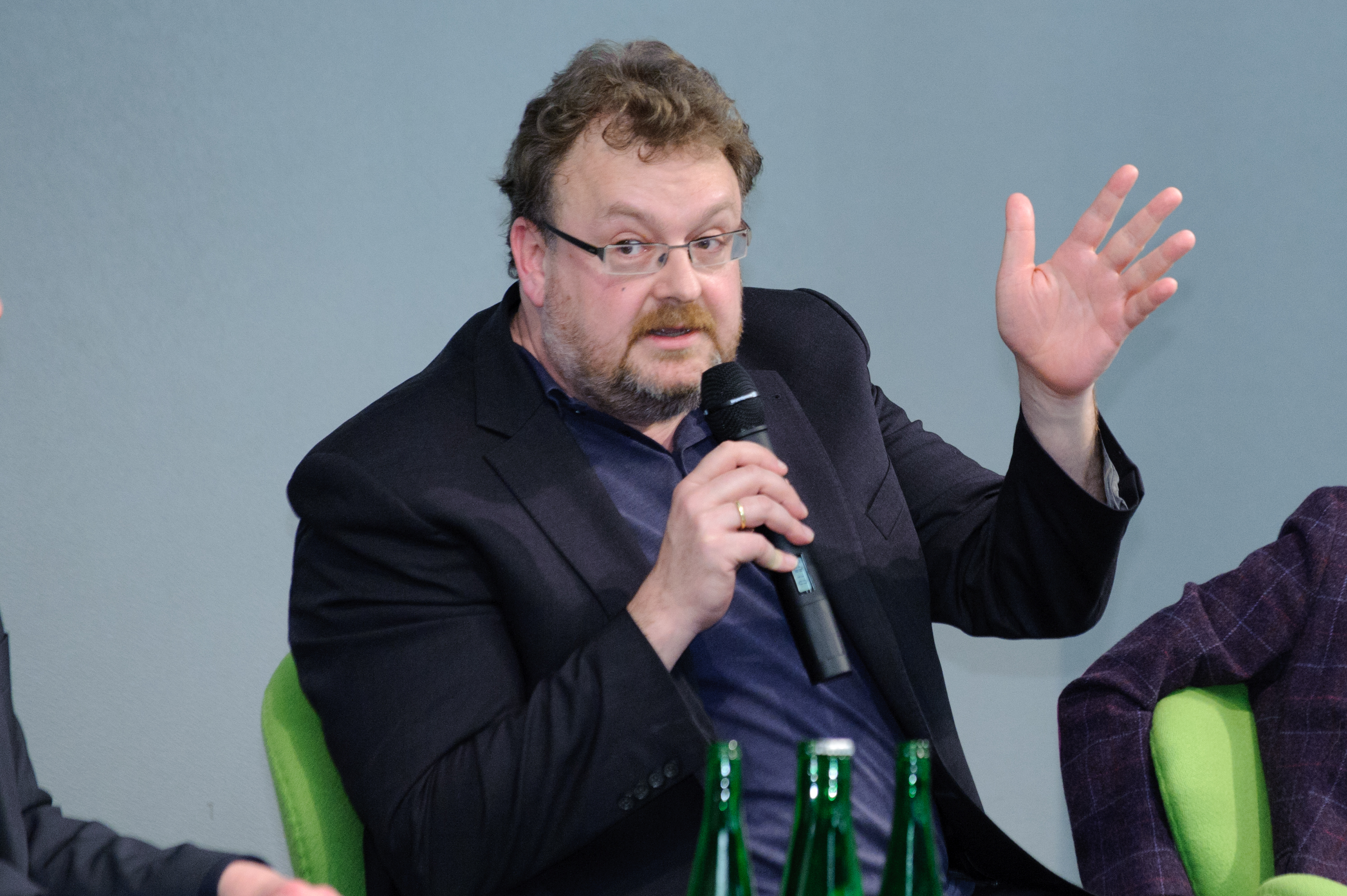
- Kaube in 2011

Jürgen Kaube (born 19 June 1962) is a German journalist. He is one of four editors-at large of the leading German conservative newspaper Frankfurter Allgemeine Zeitung (FAZ).

== Biography ==
Jürgen Kaube was born on 19 June 1962 in Worms. Kaube studied philosophy at the Free University Berlin and was an assistant to Niklas Luhmann. He has been working as a journalist since 1992 and became a FAZ editor-at-large for culture in 2015. The year before, Rowohlt Verlag had published his biography of Max Weber, Max Weber. Ein Leben zwischen den Epochen, which focuses on Weber's interactions with the cultural environment Weber was living in. A collection of Kaube's essays entitled Otto Normalabweicher. Der Aufstieg der Minderheiten was published in 2007.
