= Fortifications of Frankfurt =

System of military defences of Frankfurt am Main

- Frankfurt am Main in Germany
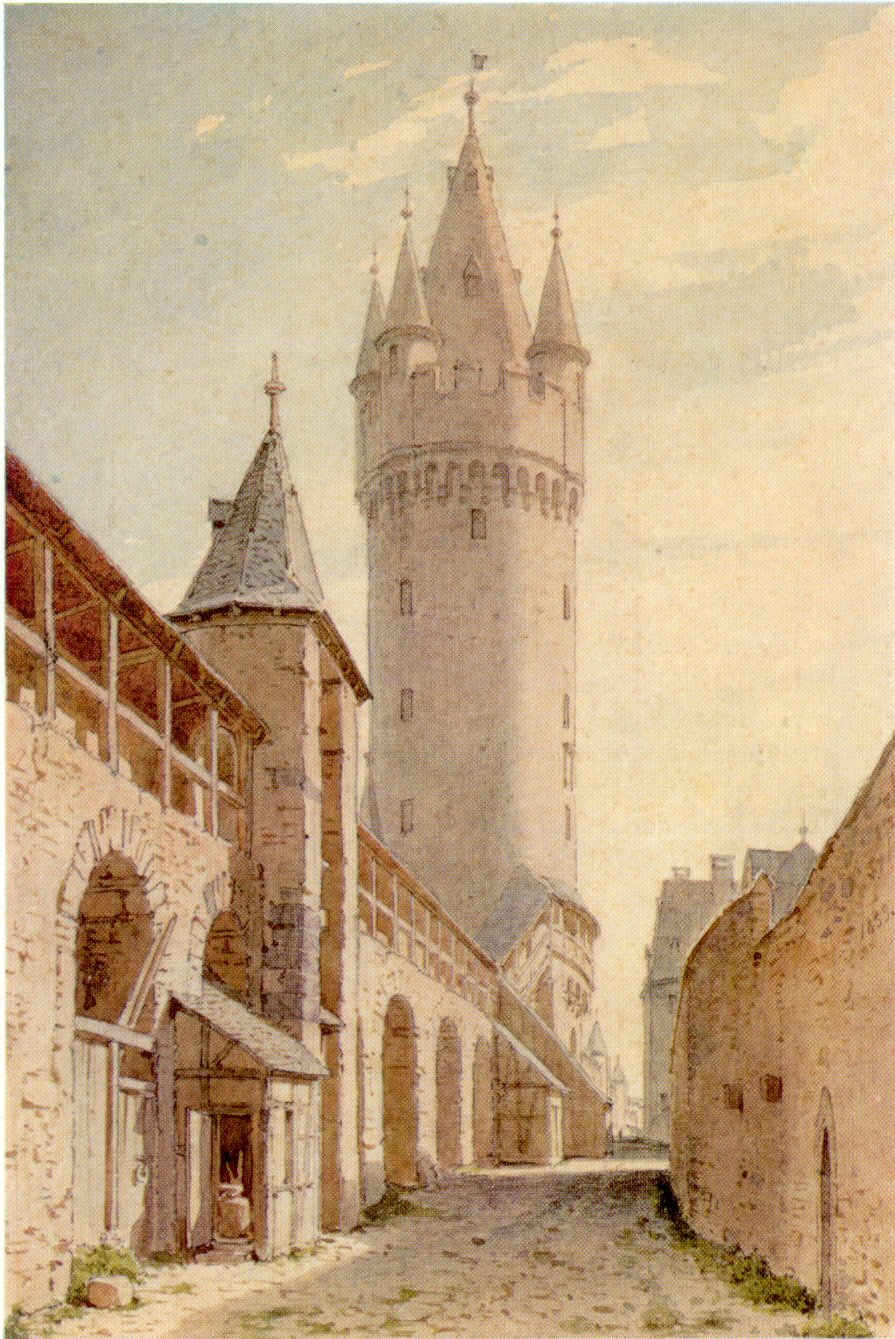
- Outer ward (Zwinger) between the walls of the fortification

Site information
- Type: Medieval fortification (c.1000–1630s); Bastion fort (after 1630s)

Location
- Location within Germany
- Coordinates: 50.12°N 8.66°E

Site history
- Built: c. 1000
- In use: 1000 to 1806–1816
- Battles/wars: Second Schmalkaldic War

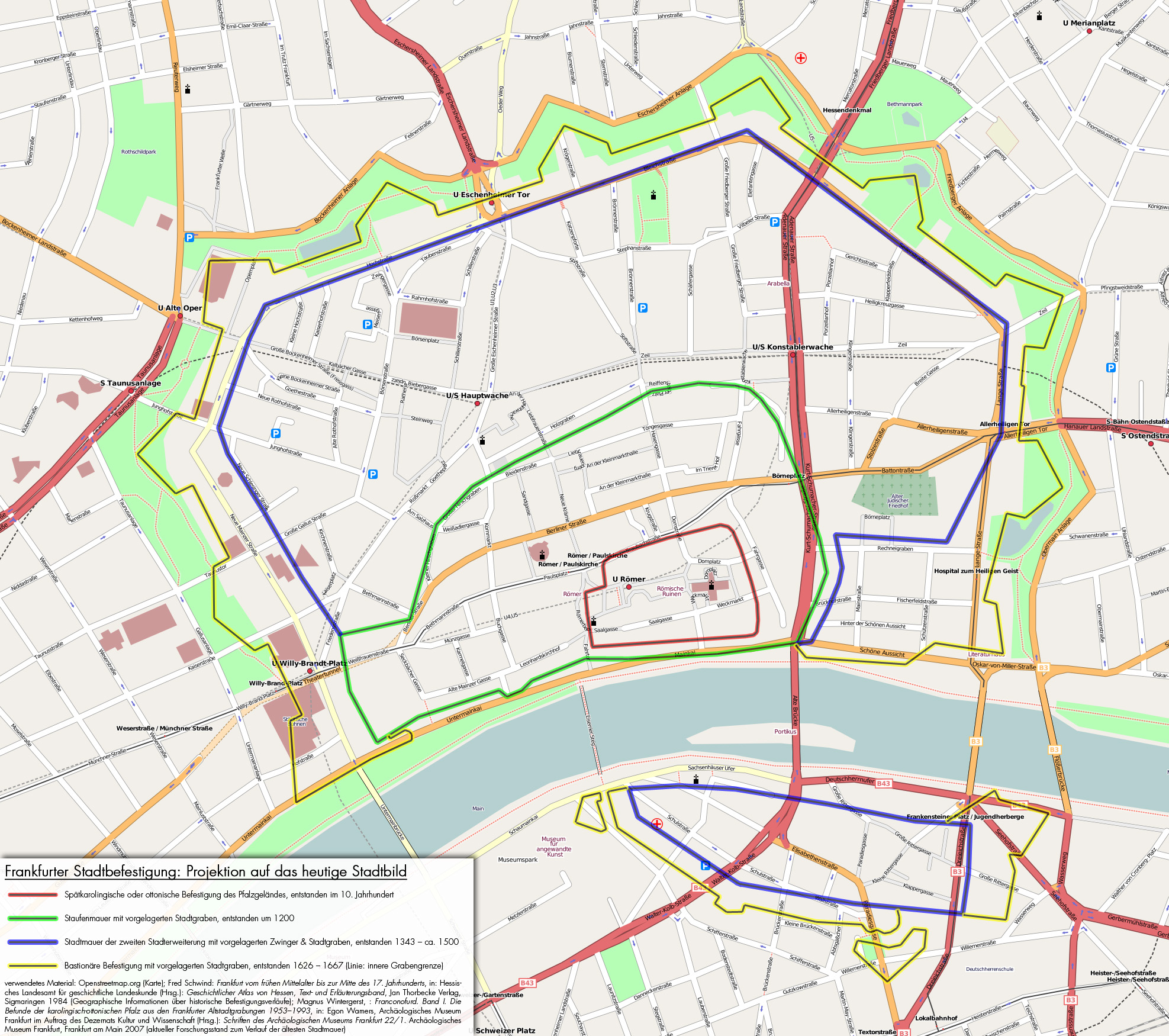
Position of the historic fortification shown on a current city map

The fortifications of Frankfurt were a system of military defences of the German city of Frankfurt am Main which existed from the Middle Ages into the 19th century. Around 1000 the first city wall was built. It enclosed the area of what is now the Königspfalz in modern Frankfurt. In the twelfth century the settlement expanded into what is now Altstadt. For its protection an additional wall, the Staufenmauer, was erected. Starting in 1333, the Neustadt suburb developed north of the Altstadt and was encompassed by an additional wall with five gates. In the fifteenth century, a "landwehr border" was created around the entire territory of the Free City of Frankfurt. Beginning in 1628, the medieval city wall was developed to form a bastion fortress under the municipal architect Johann Dilich.

After its defeat in the Kronberg Feud in 1389, Frankfurt consistently avoided military conflicts and relied on its diplomatic relationships throughout the Holy Roman Empire and beyond. For this reason, the city's fortifications, during the nearly eight centuries of their existence, have only had to stand a siege once – during the Second Schmalkaldic War, in July 1552. During the eighteenth century the fortifications lost their military significance and hindered further expansion of the city: the walls were torn down between 1806 and 1818. Their former position now forms a green belt around the inner city. Various components of the fortifications are preserved, including: seven towers, among them the Eschenheimer Turm; a 200-metre stretch of the Staufenmauer; remnants of the landwehr border; and a 90-metre section of a casemate, discovered in 2009, which once formed part of the baroque bastion fortress.

== First city wall ==
=== Königspfalz Frankfurt ===
Frankfurt's oldest fortifications were created to protect the Carolingian palace (German: Karolingische Pfalz) which was first recorded in 822. Until the 1930s it was thought to have been a predecessor of today's Saalhof. In 1936, Heinrich Bingemer proved by excavations that this originated in the Hohenstaufen era, and concluded that the site of the Carolingian palace may have been located further to the east. In 1953 archaeological excavations in the core of the historic town, made possible by the bombing and destruction of Frankfurt in World War II, revealed remnants of the historic palace, west of Frankfurt Cathedral, in the basement of the Haus zur Goldenen Waage.

The palace was situated on a flood-safe elevation in the east of the Altstadt. It was originally an island between the southern Main and the northern Braubach, a river which silted up in the first Christian millennium and was canalised during the Medieval period. South of the palace was the ford (German: "Furt"), which gave Frankfurt not only its name but also its reason for existence. West of the palace, a swampy lowland ran across today's Römerberg to the Main.

=== Archaeological findings ===
==== Excavations ====
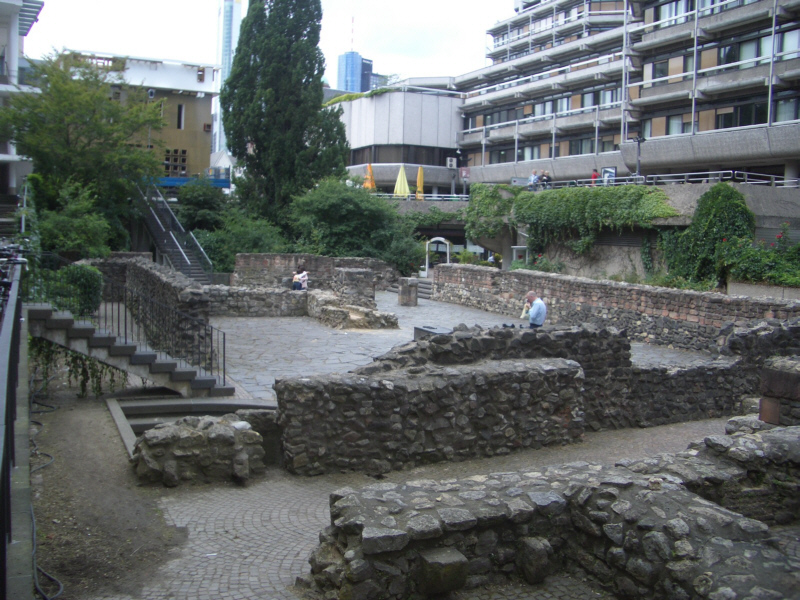
Remains of the Carolingian palace

When parts of the wall were brought to light during the construction of the Dompfarrhaus on the northern Domplatz in 1827, and later in the cellars of houses in the western Altstadt area, Ulrich's description of the early medieval fortification was considered to be confirmed. During the construction of the Braubachstrasse through the Altstadt from 1904 to 1906 Christian Ludwig Thomas, an architect commissioned by the Historical Museum of Frankfurt, was able to confirm the northern and north-western position of the wall by sinking over 50 excavation shafts.

From 1953 to 1955, archaeologists continued the research and inspected the city wall in the area of the Hauptzollamt (today's Haus am Dom). Archaeological studies of the area of the Saalhof from 1958 to 1961 by Otto Stamm proved the position of southern wall section along the Main and a short western part of the wall below the Saalgasse. The last excavations directly connected with the historic wall were made in 1976, again on the premises of the Dompfarrhaus. Archaeological research to establish the south-eastern and eastern location of the wall has not yet taken place. The stratigraphy in the area of the Römerberg was presumably significantly damaged by construction works in the Medieval period and destroyed by the construction of an underground car park in the 1970s, reducing the amount of information obtainable in this area.

==== Archaeological record ====
The appearance and the composition of the wall are reliably known. On average it had a thickness and height of 2 metres (7 ft). For what are assumed to be psychological reasons, it was 3 metres (10 ft) thick on the Main side to the south. The fortification was made up of coarse gravel and rough-hewn quarried stone, but also contained higher-quality pieces of sandstone from Vilbel and basalt, possibly taken from demolished Roman structures. The material was relatively crude, and only on the outside does it have an orderly opus spicatum structure. The mortar was poor quality, consisting of loam mixed with plant fibres and animal hair. According to Thomas, the foundation was so deficient that the wall tilted 30 centimetres (12 in) away from the vertical. Thomas also uncovered sections of wall that had apparently been repaired using higher quality mortar, demonstrating the importance of the wall: Despite its significant flaws, it was apparently considered to be important enough for restoration.

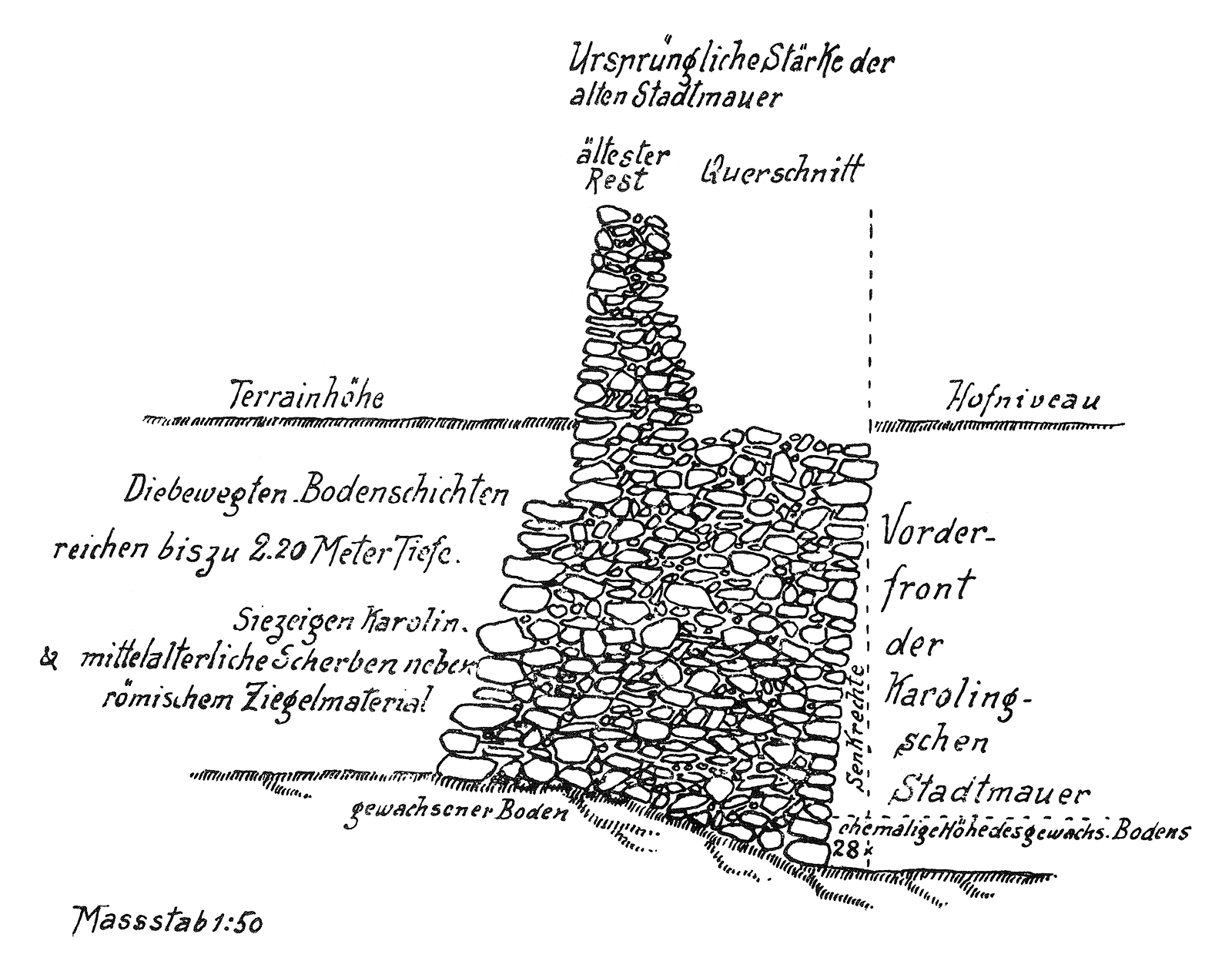
Cross section of the wall. Thomas, 1904

Thomas attributed the initial creation of the wall to the 9th century and considered Louis the German to have given the orders for its construction. He based this on Pingsdorf ware found close to the wall, and because Pingsdorf ware was thought to have been Carolingian. During the excavations in 1976, a becherkachel made of coarse mica was recovered. This type of pottery came into use at the end of the 10th century, and Pingsdorf ware is currently considered to be a post-900 development, leading to the conclusion that the wall may not have been a Carolingian construction, but an Ottonian one. Additionally, an official document from 994 describes the city as "castello" (a fortress), making it reasonable to assume that the wall existed in 994, matching the archaeological findings.

The position of the historic wall is best documented in the north-west, due to numerous excavations the archaeological advantage of being able to dig in undisturbed layers. The fortification ran between the Hainer Hof north of the Kannengiessergasse and a 1.1 metres (3 ft 7 in) wide gate discovered by Thomas in the area of the Borngasse. From there, it continued to the Steinernes Haus and – contrary to expectations – made a sharp turn towards the Römerberg.

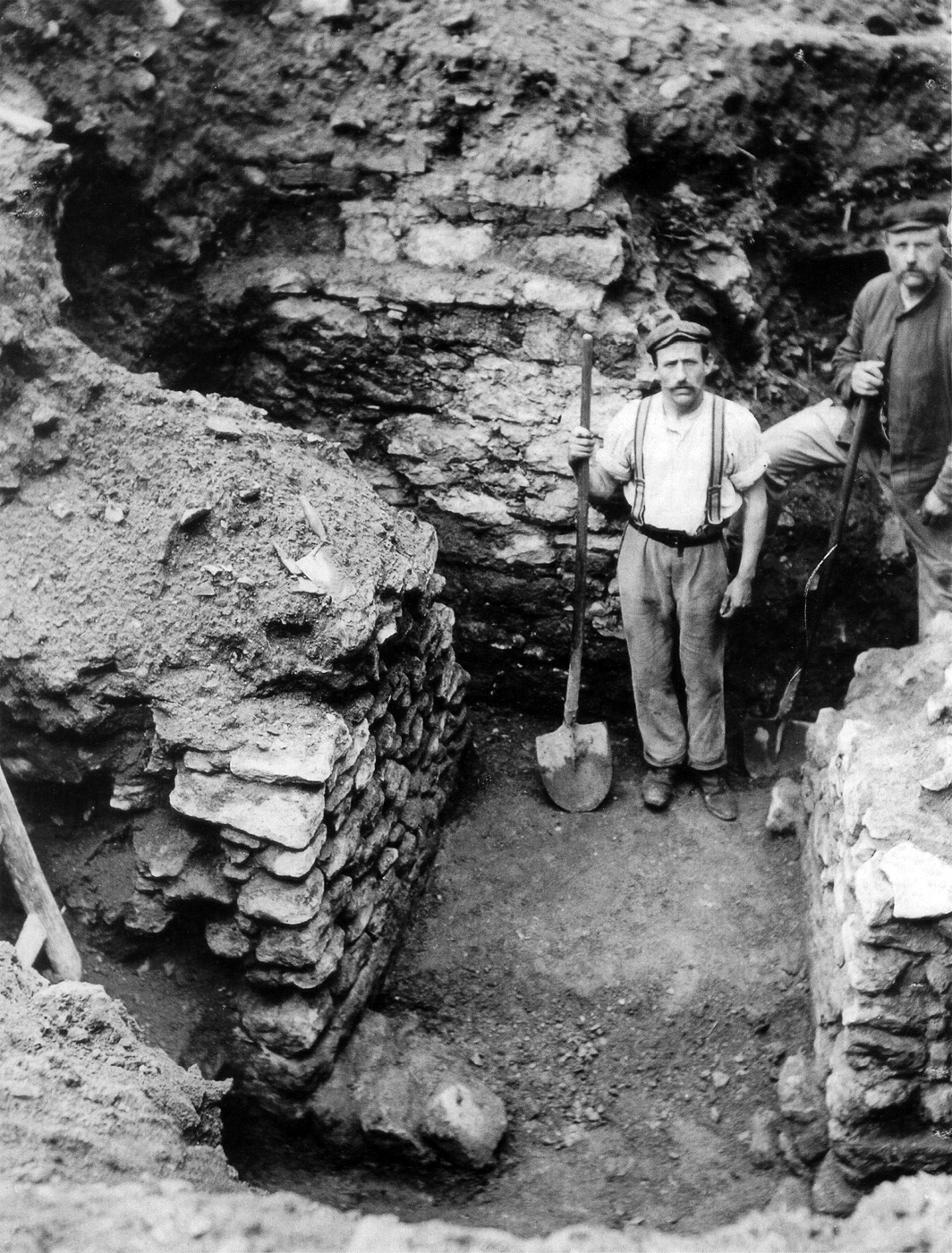
Gate at the Borngasse, 1906

The discovery of an east–west wall at the northern Samstagsberg presupposes the existence of another gate at the position where one leaves the Römerberg today, entering the Alter Markt in the direction of the cathedral. If a line were drawn from there to the findings in the area of the Saalhof, it leads to the conclusion that the east-west wall must have made a near 90° turn at this point, directly connecting to the stronger wall on the bank of the Main. However, the significant disruption of the soil below the Römerberg, which was noticed by Thomas, makes it equally possible that the previously mentioned east–west wall section was constructed later, and was a direct connection between the north-west wall and the southern part of the wall. Archaeologically, the southern part of the wall has only been confirmed to have existed as far as the Geistpförtchen. Furthermore, the simultaneous existence of the southern wall and the Ottonian wall is disputed.

Presumedly, the Dreimetermauer ("three-metre wall", referring to the thickness of the wall at the Main) followed the natural course of the river east of the Geistpförtchen as well. The riverside at the time was at the same height as the southern Saalgasse. The wall is assumed to have then run east of the cathedral, about in the middle of the Kannengießergasse, from north to south, connecting back to the proven position of the wall along today's Braubachstraße. (Note: This was a nightmare to translate and may contain errors)

The surprising archaeological findings of the early twentieth century have been explained by post-war excavations. Exactly in the middle of the wall-enclosed area, the Carolingan palace was located together with its associated farm buildings and the predecessor of the cathedral, the Salvatorkirche, consecrated in 852. Carolingian Frankfurt was thus much smaller than historically expected, and its fortification, according to present knowledge, has been built by the subsequent Ottonian dynasty around 1000.

== Staufenmauer wall ==
Between 1018 and 1045 the Carolingian royal palace was destroyed by a fire and built over. Conrad III of Germany, elected king in 1138, ordered the construction of a new imperial castle, the Saalhof. The settlement around this castle expanded beyond the silted-up northern Main river branch. By the end of the twelfth or the beginning of the thirteenth century, the enlarged settlement was surrounded by a new wall, the Staufenmauer, enclosing the area of about 0.5 square kilometres, known as the Frankfurter Altstadt. The new wall was located on the bank of the Main river, a little above the bridge, (Note: Likely Alte Brücke) running to the north along the Wollgraben up to the later Dominikanerkloster, and from there in a large arc north-west towards the Bornheimer Pforte at the Fahrgasse. From there, it ran in a westerly direction along the Holzgraben towards the Katharinenpforte, then in an arc along the Kleiner and Grosser Hirschgraben towards the south-west, and made a sharp turn just before the western end of the Weissfrauenstrasse, towards the Main in the south. Along the Main, there was the river wall.

Due to the crossbow coming into widespread use in western Europe, a major feature of the expansion involved increasing the height of the walls to approximately 7 metres (20 ft) and up to 3-metre-thick (10 ft). They had a chemin de ronde (wall-walk) and were protected by a dry moat. There were three main gates: the Guldenpforte at the western end of the Weissadlergasse; the Bockenheimer Pforte between the Holzgraben and the Hirschgraben; and the Bornheimer Pforte'at the northernmost point of the Fahrgasse.

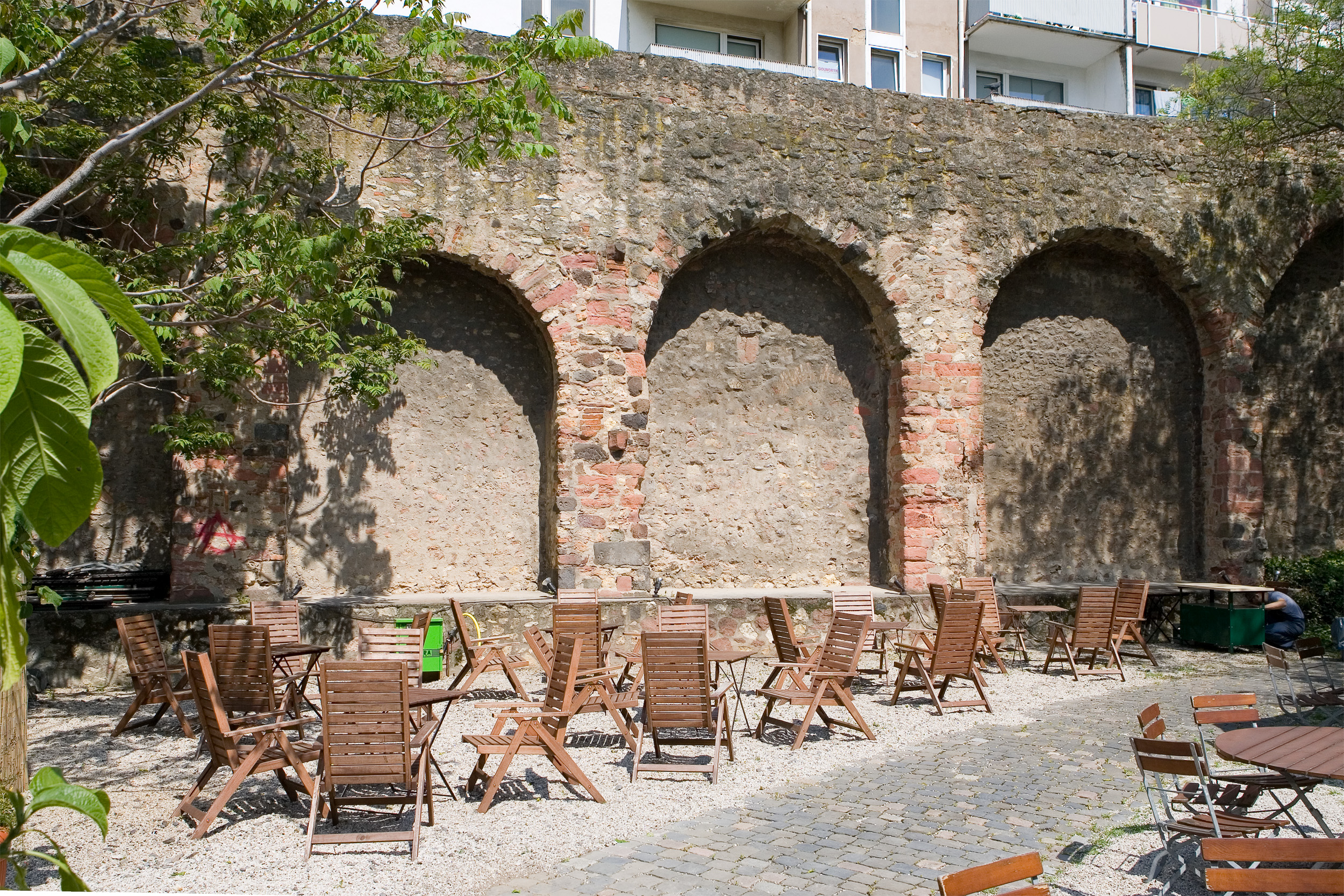
Parts of the Staufenmauer still exist today

The Guldenpforte was a round, undecorated tower with a conical roof. The Katharinenpforte consisted of two simple buildings, the outer gate and a stronger, cuboid inner tower with a high slate roof, a roof bay window and a roof lantern. In the seventeenth and eighteenth centuries, the Katharinenpforte was expensively renovated several times to maintain the prison located within it. Apparently, the building was especially well-suited for this usage. A notable prisoner was de:Susanna Margaretha Brandt, the historical prototype of Goethe's Gretchen. She spent the five months between her apprehension and her execution in the tower.

The Bornheim gate ("Bornheimer Pforte") was a double gate with a wide eastern opening for horse-drawn traffic and a narrower western gate for pedestrians. This gate had a cuboid tower with a high slate roof. It served as a prison from 1433, like its western counterpart. It was severely damaged in 1791 during the Großer Christenbrand.

There were also seven smaller entrances: the Mainzer Pforte at the Alte Mainzer Gasse; the Fischerfeldpforte east of the Main bridge; west of the bridge the Fischerpforte at the Grosse Fischergasse; the Metzgertor south of the Leinwandhaus; the Heilig-Geist-Pforte in the middle of the Saalgasse; the Fahrpforte at the later Fahrtor; the Holzpforte at the southern end of the Karpfengasse; and the Leonhardspforte at the Church of St. Leonhard. The smaller entrances, due to their size, have been accorded a diminutive label in colloquial speech: "Pförtchen" (gatelets). Their original appearance is not recorded, and they were considerably modified during the 15th century, before the first surviving pictures of the city were made.

The Staufenmauer was still being maintained after the second city expansion of 1333. Two round towers were constructed on top of the wall in the middle of the fourteenth century, at a time when the city was already constructing a new fortification. The Fronhofturm (Fronhof tower), named after a nearby farmyard, was located at the end of the Predigergasse; and the Mönchsturm (monk tower), named after the neighbouring Dominicans, was halfway between the choir of the Dominican church and the Steinernes Haus in the Judengasse ghetto. The towers were probably intended to protect the endangered wall corner at the Fischerfeld.

== Late-medieval city expansion ==
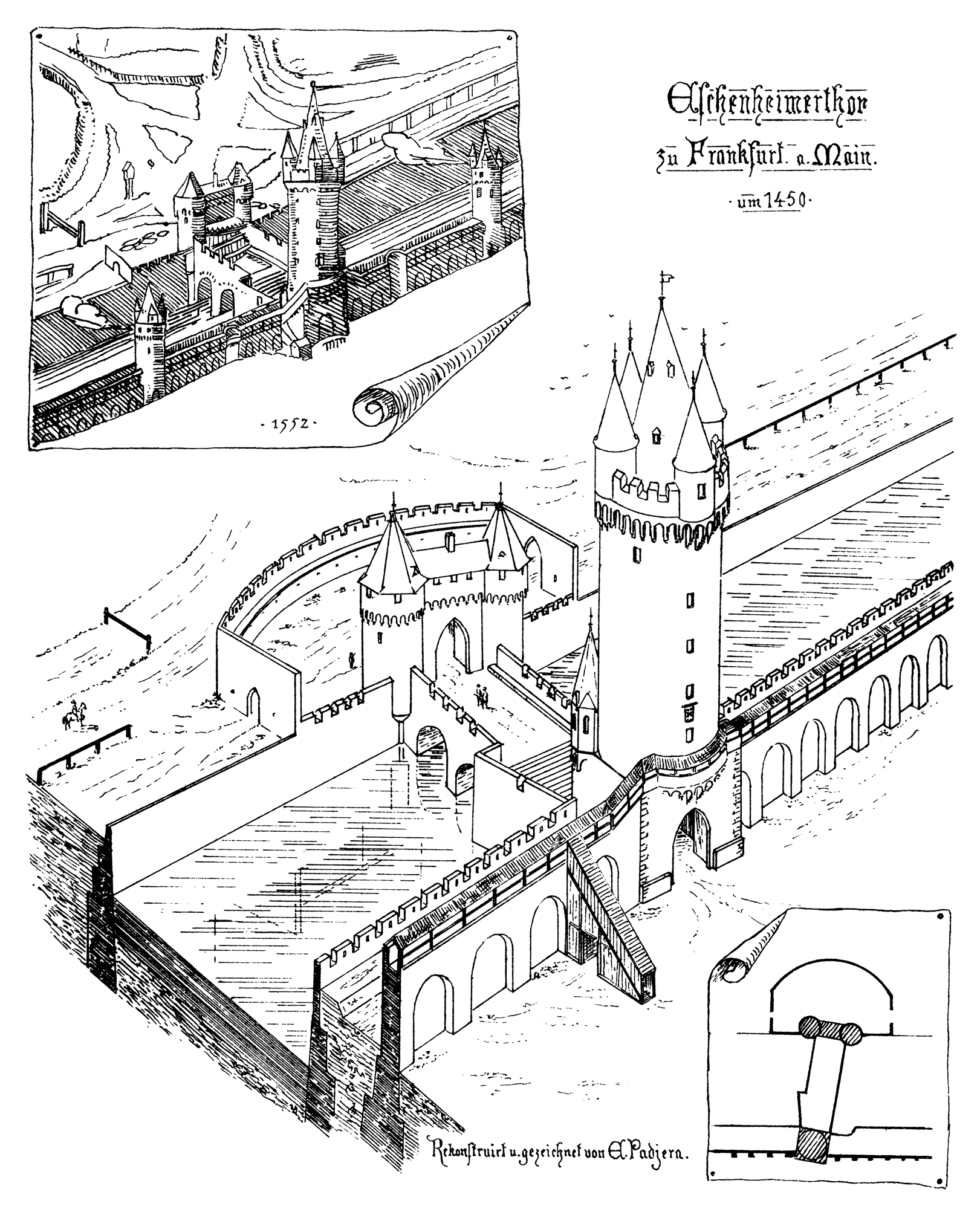
Eschenheimer Tor, an exemplary part of the new city wall

On 17 July 1333, Emperor Ludwig IV. authorised the second city expansion (Zweite Stadterweiterung) which tripled the previous area of the city. It took four centuries for the city's then population of 9,000 to grow enough for the whole Neustadt, in front of the Staufenmauer, to be built over. Notwithstanding, in 1343 the construction of a new city wall around the sparsely inhabited suburbs was started; it took over 100 years to complete, in several construction phases. The work initially went slowly and lacked an overall plan. The development of firearms seems to have caused an acceleration, with the whole fortification being finished by the beginning of the 16th century.

Similar to its predecessor, the new fortification started above the Alte Brücke, ran up to the Dominikanerkloster in the north, then to the east, and from there, followed the line of the Anlagenring. The course of the river wall did not change. For the first time, the Sachsenhausen suburbs south of the Main came within the protection of the wall. The wall was 6–8 metres (20–30 ft) high, and about 2.5–3 metres (8–10 ft) thick at the top. To reduce the amount of construction material required, the inner side of the wall – as with the Staufenmauer – was constructed with one-metre deep blind arches. At the top of the wall, there was a continuous chemin de ronde with a parapet that had a height of about two metres and was interrupted by merlons and embrasures. It was accessible via narrow, steep wooden stairs, or via stone spiral stairs, known as "snails" (Schnecken). The chemin de ronde, paved with stone slabs, was partially sheltered by a slate gable roof. Several guard houses were built on the unsheltered parts of the wall. One of these, the Salmensteinisches Haus, was built around 1350 in the area of the Rechneigrabenstrasse and in the 19th century it was copied by architects for the Kleiner Cohn, the small town hall tower.

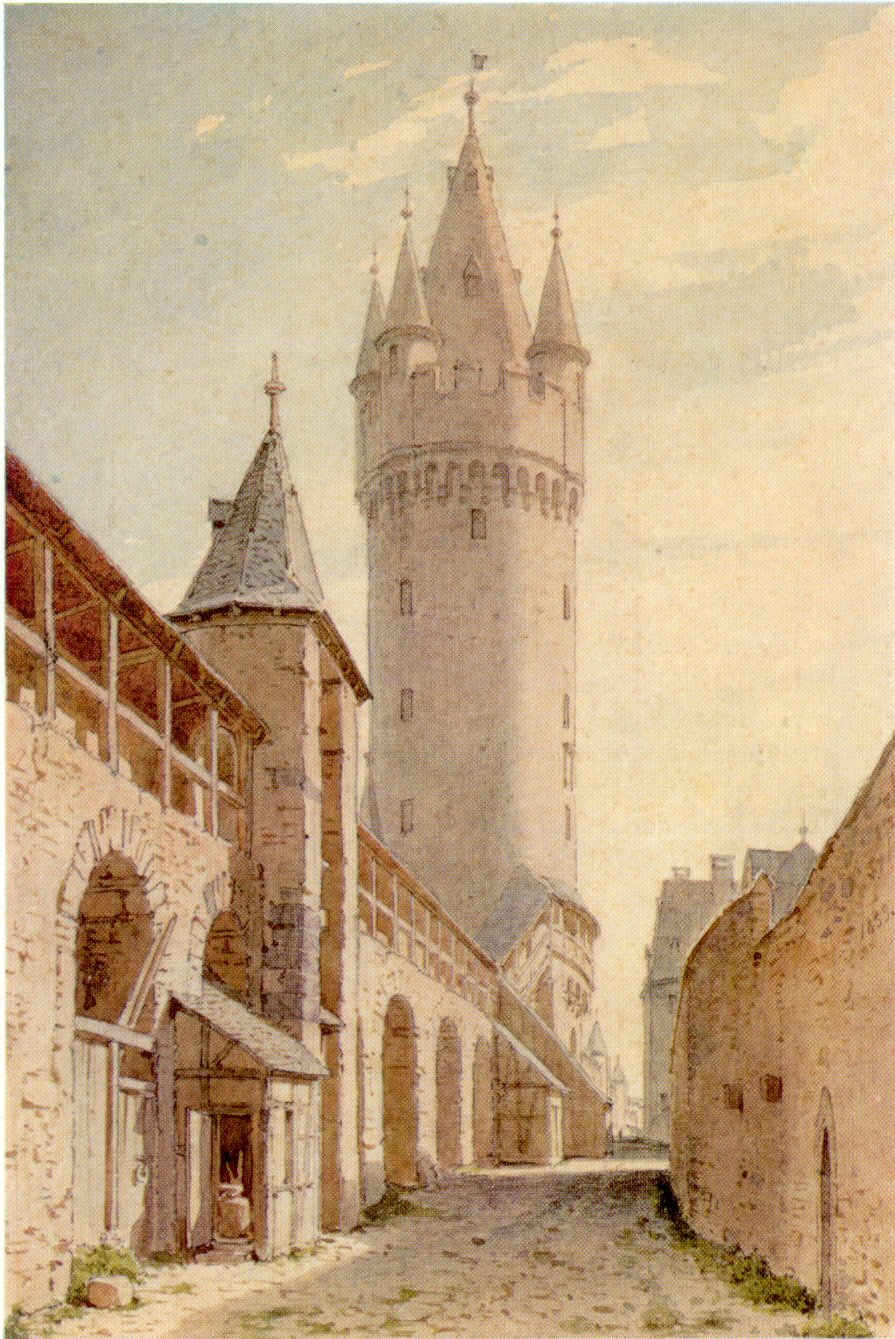
The zwinger between the walls

In front of and behind the wall there were 3–4 metres (10–10 ft) wide Zwingers – open kill zones between two defensive walls. In front of the outer Zwinger, there was an 8–10 metres (30–30 ft) wide wet moat fed by the Main and many smaller rivers, and had another, smaller, wall in front of it. The Rechneigrabenweiher in the Obermainanlage and the Bethmannweiher in the Bethmannpark still exist in the 21st century and are remnants of the moat. The wall had 55 towers, 40 of which have been located to the north of the Main, and 15 in Sachsenhausen. Most of the towers were added during the 15th century and were round and did not protrude on the outside of the wall. The chemin de ronde either passed through the towers or around them.

=== Gates and towers ===
The Landmauer contained only a few gates: in the west, the Galgentor; in the north-west, the Bockenheimer Tor; in the north, the Eschenheimer Tor; in the north-east, the Friedberger Tor; and in the east, the Allerheiligentor. On the Sachsenhausen side, there was only a single gate, the southern Affentor (ape gate). The towers of the gates were slightly stronger than normal towers, with one on each side of the moat with a Zwinger in-between, with the gates set into the towers. To improve the defence of the gates, most of the towers were offset against each other; only the Bockenheimer Tor and the Eschenheimer Tor had straight-line throughfares. There were openings in the vaults of the passages through the towers, and it was possible to pour soil and stones into the passage, making it impossible to pass.

The Galgentor (gallows' gate) was the most important gate; the traffic from and to Mainz passed through it. The emperors also preferred to enter the city via the Galgentor during their elections. The gate had cuboid towers, constructed between 1381 and 1392. On the outer faces, below gothic baldachins, statues of Bartholomew the Apostle and Charlemagne stood either side of a Reichsadler, which stood on a lion. One of the first towers was the Bockenheimer Tor, built between 1343 and 1346 The most important tower was the Eschenheimer Turm, constructed between 1400 and 1428 and still standing behind the eponymous city gate. It was the second tower to be built here. The foundation stone of its predecessor was laid in 1346. The Friedberger Tor is recorded to have existed in 1346, but its tower was constructed in 1380. The tower was cuboid and had a high, hipped roof with a roof lantern on the top. The construction date of the Allerheiligentor (All Hallows' Gate) is uncertain, with the sources giving dates from the 1340s to the 1380s. The Sachsenhäuser Tor (Sachsenhausen gate) was more compact than the gates north of the Main. At the top of the gate, there was a cuboid tower. After 1552, the gate gained roundels on two sides; after 1769, the roof of the gate gained a small baroque tower to accommodate the chiming clock of the broken Sachsenhäuser Brückenturm.

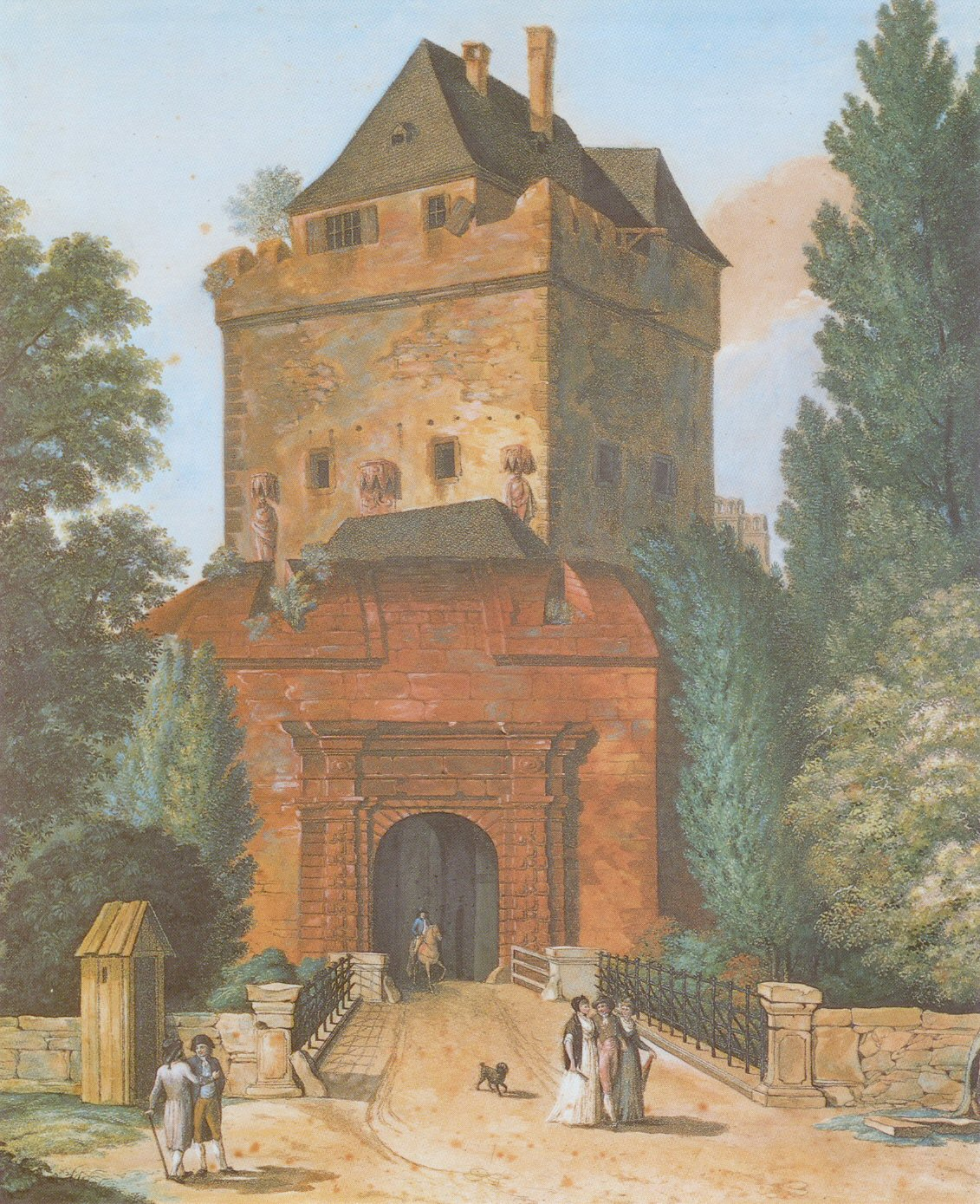
The Galgentor (gallows gate) was often considered to be the most beautiful and most important of the city's gates.

Especially important for the protection of the city was the defence of the bank of the River Main. At the downstream side, two massive towers, the Mainzer Turm ("tower of Mainz") on the north bank and the Ulrichstein on the south, guarded the river. Upstream, swampy fishing fields prevented direct access to the city wall, while the Sachsenhausen riverbank between the city wall and the Main bridge was protected by a wall with five large towers and was only passable through six gates. The bridge itself was protected by two bridge towers. Their gates were closed at night. The towers were destroyed by flood and ice flow on 1 February 1306, but were rapidly rebuilt. In July 1342 the less massive Sachsenhäuser Brückenturm (Sachsenhausen bridge tower) was damaged again by floods but was rebuilt between 1345 and 1380. The main entrance at the Main river bank was marked by the Rententurm, remnants of which today form part of the historical museum.

The Frankfurter Brückenturm (bridge tower of Frankfurt) was constructed between 1306 and 1342. It served as a prison, and the torture chamber was moved there from the Katharinenpforte in 1693. The cuboid tower had a very steep hipped slate roof with large dormers and an ogival thoroughfare at ground level. While the edges of the tower exposed ashlars, the sides of the tower were plastered and decoratively shaped. The form of the decoration varied over the centuries according to contemporary taste. The Sachsenhausen Brückenturm was also cuboid and had an ogival thoroughfare at ground level. It had a chemin de ronde which protruded in the form of a lombard band' with small polygonal corner towers. In a tribute to its style, at the beginning of the 20th century a new tower, the Langer Franz, became a part of the new town hall.

=== Landwehr ===
By the mid-fourteenth century, at the time of the second city expansion, Frankfurt had a sizeable rural district. In 1372, the city became a free imperial city after paying Emperor Charles IV 8,800 guilder; it bought the Frankfurt City Forest, a 1,800 hectares (4,400 acres) area of the imperial forest for a further 8,800 guilders.

In early 1393 plans to mark the border of the city's territory with a ditch and a thick hedge – a traditional form of demarcation known as a landwehr (land defence) – were developed. In 1396 and 1397 the landwehr was constructed from the Riederhöfe to the Knoblauchshof. Two wooden observation towers were also built. These actions caused local ill feeling and the city council obtained a privilege from King Wenceslaus IV of Bohemia on 13 January 1398. This permitted the city to construct moats, landwehrs and towers in and around Frankfurt and Sachsenhausen at their own discretion. The landwehr encompassed the city at a distance of three to four kilometres, approximately marking the political boundaries of the city. The ditch was outermost, with the hedge nearest the city. Later, a second ditch was dug along the western part of the landwehr.

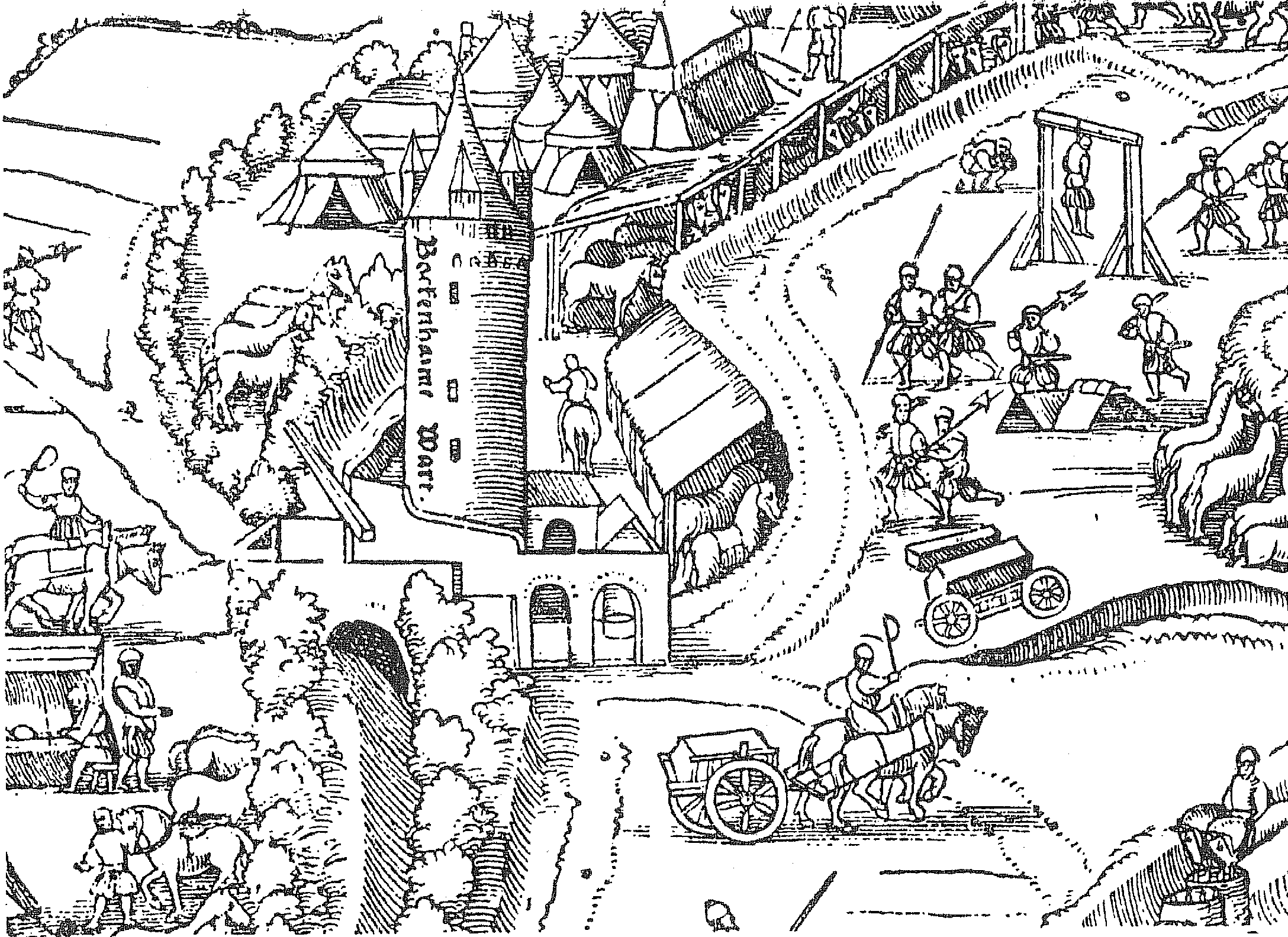
The Landwehr at the Bockenheimer Warte, 1552

The area between the city wall and the landwehr consisted mainly of agricultural land. Directly in front of the city, there were vegetable plots and vineyards. These were farmed according to the flurzwang rules – similar to a medieval three-field crop rotation system. Between were small woods and meadows such as the Knoblauchsfeld and the Friedberger Feld; the latter was important for the water supply of the city. A wooden water supply pipe connected the Friedberger Feld to the Friedberger Tor from 1607. A circle of fortified farmyards surrounded the city.

In 1414 parts of the landwehr were rebuilt in stone. These measures attracted the attention and displeasure of Werner von Falkenstein, archbishop of the Trier, lord of Königstein and count of Castle Hayn. The city council referred to the privilege obtained from Wenceslaus and asked him for help. Subsequently they also asked Sigismund, the German king and future Holy Roman Emperor, for assistance. Sigismund personally examined one of the towers and confirmed Frankfurt's privileges. Notwithstanding, the archbishop ordered the destruction of part of the landwehr and a tower in 1416. King Sigismund, who was in London at time of the destruction, urged the archbishop to behave peacefully, and asked the city council to wait for his return to Germany to make a decision. After Werner's death in 1418 the city council ordered the reconstruction and completion of the Landwehr, which took place between 1420 and 1429. Between 1434 and 1435 an additional tower was constructed; and another between 1470 and 1471.

During the 15th century Frankfurt acquired several villages and the Landwehr was extended accordingly to enclose them. Fearing resistance to this, especially from Philipp I, Count of Hanau-Münzenberg, they asked for confirmation of their landwehr privilege and on occasion organised large parties to dig extensions of the Landwehr in secret and under armed guard. Only the five largest arterial roads allowed passage through the landwehr, each protected by towers. In the 16th century, the effectiveness of the landwehr was repeatedly put to the test. In 1517, during the autumn fair, Franz von Sickingen ambushed a convoy of merchant vehicles within the landwehr, stealing seven trading vehicles from Frankfurt.

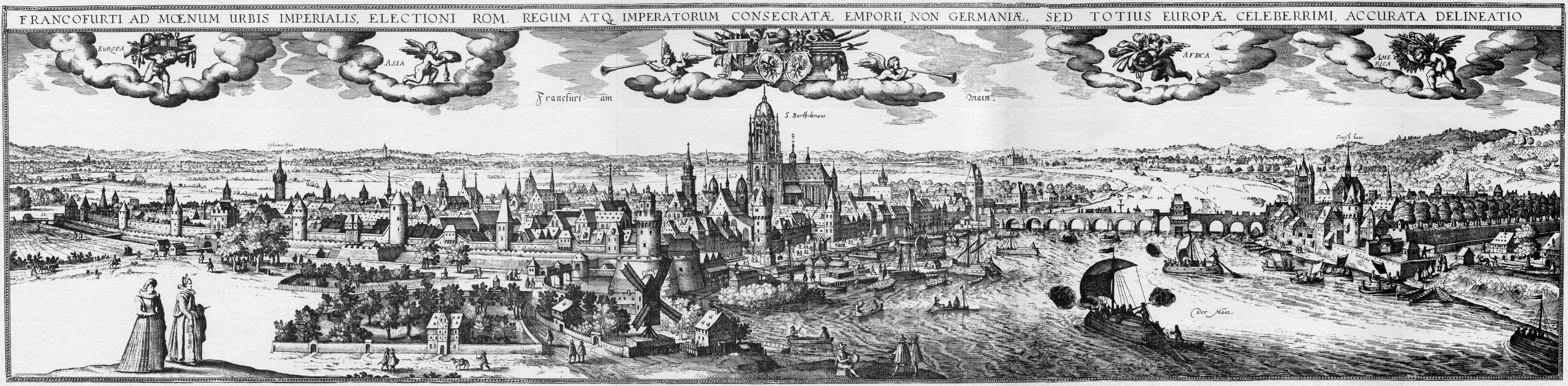
Frankfurt, seen from south-west, with its medieval fortification and the minor improvements of 1552. Chalcography, created approximately 1617/18, before 1619, by Matthäus Merian the Elder.

== Military effectiveness ==
Shortly after the completion of its construction in the sixteenth century, the city wall was already militarily and technically obsolete. It had been designed as protection against medieval weapons and was inadequate against the developing technology of gunpowder cannon which rendered medieval stone fortifications obsolete. In response Frankfurt's city wall was selectively upgraded with bastions and roundels.

From 28 to 30 August 1546, during the Schmalkaldic War, troops of the Schmalkaldic League defending of the city forced the emperor's troops to retreat from their attacks on the landwehr.

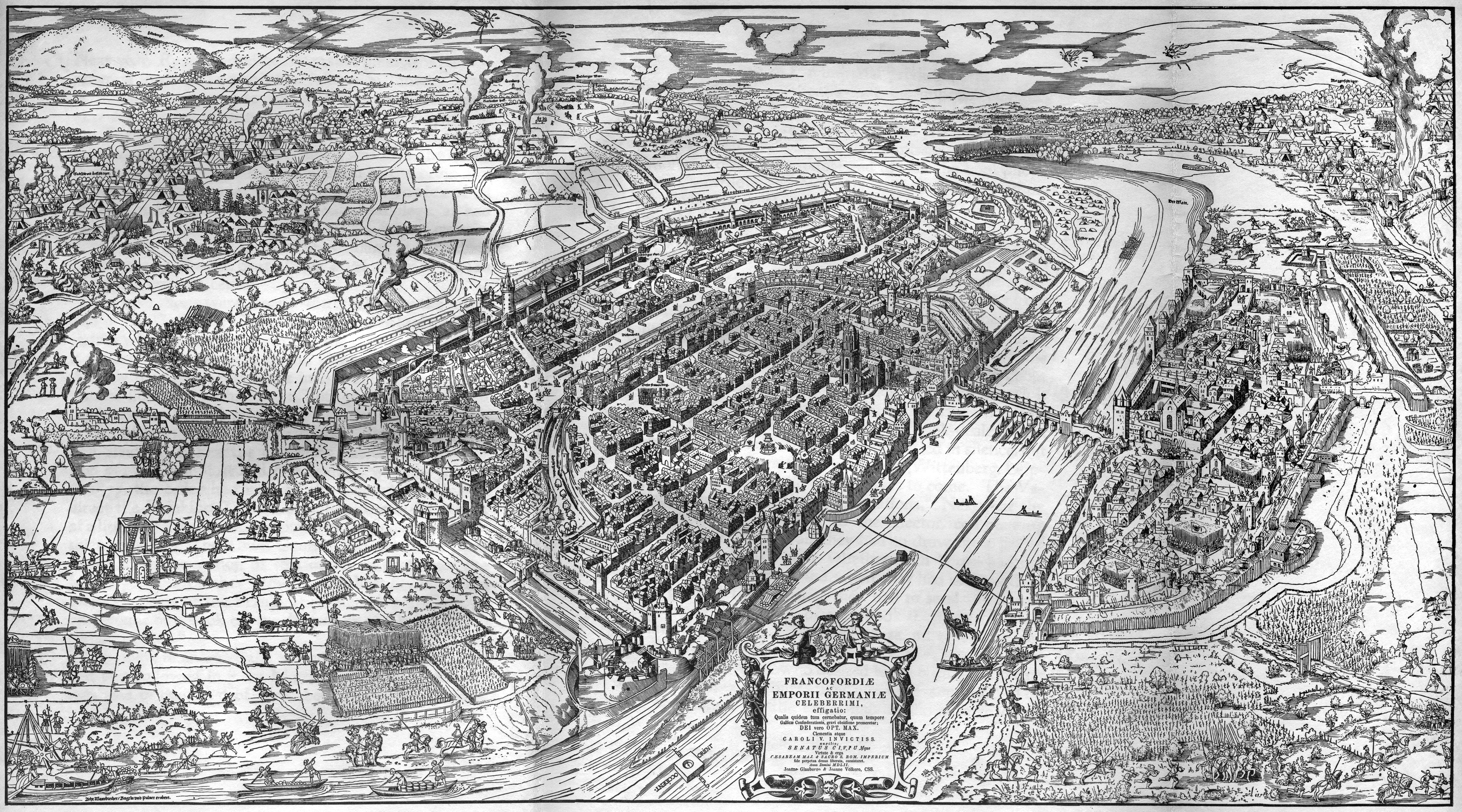
The siege of 1552 put the fortification to the test.

The fortifications of Frankfurt endured their most significant test in July 1552. During the Second Schmalkaldic War, Protestant troops under the command of Maurice, Elector of Saxony, broke through the landwehr and they set up camp directly in front of the city wall. Today's city names Im Sachsenlager ("in the Saxon camp") and Im Trutz Frankfurt in the west of the city are reminders of this event. The city for was besieged for three weeks. The city was successfully protected by troops of the Catholic emperor under the command of Conrad von Hanstein, due to a resolute defence by numerous cannon. To achieve this victory, Hanstein ordered rapid improvements in the fortifications: the creation of makeshift bastions; and the demolition of the gothic spires on the Bockenheimer and Friedberger gate that had blocked the line of fire of the defence's artillery. The Peace of Passau, proclaimed by Charles IV, ended the siege. The landwehr was rebuilt and several damaged towers were repaired after the siege and several makeshift bastions expanded, for example at the so-called Judeneck south of the Allerheiligentor (all hallows' gate).

Despite the peace, Frankfurt was repeatedly threatened, especially by Kronberg's knights and the lords of Hanau, who wished to keep the ambitious imperial city Frankfurt in its place. In 1380, the knights united in the Löwenbund; the imperial cities formed a counter-union in the Rhenish League of Towns. In the Battle of Eschborn on 14 May 1389, the city was resoundingly defeated by Kronberg and its allies from Hanau, Hattstein and Reifenberg.

== Bastion fortifications ==
=== Threat of the Thirty Years' War ===
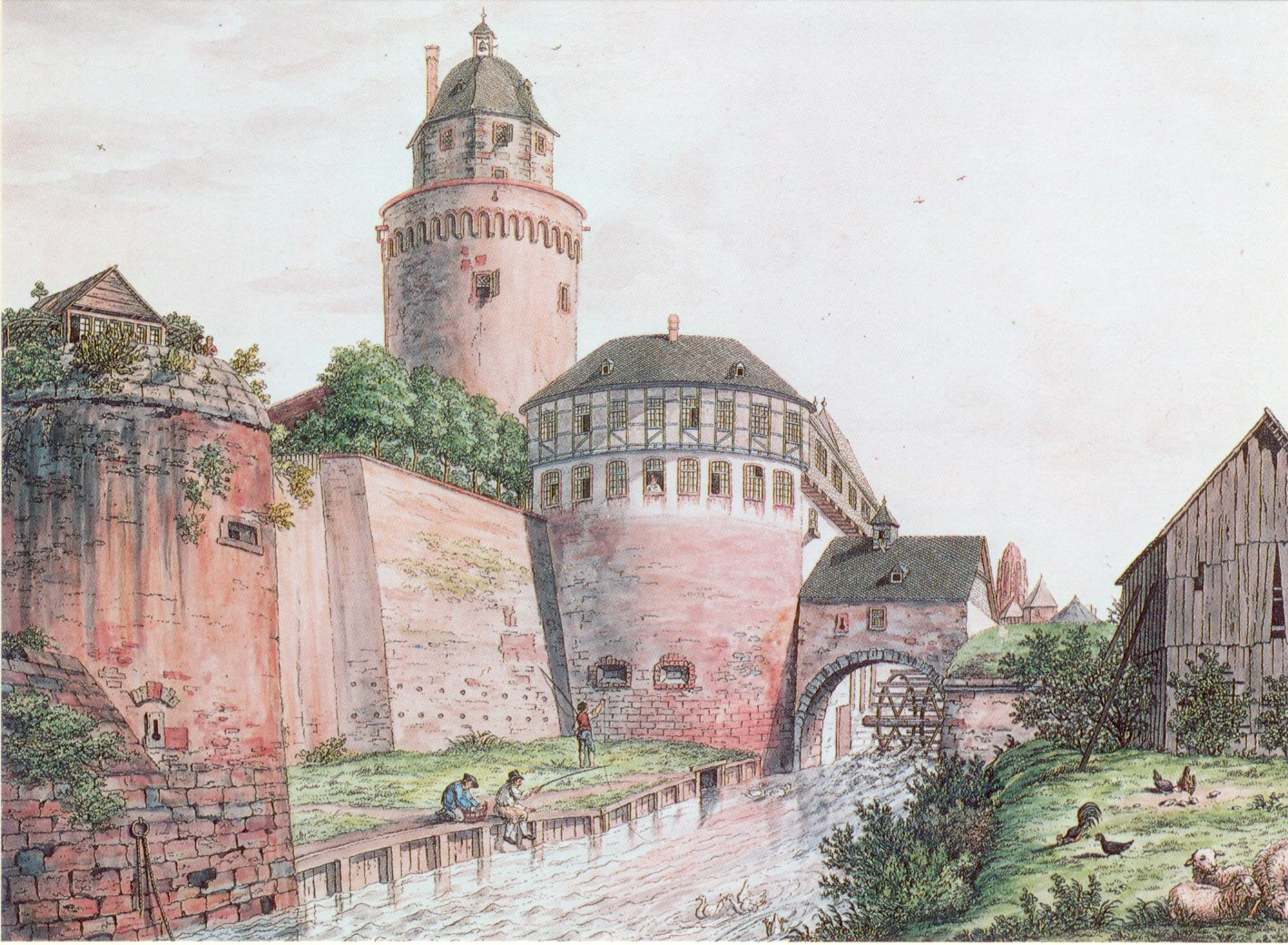
The Mainzer Bollwerk (bulwark of Mainz) was the strongest bastion of the city wall.

After successfully overcoming the siege of 1552, Frankfurt was not threatened again for fifty years; during which the city saw no reason to improve its fortifications. Military leaders asked for stronger protection, but the city council was unconvinced. In 1618, the Thirty Years' War began causing the city council to consult the engineer Adam Stapf, who was working as a fortress architect in Mannheim. He submitted a plan to the council, with a cost estimate of 149,000 guilder, calling for eighteen hollow bastions to be created: thirteen north of the Main, and five to the south. To save money, instead of curtain walls, the plan suggested banking up earth behind the existing Medieval stone wall, making it usable as a breastwork. The city council rejected the plan on the grounds of cost. However, as the war continued the council contacted Stapf again in 1621. Stapf, now working in Heidelberg, presented a new plan: the medieval fortification was to be left in place, and outside it a new fortification was to be constructed with thirteen bastions and twelve linking curtain walls. Stapf estimated the cost at 159,600 guilder. On 10 May 1621 the city council considered it likely that the war would end soon, and again rejected Stapf's plan.

On 20 June 1622 more than 40,000 soldiers of the Protestant Union and the Catholic League faced each other close to the city in the Battle of Höchst. After the retreat of the Protestant troops, the city was compelled to be deal with the Catholic victor, despite the populace's Lutheran confession. In order to retain their imperial privileges and avoid involvement in the war, Frankfurt began a policy of benevolent neutrality and rebuffed all offers of alliance. It was considered that a demonstration of military strength was an essential part of this strategy. The engineer and master builder Eberhard Burck was commissioned for two years to improve the fortifications. Following his recommendation, the city council also commissioned Steffan Krepel of Forchheim to design new walls. Burck drew up a plan, focused on cost reduction, whereby Frankfurt would receive six bastions, and Sachsenhausen three; as in Stapf's first plan, the old Zwingermauer was to be reused. In the event, only one of Burck's suggestions was implemented: protecting the east of Sachsenhausen with a roundel. The city council delayed further and in February 1625 Burck was dismissed.

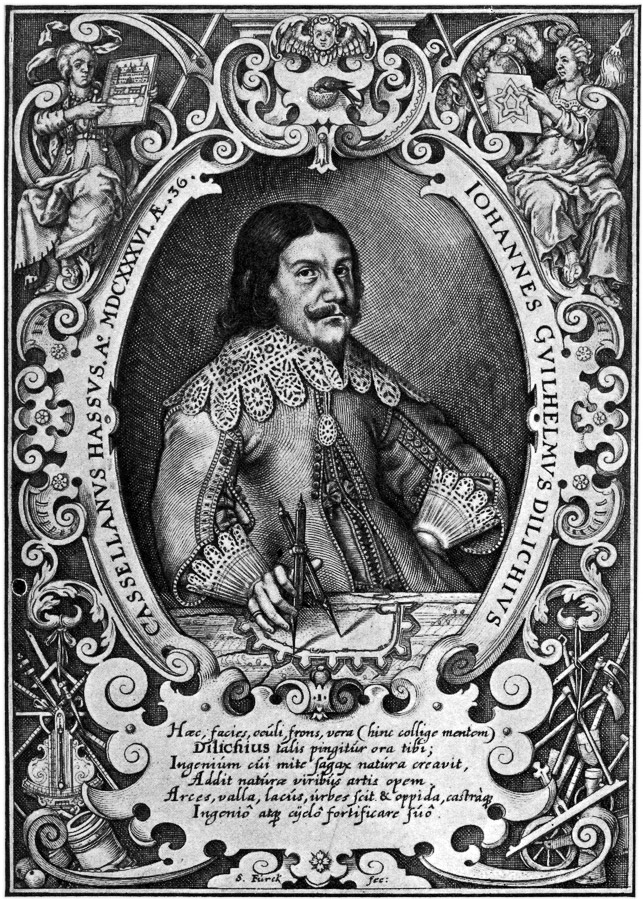
Johann Wilhelm Dilich, 1636

Renowned fortress architect Johann Wilhelm Dilich, working in Kassel at the time, sent a letter to the council on 16 December 1624, offering his services. The council, believing that there was currently no need for such measures due to a lack of military threats, ignored it. When the army of Albrecht von Wallenstein left Bohemia marching towards Franconia and Hesse Mayor Johann Martin Baur von Eyssene mentioned Frankfurt-born former sea captain Johann Adolf von Holzhausen as a possible fortress architect. The city council commissioned Holzhausen to improve the Friedberger Tor (gate of Friedberg), which was considered to be the weakest part of the fortifications. Holzhausen produced a plan for the construction of a ravelin, an independent bastion, in front of the gate. In late-1626 construction began, but problems arose due to Holzhausen's lack of experience. As previously anticipated by Dilich, the outer wall was too weak to support the construction of a parapet behind it. Parts of the wall shattered and fell into the moat.

=== Commission of Johann Wilhelm Dilich ===
The city council then turned to the engineer Wilhelm Dilich for help. He arrived in Frankfurt with his son, Johann Wilhelm Dilich, in 1627 to gain an overview of the situation. He dismissed any reuse of the old fortifications. As Stapf had, he recommended creating a regular, circular fortification some distance outside the existing walls. As this would have required the city to purchase additional land, the idea was rejected. Four further proposals with walls closer to the city were produced and all were considered to be too expensive, so father and son departed in early April.

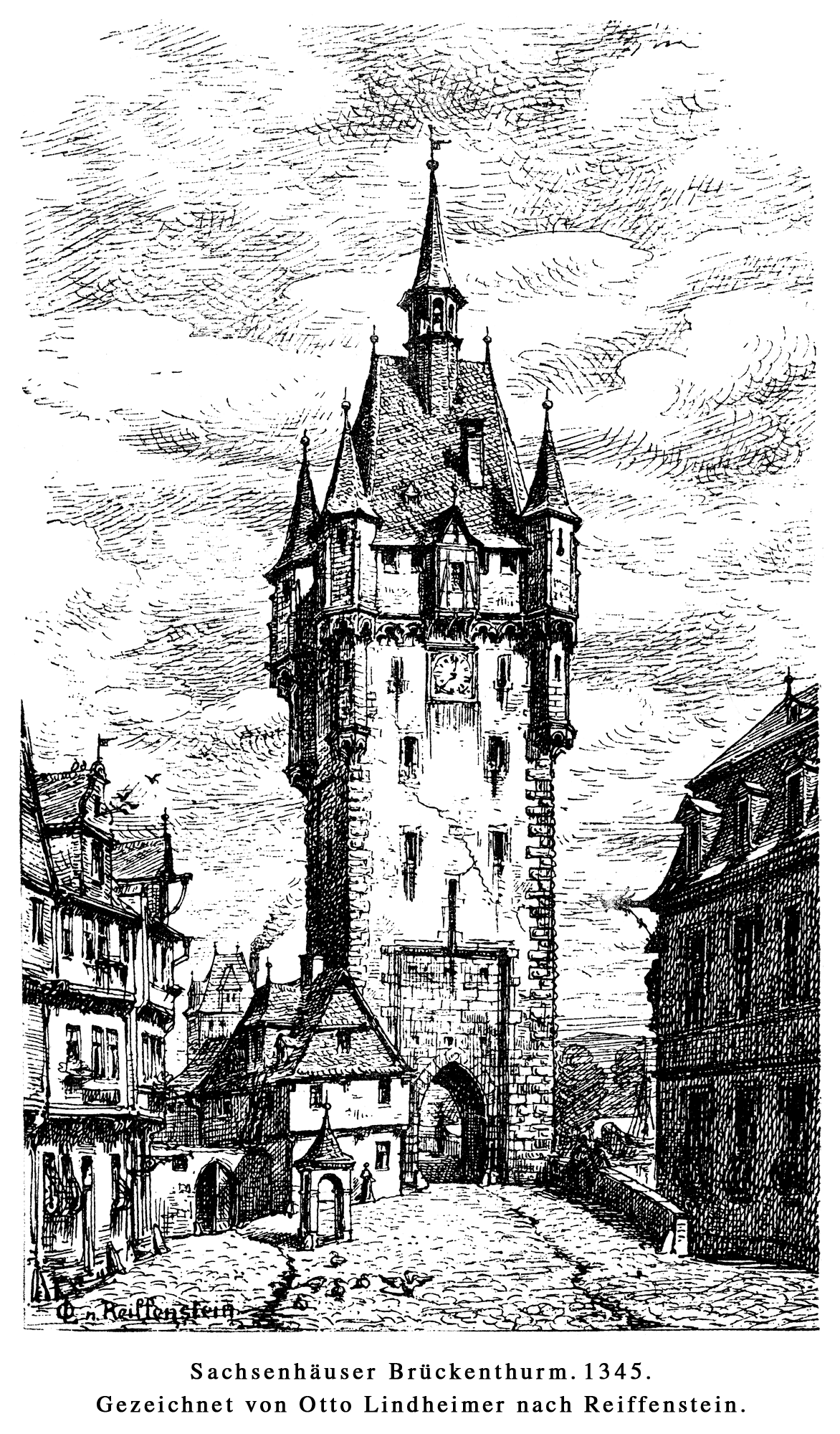
Sachsenhäuser Brückenturm

In the middle of 1627 Holzhausen's ravelin collapsed completely and Holzhausen, apparently in despair, appealed to the city council to commission the younger Dilich. Dilich accepted, returned, and was given his commission on 8 January 1628. Dilich received a municipal salary of 448 guilder per year. In a council meeting on 22 February, a contentious debate ensued regarding his plans to considerably extend the fortifications. Again this was rejected, but Dilich was allowed to improve the old city wall at its weakest places, by constructing two bulwarks in front of the Eschenheimer Tor (gate of Eschenheim) and the Friedberger Tor, using the material from the collapsed ravelin. To hedge the project against political concerns, during the cornerstone ceremony on 16 June 1628, mayor Baur solemnly declared that the new fortification was not directed against the emperor or empire, but rather meant to protect the loyal city.

In mid-1629 further false economy by the city council led to another collapse of large parts of the wall while under construction. To avoid damaging the fields, Dilich had been required to build on the old moat, where it was not possible to create adequate foundations. During the subsequent investigation, Dilich, Nikolaus Mattheys from Mannheim who had been commissioned as a wall master on Dilich's recommendation, and the craftspeople involved cast the blame on each other. According to Dilich, the wall master had spent more time drinking than doing his job, and the construction workers had supposedly snarled at Dilich. Mattheys was dismissed and replaced by Johann Zimmermann from Mainz. No offence was proven against the craftspeople, and Dilich's commission was upheld.

An external reviewer, the fortress architect and mathematician Johannes Faulhaber from Ulm, was called in. He pointed out the already-known problems, but also noted additional errors in Dilich's plans, and openly rebuffed him in front of the city council. Faulhaber delivered a stern lecture, establishing his views via algebraic calculations and a paper model. After Faulhaber left the city in March 1630, Dilich followed his recommendations, causing the construction works to make good progress. By June, the collapse damage had been made good. Up to 600 people worked on the wall. In 1631, master builder Matthias Staudt from Darmstadt was assigned to be Dilich's assistant. The citizenry were required to pay an exceptional tax for the construction of the wall. They also were conscripted for compulsory labour.

=== Fortifications ===
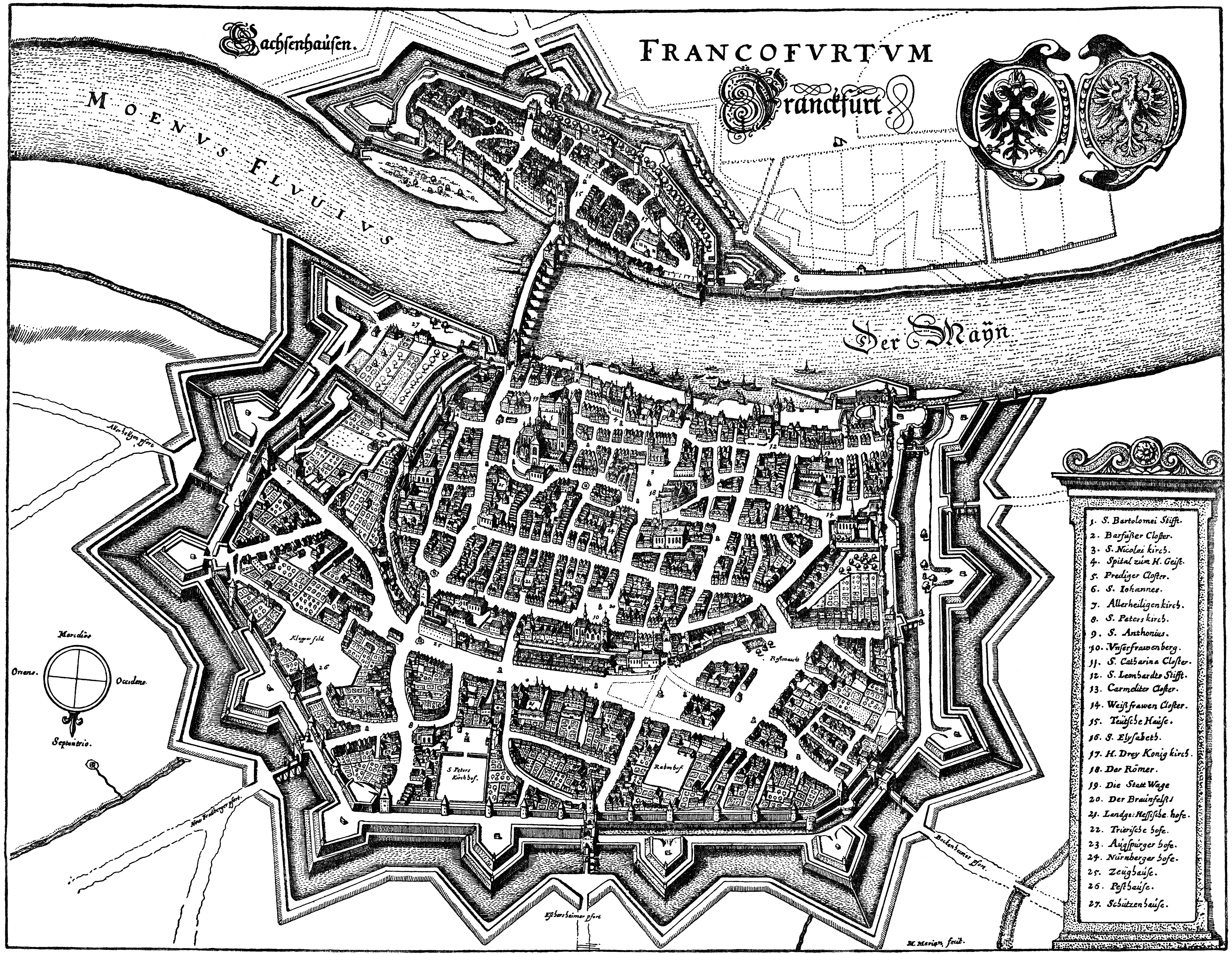
Frankfurt, 1645

Dilich utilised a fortification style known as Dutch fortress architecture, an enhanced successor of Italian fortress architecture. The main advantage over the old construction style was that Dutch-style earth walls, contrary to Italian-style stone walls, were less susceptible to cannonball damage. He kept the old walls in place and created new moats approximately 30 metres (100 ft) away. He used the evacuated soil to create an earth wall in front of the stonework. A drawing by Dilich shows his construction style: from the inside to the outside there were an outer ward between the walls; the stone walls; the earth rampart; the fortified breastwork; at its base the Faussebraye with another breastwork; then the escarpe wall; the wet moat; the contrescarpe; and finally a glacis, partially palisaded on top. The pentagonal bastions enabled defenders to rake the glacis and the wall front with artillery fire. This style was built between the Eschenheimer Tor (gate of Eschenheim) and the Allerheiligentor (all hallows' gate) with the line of the new fortifications 15 metres (50 ft) from the old wall. This preserved the original medieval wall with the moat behind it. This meant that there was a wet moat on both sides of the fortification, rendering the walls accessible only by a limited number of bridges.

Dilich's work was brought to a halt in December 1631 due to a shortage of money. However, when the Swedish army entered the city on 20 November under King Gustavus Adolphus, they insisted that the construction work continue. The Swedish town commandant ordered his soldiers to assist with the work. Beginning in May 1632, three new bulwarks were constructed: The bulwark at the Breiter Wall (wide wall), also called the Schwedenbollwerk (Swedes' bulwark); the Bauernbollwerk (farmers' bulwark) at the Eschenheimer Tor (gate of Eschenheim), which was a result of compulsory labour by farmers from Frankfurt's villages; and the city militia constructed the Bockenheimer Bollwerk (bulwark of Bockenheim) at the Bockenheimer Tor (gate of Bockenheim). When it became known in August 1632 that the Emperor's army was approaching, the construction of three further bulwarks began. Tensions escalated on 1 August 1635 when Swedish troops in Sachsenhausen attempted to gain control over the city. In turn, the city council allowed the emperor's troops, to enter the city from the north. Entrenched in both parts of the city, severe battles ensued, causing enormous damage. Among other collateral damage, the Brückenmühle (bridge mill) and almost the entire Löhergasse in Sachsenhausen was destroyed. On 10 August the Swedes were granted safe conduct with military honours and left in the direction of Gustavsburg.

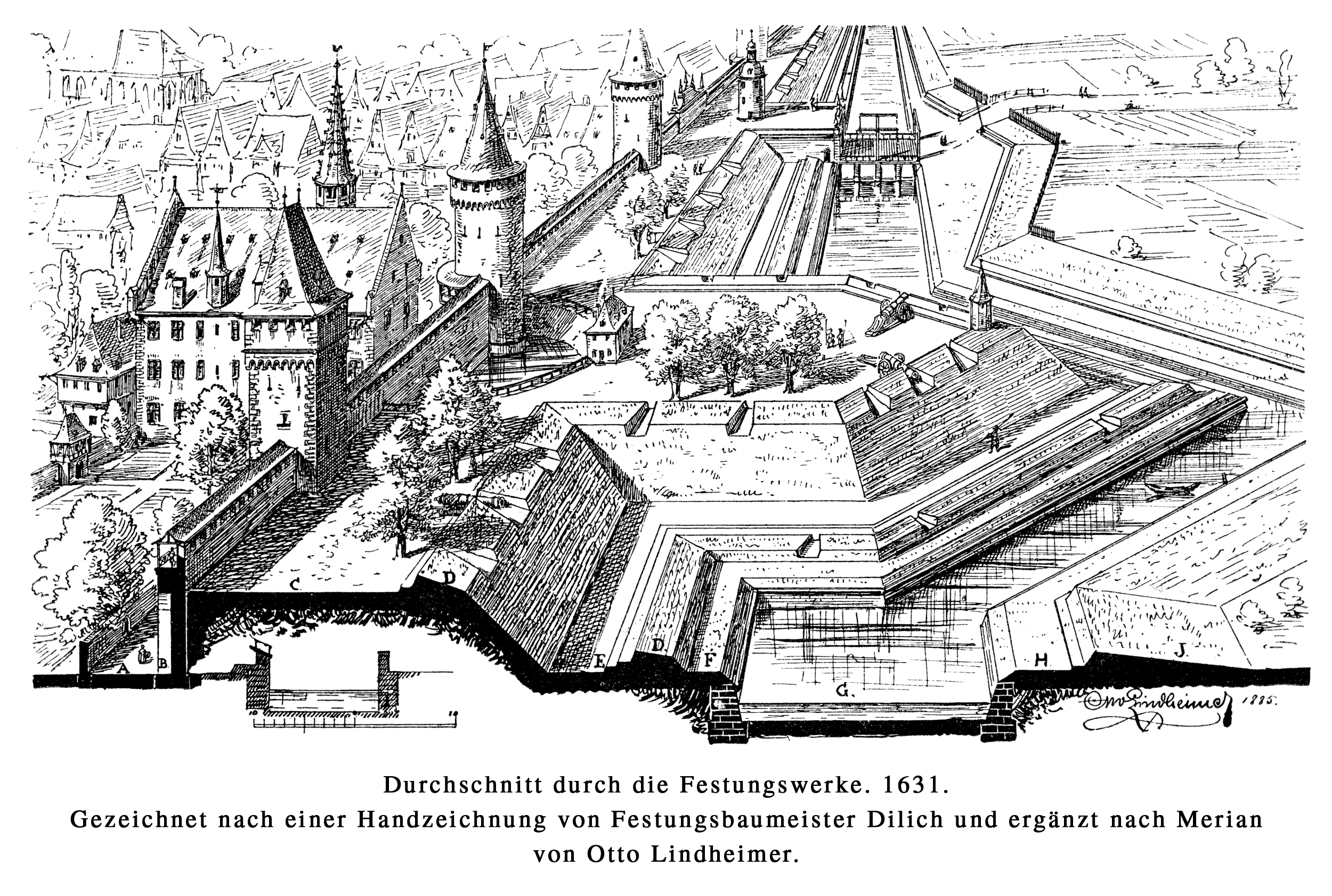
Hand drawing by Dilich, 1631

Further expansion of the fortifications dragged on until long after the end of the war in 1648. The digging of the moats and the basic foundation of the bulwarks and the curtain walls was largely completed by 1645. Work then focused on the construction of the outer moat revetment wall and the raising of the field breastwork. When Dilich died in 1660, Andreas Kiesser continued the work. In 1667, 49 years after the beginning of the construction, the work was essentially complete. North of the Main, a total of eleven bastions now surrounded the city, while the smaller Sachsenhausen was protected by five bastions. Because some of the bastions had been raised directly in front of the gates, these also had to be modified or reconstructed. The construction of the new fortifications was a severe burden on the city's finances.

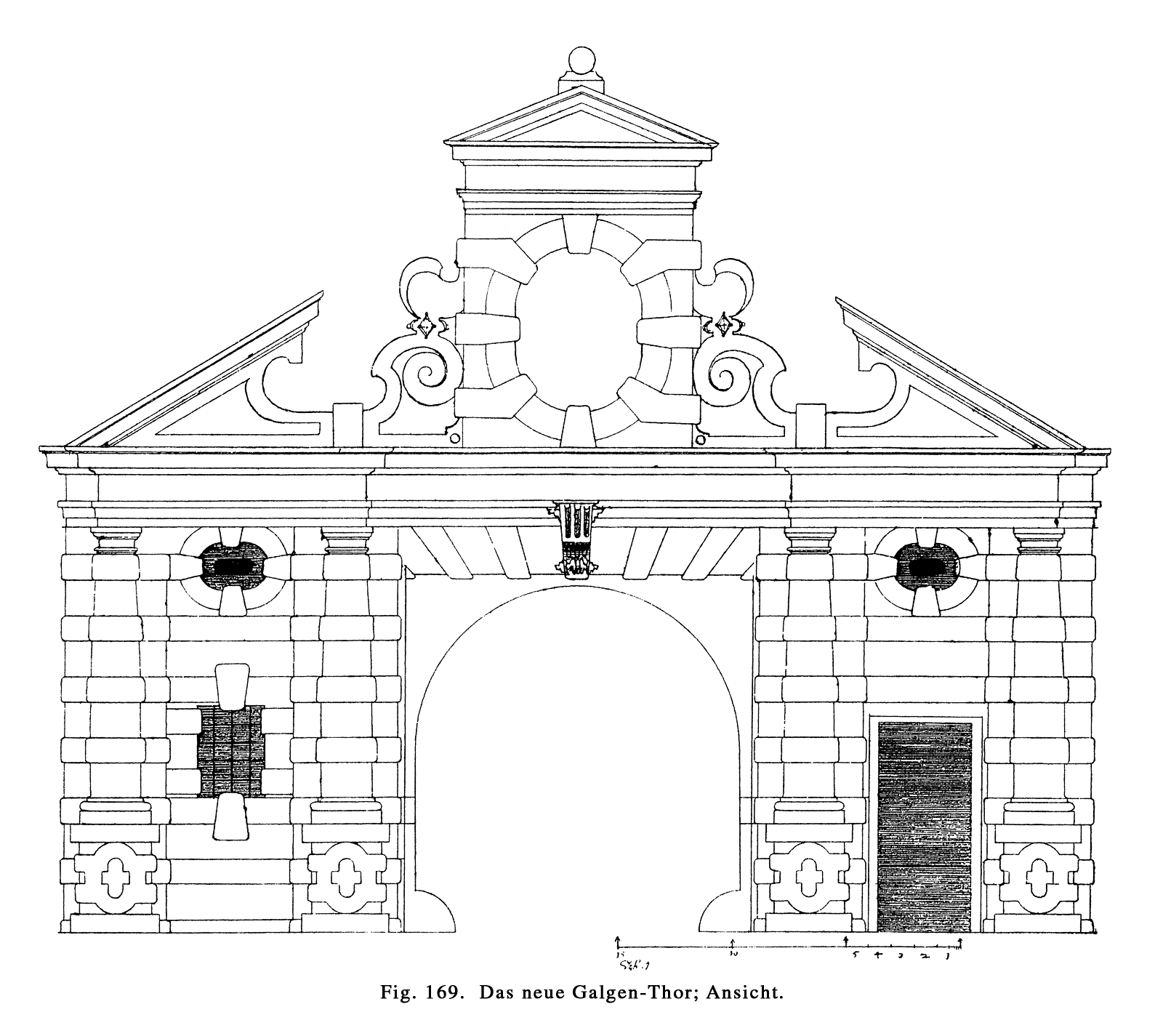
Draft of a gate in front of the Neues Galgentor, around 1650

The eleven bastions, from east to west, were named: Fischerfeldbollwerk (fishers' field bulwark, construction started in 1632); Allerheiligen or Judenbollwerk (all hallows' bulwark or Jews' bulwark, construction started in 1632); Schwedenschanze or Breitwallbollwerk (Swedes' sconce or wide wall bulwark, construction started in 1632); Pestilenzbollwerk (pestilence bulwark, construction started in 1631); Friedberger Bollwerk (bulwark of Friedberg, construction started in 1628); Eschenheimer Bollwerk (bulwark of Eschenheim, construction started in 1631), Bauernbollwerk (farmers' bulwark, construction started in 1632); Bockenheimer Bollwerk (bulwark of Bockenheim, construction started in 1632); Jungwallbollwerk (young wall bulwark, construction started in 1632), Galgenbollwerk (gallows' bulwark, construction started in 1635), and Mainzerbollwerk or Schneidwallbollwerk (bulwark of Mainz or sawmill bulwark, construction started in 1635, work restarted almost from scratch in 1663). Around Sachsenhausen, there were the Tiergartenbollwerk (zoological garden bulwark, construction started in 1635); the Hohes Werk (high bulwark, construction started in 1648, completed in 1665); the Hornwerk (horn bulwark, construction started 1631, reconstructed in its final appearance in 1665 and 1666); the Oppenheimer Bollwerk (bulwark of Oppenheim, likely built in a crescent shape around 1635 and later enlarged); and the Schaumainkaibollwerk (river view quay, a crescent-shaped construction in 1639, converted to its final form in 1667).

=== Maintenance ===
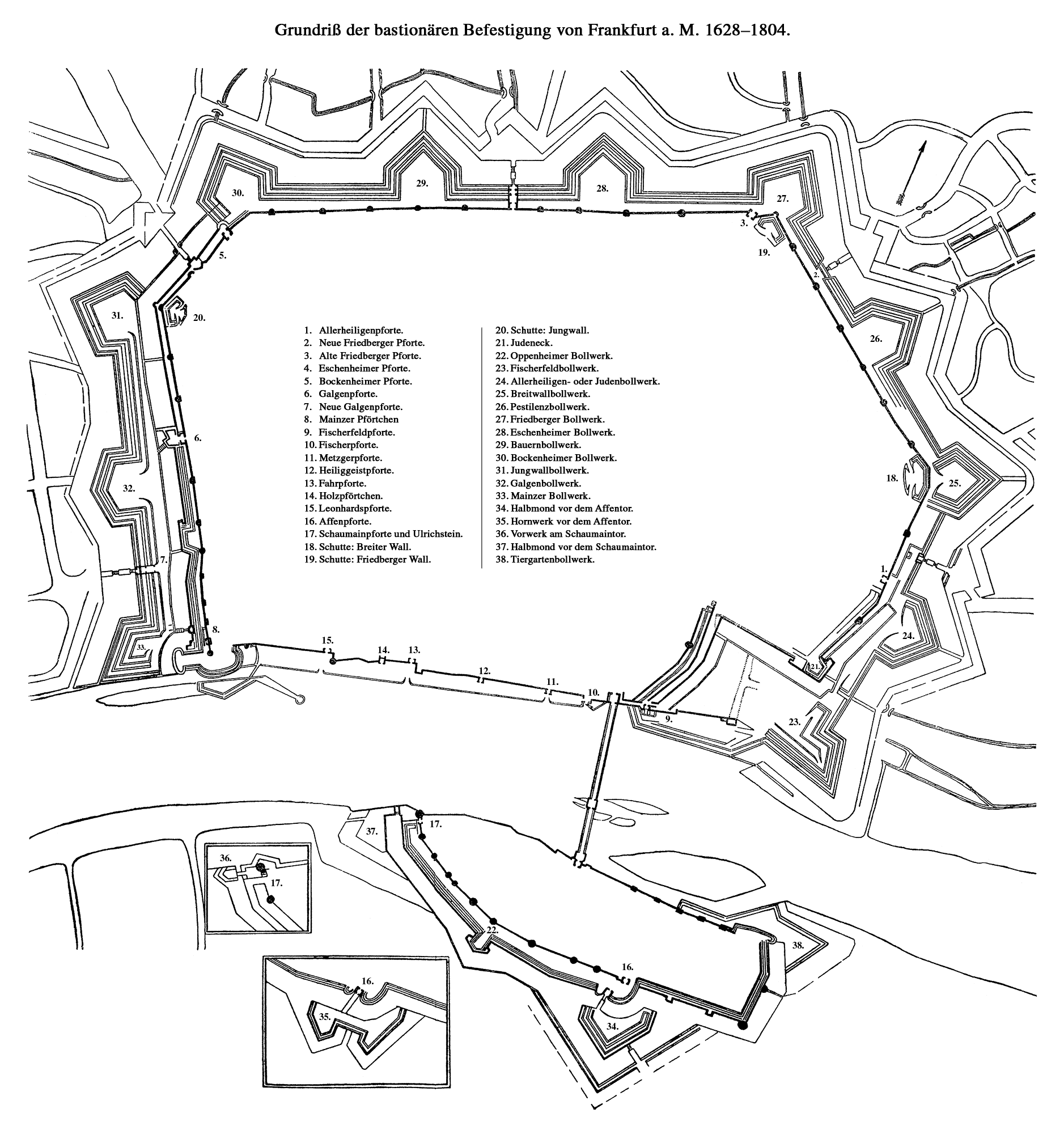
Schema of the completed bastionary fortification

The fortifications required regular, expensive, maintenance and repair. Much of this was because of the faulty and hasty nature of their original construction. The first section of the fortification had been built on swampy ground instead of the lowest point of the lower Main riverbank, where draining the incoming water would have been a trivial task. In nearly all bulwarks this resulted in fundamental structural damage that was almost impossible to repair properly. The city council repeatedly allocated less funding than the engineers requested, leading to the repair work also being inadequate. To make matters worse there was a lack of professional expertise to correctly assess the required depth of the foundations. In addition, there were fundamental design faults:The shoulders of the bastions were perpendicular to the middle wall, forming a square angle instead of an obtuse angle; the latter was required for them to mutually rake the moat in front of each other in the event of an attack. The merlons were incorrectly constructed on the front of the bulwarks instead of the center of the middle walls. The resulting blind angles would have allowed attackers to unopposedly bombard the city from the Mühlberg or the Affenstein, as they had in 1552.

At the end of the sixteenth century, large parts of the wall were deconstructed, as shown on the bird's-eye view by Matthäus Merian of 1628. In 1583, a large section of the wall south west of the Katharinenpforte was demolished; in 1589, a breakthrough was made at the northern end of the Fahrgasse; and in 1590 a similar breakthrough was made while connecting the Hasengasse to the Zeil. In the same year, the Guldenpforte was demolished; as was the Bornheimer Pforte shortly after 1765. In 1790, the Katharinenpforte was deconstructed; in 1793, the Fronhofturm (Fronhof tower). In 1795, large parts of the Mönchturm (monk tower) were deconstructed. The latter, previously used for gunpowder storage, had almost caused a disaster when a fire broke out in it; as a consequence, it had been unused since. The clock of the Bornheimer Pforte was moved to the tower of the armoury at the Konstablerwache in 1778. In 1776, the bell was moved to the Johanniskirche in Bornheim as a makeshift in the year that the church burned down. By the 18th century the city fortifications had lost their defensive value and the townspeople began to use the publicly accessible walls as a recreation area. Around 1705, the first lime trees were planted on the ramparts; beginning in 1765, a continuous avenue surrounded Frankfurt and Sachsenhausen.

During the Seven Years' War, the city was occupied by French troops, and its inhabitants were made to pay significant compulsory contributions.

== Demolition ==
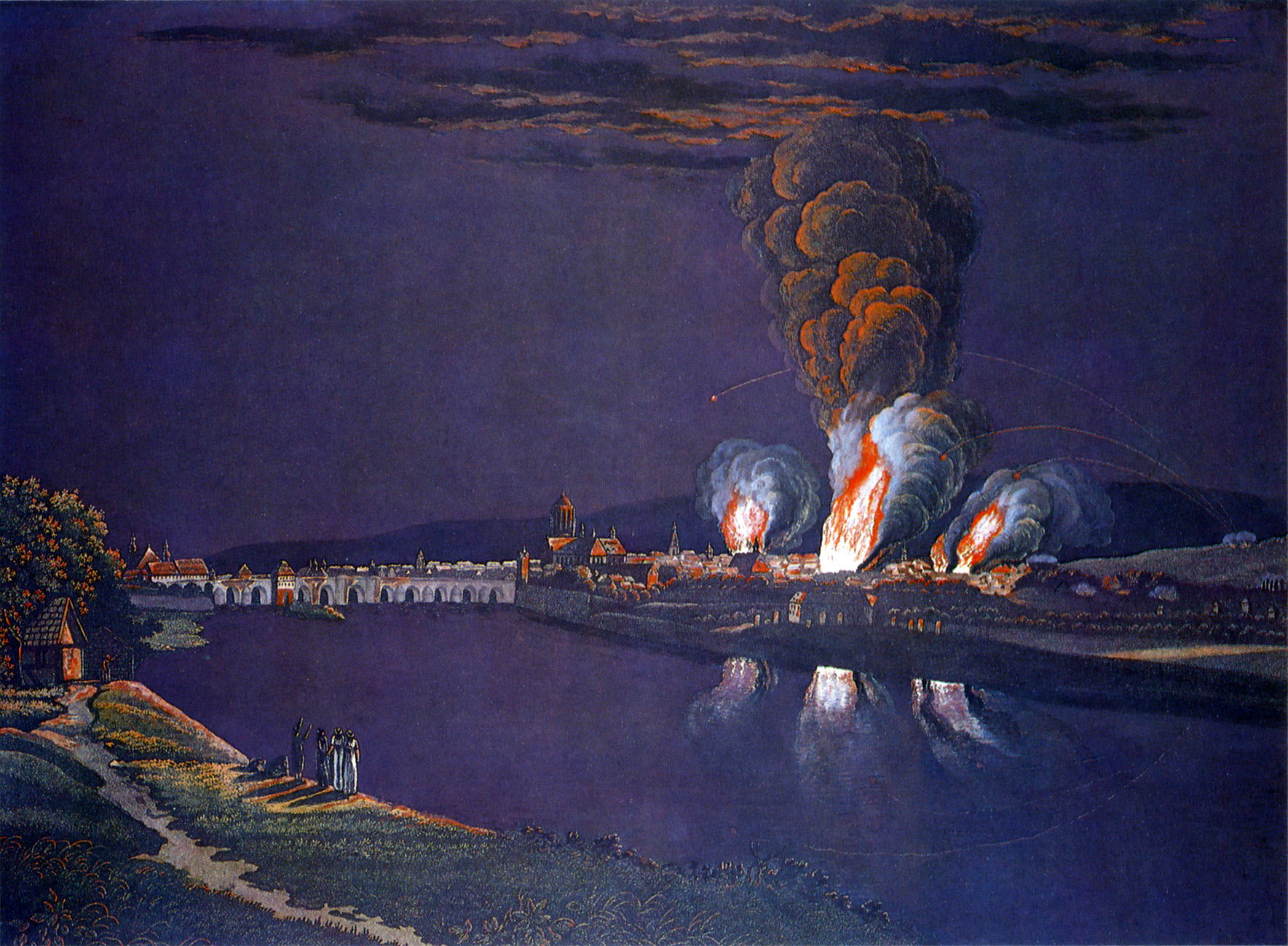
The bombardment of 13 July 1796

In October 1792, French troops occupied the city. While allied troops from Hesse and Prussia managed to expel the invaders on 2 December 1792, the expulsion itself clearly proved the fortifications to be useless: The allied soldiers easily managed to take the Friedberger Tor by storm. In 1795 and 1796, hostile troops again arrived in front of the city. On 13 and 14 July 1796 French aggressors bombarded the city, inflicting severe damage, a third of the Frankfurter Judengasse, which had burned down in a large fire in 1721, was destroyed again. The French government suggested that the city could destroy its fortifications to prevent being used as an arms depot and military base, and so becoming a target for attack. Subsequently, the senate ordered the creation of plans for the slighting of the fortifications. As with the construction of the fortifications, planning for their demolition was a protracted process. Many of the plans only provided for the demolition of the bulwarks, deliberately preserving the 14th century's city wall as a protection against criminals and as a border control for people and goods. The high cost estimates caused the politicians to refuse a comprehensive plan. In 1804, after almost 20 months of discussion, the demolition was halfheartedly begun by 50 to 60 day labourers. An expert report in mid-1805 stated that, if it continued at the same speed, the deconstruction was expected to take at least nine more years.

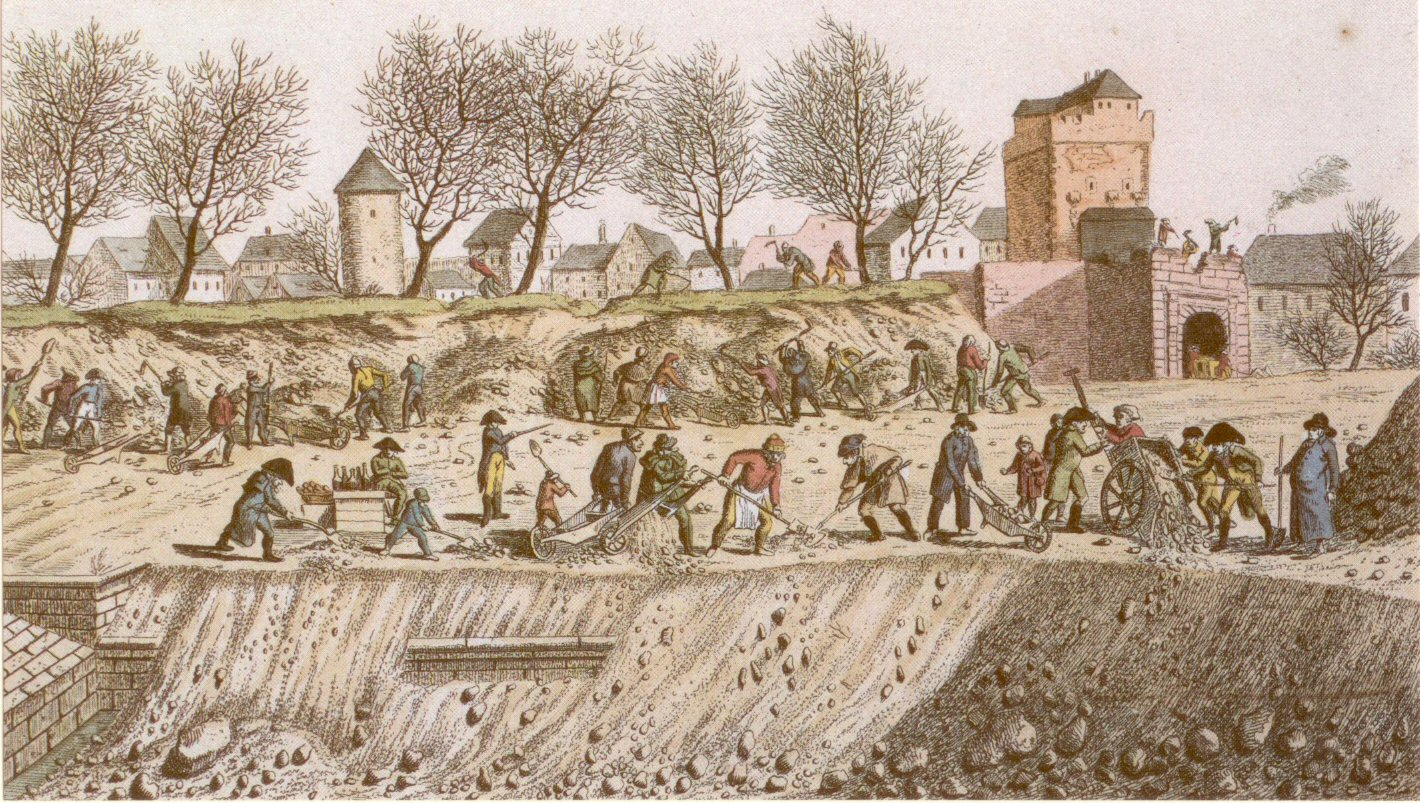
Destruction of the city fortification in 1806

Only in January 1806, when French soldiers occupied the city again, did the project gain new traction. At the same time, the senate asked the population to help with the demolition, resulting in unexpectedly high participation – probably due to the imminent danger of the Austrian-French war. With the end of the Holy Roman Empire in August 1806, the free imperial city of Frankfurt lost its independence and became part of the territory of Karl von Dalberg, prince primate. On behalf of Dalberg, Jakob Guiollett formulated a memorandum "Notice Regarding the Slighting of Local Fortifications" which was released on 5 November 1806. It recommended the demolition of Frankfurt's fortifications as well as the construction of a promenade and an English landscape garden, today's Wallanlagen, in place of the bulwarks. On 5 January 1807, the prince primate appointed Guiollett as the "princely commissioner of the fortification demolition".

Guiollett enlisted castle gardener Sebastian Rinz from Aschaffenburg to plan the work. In subsequent years the Bockenheimer Anlage (1806), the Eschenheimer Anlage (1807), the Friedberger Anlage (1808/1809) as well as the Taunus and Gallusanlage (1810) were constructed. Demolishing the mighty Mainzer Bollwerk (bulwark of Mainz) took from 1809 to 1818. In 1811 the Untermainanlage and the Neue Mainzer Straße were built on the site. In 1812 Rinz completed the work with the Obermainanlage. All parts of the fortification except the Sachsenhäuser Kuhhirtenturm and the Eschenheimer Turm were demolished; only a few gates from the 15th century at the Main river bank, including the Fahrtor, remained in place. They were demolished in 1840, when the Main river bank was raised by two metres.

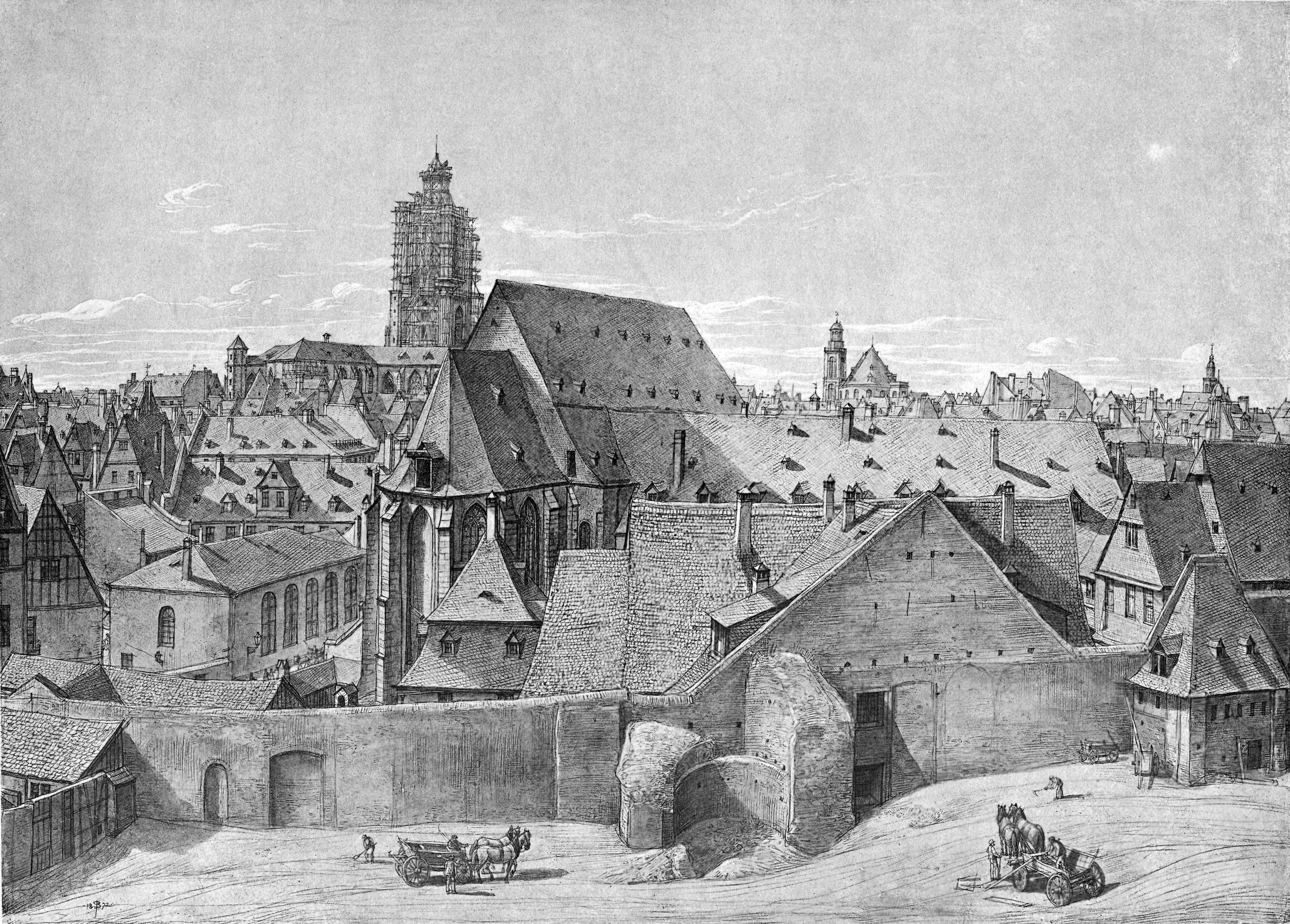
Remaining wall part of the Staufenmauer, with stump of the Mönchsturm (monk tower) at the Judengasse, 1872

The citizens considered the demolition of the old walls to be the sign of a historical turning point. Catharina Elisabeth Goethe delightedly wrote to her son Johann Wolfgang von Goethe on 1 July 1808 "The old walls have been deconstructed, the old gates have been taken down, the entire city is surrounded by a park, one would think it were Feerrey. The old wigs would not have been able to do this until judgement day." Rather wistfully, the younger Bettina von Arnim, already influenced by Romanticism, expressed herself: "Quite a few children of Frankfurt's citizens will have experienced the same as me, that to them, this is cold and eery, as if someone had sheared their wool in the middle of the winter." In 1813, French troops ravaged the newly-constructed ramparts on their retreat from their defeat at the Battle of Leipzig. Guiollett, meanwhile appointed as prefect of Grand Duchy of Frankfurt and Mayor of Frankfurt, immediately ordered them to be repaired by city gardener Rinz. When the Free City of Frankfurt regained its independence in 1816, it protected the new green belt against the construction of buildings by law.

Between 1807 and 1812 city master builder Johann Hess constructed classical-style gate buildings with wrought-iron latticework in place of the demolished gates; they were closed each evening until 1864. The early-baroque front gates of the Galgentor and the Eschenheimer Tor, as can be seen on contemporary images, were incorporated into the new buildings, but had been demolished by the end of the 19th century. The old armoury was deconstructed in 1886.

=== Surviving remnants ===
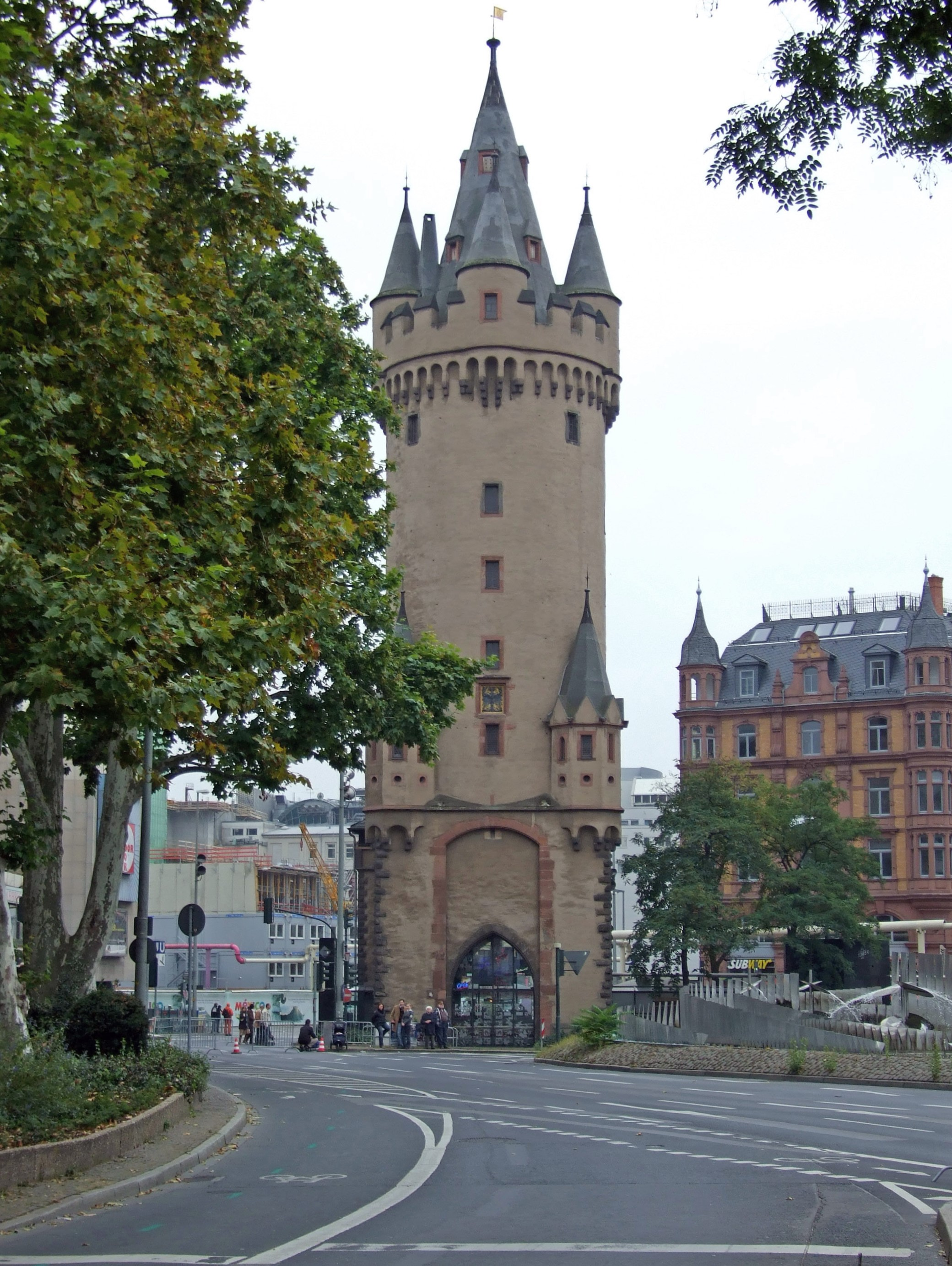
Eschenheimer Turm, seen from the north

The ramparts remained largely untouched due to their legal protection, and they still characterise the townscape of Frankfurt. Eight of the eleven historical bulwarks are still visible along the Anlagenring road; only the first demolished Galgenbollwerk and the two half bastions Fischerfeldbollwerk and Mainzer Bollwerk that had been located directly on the Main river bank have disappeared completely. The Rechneigrabenweiher in the Obermainanlage (Upper Main site), the pond in the Bockenheimer Anlage and the earthen mound of the former Junghofbollwerks in the Taunusanlage are still visible. On the mound, an equestrian statue of German emperor, William I, by Clemens Buscher, was located from 1896 to 1941. Since 1948, the Beethoven-Denkmal, Georg Kolbe's final work, has been on display here.

Remnants of the Main wall became a part of the quay wall between Obermainbrücke and Alte Brücke; the reused parts can be identified by their embrasures. For the construction of the high quay (Hochkai) below the Untermainbrücke, parts of the old Mainzer Bollwerk were reused. Only the Kuhhirtenturm (cowherds' tower) remains of the historical fortress ring of Sachsenhausen. On the other side of the Main, the only remaining towers of the fortifications are the landward Eschenheimer Turm, and the Rententurm at the Fahrtor on the Main. Of the classical gate buildings of the early nineteenth century only two Affentorhäuser in Sachsenhausen survive.

A 75-metre-long (246 ft) section of the Staufenmauer (Staufen wall) with 15 blind arches remains. It was part of a segment that had been renovated after the Grosser Christenbrand of 1719. Only after the destruction of the Altstadt in 1944 was the wall exposed. The houses between the Fronhofstrasse and the Wollgraben, and between the Fahrgasse and Hinter der schönen Aussicht, still show the 700-year-old position of the wall in their layout despite most of them having been rebuilt in classical style. Another remnant of the fortification is visible at the Liebfrauenberg in the west facade of the Liebfrauen church. No traces remain of the north Main landwehr. Of the Sachsenhäuser landwehr, moats and walls still exist between Wendelsweg and Viehweg. The four landwehr towers remain part of the townscape, having been used as vent shafts for Frankfurt's canalisation since the 1880s. Two of them, the Friedberger Warte and the Sachsenhäuser Warte, contain restaurants that are open to the public. Today, the Gothic gate building at the Hanauer Landstrasse denotes the eastern extent of the historical landwehr.

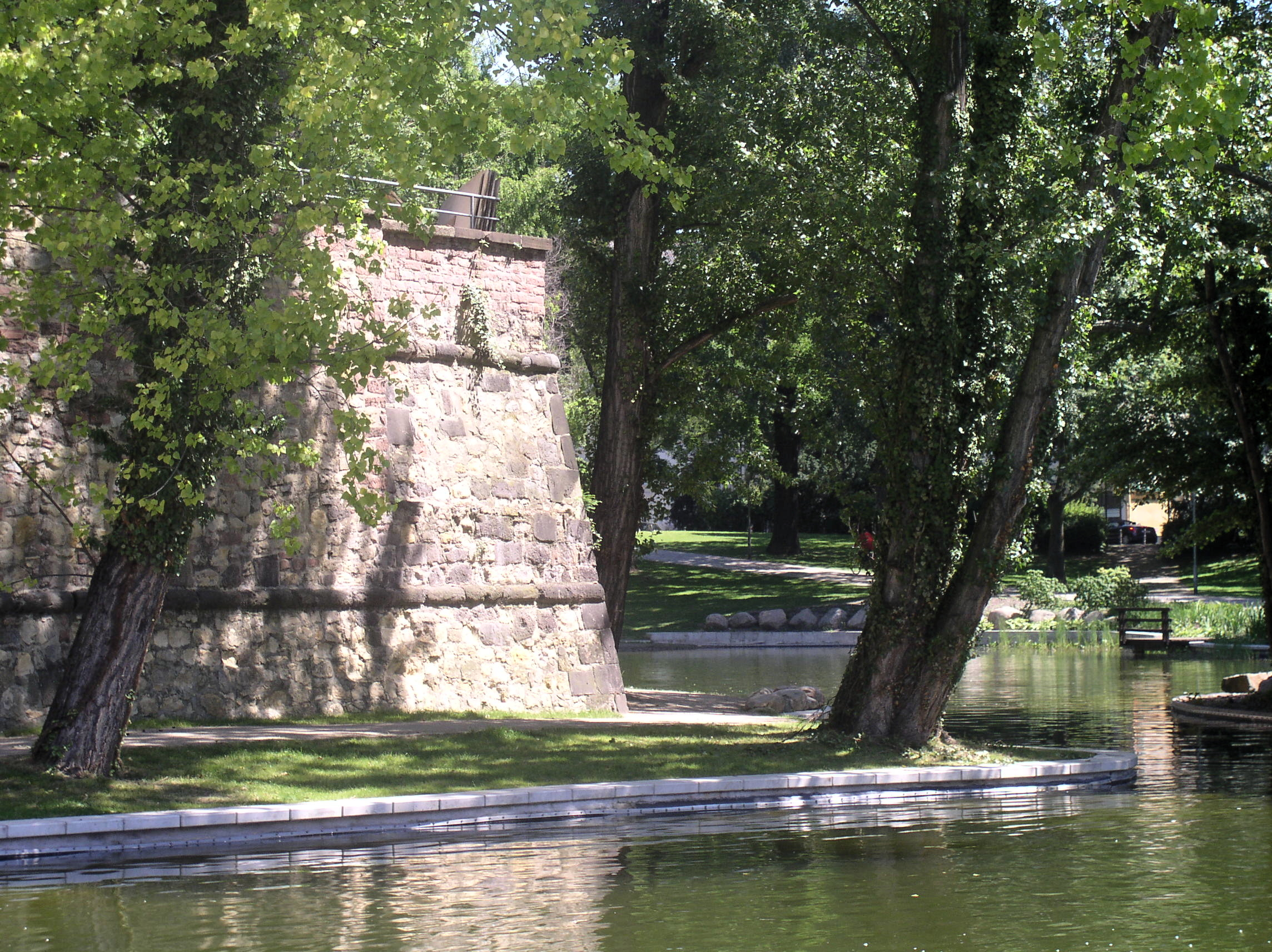
Wall remnants of the Allerheiligenbollwerk (all hallows' bulwark) at the Rechneigrabenweiher, a remnant of the water moat that once surrounded the city

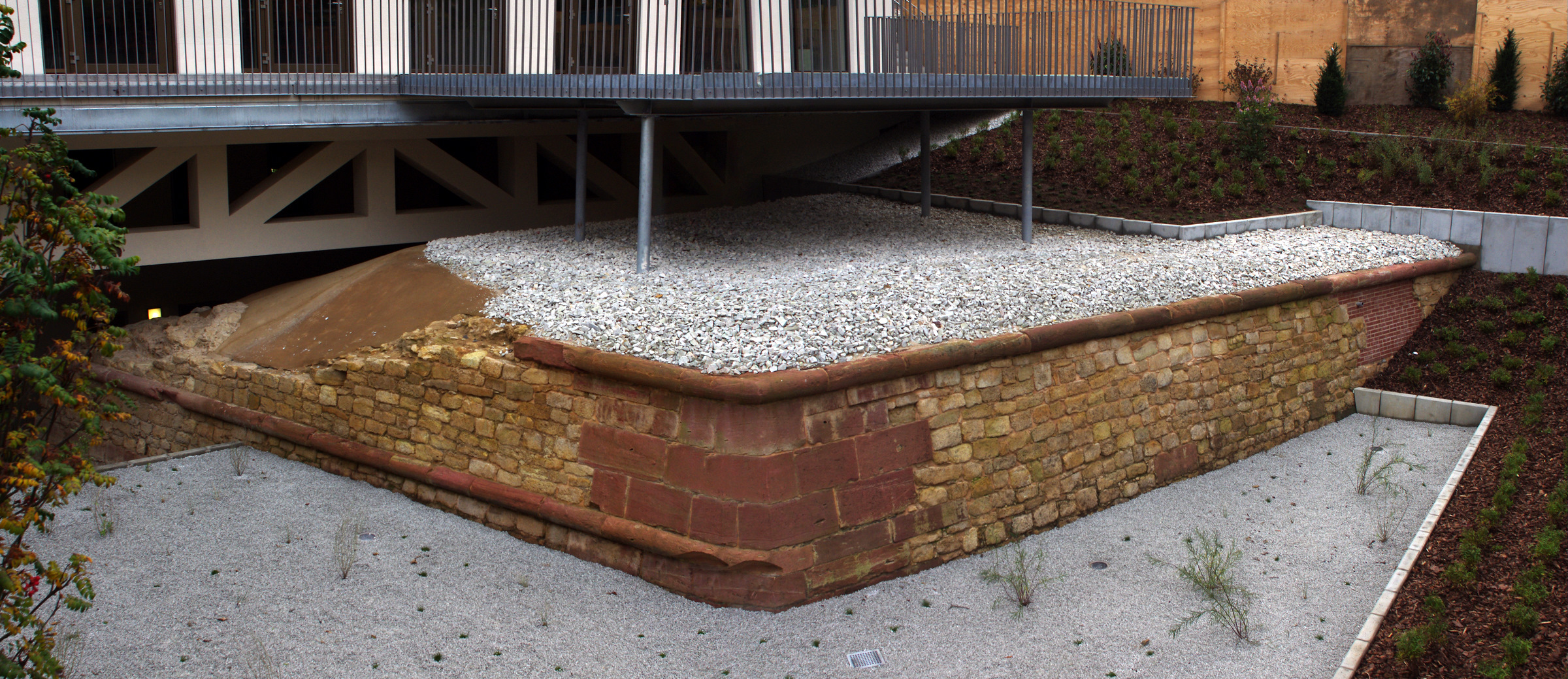
Wall remnants of the Friedberger Tor's (gate of Friedberg's) bastion, unearthed in 2009

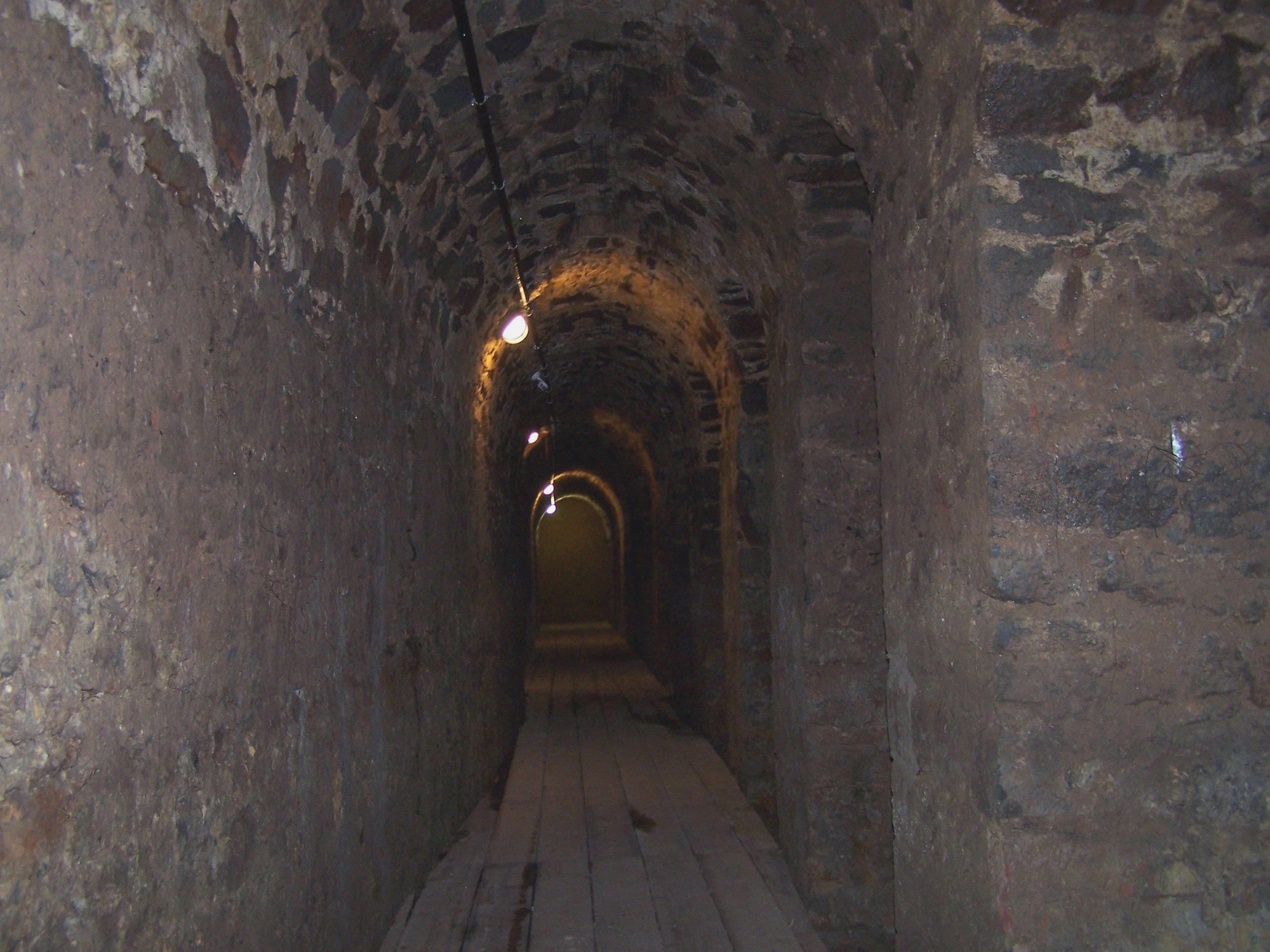
Casemates below the Friedberger Bastion (bastion of Friedberg), Bleichstrasse

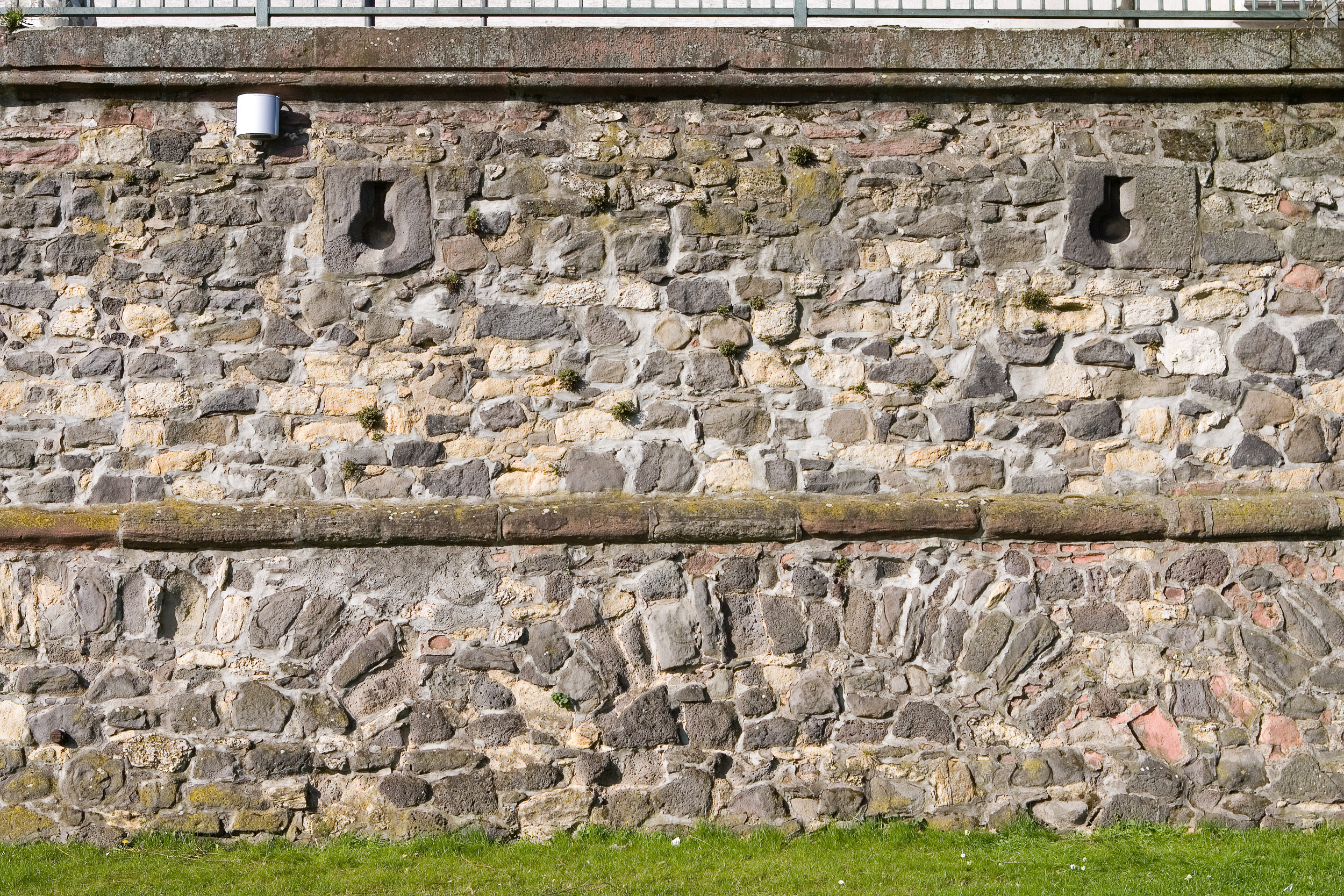
Embrasures in the Main wall

== See also ==
- History of Frankfurt am Main

== Literature ==
- Architekten- & Ingenieur-Verein (Hrsg.Architekten- & Ingenieur-Verein, ed. (1886), Frankfurt am Main und seine Bauten (in German), Frankfurt am Main: Selbstverlag des Vereins Digitalisat at the Internet Archive
- Friedrich Bothe: Geschichte der Stadt Frankfurt am Main. Verlag Wolfgang Weidlich, Frankfurt am Main 1977. ISBN 3-8035-8920-7.
- Elmar Brohl: Festungen in Hessen. Herausgegeben von der Deutschen Gesellschaft für Festungsforschung e.V., Wesel, Schnell und Steiner, Regensburg 2013 (= Deutsche Festungen 2), ISBN 978-3-7954-2534-0, S. 73–76.
- August von Cohausen: Beiträge zur Geschichte der Befestigung Frankfurts im Mittelalter. In: Archiv für Frankfurts Geschichte und Kunst. Band 12, Selbstverlag des Vereines für Geschichte und Alterthumskunde, Frankfurt am Main 1869.
- Walter Gerteis: Das unbekannte Frankfurt. 8. Auflage. Verlag Frankfurter Bücher, Frankfurt am Main 1991, ISBN 3-920346-05-X.
- Rudolf Jung: Die Niederlegung der Festungswerke in Frankfurt am Main 1802–1807. In: Archiv für Frankfurts Geschichte und Kunst. Band 30, Selbstverlag des Vereines für Geschichte und Alterthumskunde, Frankfurt am Main 1913.
- Fried Lübbecke: Das Antlitz der Stadt. Nach Frankfurts Plänen von Faber, Merian und Delkeskamp. 1552–1864. Verlag Waldemar Kramer, Frankfurt am Main 1952.
- Ernst Mack: Von der Steinzeit zur Stauferstadt. Die frühe Geschichte von Frankfurt am Main. Knecht, Frankfurt am Main 1994. ISBN 3-7820-0685-2.
- Emil Padjera: Die bastionäre Befestigung von Frankfurt a. M. In: Archiv für Frankfurts Geschichte und Kunst. Band 31, Selbstverlag des Vereines für Geschichte und Alterthumskunde, Frankfurt am Main 1920.
- Eduard Pelissier: Die Landwehren der Reichsstadt Frankfurt am Main. Topographisch-historische Untersuchung. Völcker, Frankfurt am Main 1905.
- Martin Romeiss: Die Wehrverfassung der Stadt Frankfurt am Main im Mittelalter. In: Archiv für Frankfurts Geschichte und Kunst. Band 41, Verlag Waldemar Kramer, Frankfurt am Main 1953.
- Heinrich Schüßler: Frankfurts Türme und Tore. Verlag Waldemar Kramer, Frankfurt am Main 1951.
- Christian Ludwig Thomas: Die erste Stadtmauer von Frankfurt a. Main. In: Bericht über die Fortschritte der römisch-germanischen Forschung. Band 1, Verlag von Joseph Baer, Frankfurt am Main 1904.
- Christian Ludwig Thomas: Der nordwestliche Zug der ersten Stadtmauer von Frankfurt a. M. In: Einzelforschungen über Kunst- u. Altertumsgegenstände zu Frankfurt am Main. Band 1 (mehr nicht erschienen), Verlag von Joseph Baer, Frankfurt am Main 1908.
- Magnus Wintergerst: Franconofurd. Band I. Die Befunde der karolingisch-ottonischen Pfalz aus den Frankfurter Altstadtgrabungen 1953–1993. Archäologisches Museum Frankfurt, Frankfurt am Main 2007, ISBN 3-88270-501-9 (Schriften des Archäologischen Museums Frankfurt 22/1).
- Carl Wolff; Rudolf Jung (1898). Die Baudenkmäler in Frankfurt am Main Zweiter Band. Weltliche Bauten (PDF). Frankfurt am Main: Völcker.
