= Staufenmauer =

Coordinates: 50°06′49″N 8°41′13″E

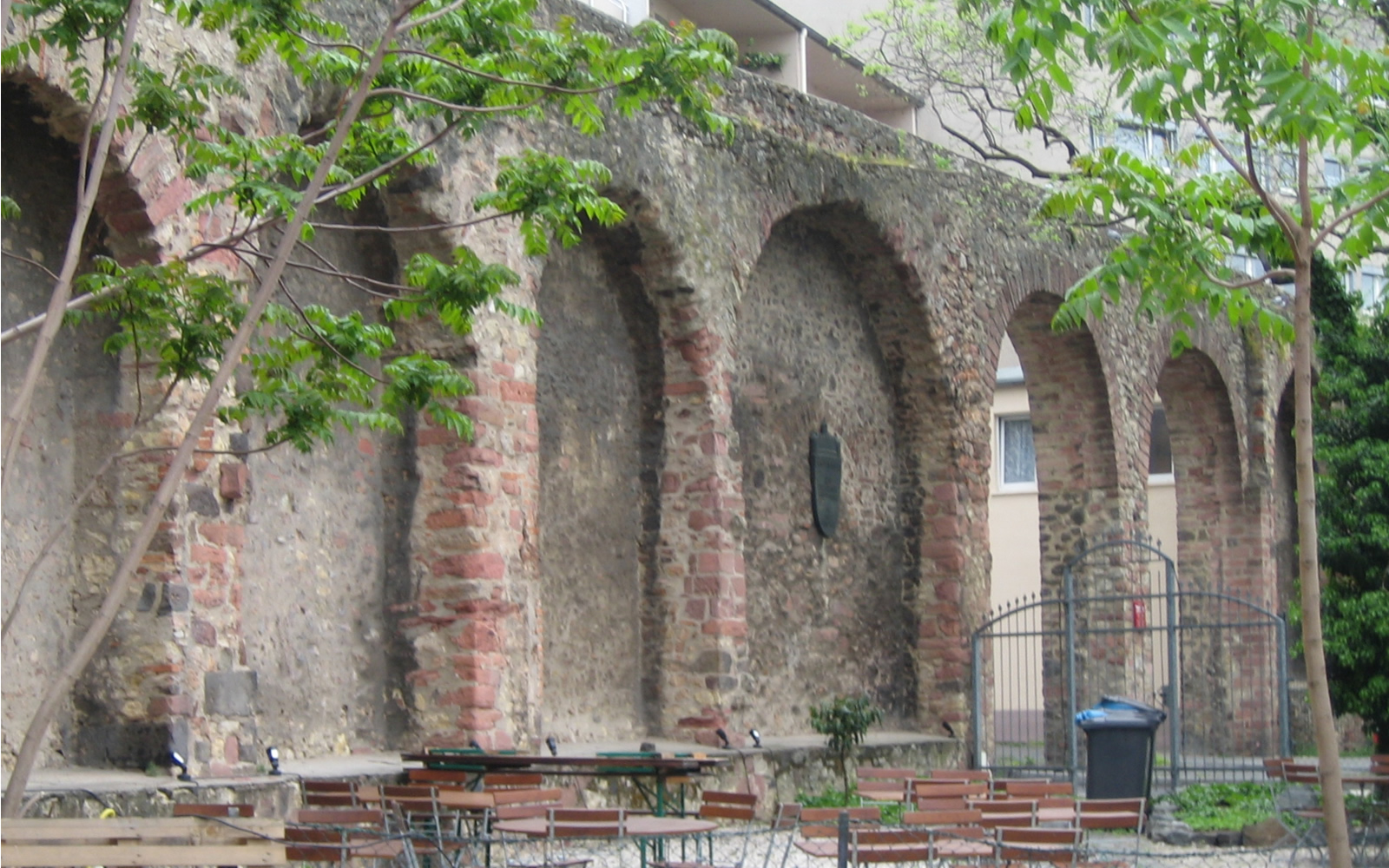
Part of Staufenmauer at Fahrgasse

The Staufenmauer was an old city wall of Frankfurt am Main, Germany.

As part of the fortification of Frankfurt, it was built in 1180 under the Hohenstaufen rule to protect the city from attack and surround the present Altstadt. When the city was expanded in 1333, the old wall became a victim of efforts to reorganize the city defenses.

Today one can still see a small portion along the Fahrgasse, a part that was restored after the last 18th century fire in 1796 in the Jewish Ghetto.
