= Freiburg Altarpiece =

Altarpiece by Hans Baldung

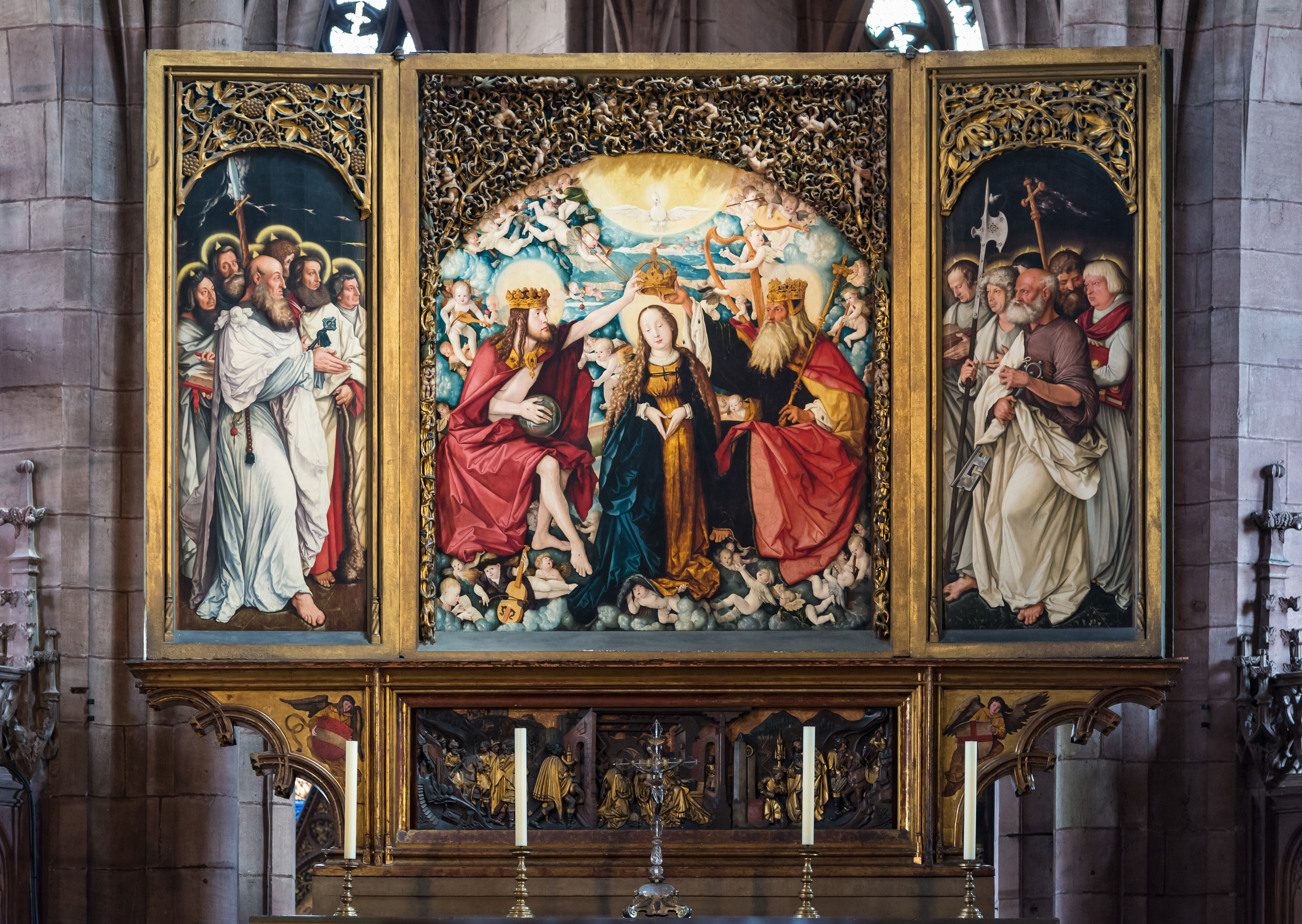
- Artist: Hans Baldung Grien
- Year: 1516
- Medium: oil on wood panel
- Location: Freiburg Minster, Freiburg im Breisgau

The Freiburg Altarpiece is an oil on wood panel altarpiece, created for the high altar of Frieburg Minster by the German Renaissance painter and printmaker, Hans Baldung Grien. The altarpiece is a polyptych with eleven panels created by Baldung and members of his studio. Baldung lived in Freiburg from 1512 to 1517 as he worked on the altarpiece. The painting is notable because it contains a self-portrait of the artist, as well as Baldung's monogram and signature.

== Influences and creation ==
=== Commission ===
The Freiburg altarpiece was crucial in boosting Baldung's career and gave him considerable financial success. He received a payment of 340 Rhenish florins, with an additional 250 florins to be paid over time. From this sum, he earned around eighteen to twenty florins each year. The predella on the back of the altarpiece includes a portrait of the four patrons: Aegidius Haas, Sebastian von Blumenegg, Ulrich Wirtner, and Nikolaus Scheffer. His brother, Casper Baldung, may have helped him gain the commission, since he was teaching in Freiburg at the time. However, Baldung had reached a considerable degree of acclaim already, so it is also possible he gained the commission on his own merit.

=== Albrecht Dürer ===
Hans Baldung was a student of the painter Albrecht Dürer, and Baldung was inspired by his artistic style throughout his career. The theme of the coronation is borrowed from the center panel of Dürer's Heller Altarpiece, which was lost in a fire in 1729. It also contains elements from Dürer's Coronation of the Virgin woodcut.

=== Matthias Grünewald ===
The Annunciation scene takes inspiration from Matthias Grünewald's adaptation, which is a part of his Isenheim Altarpiece. Baldung's depiction of the angel Gabriel is particularly influenced by this piece. The emphasized emotionality of Baldung's "Head of a Fool" character on the back panel can also be compared to drawings by Grünewald.

== Interior panels ==
When opened, the altarpiece displays the Coronation of the Virgin. She sits on a throne with Christ to the left of her. He extends a crown above her head. God the Father is seated on the right. A chorus of angels swarm around the scene. To the left of the Virgin, Christ is depicted draped in a red cloak. The way the cloak is positioned over his body may have been to show the wounds on his hands, feet, and breast. God the Father is depicted with unkempt hair and tanned skin. His appearance suggests he has spent quite a bit of time outside. The angels, which are numerous and populate the entire background of the painting, have distinctive flaws – some have distorted arms and legs, or their eyes are not entirely in focus.

On the wings, the Twelve Apostles are shown. On the left, St. Paul is in front. The work has been speculated by art historians to be the work of an assistant, due to its rougher appearance compared to the right panel. St. Peter is the central figure of the right pane, holding a large key. He wears a workman's jacket and appears to have a tan. These elements make him more earthly rather than divine, humanizing him.

== Exterior panels ==
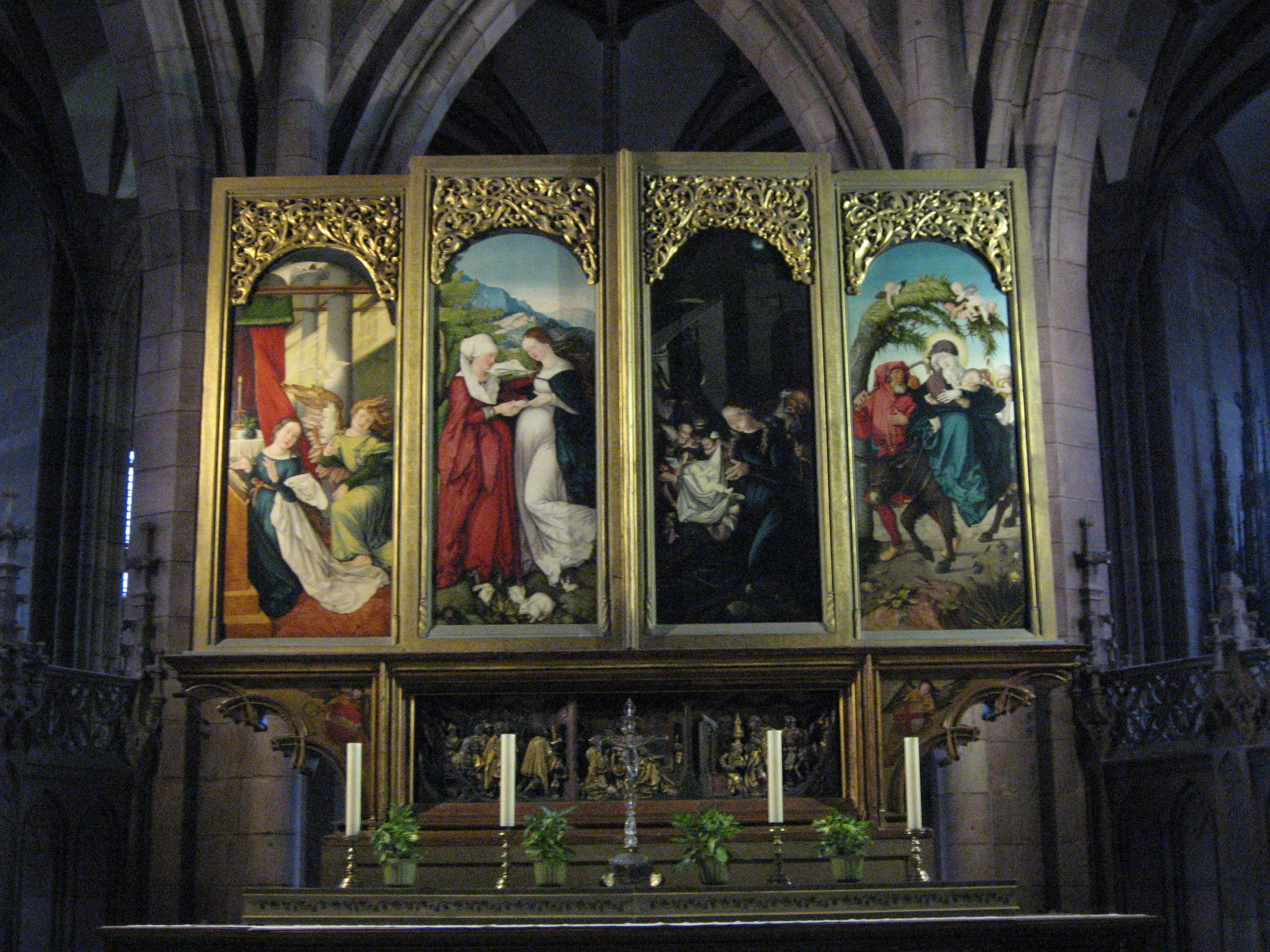
Hans Baldung Grien, Freiburg Altarpiece (closed), 1516

When closed, the altarpiece shows four scenes from the life of the Virgin Mary: the Annunciation, the Visitation, the Birth of Christ, and the Flight into Egypt. The panels depict scenes from the Virgin Mary's life because the church itself was dedicated to her. These scenes would be shown for the Christmas season.

In the Annunciation, the burning candle is a representation of holy light. The vase containing the Lily of the Valley is symbolic of the Virgin Mary. The Holy Ghost is present in the scene in the form of a dove. Cracks have begun to form in the floor and the walls.

The Nativity scene in particular stands out due to its usage of light. The infant Christ is glowing, casting different shadows upon the people who observe him. The experiment was certainly unique for its time, although it has been critiqued for its usage of harsh lighting. In the background, the walls are deteriorating, indicating the start of a new age that has begun with the birth of Christ.

In the Visitation, the combination of colors and the serene expression on Mary's face makes it one of Baldung's most joyful paintings. Mary carries herself with an air of divine dignity, while still retaining her earthly relatability. White rabbits are at the feet of the two women, symbolizing fertility.

The Flight into Egypt leans into Joseph's superior age, showing him on unsteady legs and offering a contrast to the youth of the Virgin Mary. A few errors in Mary's presentation, especially the disproportionate nature of her arms and hands, has again implied the presence of an assistant.

== Back panels ==
The back panel shows the Crucifixion. Christ is shown nailed to a cross in the center of the image, with two other men hanging on crosses at either side of him. The man to Christ's right repents, and thus is passive in his state. The man to his left, however, struggles against his bonds, showing his refusal to repent. A crowd of people stand behind him and on the wings of the altar. The skull at the bottom of the cross signifies that the event is taking place at Golgotha. This was the burial site for Adam, symbolizing how Christ has become the new Adam.

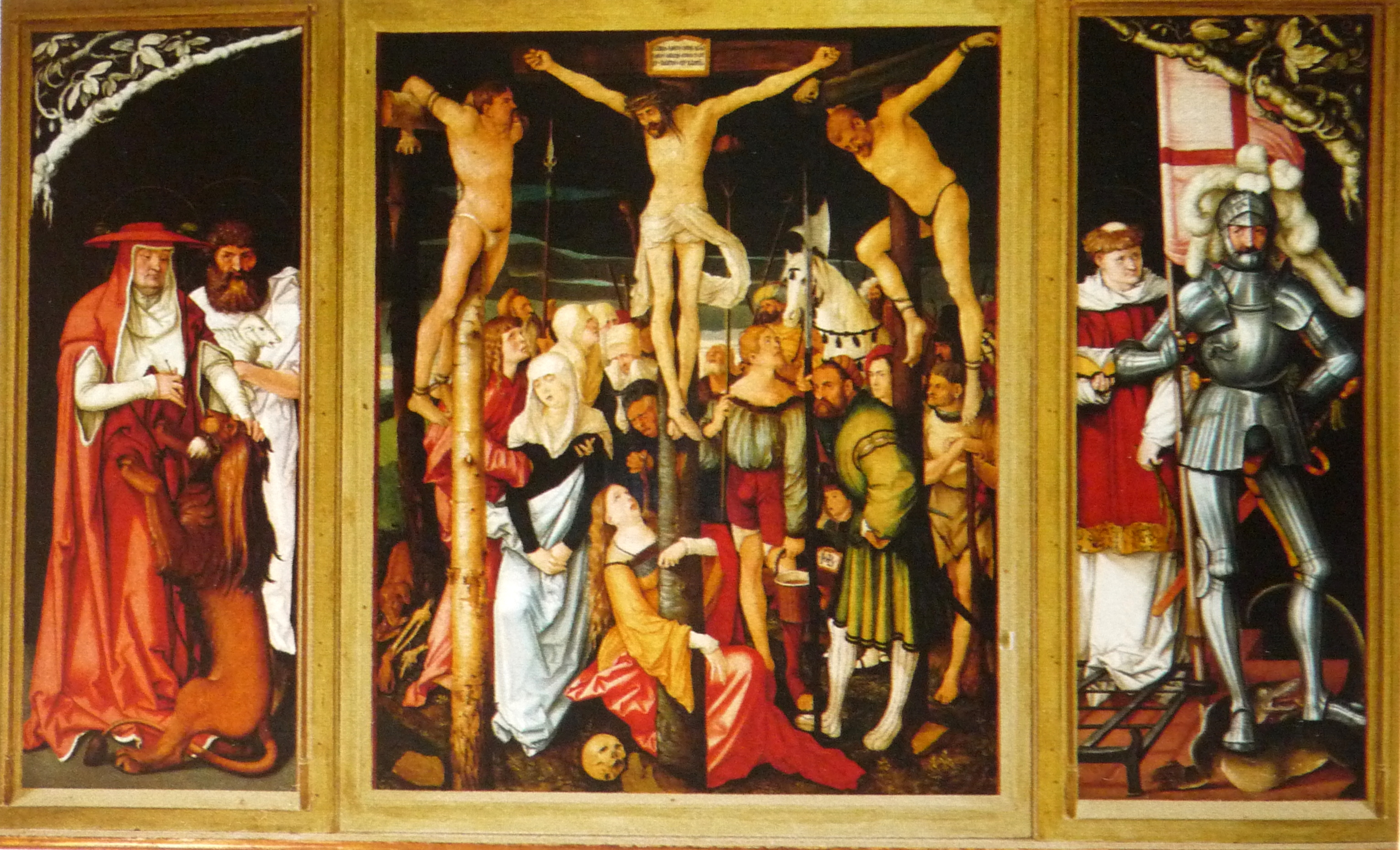
Freiburg Altarpiece (back)

=== Mary Magdalene ===
Mary Magdalene wraps her arms around the base of the cross, looking sorrowfully up at Christ. This was a common convention in paintings of the Crucifixion created at the beginning of the sixteenth century. While it was not created by the artist Giotto, his Crucifixion from the Scrovegni Chapel (c. 1304/1305) helped solidify Magdalene's position at the foot of the cross.

=== Head of a Fool ===
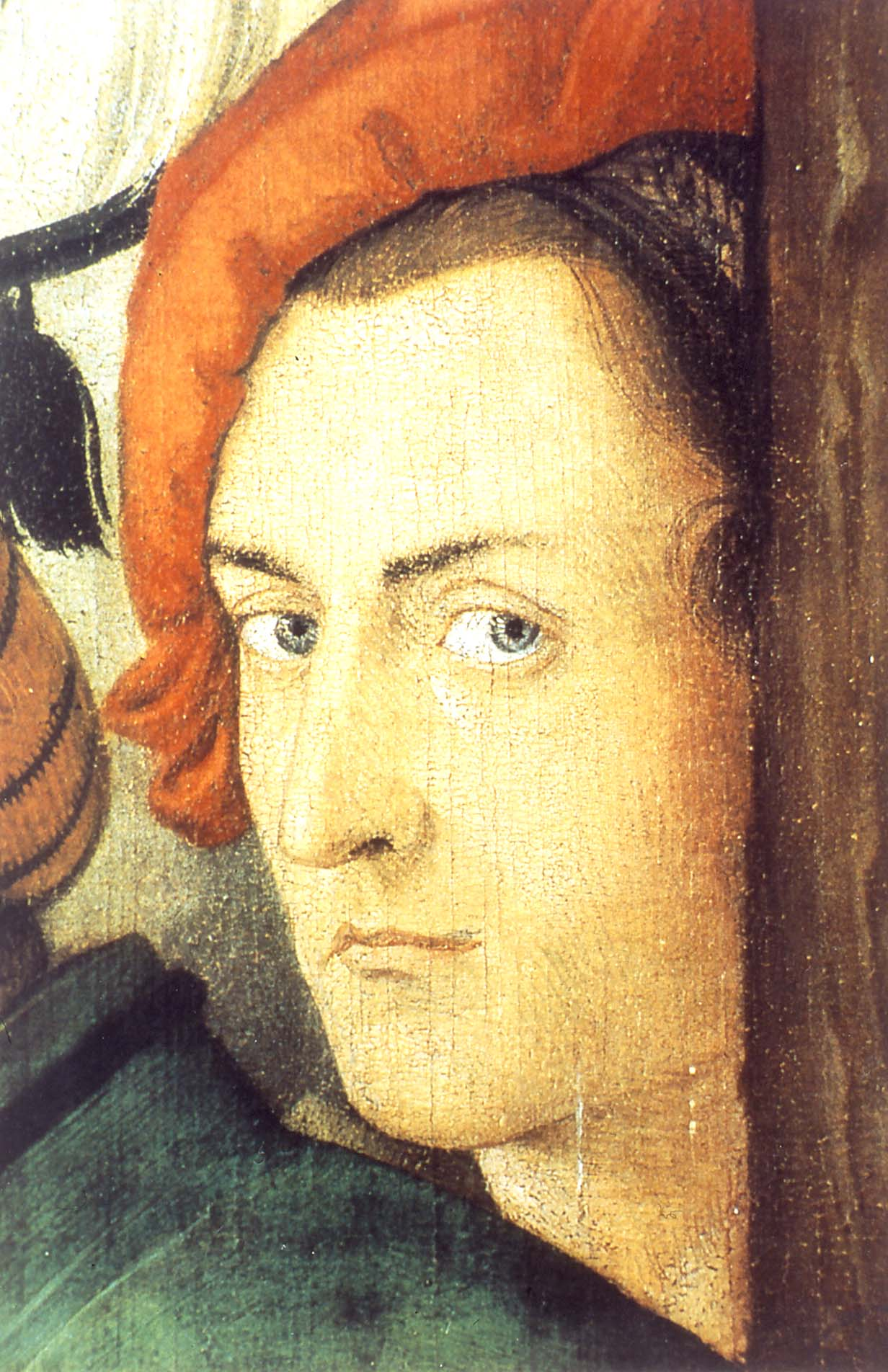
Hans Baldung, Self-portrait (1516), detail from the High altar of Freiburg Minster

Peeking out from behind the central cross is an image of a man with his mouth open, staring blankly forward. The exaggerated expression of the figure intends to display the cruel, grotesque nature of those responsible for the events of the Crucifixion. This depiction of Christ's persecutors is common in Northern art from the fifteenth and sixteenth centuries.

=== Self-portrait ===
Standing behind the cross on the right is a man in a red beret. This has been identified as a self portrait of Hans Baldung himself. His hand is placed on a young man's shoulder, whose chest displays Baldung's monogram.

== Reception ==
While the Freiburg Altarpiece is often considered Baldung's masterpiece, his close association with the styles of his contemporaries drew criticism. He often drew inspiration from Dürer, but was sometimes criticized for lacking his own style. However, the ways in which Baldung worked with the material already produced by Dürer could be his way of expanding on Dürer's artistic choices. Early twentieth-century scholars (including Curjel, Hugelshofer, and Pinder) found his work too eccentric or not serious enough for the subjects it showed. Fritz Baumgarten was particularly displeased with the lack of dignity, critiquing the angels for disrupting the "heavenly silence."
