= Stone House (Frankfurt am Main) =

Historic building in the Old Town of Frankfurt am Main

Coordinates: 50.1108°N 8.6828°E

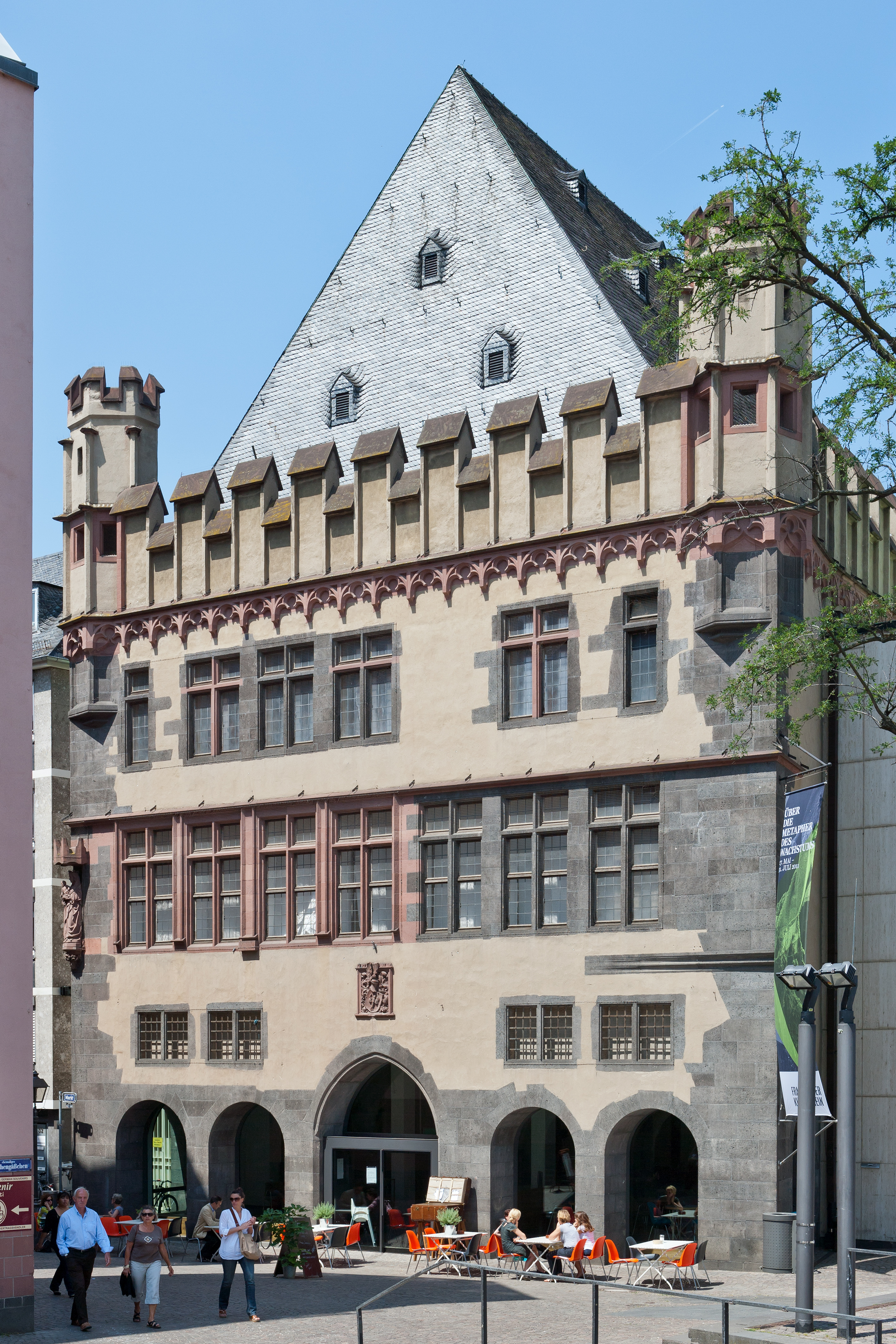
The Stone House, July 2011

The Stone House (German: Steinernes Haus), also known as Haus Bornfleck in older literature, is a historic building in the old town of Frankfurt am Main. Its front faces the Markt, which connects the cathedral with the Römerberg. It stands out from other buildings in the old town, primarily due to its medieval architecture and its well-documented history.

During the Second World War, the Steinerne Haus was almost completely destroyed by explosive bombs during air raids on Frankfurt am Main in March 1944. Nevertheless, it was reconstructed in the early 1960s as one of only a few Frankfurt architectural monuments, at great expense and relatively true to the original, distinguishing it from the simpler post-war buildings surrounding it. Today, the house is home to the Frankfurter Kunstverein.

== History ==
=== History (Roman period to 1460) ===
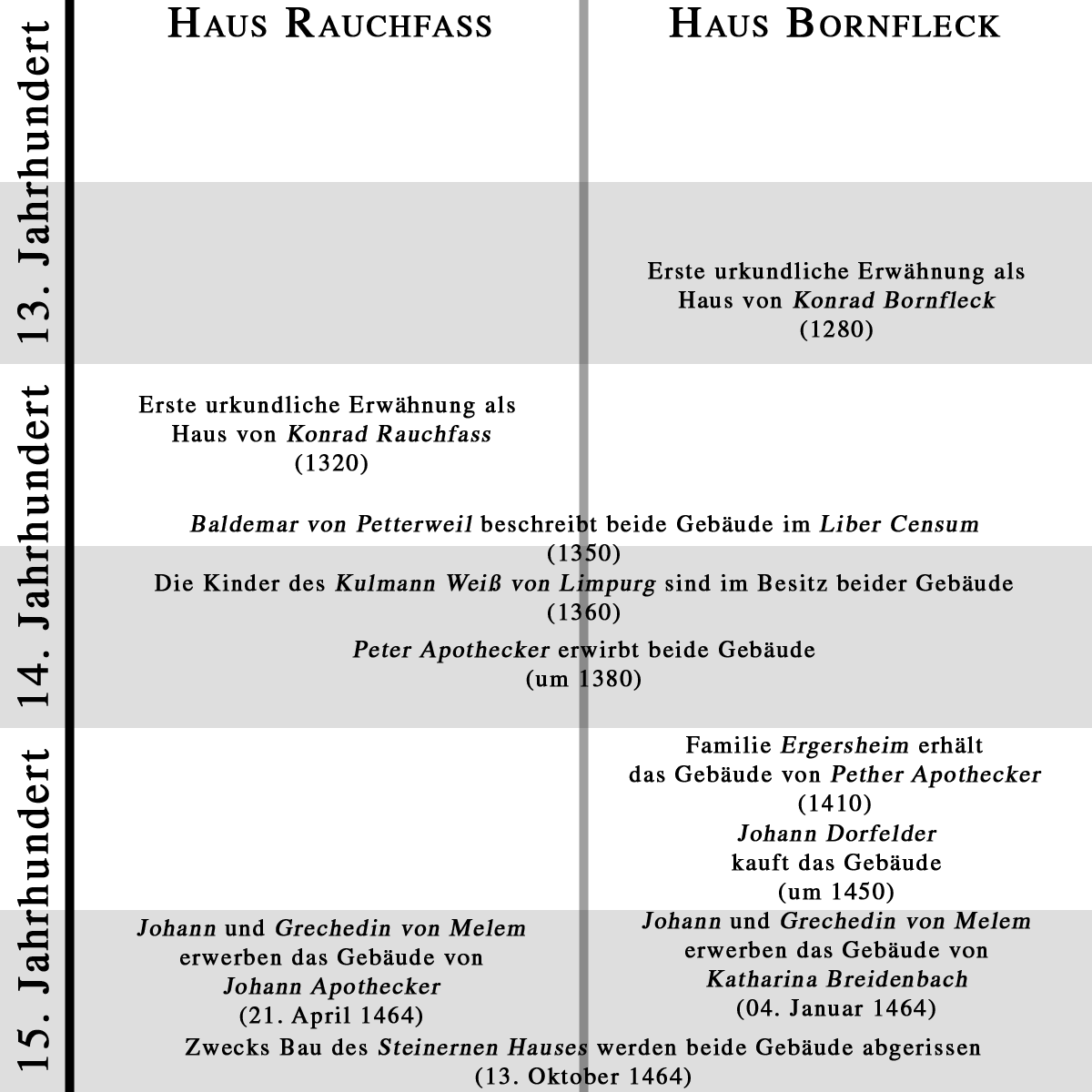
Development of the previous buildings, 1280–1464

Excavations in the old town in 1906 and the 1950s revealed that the site of the Stone House was already developed in Roman times. Beneath the massive cellars of the building, constructed about 1,000 years later, archaeologists found strong wall remains attributed to a former estate. Roof tiles and slate slabs from the same period were also discovered. At that time, a tributary of the Main River, the Braubach, flowed above ground north of the site, roughly along the course of the modern street of the same name. The area south of it was strategically and economically significant, protected by the river as a natural border and benefiting from proximity to water, an essential resource for settlers. The oldest written records documenting ownership of the Stone House and its predecessor buildings date to the late 13th century. Although most of these sources were lost during the Second World War, earlier researchers, particularly Johann Georg Battonn and Rudolf Jung, evaluated them to provide a detailed history of the house.

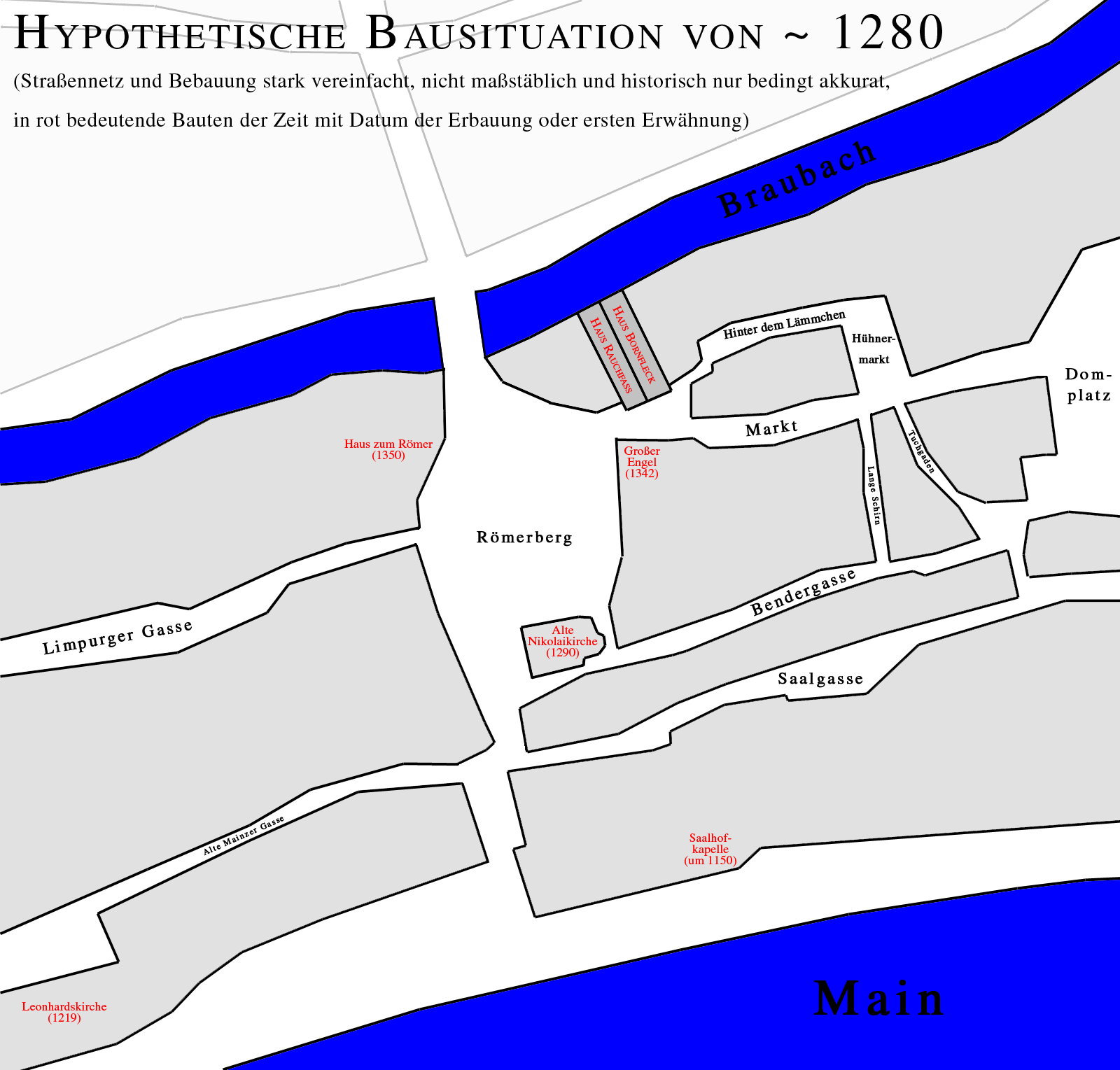
Hypothetical construction situation around 1280

In the second half of the 13th century, two narrow half-timbered houses stood on the site of what would later become the Stone House: the western Haus zum Rauchfaß and the eastern Haus Bornfleck. Both had their rear sides facing the Braubach, which served as the town moat, and their fronts facing the market square. The name Bornfleck suggests that a well (Born in Old German) once existed there. In 1280, Konrad Bornfleck was first documented as the owner of the house; he died by 1306. His mention as an assessor in a 1291 document indicates his prominence. The Archbishop of Mainz, Gerhard II, referred to him as his dear host in Frankfurt. His wife, Hedwig, was a daughter of Gypel von Holzhausen, one of Frankfurt’s prominent patrician families, suggesting Konrad moved in the city’s highest social circles.

When Frankfurt was confirmed as the place of election for German emperors by the Golden Bull of 1356, the market was nicknamed Krönungsweg (Coronation Way) or via regia, as newly elected emperors traveled along it to the Roman cathedral to be honored by the people and the city council. This greatly increased the street’s importance in subsequent centuries, making the plots along it a preferred residence and building site for the nobility and wealthy bourgeoisie.

In 1360, the children of Kulmann Weiß von Limpurg were documented as owning the Bornfleck house and the neighbouring Haus zum Rauchfaß. The latter was first mentioned in a 1320 document as the surname of its then-owner, Konrad, who likely sold it to the children of the Limpurg family in the 1450s. In 1362, they divided the property by erecting a wall extending to the city moat. The Bornfleck house passed to Alheid, widow of Gypel Knoblauch, while the Rauchfaß house went to the other children of Kulmann Weiß von Limpurg. In 1374, Alheid sold the Bornfleck house for 1,600 guilders, and shortly afterwards, the Rauchfaß house was sold to her son-in-law, Peter Apothecker. From his family, the Bornfleck house passed to the Ergersheim family in 1410.

=== Period of origin and the Melem dynasty (1460 to 1708) ===
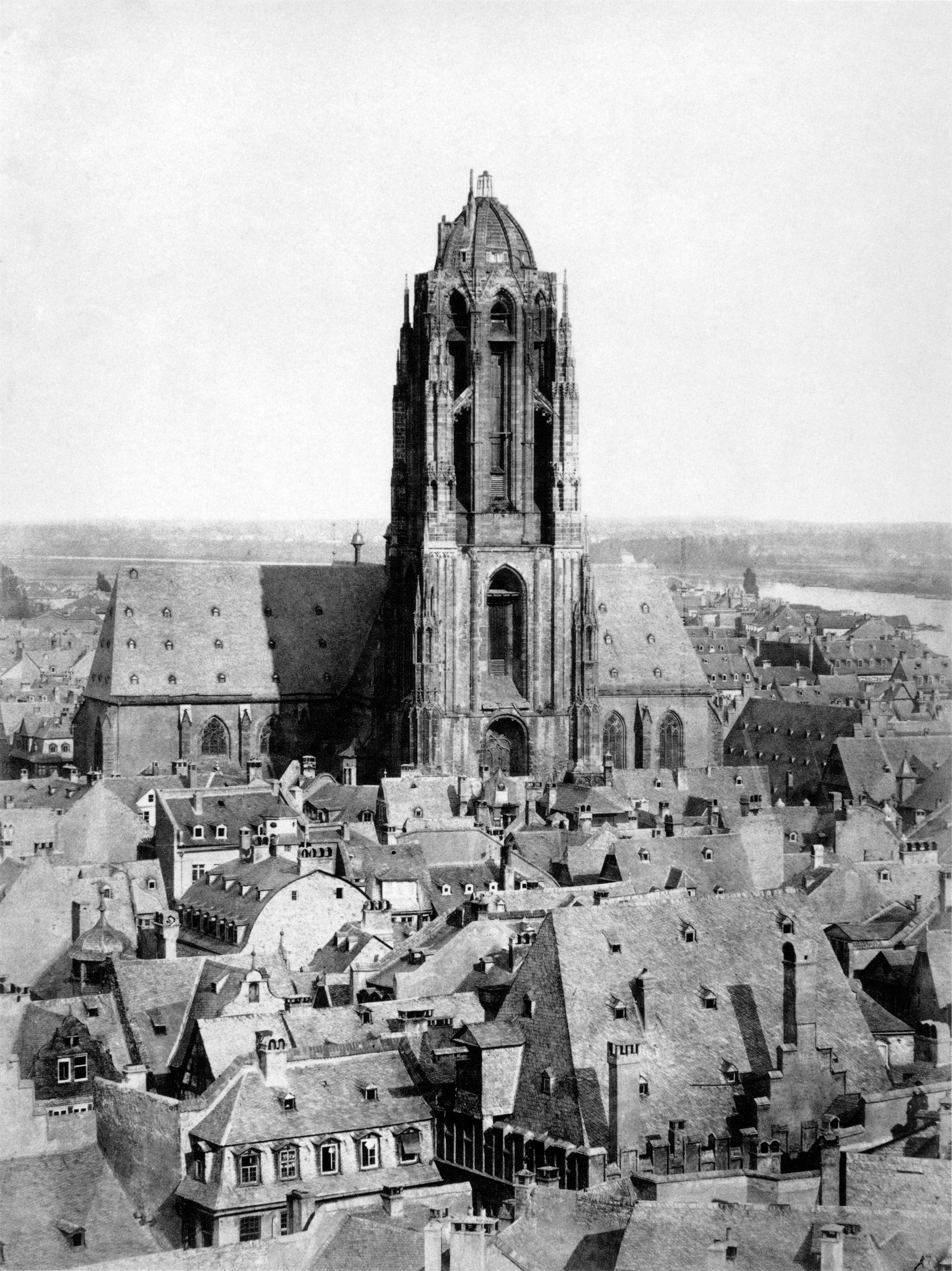
Roofscape of the old town with Stone House, 1866

In the mid-15th century, the wealthy cloth merchant Johann Dorfelder from Mainz, whose daughters were married to Klas von Rücklingen and Johann von Melem, acquired Haus Bornfleck. On 4 January 1462, Katharina, widow of Klas von Rücklingen and wife of Georg Breidenbach, sold the building to her brother-in-law and sister, Johann and Gredgen von Melem. On 21 April 1464, the new owners also acquired the Rauchfaß house from Johann Apothecker. With both buildings in their possession, the Melem couple demolished them in October 1464 to merge the plots into a new building. The Lersner Chronicle provides a detailed account of these events:

1464. On the Saturday before St. Galli Day [i.e., Saturday, 13 October], Johann von Melem built the house at Bornflecken on the Haber-Marckt; his son Johann von Melem [the Younger] laid the first stone and placed three Alturnes or Turonos on the stone for the workers to drink. This took place at the site opposite the smithies at 1 o’clock in the afternoon.

Although modern historians view Lersner’s chronicle critically, an entry in the church register of St. Nicolaus Chapel largely confirms this information:

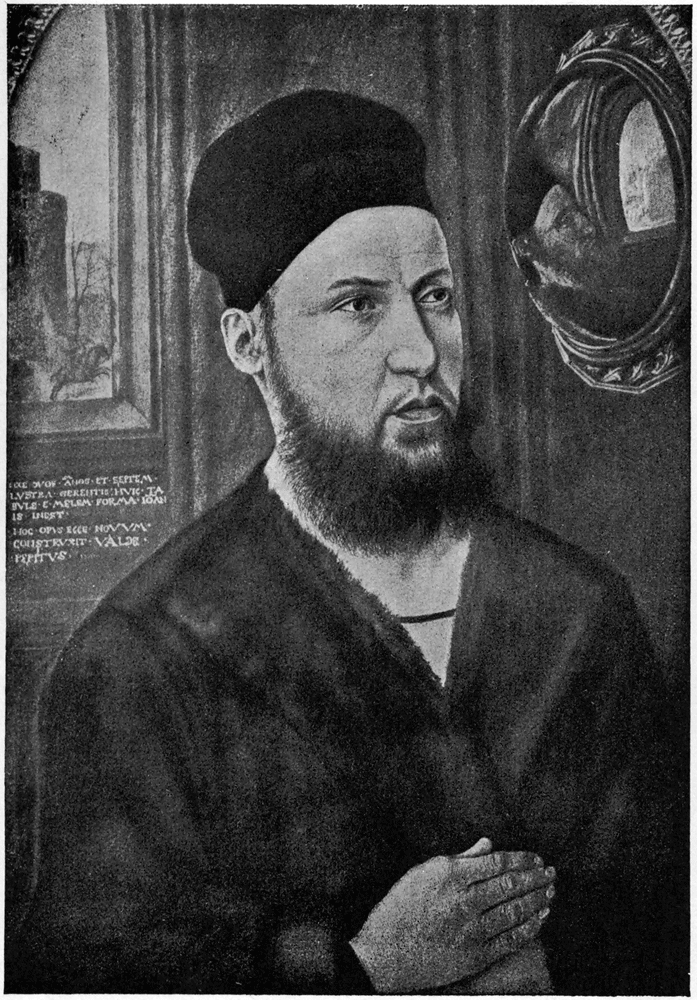
Johann von Melem the Younger, c. 1490

In the year 1464, the house known as Bornflecken was demolished and rebuilt with stone and mortar. The house was located under the kremen [note: Krämergasse, medieval name for the market] between the old Guldenschaffe and Kursener Louben.

The newly constructed building towered over the surrounding rooftops for nearly 500 years until the old town was destroyed in the Second World War in 1944. Adjacent to the Stone House, a courtyard complex of mainly two-story half-timbered houses was built to the north. It served as a residence for the domestic staff of the owners and as accommodation for guests attending the Frankfurt Trade Fair or coronation ceremonies. This complex, with significant buildings from the first half of the 15th century, remained intact until the early 20th century, when it was demolished for the construction of Braubachstraße. The builder, Johann von Melem, was originally from Cologne. After marrying the daughter of Johann Dorfelder in 1454, he gained Frankfurt citizenship in 1456. The Melemsche Handelsgesellschaft (Melem Trading Company) he founded became one of Frankfurt’s most important companies by the end of the Middle Ages, making Johann one of the city’s wealthiest citizens. The Lower Rhine influences from Melem’s Cologne origins are reflected in the architecture of his building, as discussed in the architectural section of this article.

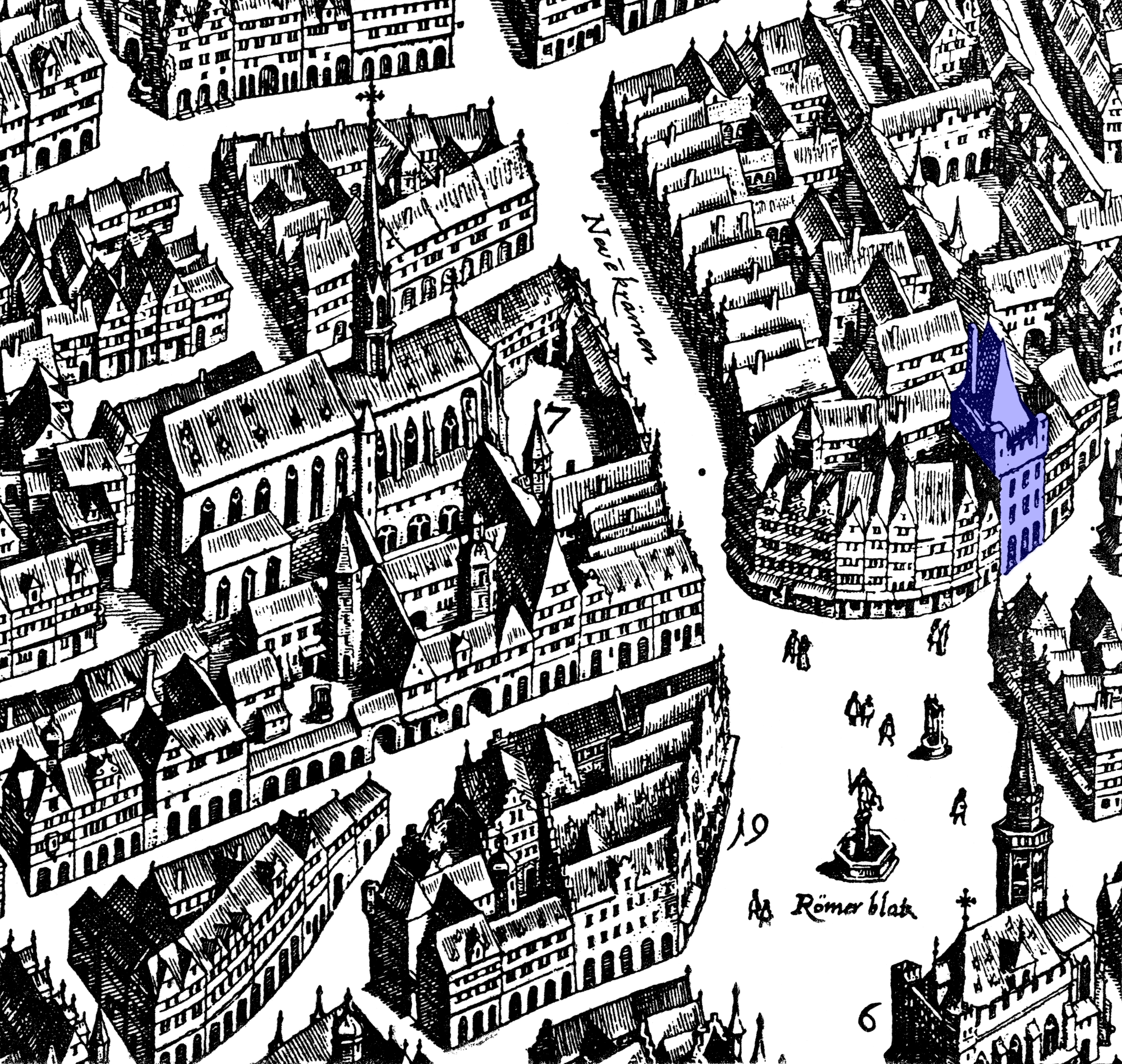
Stone House on Merian’s map, 1628

After Johann’s death on 20 March 1484, his son, Johann von Melem the Younger, who had laid the first stone of the Stone House, succeeded him in managing the trading company. Unlike his father, he was also involved in city administration alongside his business activities. His career foreshadowed the future of his descendants, who increasingly lived off the family’s wealth and land holdings, focusing on politics rather than commerce. In 1486, he joined the patrician society Zum Frauenstein, and from 1511 until his death in 1529, he served on the city council, even acting as junior mayor in 1516.

The Stone House remained in the family for generations. Ogier von Melem, son of Johann von Melem the Younger, joined the patrician society Alten Limpurg in 1522 after marrying Brun von Brunfels. This marked the Melem family’s establishment among Frankfurt’s highest social ranks within 60 years of arriving in the city. Ogier, who died in 1575, and his son of the same name, who died in 1611, heavily mortgaged the house. In 1607, the latter, Ogier von Melem, sold his half of the house for 2,040 guilders to the guardians of Juliane Margarete Steffan, who married Johann Philipp Weiß von Limpurg in 1610. The other half was already owned by Juliane, granddaughter of one of Ogier’s sisters.

In 1642, Johann Philipp Weiß handed the house to his son-in-law, Johann Hektor von Holzhausen, in exchange for an annual payment of 250 guilders. After his father-in-law’s death in 1644, the house became his property. He was succeeded by his son, Johann Maximilian. His death in 1708 marked the end of an era in which the Stone House passed through family ties alone. Nearly 50 years earlier, the Melem family had died out with Philipp Ludwig von Melem, who died in 1654 as Frankfurt’s envoy to the Imperial Diet in Regensburg.

=== From joint ownership to municipal property (1708 to 1898) ===
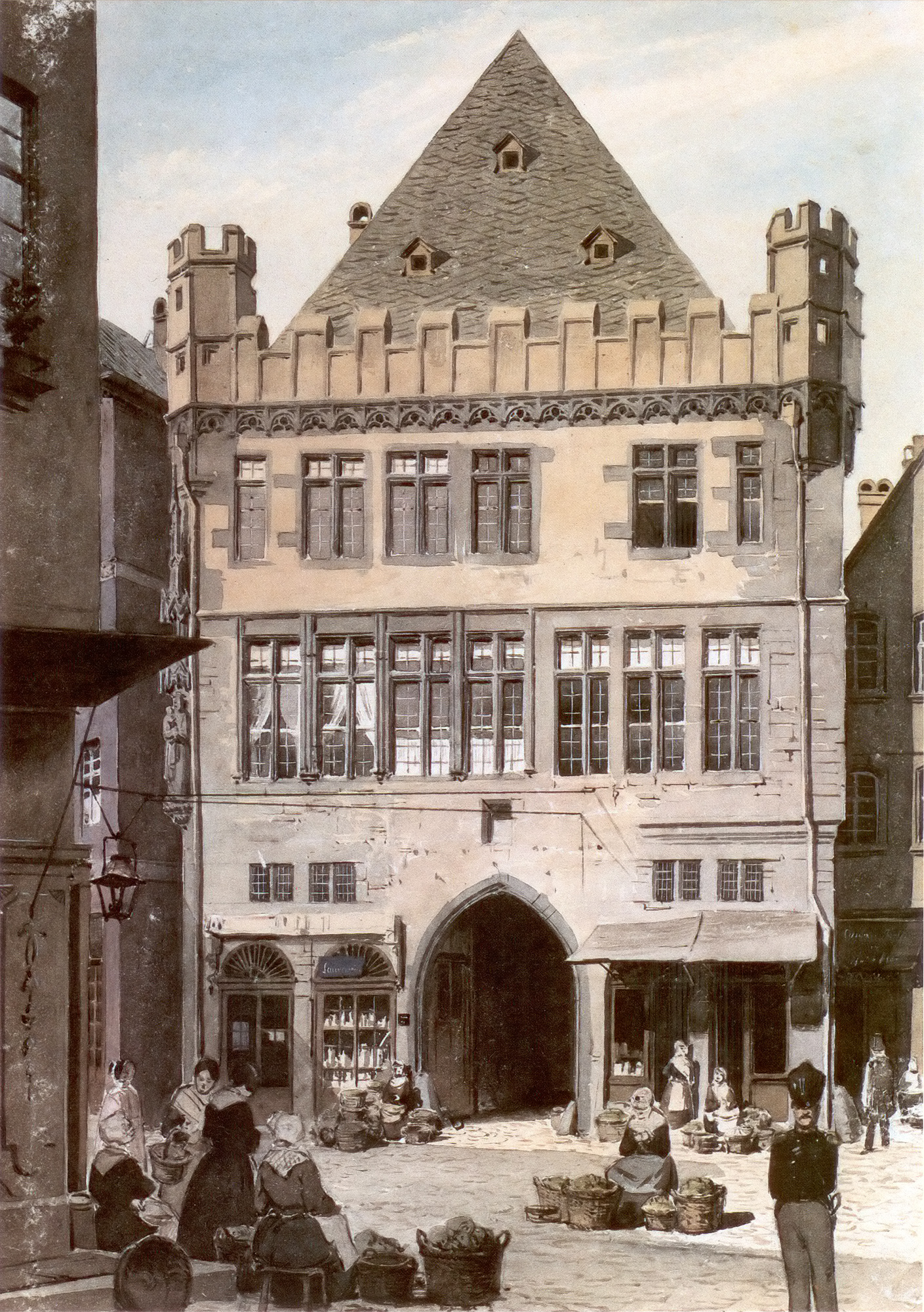
Watercolour by Carl Theodor Reiffenstein, 1845

In 1708, the six remaining heirs established a joint estate. Among them were prominent families: Maria Sibylla Ruland (née Glauburg), Anna Sibylla von Holzhausen (née von Lersner), Johann Philipp von Stalburg, Johann Hieronymus, and Justinian von Holzhausen. As evidenced by its last Holzhausen owner, the estate primarily rented the building to middle-class families for income and no longer used it as a residence. Among the many tenants over the next two centuries, one from the 18th century stands out: around 1750, the French painting and drawing teacher Roland established an art school in the building, notable for its exceptionally free teaching style. Goethe’s sister, Cornelia, is likely the most famous documented pupil of the institution.

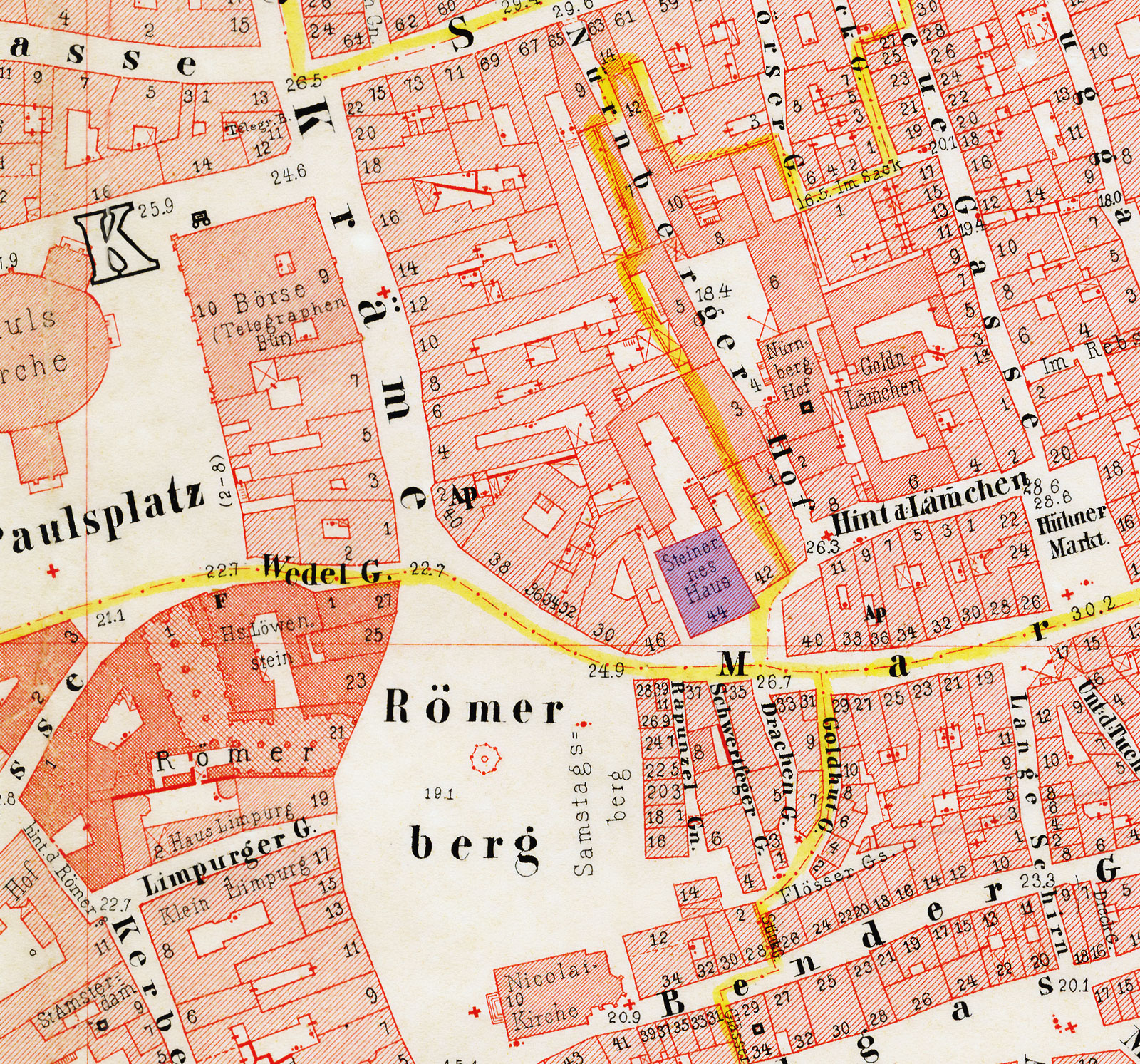
Buildings on Frankfurt’s Ravenstein Plan from 1861

When renting became difficult in the early 19th century due to the declining importance of the old town, the joint owners allowed tenants to sublet vacant rooms independently. Two developments contributed to this decline: the French occupation and the blockade of trade with England, combined with industrialisation, reduced the traditional trade fair business to an economically insignificant annual market within decades. Additionally, the fall of the Holy Roman Empire of the German Nation in 1806 ended imperial coronations and associated celebrations. Tax records from the time illustrate the economic impact: during Johann Hektor von Holzhausen’s ownership, regular rents yielded 172 guilders and 30 kreuzers, while renting to trade fair visitors brought in 325 guilders, accounting for nearly two-thirds of the building’s income. Renting out front rooms with excellent market views during coronations was also lucrative, as owners reserved this right in all rental agreements.

Despite these challenges, the building served as a meeting place in 1848 and 1849 for the conservative faction of the Frankfurt National Assembly, which convened in the nearby Paulskirche. Under Joseph von Radowitz, the Ultramontanes, including notable figures like Ignaz von Döllinger, August Reichensperger, and Beda Weber, gathered regularly to discuss church and school issues.

By the mid-19th century, during the Wilhelminian construction boom on the city’s outskirts, the Stone House and the old town fell into disrepair, suffering significant damage to their exterior and interior decoration. Until then, it had remained largely unchanged since the 15th century. With road construction and the demolition of medieval buildings in the old town, the Melem family’s Frankfurt home was at greater risk than ever.

=== From municipal property to the Second World War (1898 to 1944) ===
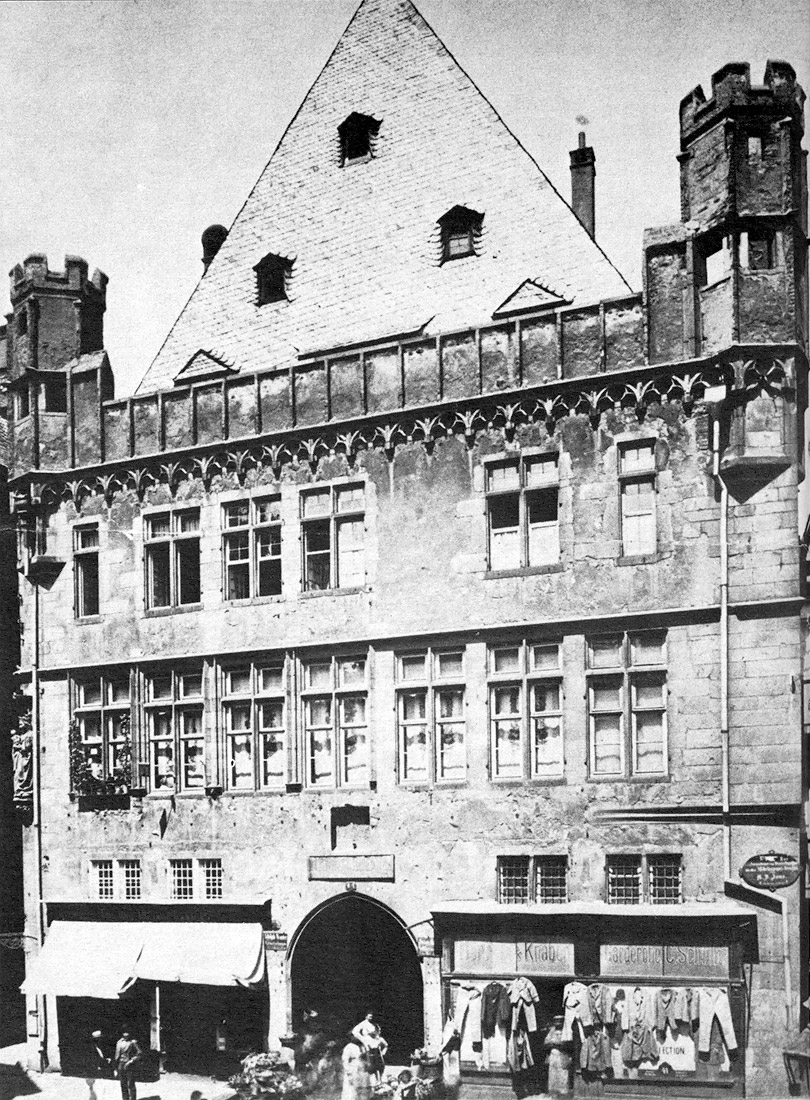
Stone House before renovation, 1880

In the 1880s, the city of Frankfurt began acquiring significant civic buildings in the old town and restoring them to prevent further decay and preserve them as architectural monuments. Examples include the Haus zur Goldenen Waage (purchased in 1898, restored in 1899, destroyed in 1944) and the Große und Kleine Engel (purchased and restored in 1906, destroyed in 1944, reconstructed in 1982). In 1898, the city acquired the Steinerne Haus, one of the last remaining Gothic stone buildings in Frankfurt, alongside the Haus Fürsteneck and the Leinwandhaus. The joint owners, despite minor changes in family ownership, were paid 250,000 marks for the property. The magistrate’s rationale for the purchase emphasised preserving the building as a historical monument:

The city must attach great importance to acquiring ownership of a building that is of such outstanding significance for Frankfurt’s architectural history, thereby preventing such an architectural monument from gradually falling into disrepair or even being destroyed.

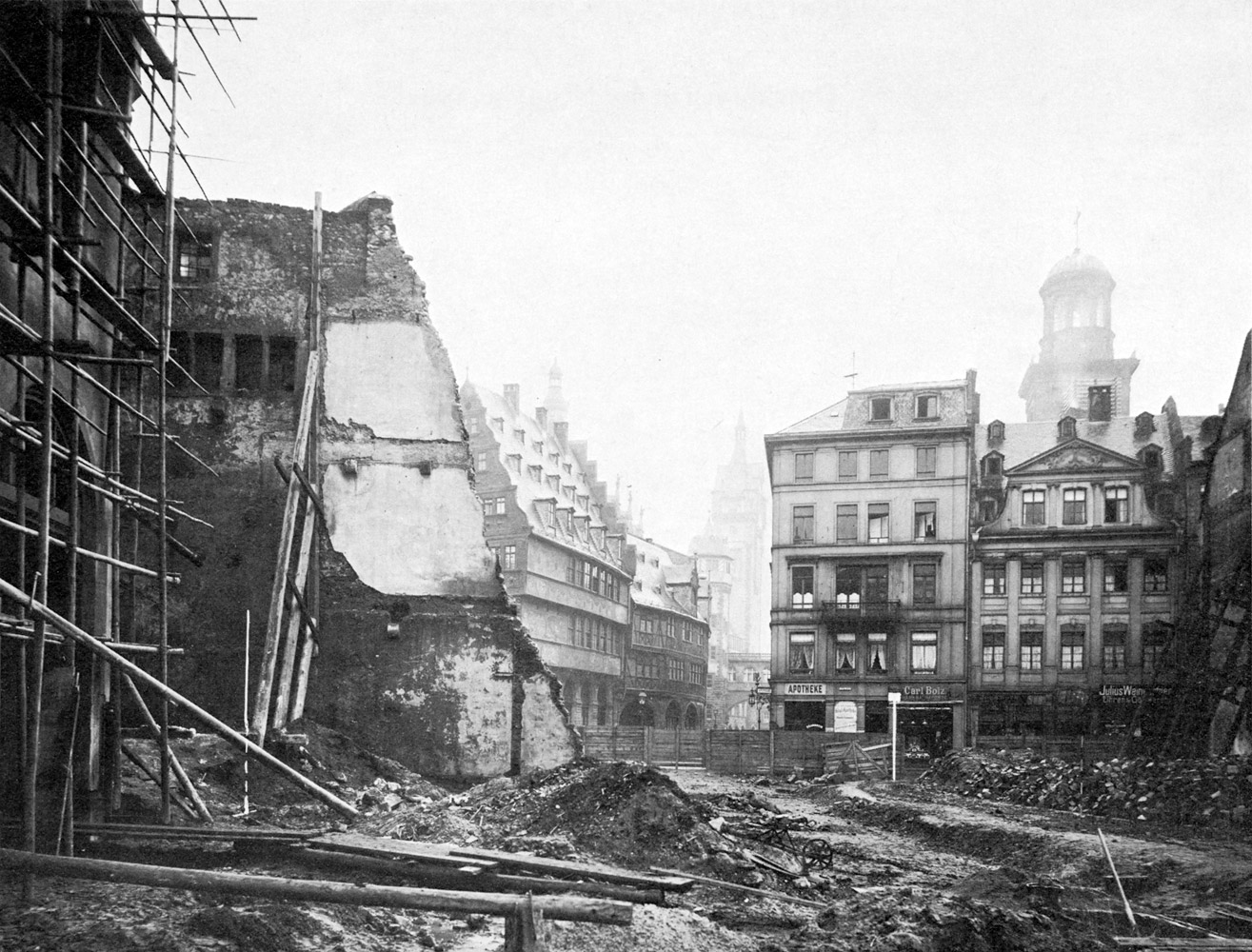
Breakthrough of Braubachstraße, 1904

However, not all old town buildings were preserved, as shown by the construction of Braubachstraße between 1904 and 1906, which demolished over a hundred buildings, including many medieval half-timbered houses. Among these were the rear buildings of the Steinerne Haus in 1904, though the gap was immediately filled with a historicist building facing Braubachstraße. Designed as an upscale restaurant, it featured neo-Gothic forms consistent with the style of the market square façade. At the suggestion of artists, the city transferred the building to the Frankfurt Artists’ Society, which had frequently used it as a meeting place. To fund a thorough renovation, the Artists’ Society organised an Old Town Festival in the Römer’s banquet halls on 6–8 April 1905, recreating the atmosphere of a medieval imperial coronation. The event was successful, yielding a net profit of 60,000 marks.

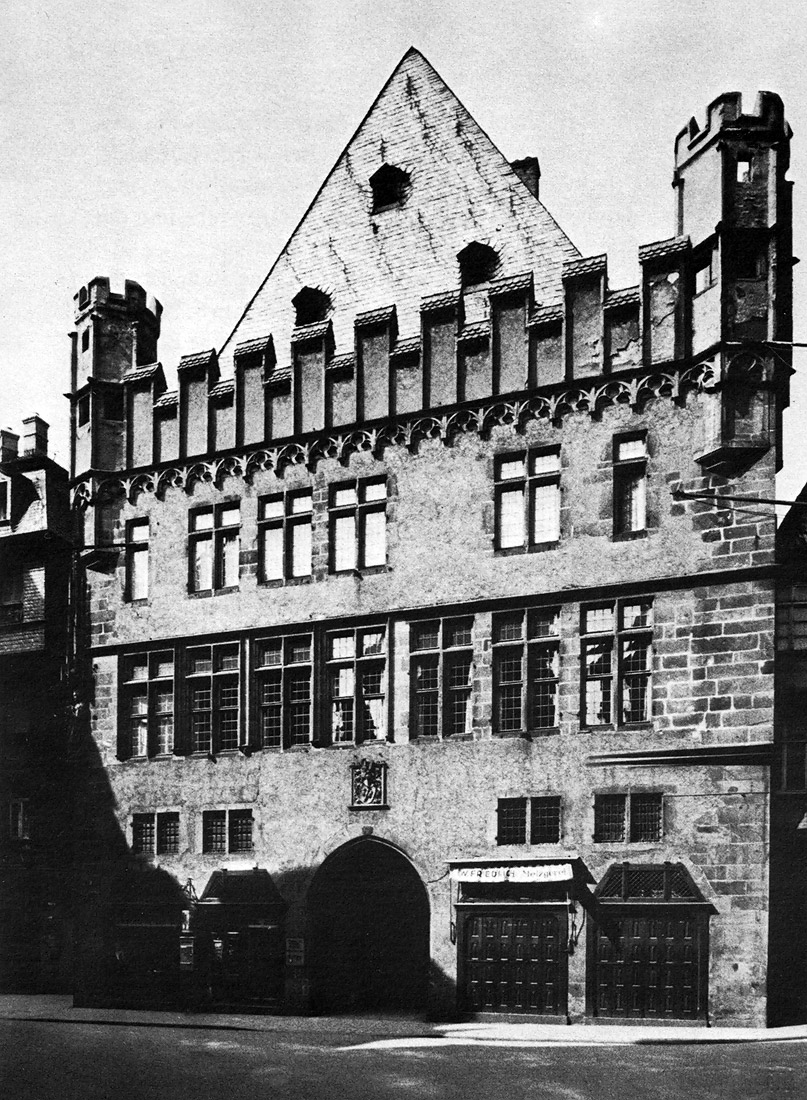
Stone House after renovation, c. 1910

The Stone House was extensively renovated under architect Franz von Hoven, with stylistically inappropriate fixtures removed, valuable parts exposed, and modern lighting, cloakrooms, and toilets installed. The Artists’ Society held its inauguration ceremony on 19 January 1907, shortly after completion. With exhibitions and publications, the house gained recognition beyond Frankfurt. The original Gothic exterior and decorations were partially reconstructed, including the battlemented cornice (bricked up in 1842) and the canopy over the Madonna statue on the southwest corner (demolished in 1872), which were restored to their original form.

=== World War II, reconstruction, and the present day (1944 to today) ===
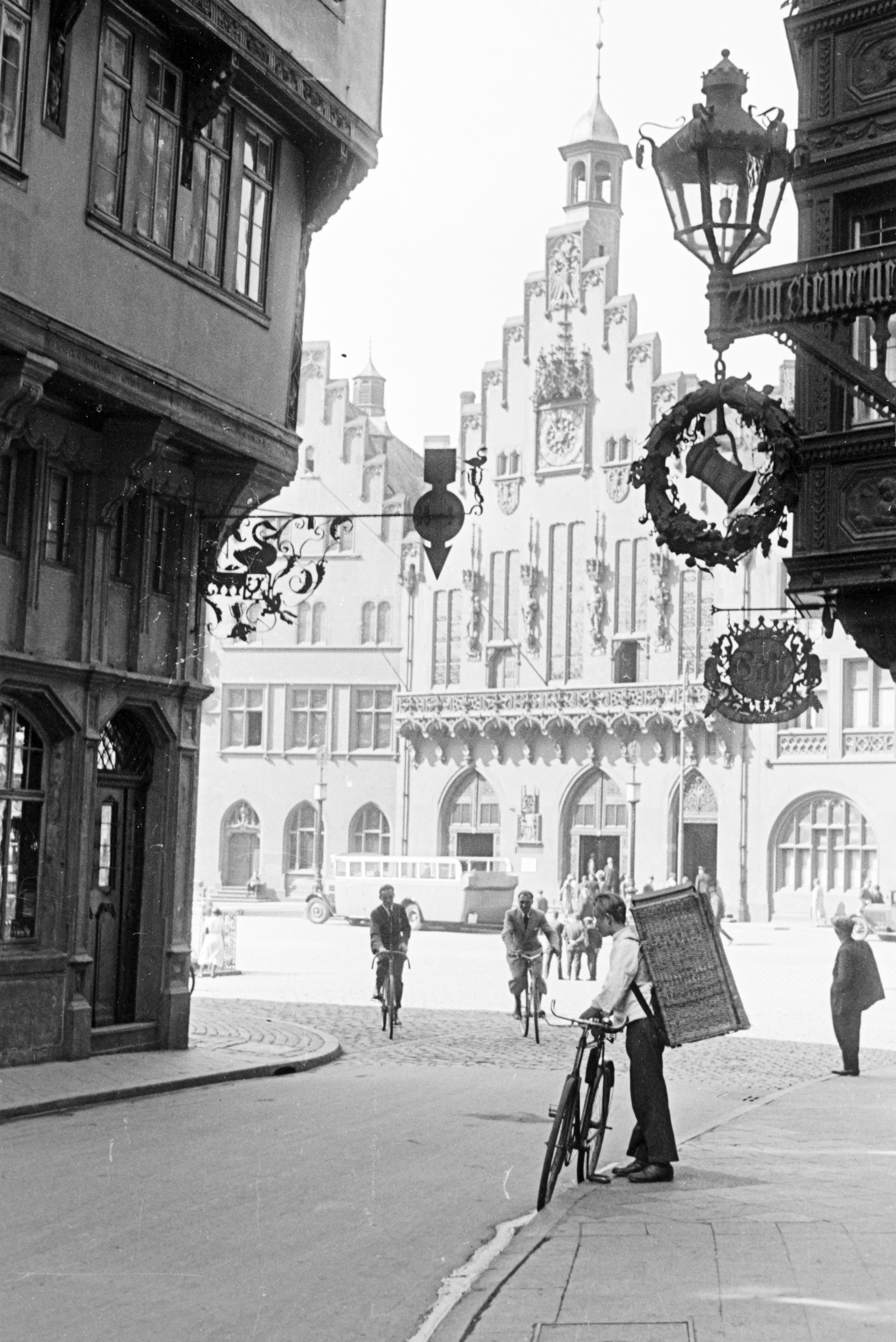
View from the corner of the Stone House towards the Römer, mid-1930s

During the Second World War, the building was gutted by fire during an air raid on 22 March 1944, which reduced much of the old town to rubble. Its solid construction preserved the outer walls initially, but on 24 March 1944, a high-explosive bomb destroyed the façade due to the lack of internal structural stability. From an art history perspective, the loss of the Gothic interior is particularly significant. Miraculously, the Gothic vault with the stone coats of arms of the Melem couple in the ground-floor gateway and the historicist building on Braubachstraße survived nearly intact.

While the ruins of the old town were cleared in the early 1950s and replaced with functional buildings, the Stone House was spared. Between 1959 and 1962, it was rebuilt at a cost of 2.4 million Deutschmarks (approximately 4 million euros today), an unusually high amount for the time. Unlike many other reconstructions, the focus was on fidelity to the original exterior; alongside the Goethe House, it was the only civilian building in the old town reconstructed. However, the interior was rebuilt in a functional 1960s style and returned to the art association. A modern extension was added to the east side to increase usable space and ensure accessibility. On 8 November 1962, the reconstructed Steinerne Haus was officially opened with an Edvard Munch exhibition and has since served as one of Frankfurt’s art centres with exhibition rooms. The northern part of Braubachstraße, after minor war damage repairs, resumed use as a restaurant and remains unchanged.

As part of the Dom-Römer Project, the historically significant alleys Markt and Hinter dem Lämmchen were rebuilt between 2013 and 2018 south and east of the Stone House, with small-scale buildings, some reconstructed based on historical models. The Frankfurter Kunstverein added a second entrance to the modern extension, opening east onto Hinter dem Lämmchen. In September 2018, the outdoor sculpture Die Große Illusion by Wolfgang Winter and Berthold Hörbelt was installed on the extension’s façade. Together with the new entrance, it forms a visual axis from the Hühnermarkt through Hinter dem Lämmchen, contrasting modern and reconstructed architecture.

== Architecture ==
=== General ===
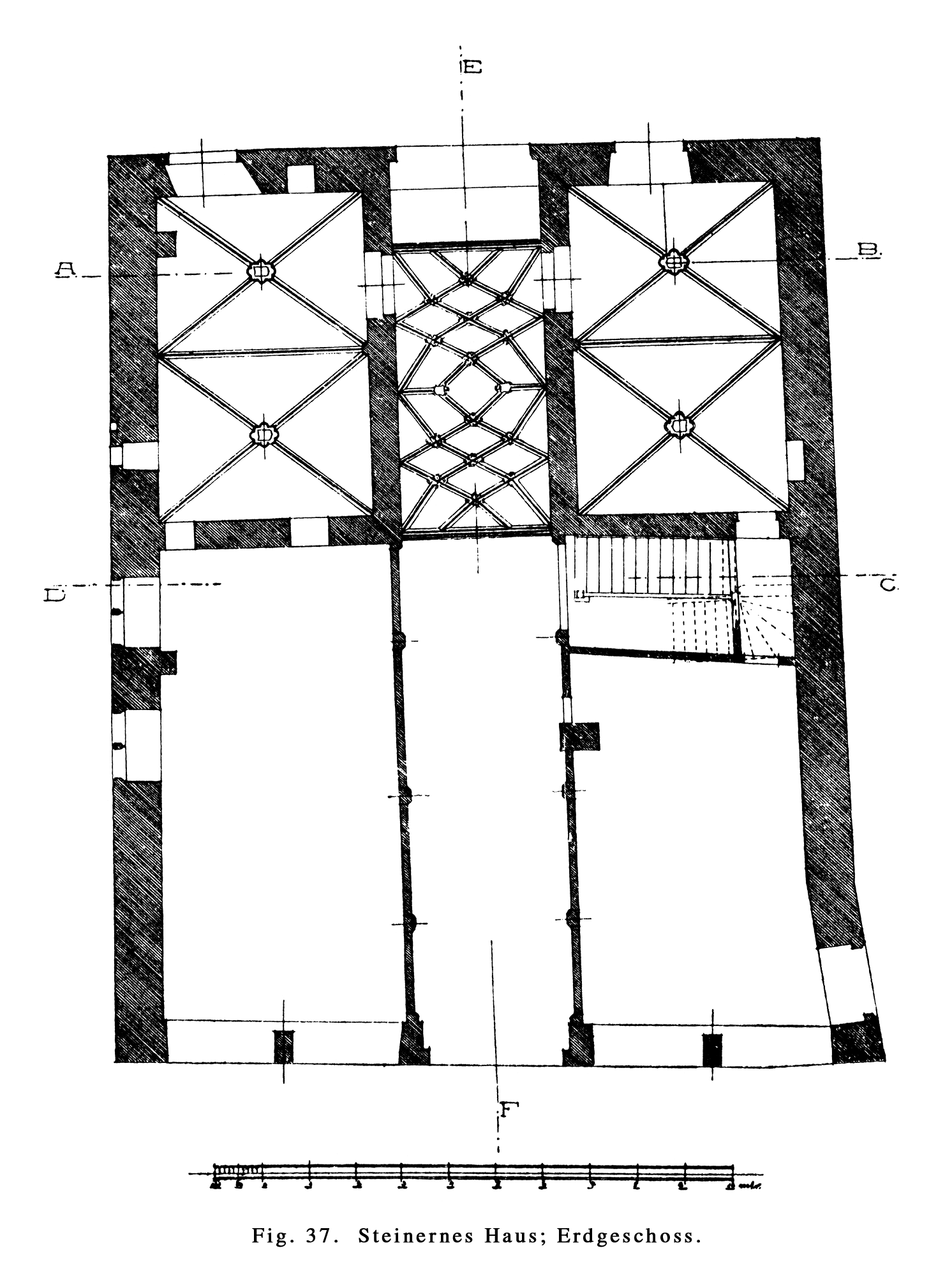
Plan of the ground floor, c. 1900

The Steinerne Haus is the last remaining secular building of its kind in Frankfurt, one of about twenty Gothic stone buildings in the medieval old town. Only a few, such as the Großer Braunfels and the Fürsteneck, survived into the 20th century, but all were destroyed in the Second World War. The Leinwandhaus, rebuilt in the 1980s and architecturally similar, was classified as a public secular building since its construction in 1399.

In terms of historical preservation, the Stone House retains little medieval character; although the exterior walls were largely preserved (except the façade), they were mostly demolished during reconstruction. The intense heat of the firestorm weakened the plaster, as Fried Lübbecke reported in 1944, and prolonged exposure to weather allowed moisture to penetrate the masonry.

Today, apart from the preserved ground-floor vaulted ceiling and small sections of the outer walls, the Stone House consists largely of 1950s materials. The interior changed more between its destruction in 1944 and reconstruction in 1962 than in the previous 500 years.

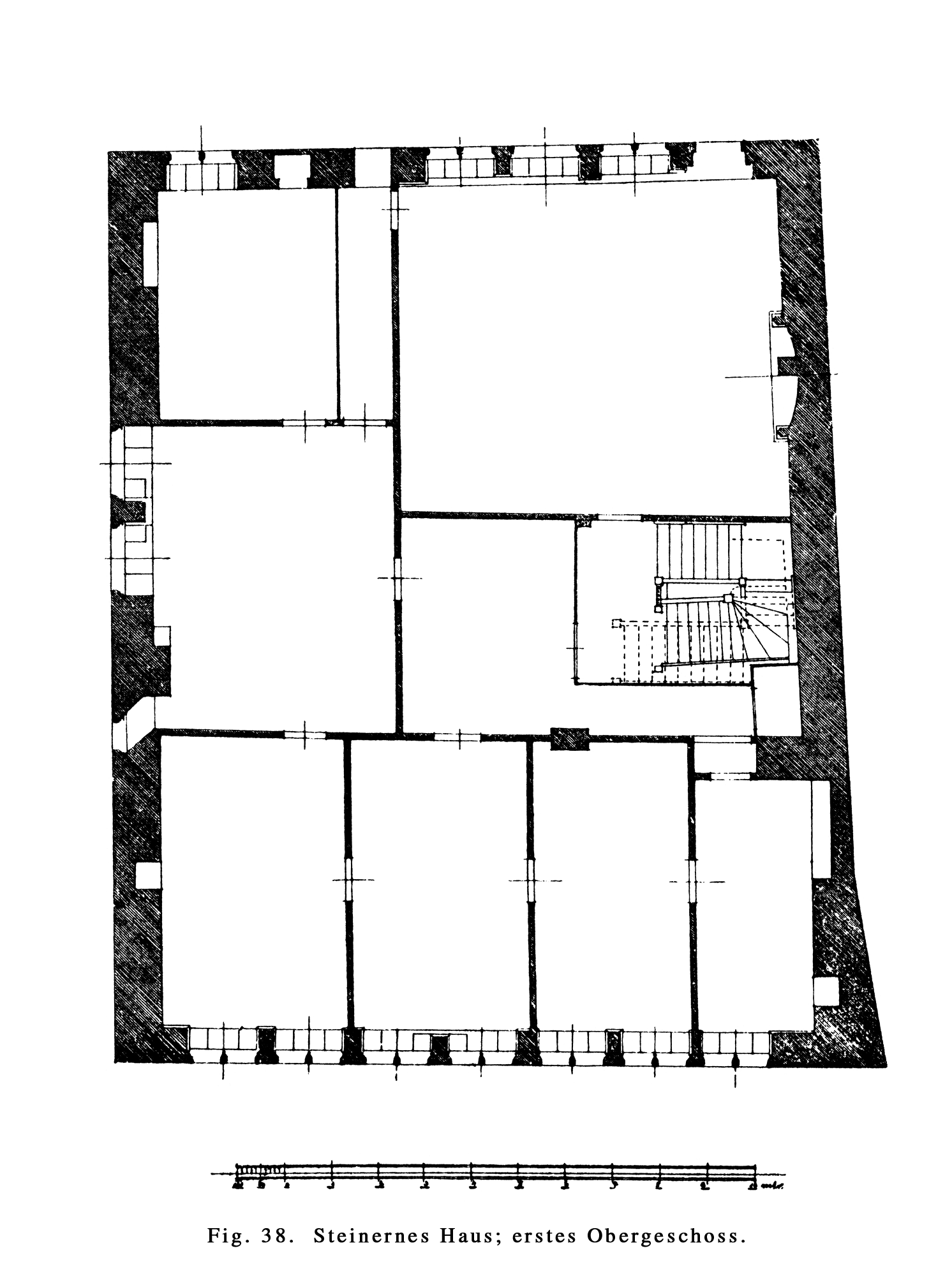
Plan of the first floor, c. 1900

=== Appearance ===
==== General description ====
The massive outer walls cover an almost square plot, enormous by medieval standards, measuring approximately 15 meters wide and 20 meters deep. An obtuse angle at the southeast corner reflects the original floor plan of the Bornfleck house, demolished in 1464. The medieval architect compensated for this asymmetry with a cornice located only at the southeast corner between the ground floor and the first floor. Thus, only the ground-floor masonry follows the asymmetrical plan up to the cornice, while the upper floors are aligned straight.

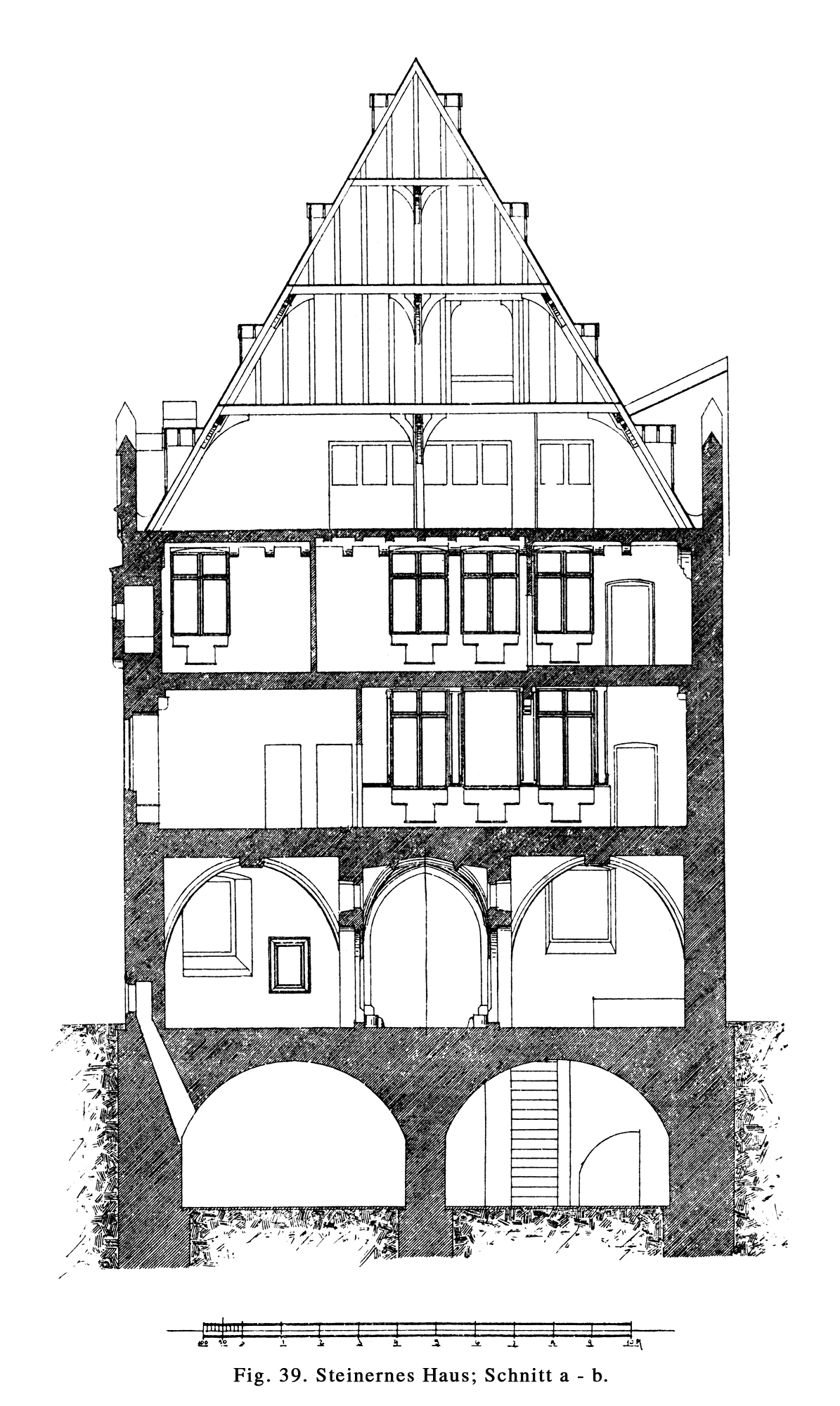
Cross-section in an east-west direction, c. 1900

The market-facing façade is divided vertically into five sections on the ground floor by a large pointed arch gate with two round arches on either side. The horizontal division is visible externally; the house has three stories, with the first and second separated by a strong cornice. The ground floor connects to a low mezzanine floor, known as the bobbelage, characteristic of medieval Frankfurt houses, used for storage, while the ground floor stores goods for trade fairs.

In the bobbelage section, above the pointed archway, a stone carving depicts the Melem family coat of arms, flanked by small rectangular windows above each round arch. The upper floors feature numerous crossbar windows, large for their time but irregularly distributed.

The first floor has a group of four evenly spaced windows next to a group of three, differing in material and profile. The first group, made of red Mainsandstone, is framed by separate profile strips; the second, made of basalt like other windows, lacks these strips. The second floor, separated by a horizontal cornice, has a narrow window on the far left, followed by a group of three equally sized windows, a large open space, a single window matching the group, and a very narrow half-crossbar window on the right.

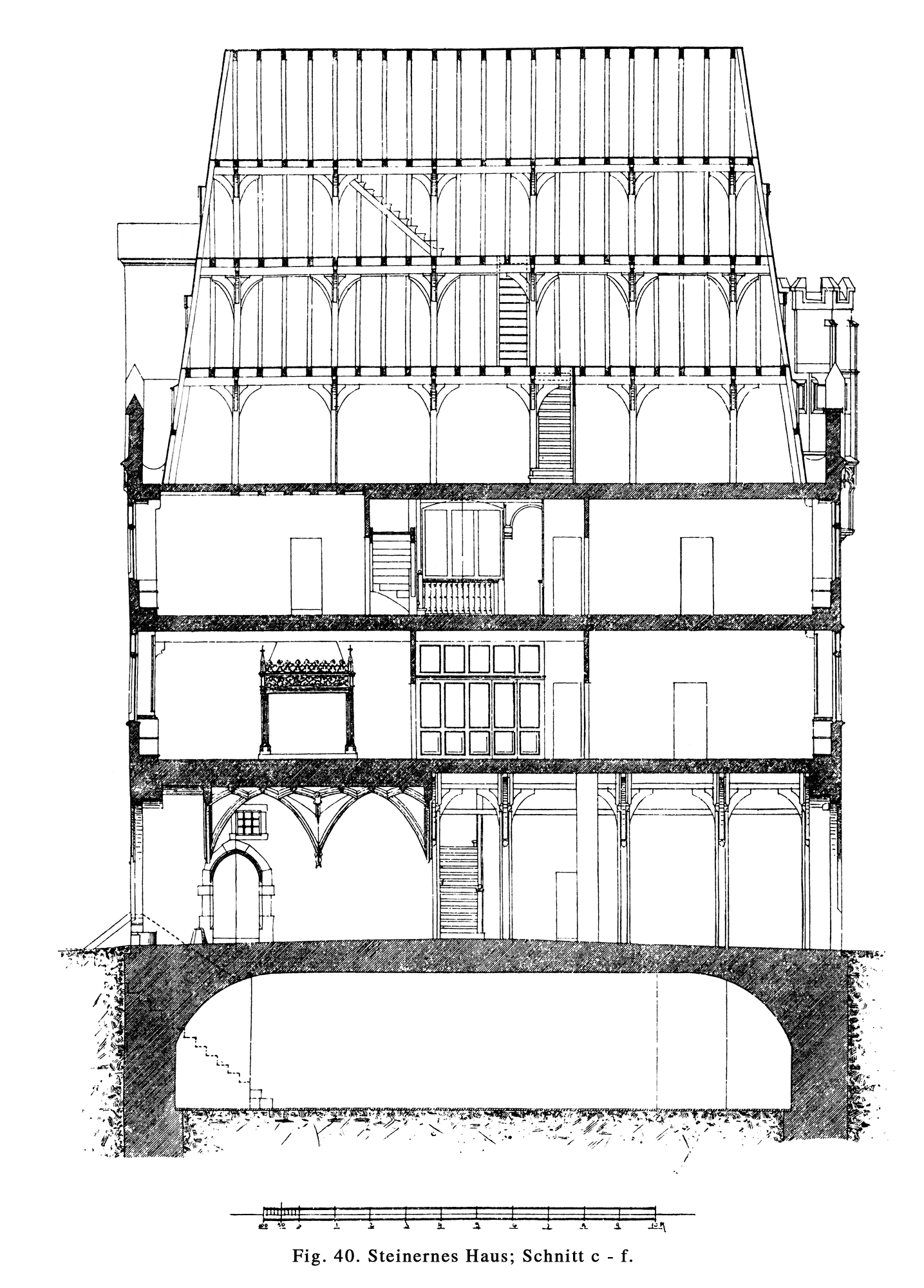
Cross-section in north-south direction, c. 1900

A walkable battlement with a crenelated parapet runs around the steep hipped roof above the second floor, ending—on the street front only—in two-story corner turrets, also crowned with battlements. A trifore frieze, a classic Gothic element, runs beneath the battlements. The hipped roof houses four attic floors, lit by small dormers.

==== The Madonna at the Stone House ====
On the southwestern corner, at the first-floor level, a Madonna figure has stood since the building’s construction. An old legend describes its origins.

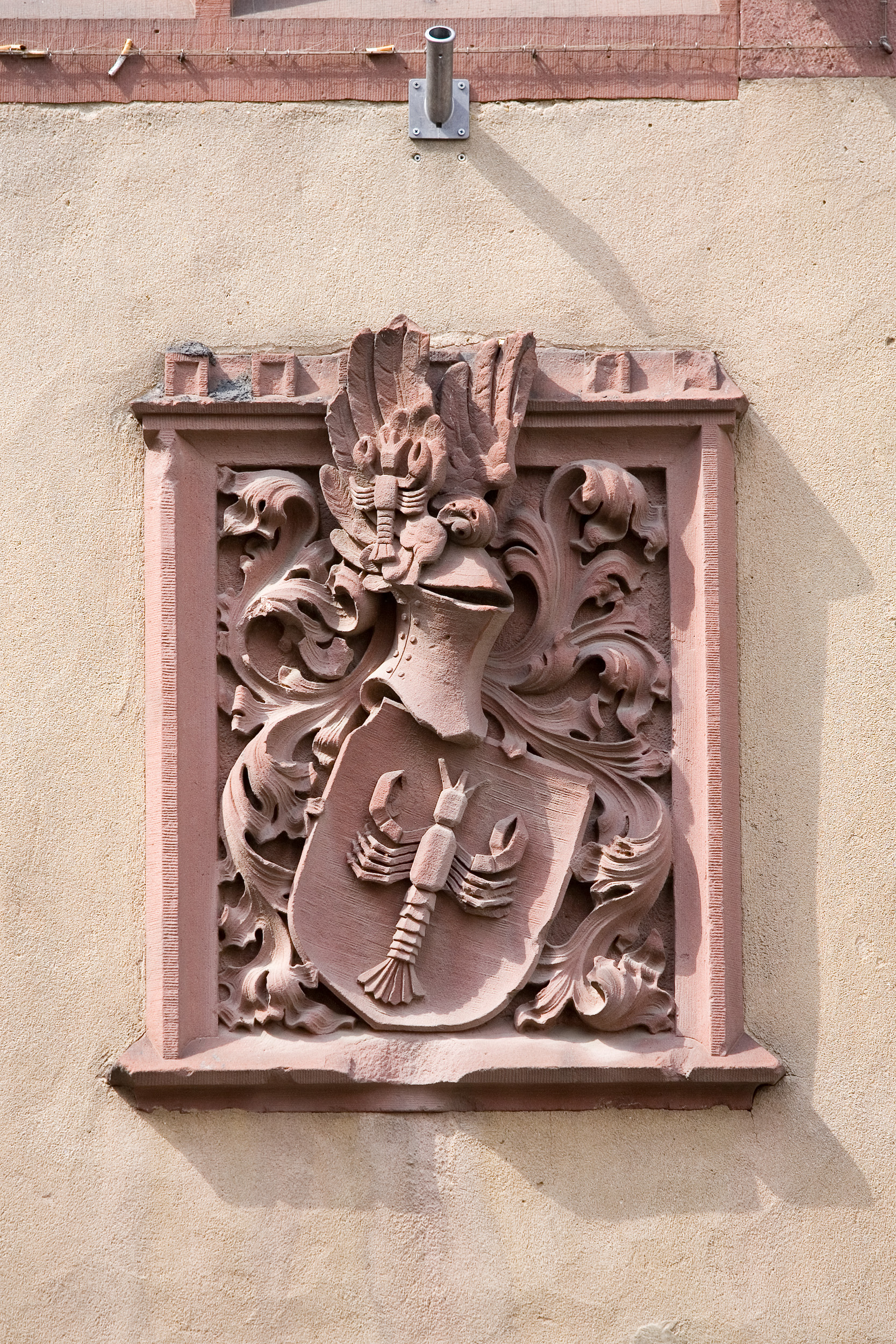
Coat of arms of the Melem family

Johann von Melem commissioned a young Frankfurt stonemason named Andreas to create a Madonna for the Römerberg-facing side, as was customary in the Middle Ages. Andreas, who had trained in Italy and returned with a recommendation from Melem’s trading partners, worked in a workshop within the house. One evening, he saw Ursula, Melem’s younger daughter and a childhood playmate, behind a window. They fell in love but recognised the impossibility of a relationship between a craftsman and a patrician’s daughter.

A merchant’s son from Cologne soon sought Ursula’s hand, and Melem agreed, setting a wedding date and tasking Andreas to complete the statue by then. Shortly before the wedding, Ursula and her parents passed Andreas’s workshop, finding it tidy and deserted, with the Madonna and Child—bearing Ursula’s features—in the centre. Andreas had left town the previous night, never to return, and another craftsman completed the canopy. According to legend, Ursula asked her father to cancel the wedding to remain unmarried.

However, the Melem family register states that Ursula married Frankfurt patrician Walter Schwarzenberg and, after his death, Bernhard Rohrbach. Her older sister Katharina married patrician Jakob Heller.

The current Madonna is a copy of the original, which was severely damaged during the war, with fragments preserved in the Historical Museum. The canopy is a mediocre replacement for the original, a masterfully crafted work of medieval stonemasonry with pinnacles and fleurons, demolished in 1872 after complaints from market women about its deteriorating condition. Some fragments were saved and used for a partial reconstruction in the early 20th century, but the current canopy, replaced during reconstruction, is simpler. Given the available documentation, restoring the original state is feasible.

==== References to Middle Rhine architecture ====
Features of the Stone House—such as the mezzanine floor (rare in Frankfurt’s stone buildings), floor-separating cornice, excessive window jamb profiling, and half-crossbar windows—are absent in other local medieval stone buildings, which are no longer preserved.

In 1461, Johann von Melem owned the Gothic Saaleck House in Cologne. Despite being built of quarry stones, it shares the mentioned features with the Stone House, built three years later. These Middle Rhine influences, particularly from Cologne, are evident. However, as was typical in old Frankfurt, these remained imports and were not replicated locally. Notably, the Cologne building also features a Madonna in a prominent, elaborately ornamented corner niche, though this is not definitively linked to Middle Rhine influence.

Haus Saaleck was largely destroyed by firebombs on 31 May 1942 but was reconstructed by 1957 using much of the original fabric. Apart from minor ground-floor changes, it stands in its original form, exemplifying this late Gothic architectural context.

=== Interior since 1962 ===
Despite efforts to restore the exterior to its original state, the interior reconstruction did not follow suit, as war damage destroyed nearly all interior decoration. Reconstructing it would have required extensive craftsmanship, increasing costs funded by tax revenue.

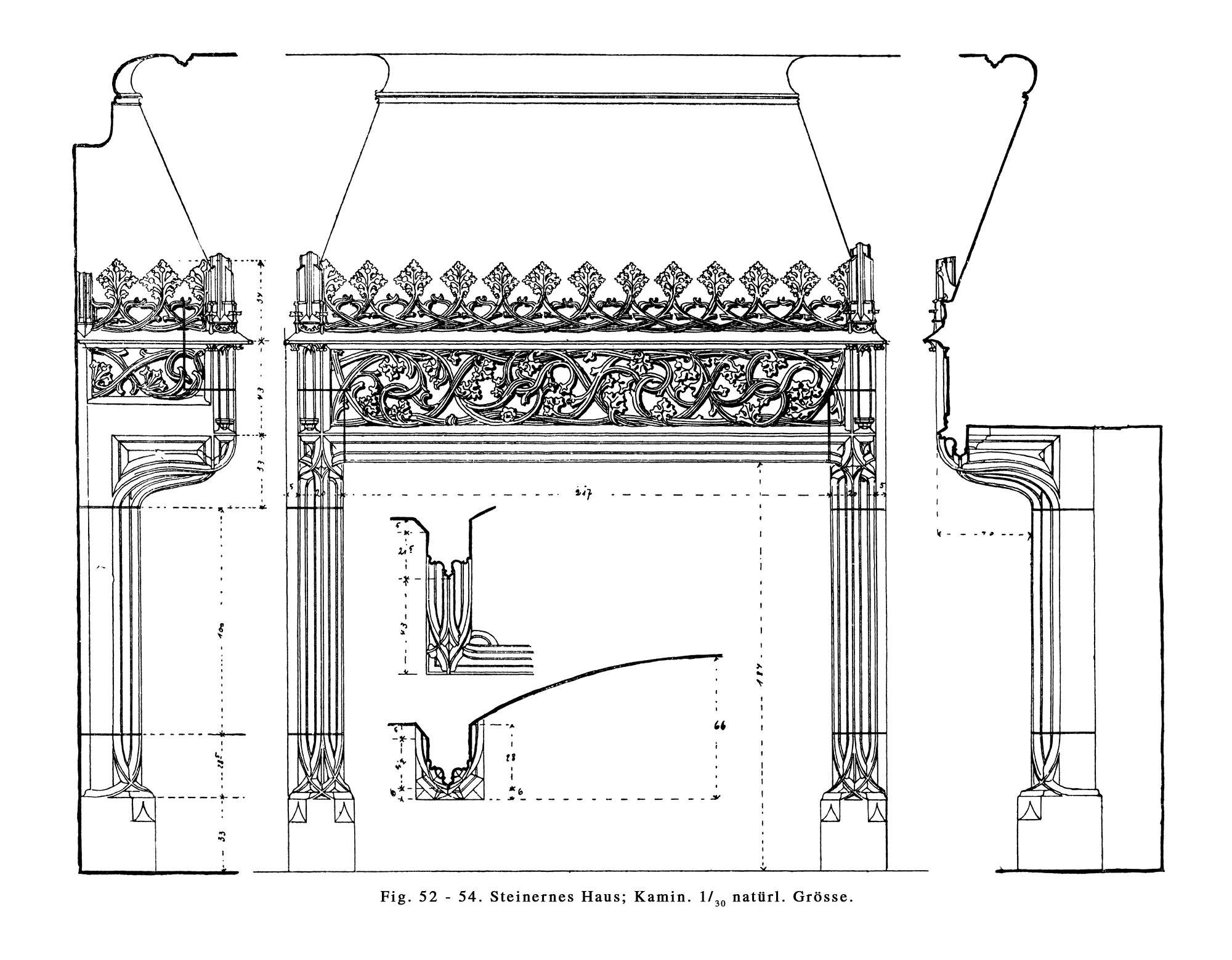
Gothic fireplace on the first floor, around 1900

The floor layout, dictated by the façade, reflects the pre-war state, but the exact floor heights are uncertain. The first and second floors feature light-filled, sober exhibition rooms in the 1960s style. The ground-floor café, with large glass surfaces and unadorned concrete pillars, contrasts with the former Gothic interior. Behind a frosted glass block wall, the ribbed vault with the Melem couple’s coat of arms remains, the only surviving pre-war element.
