= Praying Hands (Dürer) =

Drawing by Albrecht Dürer, c.1508

- Betende Hände (German)
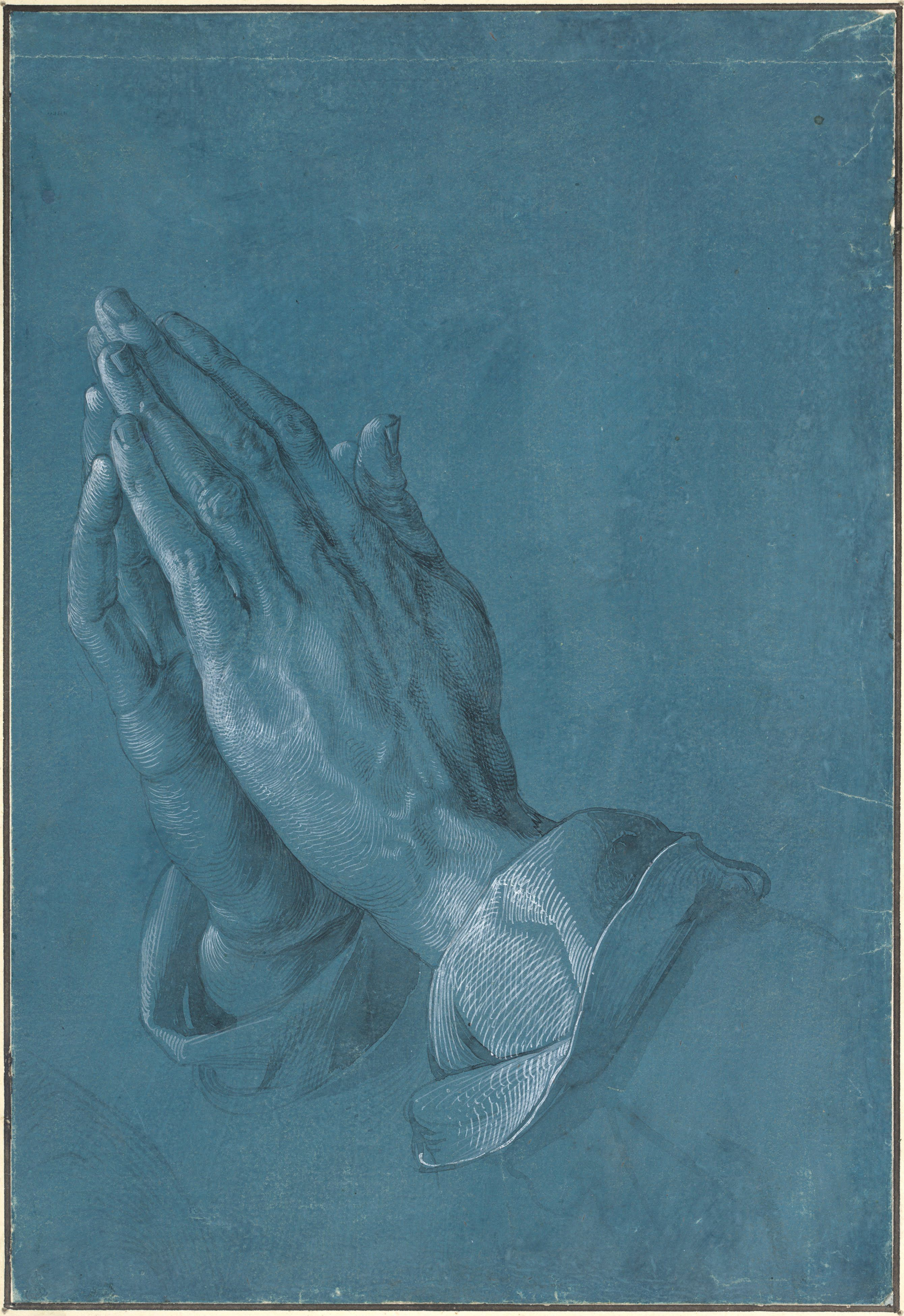
- Artist: Albrecht Dürer
- Year: c. 1508
- Type: Drawing
- Dimensions: 29.1 cm × 19.7 cm (11.5 in × 7.8 in)
- Location: Albertina; Vienna

Praying Hands (German: Betende Hände), also known as Study of the Hands of an Apostle (Studie zu den Händen eines Apostels), is a pen-and-ink drawing by the German printmaker, painter and theorist Albrecht Dürer. The work is today stored at the Albertina museum in Vienna, Austria.

== Overview ==
Dürer created the drawing using the technique of white heightening and black ink on (self-made) blue colored paper. The drawing shows a close up of two male hands clasped together praying. Also, the partly rolled up sleeves are seen.

The drawing used to be considered a sketch (study) for hands of an apostle, whose full picture was planned to occupy the central panel of the triptych installed in Frankfurt entitled the Heller Altarpiece – destroyed by a fire in 1729. The sketched hands appear on the triptych on the right side of the central panel, and although the detail appears very similar, it is smaller in size in the triptych. Recently, a more plausible theory of the drawing is that, in its elaborate execution on precious blue paper, it is rather a virtuoso record of the hands in the painting, which Dürer could bring back with him from Italy to Nuremberg.

The drawing also once contained a sketch of the apostle's head, but the sheet with the head has been separated from it. Overall, Dürer made 18 sketches for the altarpiece. The first public recognition of the artwork was in 1871 when it was exhibited in Vienna, and the image is said to depict the hands of Dürer's brother, one of eighteen siblings.

== Cultural legacy ==
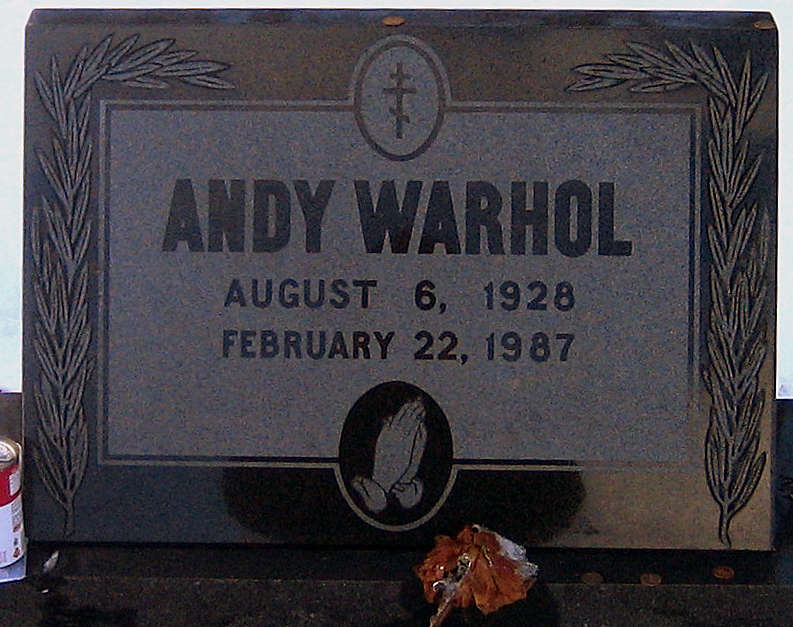
Andy Warhol's tombstone

The image is the most widely reproduced depiction of prayer in the Western world, found on posters, coffee mugs, mobile phones, and has been used as album artwork. Justin Bieber has a reproduction of the image tattooed on his left leg. Canadian hip-hop artist Drake reproduced this image for the cover art of his mixtape, If You're Reading This It's Too Late in 2015. The tombstone of Andy Warhol, who had copied the Praying Hands, features a carving based on the image.

== See also ==
- List of paintings by Albrecht Dürer
