= Heller Altarpiece =

Altarpiece painted by Albrecht Dürer, Matthias Grünewald and Jobst Harrich

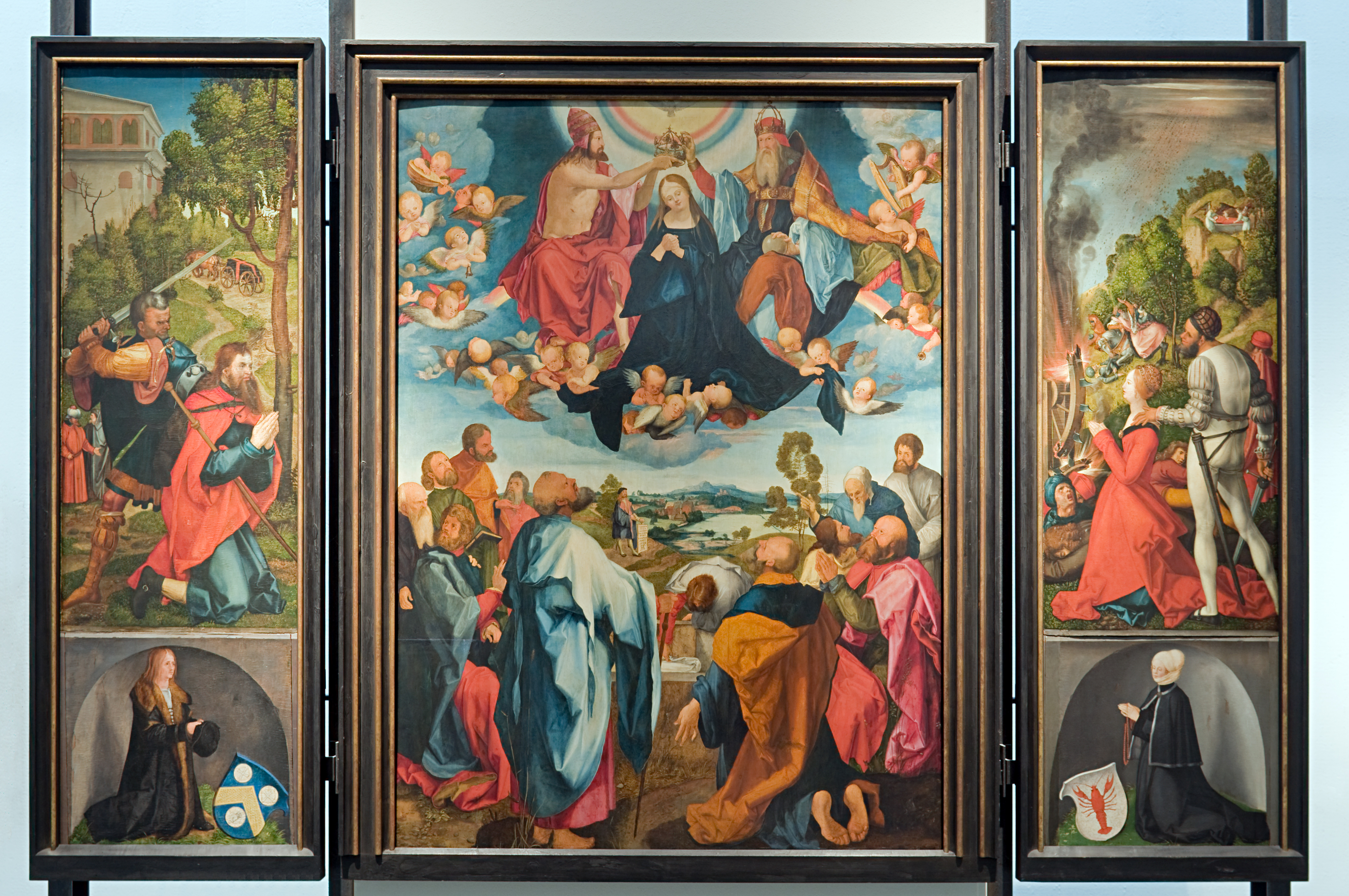
- Artist: Albrecht Dürer/Matthias Grünewald
- Year: 1507-1509
- Medium: Oil on panel
- Location: Städel, Frankfurt, and Staatliche Kunsthalle, Kalrsruhe.

The Heller Altarpiece was an oil on panel triptych by German Renaissance artists Albrecht Dürer and Matthias Grünewald, executed between 1507 and 1509. The artwork was named after Jakob Heller, who ordered it. Dürer painted the interior, Grünewald the exterior.

In 1615, the Dürer copyist Jobst Harrich painted a duplicate, which is now at the Städel of Frankfurt. The side panels, executed by Dürer's workshop basing from his drawings, are at the Staatliche Kunsthalle of Karlsruhe.

== History ==
The painting was commissioned by Frankfurt merchant Jakob Heller, for the Dominican church of the city. In 1615, the central panel, the only one by Dürer alone, was sold to Maximilian I of Bavaria; a copy was ordered to replace the original in its location at the church's high altar. The central panel was destroyed by a fire in Munich in 1729. The famous drawing of two praying hands in the Albertina in Vienna is a study for one of the apostles in the central panel.

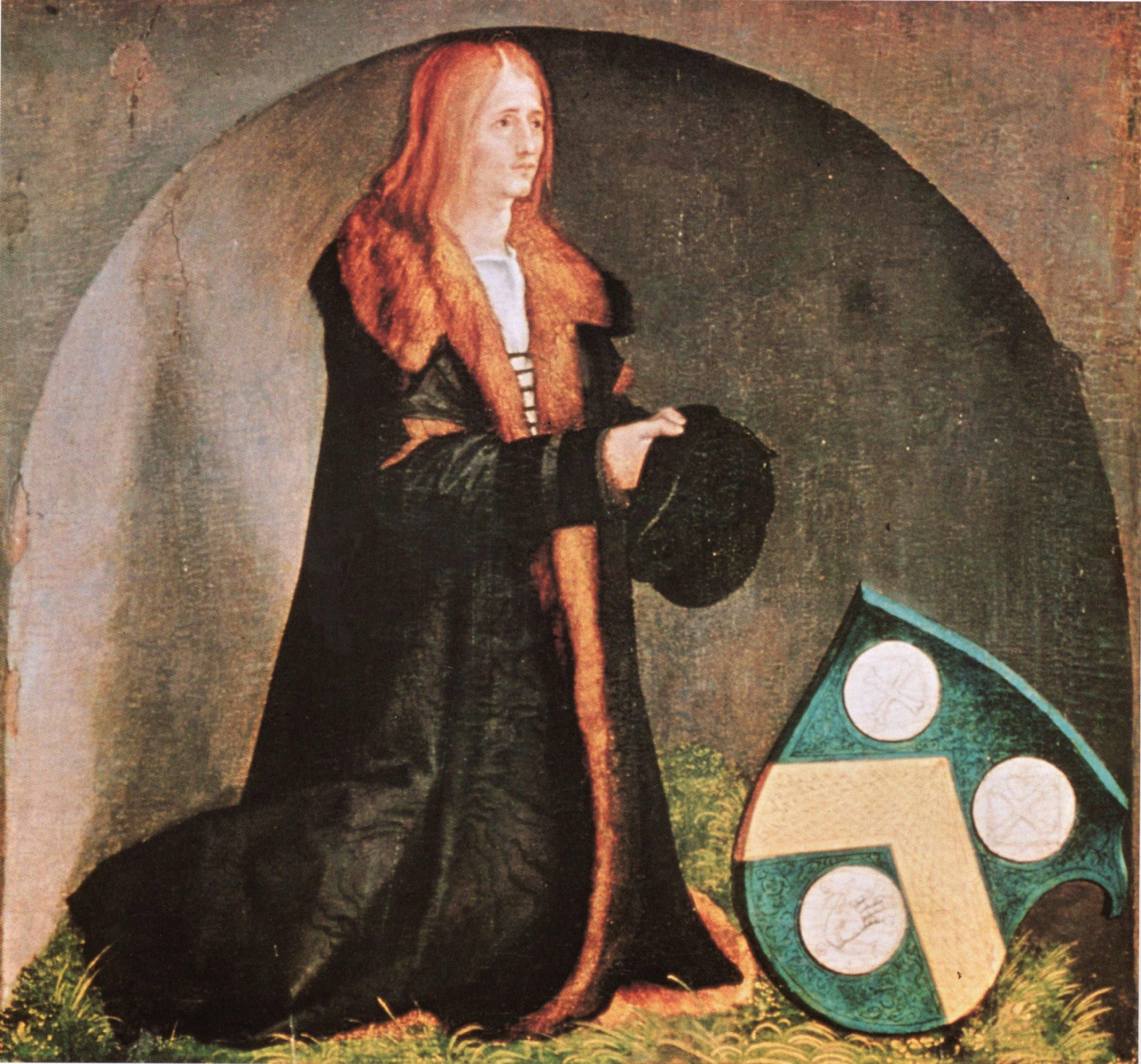
The donor Jacob Heller.

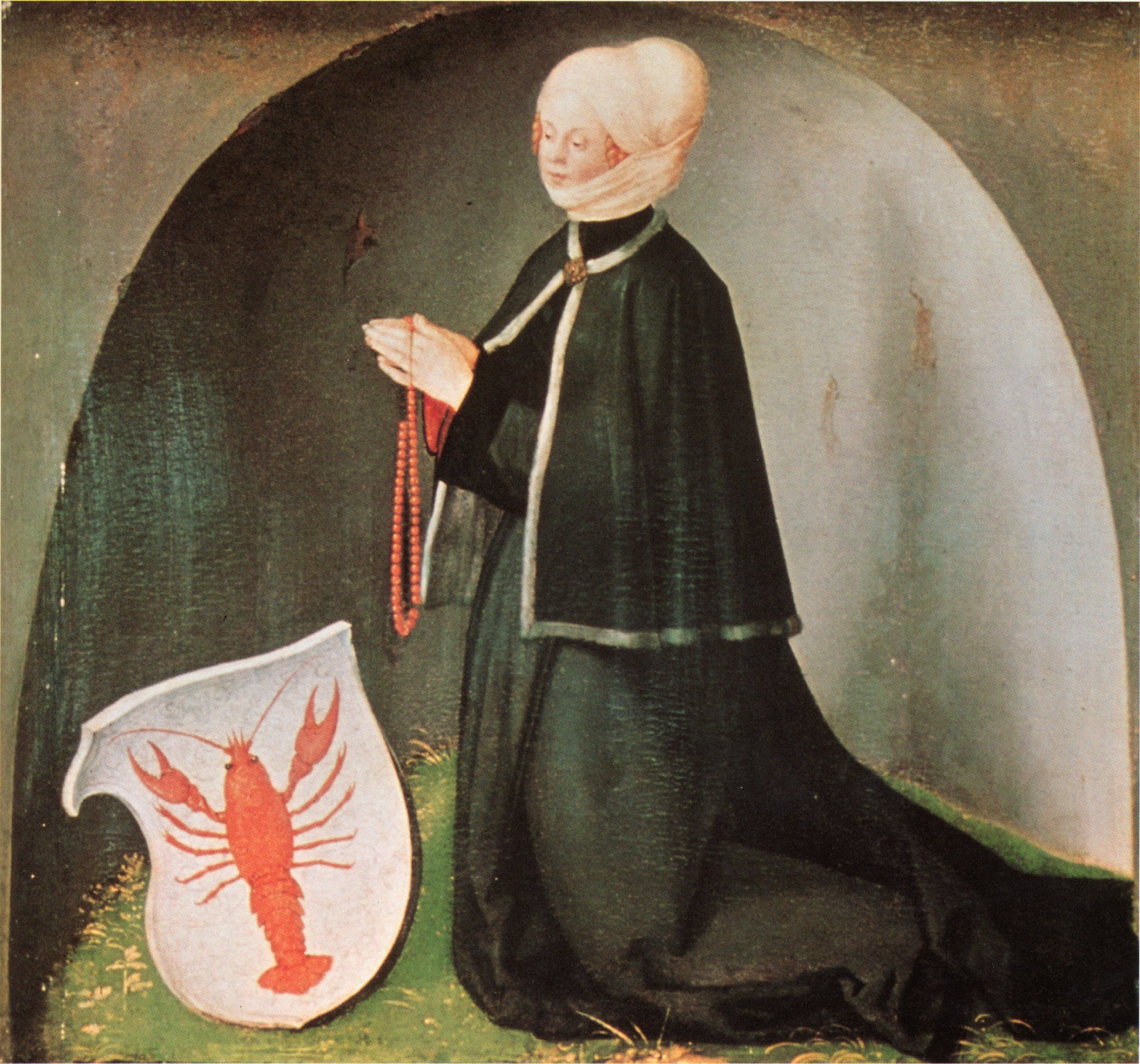
His wife Katharina von Melem.

The side panels, executed by Dürer's assistants, were completed by other four commissioned to Matthias Grünewald in 1510. The side shutters were detached in the 18th century, and each of the two panels composing them were separated in 1804.

== Description ==
The central panel, depicting the Assumption and Coronation of the Virgin, was perhaps inspired by Raphael's Oddi Altarpiece. It is not known if Dürer saw Raphael's work in Perugia, during a hypothetical trip to Rome after his stay in Venice, or if he knew it from etchings or drawings.

Mary is shown while the Holy Trinity (Jesus at right, the Eternal Father at the center and, at top, the Holy Spirit Dove) crowns her, surrounded by a multitude of cherubims; this iconography was popular in northern Europe art at the time, and was used, for example, in a panel by Enguerrand Quarton now at the Louvre Museum (1454). Below, around the empty sepulcher, the apostles observe the scene in astonished postures. Dürer added a self-portrait in the background, next to a table with his signature and the date.

The internal side panels were painted by assistants from Dürer's drawings. At left is he Martyrdom of St. James; Jacob Heller appears below, kneeling inside a niche with his coat of arms. At right is Martyrdom of St. Catherine of Alexandria, with the donor's wife, Katharina von Melem. The choice of the saints was connected to the two donors' names.

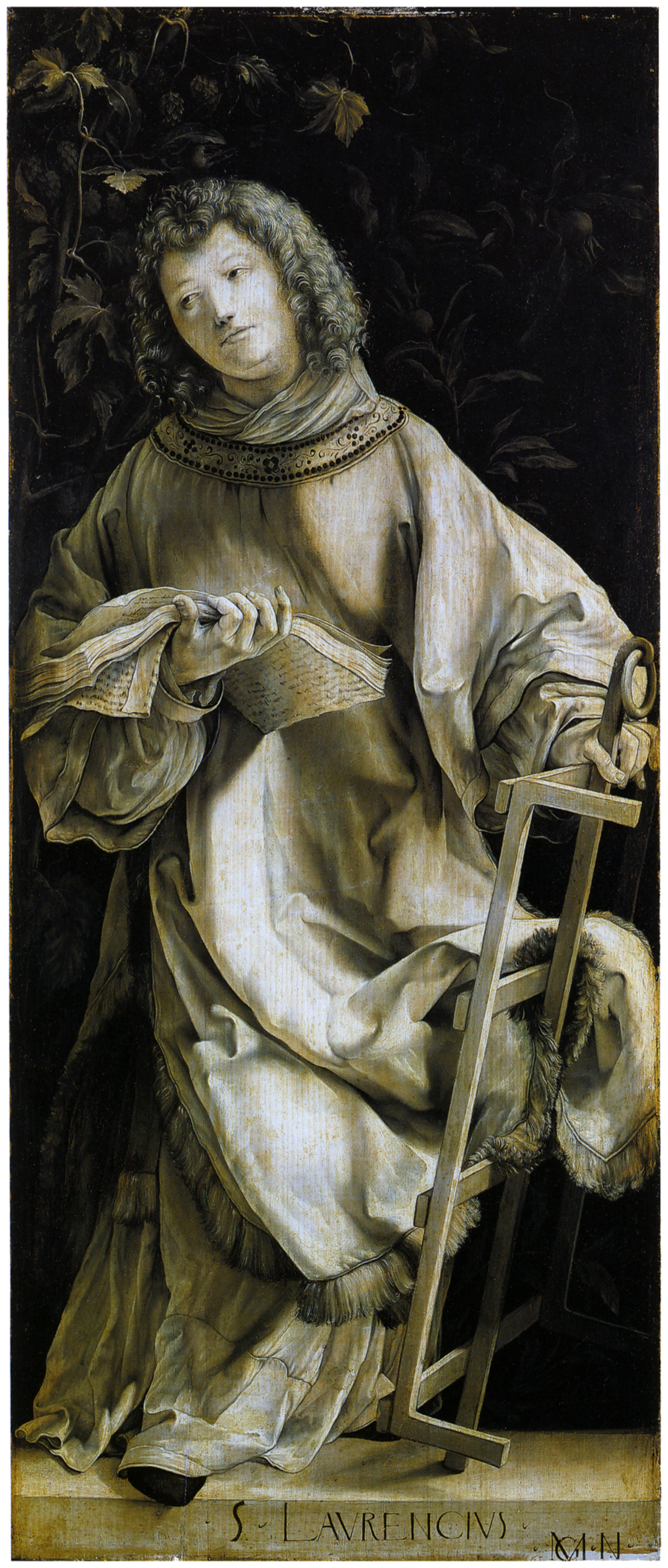
Panel of St. Lawrence by Matthias Grünewald.

The external panels were painted in grisaille, with the participation of a young Matthias Grünewald. They include eight depiction of saints; one, St. Lawrence, is signed "MGN". St. Cyriacus is portrayed during the exorcism of Artemia, daughter of Roman emperor Diocletian. He hold a book with the exorcism formula: ": AVCTORITATE DOMINI NOSTRI IHSVXPHISTI EXORCIZO TE PER ISTA TRIA NOMINA EDXAI EN ONOMATI GRAMMATON IN NOMINE PATRIS ET FILII ET SPIRITVS SANCTI AMEN".

== See also ==
- List of paintings by Albrecht Dürer

== Sources ==
- Costantino Porcu, ed. (2004). Dürer. Milan: Rizzoli.
