= Jakob Heller =

German patrician, politician, and merchant

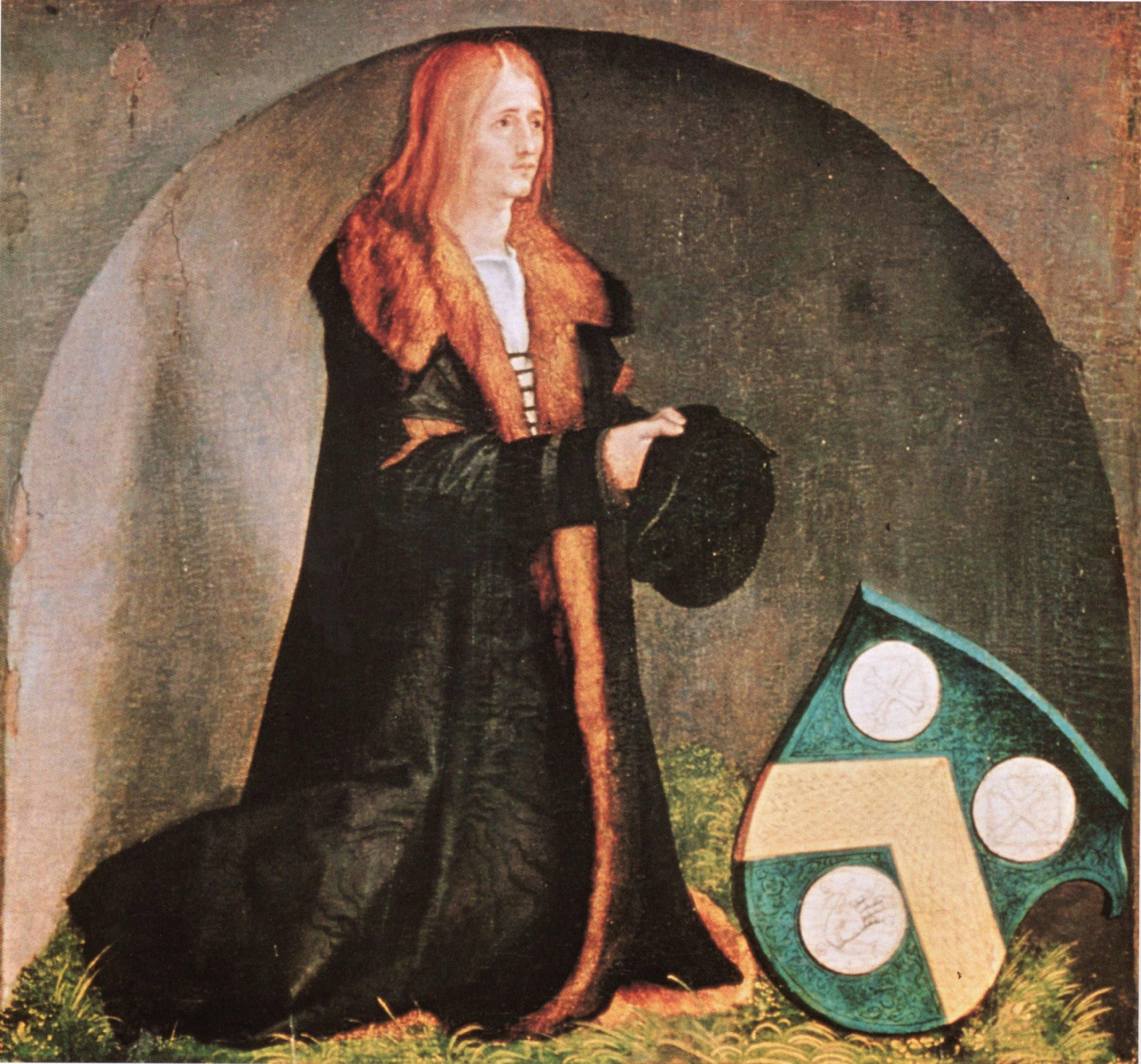
Jakob Heller with his coat of arms, as depicted on the Heller Altarpiece by Albrecht Dürer (c. 1507-09)

Jakob Heller (c. 1460 — 28 January 1522) was a German patrician, politician, and merchant. He was born and died in Frankfurt am Main, and served as Senior Bürgermeister of the Free City of Frankfurt in 1501 and 1513. Heller is best remembered today as a patron of the arts, as he commissioned the Heller Altarpiece from Albrecht Dürer and Matthias Grünewald, and a large sculpture of the crucifixion from Hans Backoffen.
