= Frankfurter Judengasse =

Historical Jewish ghetto in Frankfurt, Germany

Coordinates: 50°6′49″N 8°41′13″E

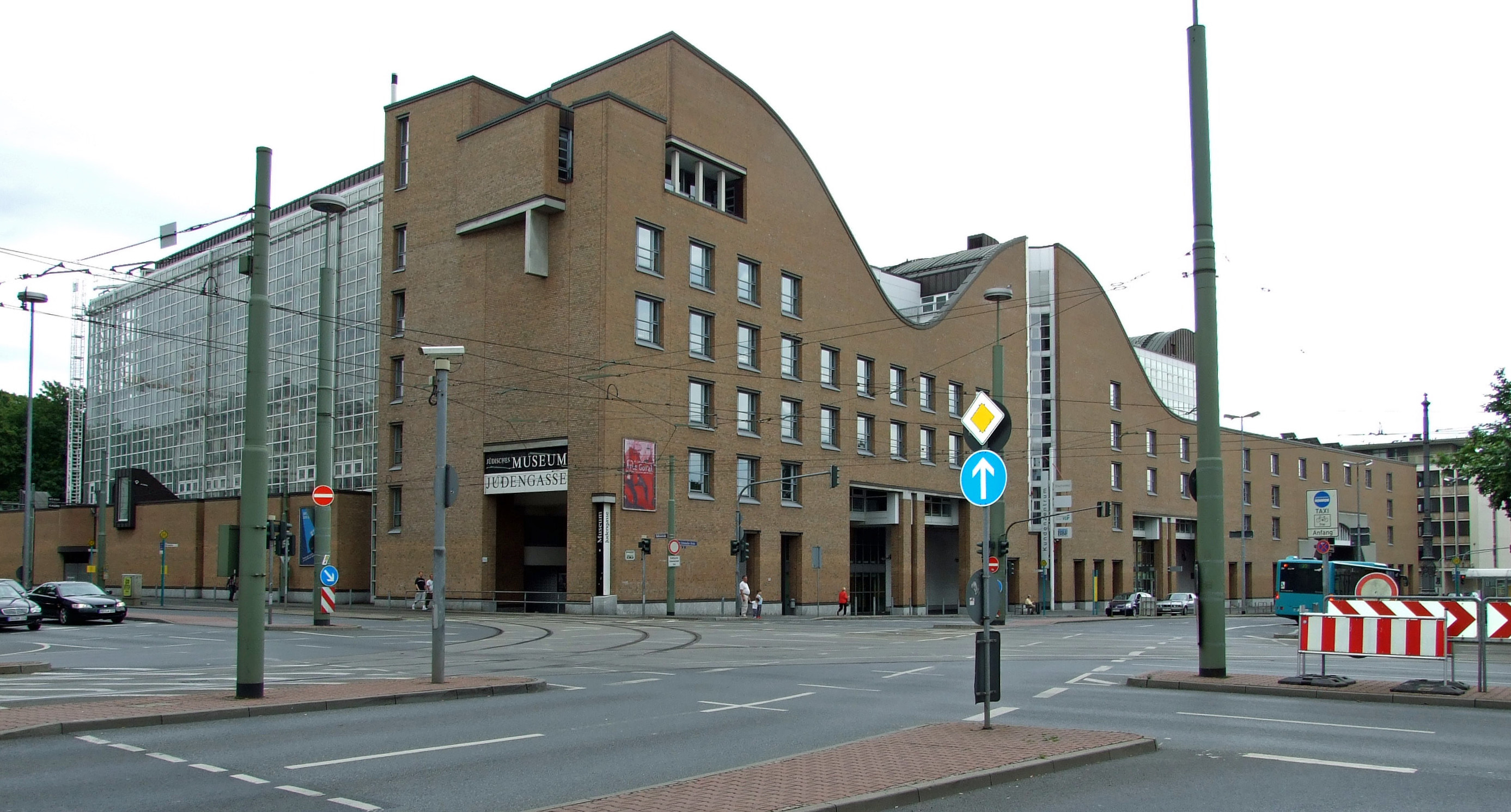
Museum Judengasse

The Frankfurter Judengasse (lit. "Jews' Lane") was the Jewish ghetto of Frankfurt and one of the earliest ghettos in Germany. It existed from 1462 until 1811 and was home to Germany's largest Jewish community in early modern times.

At the end of the 19th century, most of the buildings in the Judengasse were demolished. The area suffered major destruction during World War II and reconstruction left no visible signs of the ghetto in today's townscape of Frankfurt.

Post-war usage of the area included a car park, a petrol station and a wholesale flower market. The decision to build an administrative complex triggered a public discussion as to what should be done with the archaeological remains uncovered during the excavation in 1977. The foundations of 19 buildings were found and five of these can be seen at the "Museum Judengasse" which was incorporated into the new building.

== Location ==
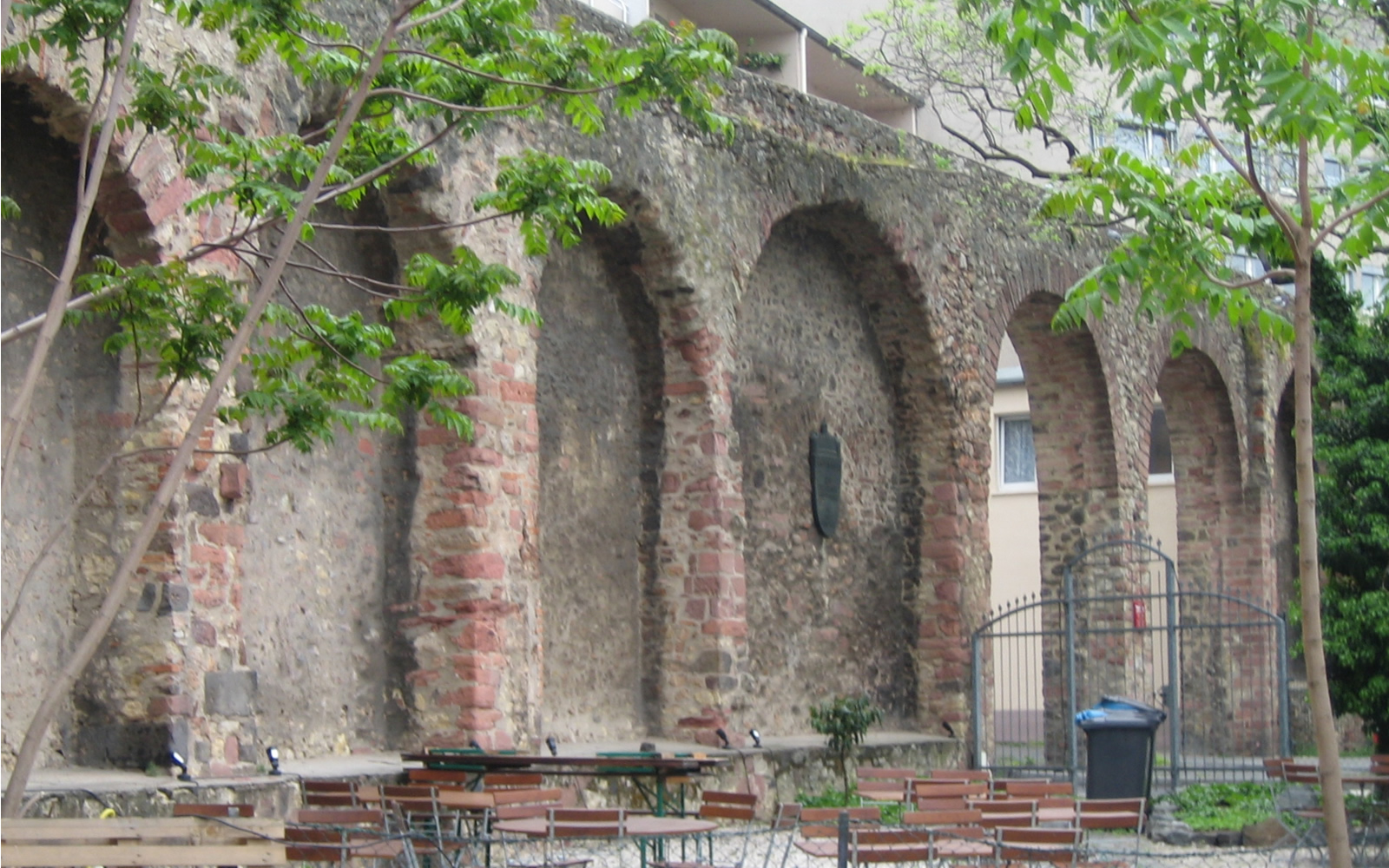
Part of Staufenmauer at Fahrgasse

The ghetto was located outside the city walls east of the medieval city wall (Staufenmauer) and formed a slight curve from today's Konstablerwache to Börneplatz, near the river Main. The street was about 330 meters long, three to four meters wide, and had three town gates. The gates were locked at night as well as on Sundays and Christian holidays. Due to the narrow street and the limited access, the Judengasse was destroyed three times by fire in the 18th century alone, in 1711, 1721 and 1796.

Initially, some 15 families with about 110 members lived in Frankfurt's Judengasse when they were forcibly removed from the city and relocated to the ghetto by decree of Frederick III in 1462. By the 16th century, the number of inhabitants rose to over 3,000, living in 195 houses. The ghetto had one of the highest population densities in Europe. Contemporary documents described it as narrow, oppressive and dirty.

== History before the creation of the ghetto ==
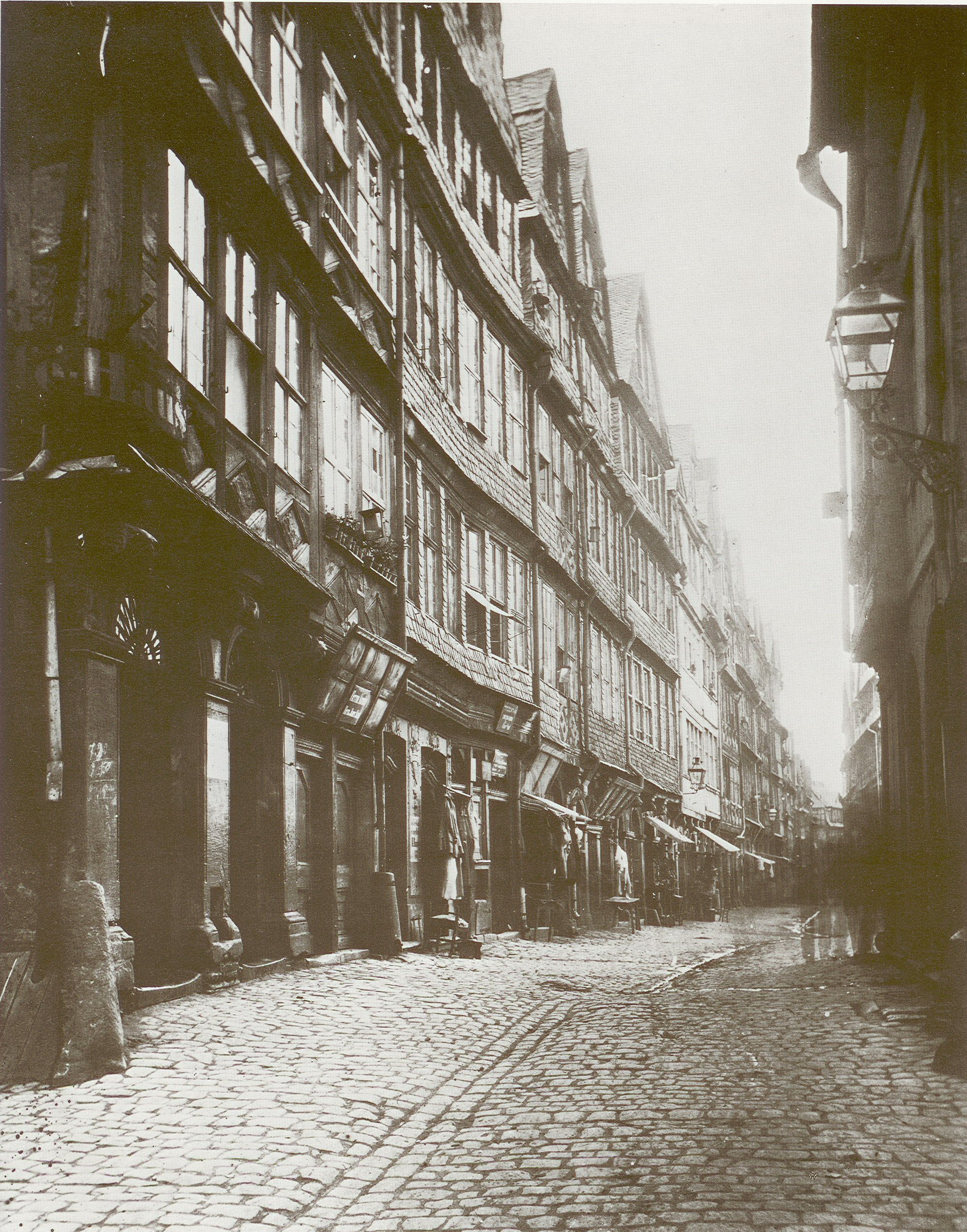
Frankfurter Judengasse in 1868

It is likely that Jews were amongst the earliest inhabitants of Frankfurt. On 18 January 1074, Henry IV granted the citizens and Jews of Worms, Speyer, and Mainz (called the ShUM-cities) and other locations, including Frankfurt, certain privileges relating to reductions in fees and import duties. Eighty years later the Mainz based Rabbi Elieser ben Nathan (who died between 1145 and 1152) mentioned the Jewish community in Frankfurt in his book Eben ha Eser. Most likely the community was still very small at this point.

Until the Late Middle Ages, the Frankfurt Jews lived in the present-day old city, between the Saint Bartholomew's Cathedral, Fahrgasse and the Main River. This prosperous section of the city was also the center of political life in Frankfurt. The town hall, the mint and a mansion of the Archbishop of Mainz were located in this area. During this time the Frankfurt Jews were allowed to travel throughout the city, which was an unusual freedom in the Holy Roman Empire. Additionally, many non-Jews lived in the Jewish section of town.

=== The first Judenschlacht of 1241 ===
In May 1241, a pogrom, known as the Judenschlacht (from the German; Slaughter of the Jews) took place in Frankfurt, brought on by conflicts over Jewish-Christian marriages and the enforced baptism of children of such marriages. The Annales Erphordenses recorded that a few Christians and 180 Jews died during the pogrom. It also records that 24 Jews avoided death by accepting baptism, while under the protection of the city fathers. During the attacks, the synagogue was plundered and the Torah scrolls were destroyed. All of this occurred despite the fact that the Jews had been protected by the Frederick II, Holy Roman Emperor since 1236, and had a royal appointee running much of the city government.

It seems possible that the Judenschlacht was organized rather than spontaneous. One reason presented is that the fighting lasted more than a day. Secondly, a fortified tower where 70 Jews had taken refuge was captured. Finally, a qinah or Jewish dirge records that archers attacked a rabbi and his pupils in their school. All three events imply a measure of planning and the presence of soldiers or a strong militia.

Exactly who may have been responsible for the Judenschlacht is unclear owing to the scarcity of sources. The theory that it was led by the Dominicans, who had a papal order to fight heresy, is questionable. Another theory is that the pogrom was actually an attack against the Hohenstaufen led by Frederick II.

Frederick II ordered an investigation into the Judenschlacht that lasted some years. In 1246 Conrad IV, on behalf of his father Frederick II, issued a document pardoning the citizens of Frankfurt. It declared a pardon without payment on damages because the pogrom occurred, "from carelessness rather than deliberation." The general pardon is an example of the weak political power of the Hohenstaufen in Frankfurt.

=== The second Judenschlacht of 1349 ===
By the 14th century, Frankfurt was granted the status of a Free Imperial City by the Emperor Ludwig the Bavarian and Charles IV. As a Free Imperial City, Frankfurt was only responsible to the Holy Roman Emperor and not to local princes. The city operated as a virtual City-state with limited control from the Emperor. This new wealth and freedom led to the total domination of city government by a few wealthy patricians.

In the mid-14th century, renewed violence was directed against the Frankfurt Jews. Ludwig the Bavarian (Luis IV) arrested some members of the Jewish community for alleged crimes. Reacting to the arrests, many local Jews fled the city. The Frankfurt Jews had paid a special tax to the Emperor for his protection and support. When a large number fled the city, he lost a source of income. To make up for this loss, he confiscated houses of those who had fled and sold them to the city of Frankfurt. Those who returned to the city were allowed by the Emperor to negotiate with the city of Frankfurt to repurchase their belongings.

In June 1349 the Emperor Charles IV transferred the special Jewish tax to the city of Frankfurt for 15,200 pounds. The responsibility for protecting the Jewish population thereby shifted from the Imperial Representative to the town council of Frankfurt. Technically, the Frankfurt Jews were no longer subjects of the Emperor but of the city council. Nevertheless, the Emperors maintained an interest in the Jewish population until the end of the Empire.

The Frankfurt Jews were promised, by the Emperor and his descendants, the right to administer their own homes, cemeteries, synagogues and all the easements. In view of the growing number of pogroms – Jews were held responsible for the Black Plague in 1348 – the Emperor included a statement in the promise that turned out to be fatal. The Emperor stated that Frankfurt would not be held responsible if the Jews were killed as a result of sickness or riots. It also stated that the belongings of the deceased would revert to the city.

Two weeks after the Emperor left the city, on 24 July 1349, all the Jews of Frankfurt were beaten to death or burnt as their houses were set aflame. The exact number of victims is unknown, but is estimated to have been 60. In older historical sources, fanatic flagellants are believed to be responsible for initiating the murders as a response to the plague.

However, modern research questions this. Charles IV appears to have given the city of Frankfurt tacit approval for the pogrom, as mentioned above. Additionally, the plague did not reach Frankfurt until autumn 1349. It appears that some local leaders saw the loss of imperial protection as an opportunity to clear their debts and acquire new property. The church yard of St. Bartholomew's Cathedral, for instance, was expanded into what had been Jewish property.

=== The reestablishment of the Jewish community ===
In 1360 the Emperor again granted the right for a Jewish settlement in Frankfurt. The Emperor claimed the right to taxes raised from the newly resettled population. The right to half the taxes was then sold to the Archbishop of Mainz, who then sold the rights to Frankfurt. An Imperial representative was sent to Frankfurt to collect the taxes and safeguard the rights of the Jews. In 1372 the city purchased the office from the Emperor for 6,000 marks. This put the control of Jewish taxes back to the city.

By the end of the 14th century, the Jewish community had grown large enough to establish a new synagogue, where the Jews participated in services, conducted business, swore judicial oaths, and heard proclamations from the emperor or the town council. Following the service, the rabbi would collect owed taxes and dispense punishments for minor offenses. Recent archeological excavations have revealed a 5.6 square meter (60 sq. ft.) area under the synagogue. This area was deep enough to reach the underground water level and most likely served as a mikvah, or ritual bath.

The largest area of Jewish owned property in the city was the cemetery. The cemetery had been used since about 1270 and is first mentioned in a purchase document from 1300. Until 1333 when Emperor Ludwig the Bavarian expanded the city, the cemetery lay outside the city walls. It bordered on some gardens of Saint Bartholomew's Cathedral and was walled very early in its history. In 1349, during a Succession Crisis for the Holy Roman Emperor, the city of Frankfurt declared for Günther von Schwarzburg against Charles IV. When they expected an attack from Charles, the Jewish Cemetery was fortified with eleven oriel windows. Later, in 1388 during a war between Swabia and the Salzburg Archbishop, the cemetery was again fortified.

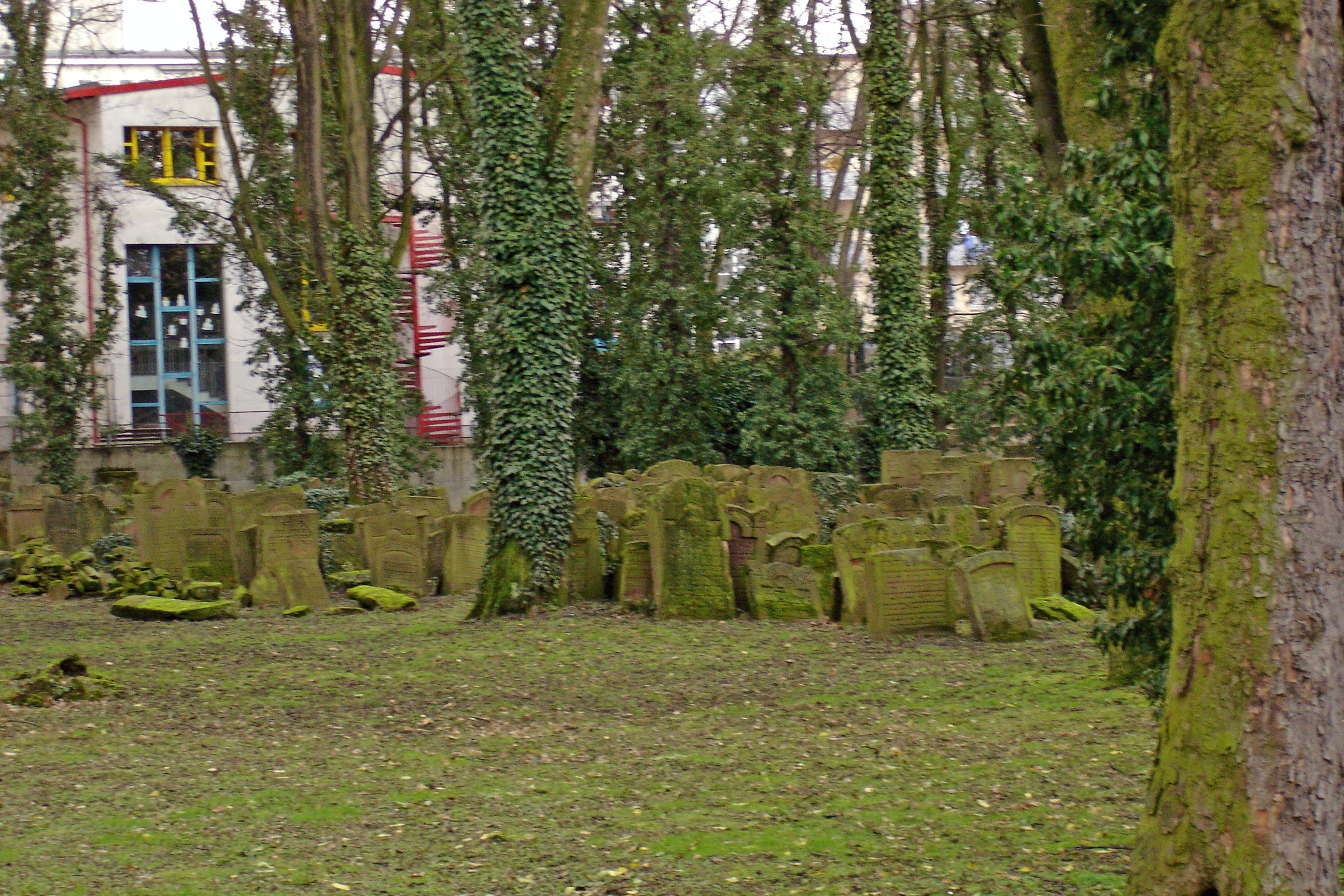
Inside the old cemetery

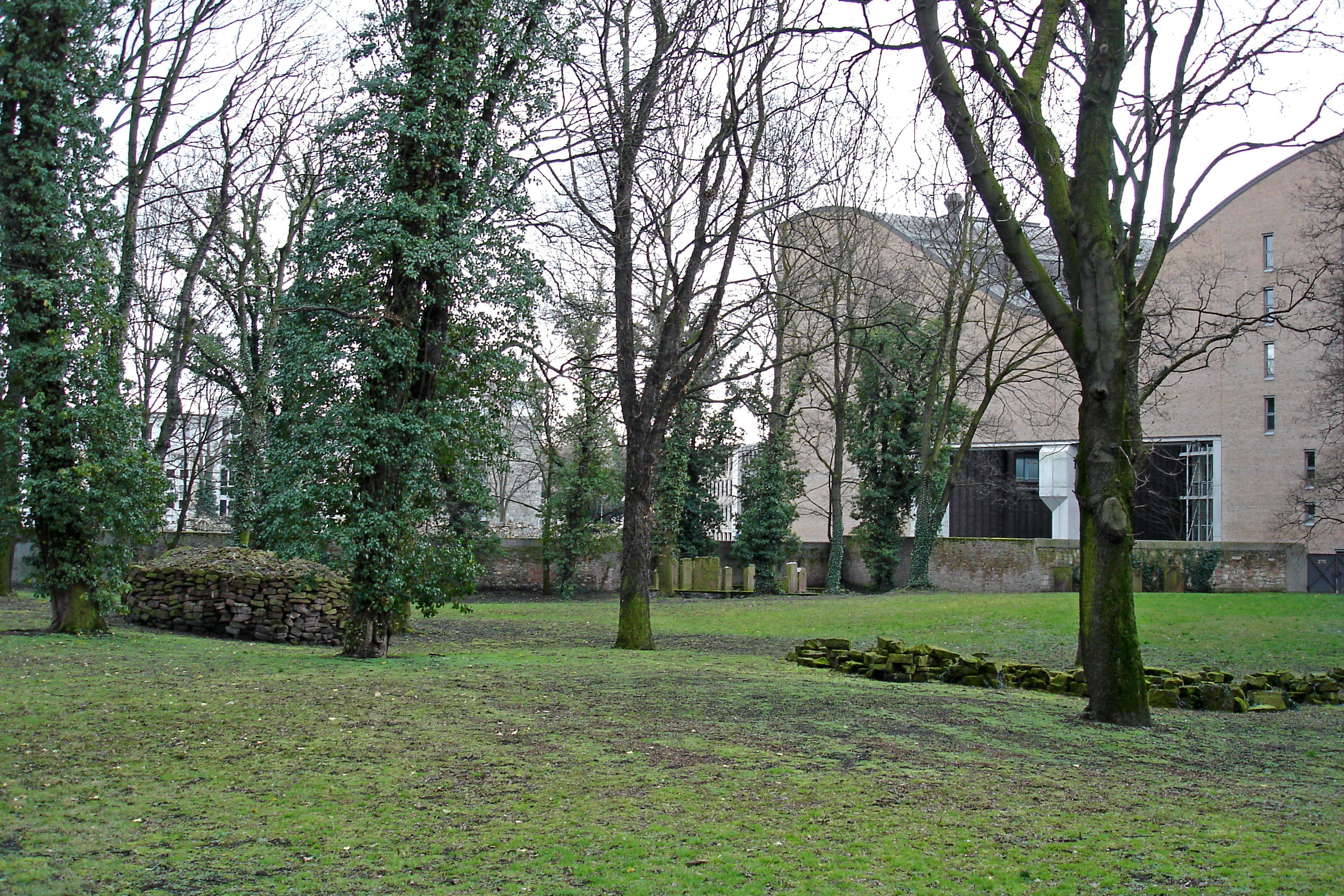
Remains of destroyed memory stones

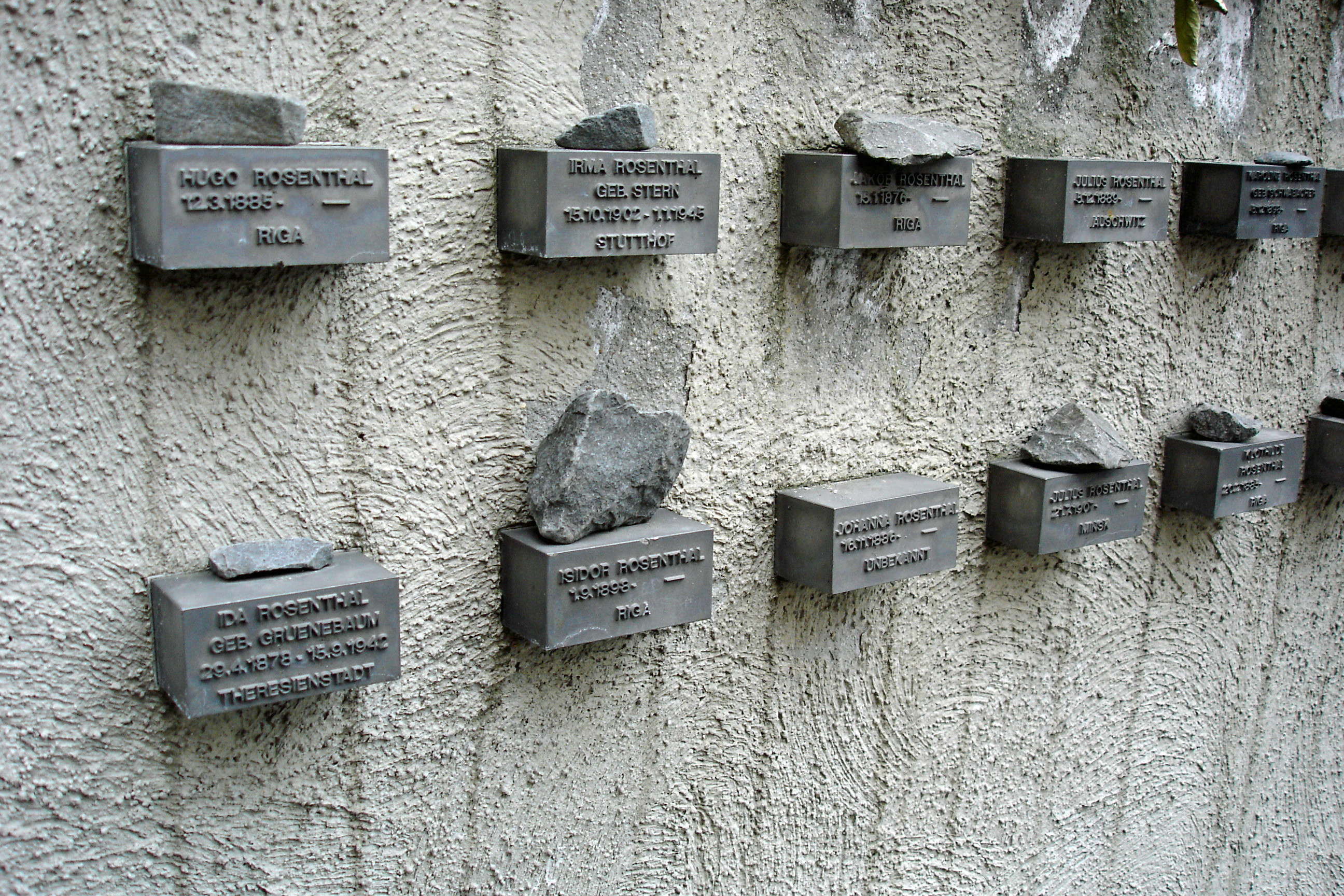
Outside the wall

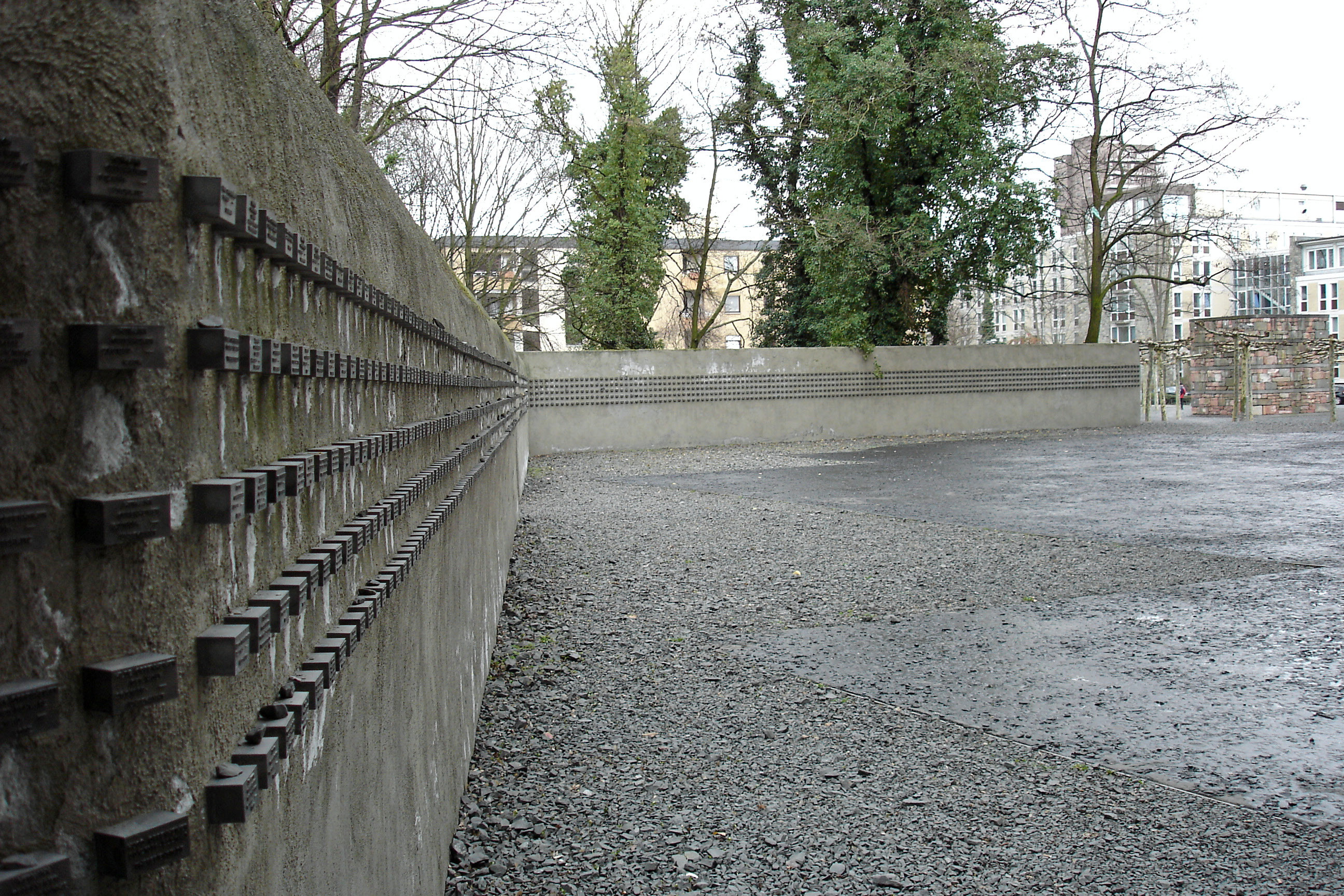
Memory stones for murdered Jews

=== The Jewish Code of Residence (German: Judenstättigkeit) ===
The term Judenstättigkeit refers to the set of special regulations which defined the rights and restrictions applicable to a Jewish resident from the Middle Ages to the 19th century. Before the slaughter of the Jewish community in 1349, Frankfurt's Jews were listed in its municipal Bürgerlisten (German, lit. "Citizens' Lists", lists of people who lived in the city and were granted any rights and privileges due to that city). However, the second community, rebuilt in 1360, had a different and lower status. Each individual had to individually negotiate an agreement with the town council which included how long they would stay in the city, the amount of tribute they would pay and the regulations they must follow. In 1366 Emperor Charles IV instructed his representative Siegfried to prevent Jews from becoming guild masters, from setting their own laws or holding their own courts. In 1424 the town council collected all the individual regulations into der Juden stedikeit (the Jewish regulations). The regulations were read each year in the synagogue.

=== Crisis and growth of the community in the 15th century ===
In the 14th century, Frankfurt lacked a powerful mercantile upper class. Despite the fair, which already existed, trade was less established in Frankfurt than in other German cities. Therefore, many Frankfurt Jews worked as bankers and provided loans to craftsmen, farmers, and nobles from the area surrounding Frankfurt. As a side business, they often bought and sold pawned goods. This led to a small trade in horses, wine, and grain as well as cloth, dresses, and jewelry. Because of the limited market, these enterprises remained small. Based on the amount of tax paid by the Frankfurt Jews, the wealth of the community was inferior to that of the Jewish communities in Nuremberg, Erfurt, Mainz or Regensburg.

At the end of the 14th century, the Frankfurt Jews were subject to increased restrictions. Legislation of 1386 forbade the employment of Christians and restricted the number of Jewish servants in a household. A general cancellation of debts owed to Jewish creditors was issued by Emperor Wenceslaus in 1390, hurting the Jewish money lenders to the benefit of their Christian debtors. (Note: Haverkamp, A. (2018). Germany. In R. Chazan (Ed.), The Cambridge History of Judaism, Volume 6: The Middle Ages: The Christian World, Chapter 9: Germany. Cambridge: Cambridge University Press. Quotation: "To a large extent, these developments resulted from enforced "cancellations" of debts owed to Jews, decreed from the 1370s. These were first ruthlessly practiced, with imprisonment and other means of pressure, by the dukes of Austria. In 1385, a coalition of greed between King Wenceslas and thirty-seven members of the Swabian League of Towns, together with further imperial cities, as well as territories such as the Upper Palatinate, set in motion a much larger scheme. A second confiscation in 1390, again condoned by Wenceslas, proved even worse for the Jews, who were affected in a number of Swiss towns, in Alsace, in the archbishopric of Trier and other parts of the Rhineland down to the Cologne region, but also in Bavaria.") At the same time, the town council used a rigid new tax law to restrict the growth of the community. Between 1412 and 1416, the number of Jewish households dropped from about 27 to about 4. In 1422 the town council rejected the imperial Heretics Tax, claiming that only they had the right to tax the Frankfurt Jews. This action, which the Jewish population had little influence over, caused the entire population to be placed under an Imperial Edict and forced them to flee Frankfurt to avoid punishment. Only in 1424 were they allowed to return after the Emperor acknowledged that the Frankfurt Council was correct in rejecting the Heretics Tax.

The Jewish population reached its lowest point in 1416 and then grew continuously. In the second half of the 15th century, Frankfurt's Jews provided an increasingly substantial tax revenue. Following the expulsion of the Jews from Trier (1418), Vienna (1420), Cologne (1424), Augsburg (1438), Breslau (1453), Magdeburg (1493), Nuremberg (1499), and Regensburg (1519), Frankfurt gained importance as a financial center. One reason for this was that the city council allowed only the most prosperous Jews to settle in the city.

During the 15th century, the guilds, facing competition from the Jewish traders, were able to increase restrictions on the Jews. Nevertheless, when Emperor Maximilian assessed a tax on the Jewish communities to pay for his Italian Campaign in 1497, Frankfurt's contribution was second only to that of the city of Worms.

== The Frankfurt ghetto ==
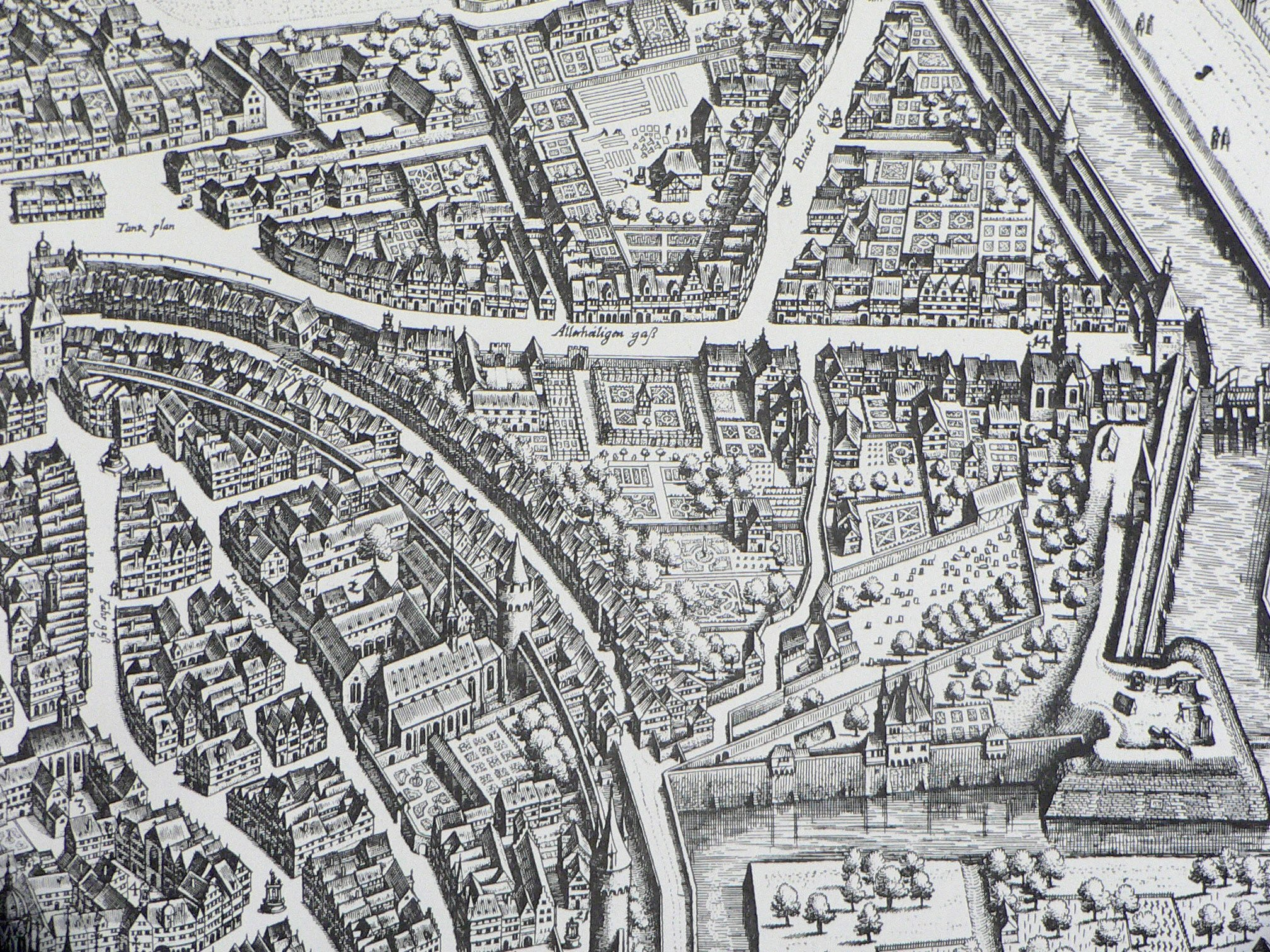
Frankfurt city map 1628, showing the curved Judengasse

=== Leading up to the ghetto ===
By 1431 the town council considered options for dealing with the Jews. Since the town was often in conflict with either the emperor or the Archbishop of Mainz over the Jewish population, this had become a pressing issue. The council debated the creation of a ghetto in both 1432 and 1438 without reaching a conclusion. In 1442 the Emperor Frederick III ordered the resettlement of all Jews living near the cathedral, as the singing in the synagogue was disturbing the Christian services in the cathedral. Then, in 1446 a murder occurred on a Jew known as zum Buchsbaum. The town council secretary recorded this in his book with three crosses, the notation Te Deum laudamus (Latin God be praised) and Crist ist entstanden (German "Christ is risen"). In 1452 Cardinal Nicholas of Cusa visited the city to encourage the town council to enforce the Church Dress Order. That demanded, that female Jews wear a blue veil and all males wear yellow rings on their sleeves. However, adherence to these regulations was enforced only for a short time.

=== Construction of the ghetto ===
After another order from the Emperor Frederick III, in 1458, the council finally began building houses outside the city wall and moat. In 1462 the Jews were forced to relocate into these houses. This was the beginning of the isolated and closed off ghetto. In 1464 the city established eleven houses, one dance hall, two pubs, and a community center at its own expense. The cold bath and synagogue were built by the Jewish community.

This first ghetto synagogue, known as the Altschul (German "old school"), was built on the east side of the Judengasse. As any synagogue, this was used for more than just religious services. It was also the social center of the community where members could carry out many everyday activities. This close connection between religious and everyday life was common in ghetto life. The creation of the ghetto and the corresponding isolation created a sense of self-sufficiency in the Jewish community. Within the synagogue Jewish leaders were selected, regulations from the Rabbis were issued, bankruptcies were declared and corporal punishments were carried out. The seats in the synagogue could be rented by members of the community and were auctioned off if fees were owed.

In 1465 the city council decided that the cost of further construction on the Judengasse would be left to the Jewish community. It was now possible, in 1471, to pave the road, build a second well and a warm bath. The city council maintained the rights to the land and to any houses erected, regardless of who had built them. For any developed plot within the ghetto, the city received a rent from the owner.

Within the next century, the ghetto's population grew until the original houses were no longer sufficient. The Jews were then allowed to expand the ghetto into the city moat. Following the expansions of 1552 and 1579, the Judengasse would remain virtually unchanged until the 19th century.

During the economic growth at the end of the 14th century, the Jewish population increased from 260 in 1543 to about 2,700 in 1613. As the Judengasse could not be enlarged, new houses were created by dividing existing houses. Also, on both sides of the lane, backrows of dwellings were built, so that there were four rows of houses in the ghetto. Finally, additional stories were added to the dwellings and the upper stories were built forward over the lane until they nearly touched each other. On lower houses, large – often multi-story – mansard roofs were added to increase the available room.

=== Life in the ghetto ===
The ghetto remained a very crowded section of town owing to both rapid population growth and the refusal of Frankfurt's municipal authorities to allow the ghetto's area to expand.

Virtually every facet of life was regulated by the council's regulations pertaining to the Jewish community. For example, Jews were not allowed to leave the ghetto during nights, Sundays, Christian holidays or during the election and coronation of the Holy Roman Emperor. In addition to isolating the Jews, these regulations included a number of arbitrary, restrictive and discriminatory rules. The laws regulated the right to live in the city, the collection of deliveries and the acceptable professions. Every Jew was required to wear a circular yellow mark on his or her clothes to identify as a Jew. Furthermore, the influx of Jews into Frankfurt was strictly limited.

Altogether only 500 Jewish families were allowed to live on the Judengasse after a new set of regulations was issued in 1616. The Laws of 1616 also stated that only 12 weddings would be permitted per year in the ghetto. Even wealthy and influential inhabitants, such as the banker Mayer Amschel Rothschild (1744–1812), were not excluded from these Laws.

=== The rabbinical conference of 1603 ===
The Jewish community of Frankfurt was one of the most important in Germany in the 16th century. A Talmudic Academy had been established where the halakhic rabbis taught. Additionally, Kabbalahic works were printed in the ghetto. Whenever the Jewish communities of Germany collected money for the poor Jews in Palestine, the money was sent to Frankfurt for transferral.

The central role of Frankfurt's Jews in Jewish spiritual life is best illustrated in the Rabbinical Conference held in Frankfurt in 1603. Many of the most important Jewish communities in Germany (including Mainz, Fulda, Cologne and Koblenz) sent representatives to Frankfurt for this conference. The conference dealt primarily with topics that the Jews had jurisdiction over, and for which five Courts of Justice existed. Some of these topics were: the fraud in trade and coinage, responsibilities to local authorities, religious questions and ritual regulations. However, the resolutions of the conference were declared treason in Germany. Emperor Rudolf II found that the resolutions of the Conference surpassed the privileges that he had granted. As a result, the Emperor's protection was withdrawn for some 25 years. Rebellions and pogroms resulted in several cities with a significant Jewish population. In 1631 a large fine was paid by the communities to the Archbishop of Cologne to settle the dispute.

=== The Fettmilch uprising ===
Tensions between the patricians and the guilds between 1612 and 1614 led to the Fettmilch uprising in 1614, named after its ringleader, Vincenz Fettmilch. During the riot, the Judengasse was attacked and looted, and the Jews were expelled from the city. Two Jews and one assailant were killed in the pogrom.

The tension was caused by the guilds' demand for greater participation in urban and fiscal policies. The guilds wanted a reduction in grain prices, as well as some anti-Jewish regulations, such as a limitation in the number of Jews and a 50% reduction in the interest rate that Jewish moneylenders could charge. Aside from the guilds, merchants and independent craftsmen also supported Fettmilch in hopes of annulling their debts by restricting the number of moneylenders.

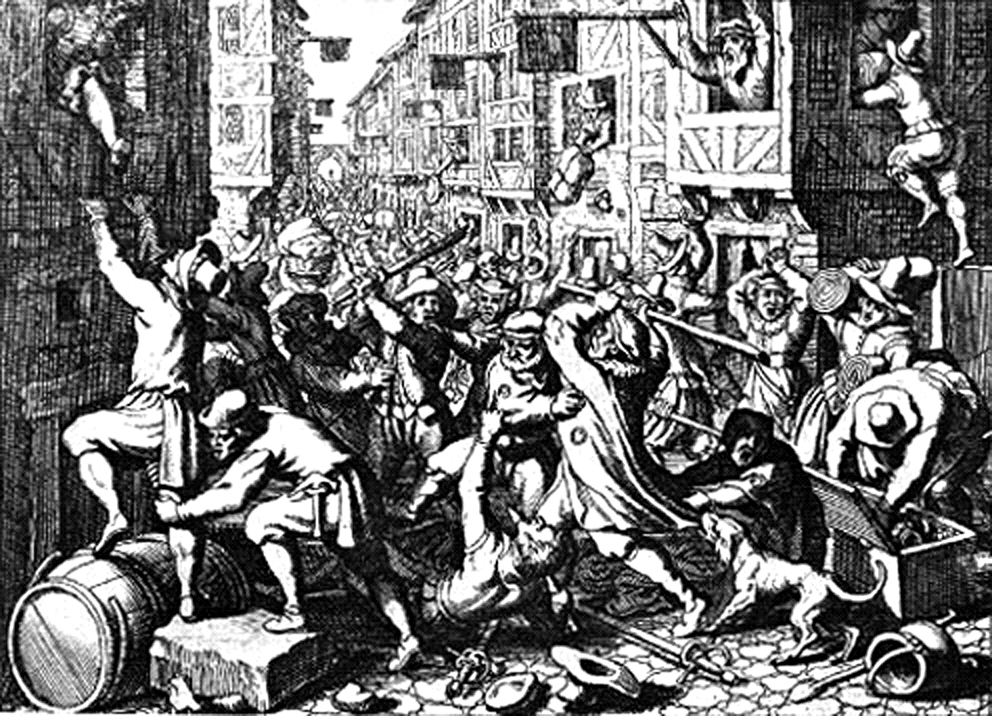
The plundering of the Judengasse, 22 August 1614

In late 1613, the Town Council reached an agreement with Fettmilch and his supporters. This granted the guilds increased power and rights. However, the population of Frankfurt then learned that the city had extensive debts and that the Town Council had misappropriated the Jewish tax collected. Fettmilch declared the Council deposed and seized the city gates. Consequently, Emperor Matthias, who had been neutral, entered the conflict. He demanded a reinstatement of the Town Council and threatened anyone who opposed him with an Imperial Interdiction which would strip the offender of all rights.

Once the rebellious craftsmen learned of the Imperial Interdiction, they took to the streets in protest. The mob directed its anger against the weakest members of the dispute, the Jews. They stormed the gates of the Judengasse which were defended by local Jews. After several hours of fighting at the barricades, the mob entered the ghetto. All inhabitants of the Judengasse, about 1,380 individuals, were driven into the Jewish Cemetery whilst their houses were plundered and partly destroyed. On the following day, the Jews were forced to leave the city. They found refuge in the surrounding communities, particularly Hanau, Höchst and Offenbach.

On 28 September 1614, the Emperor issued a sentence against Fettmilch and his followers. On 27 November, Fettmilch was arrested. He and 38 others were accused of disobedience and rebellion against the Emperor, but charged for their persecution of Jews. On 28 February 1616, Fettmilch and six others were executed on Frankfurt's Rossmarkt square. On the same day, 20 Adar by the Hebrew calendar, the Jews who had fled were led back into Frankfurt by Imperial soldiers. Above the gates to the Judengasse, a stone Imperial Eagle was added with an inscription reading "Protected by the Roman Imperial Majesty and the Holy Empire". The first act of the returning Jews was returning the desecrated synagogue and devastated cemetery to religious use. The anniversary of the return was celebrated as Purim Vinz, after Fettmilch's first name. The Purim-Kaddisch includes a merry march which remembers the joyful return. However, the Jews never received the promised compensation for their losses.

The Fettmilch Rebellion was remarkable as for the first time many Christian commentators had supported the Jewish community in this dispute.

=== The Jewish Code of Residence of 1616 ===
As a reaction to the Fettmilch Rebellion, a new set of regulations was issued in 1616. However, these laws, originating with the Imperial Commissioners from Hessen and the Mainz palatinate (Kurmainz), were based largely on anti-Semitic attitudes and did little to support the rights of the Jewish community.

The regulations determined that no more than 500 Jewish families live in Frankfurt. In the 60 years before the pogrom, the Jewish population had increased tenfold from 43 to 453. The law now put an upper limit on the growth that was allowed in the Jewish community. Jewish marriages were limited to 12 per year, whilst Christians had to prove only that their wealth allowed a marriage.

In business the Jews were broadly granted the same rights that Christian non-citizen residents had. These non-citizen rights, which had evolved during the Middle Ages, excluded them from most types of business. All non-citizens were prevented from opening shops, operating retail business in the city, entering into business ventures with full citizens, or owning business property.

One significant difference was that Jews were explicitly allowed to engage in wholesale businesses, trading commodities, such as grain, wine, cloth, silk, and other textiles. The Emperor may have allowed the Jews the wholesale business to weaken the powerful Christian traders, which had usurped the power the guilds had lost in the Fettmilch Rebellion.

A result of the new laws was that the regulations were not to be renewed every three years and therefore constituted a permanent grant of residency. However, the Jews continued to be treated as an alien group, who had a lower status than citizens and non-citizen residents alike. They remained subjects of the Town Council and, unlike Christians, could not apply for citizenship. The Law of 1616 explicitly forbade the Jews from even calling themselves "citizen". Finally, Jews paid more than other residents in extra tariffs and additional taxes.

The Law of 1616 was revised several times, for example in 1660. Each revision improved the situation of the Jews. However, the Jewish Laws remained a medieval legal construct until the 19th century.

=== The Great Ghetto Fire of 1711 ===
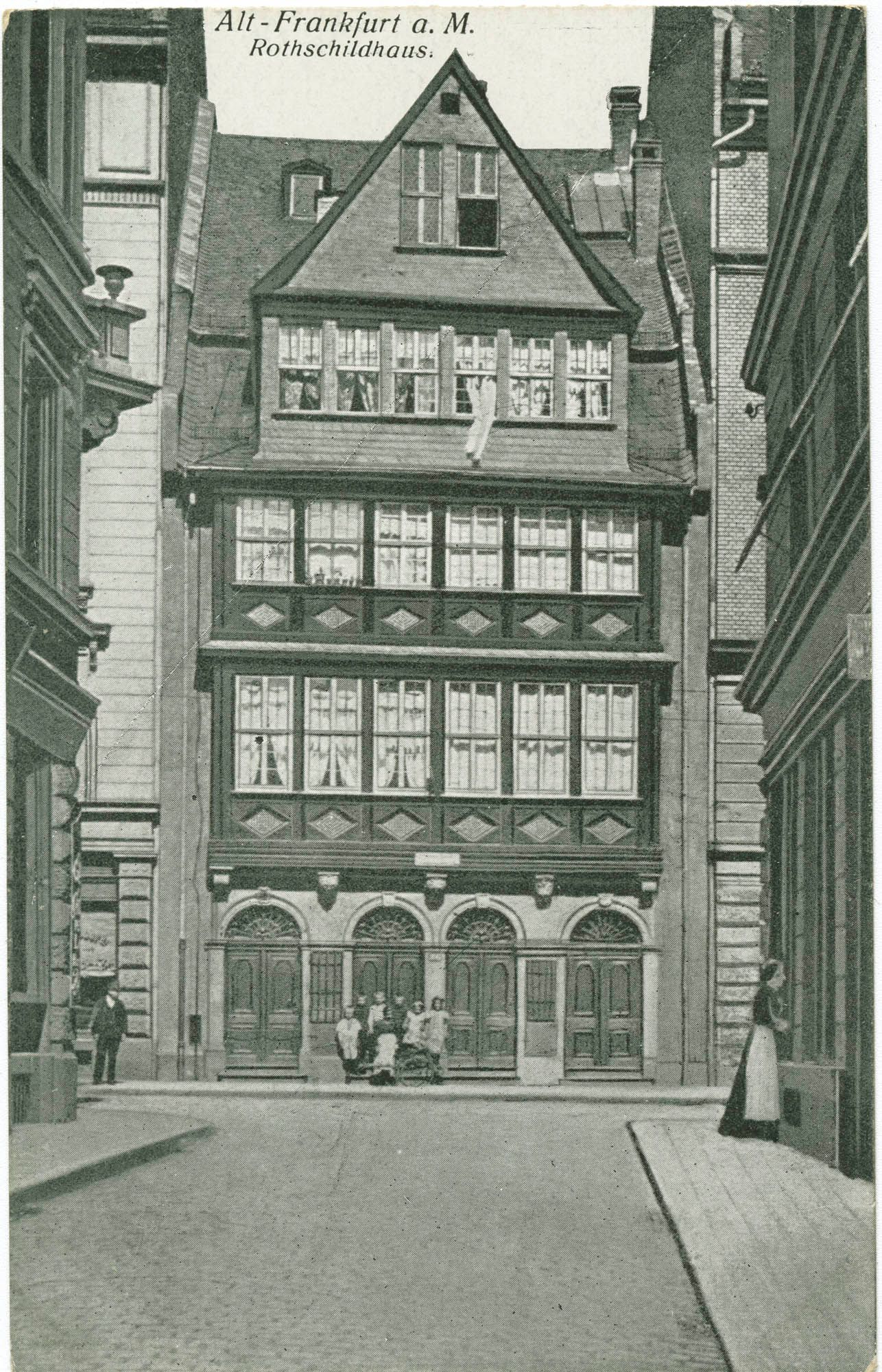
Home of the Rothschild family, a major banking family in the ghetto

On 14 January 1711, one of the largest fires that ever occurred in Frankfurt broke out in the Judengasse. The fire started at about 8 p.m. in the House Eichel (German: Acorn) owned by the senior Rabbi Naphtali Cohen. The house was one of the largest in the ghetto, with a frontage of 9.5 meters (30 ft) and was located directly opposite to the synagogue. Strong winds and the density of the buildings spread the fire. Additionally, the timber-framed construction of houses, the general lack of fire walls and the corbelled upper floors allowed the fire to race through the ghetto.

Out of fear of looting, the gates to the ghetto were locked. The neighboring Christians finally allowed the Jews to flee the burning ghetto when it appeared that the fire would spread if it could not be contained. Even with the additional firefighting help the residents were unable to save the ghetto. Within 24 hours every house had burned to the ground. Fortunately, the wind shifted before the fire could spread further.

Four people lost their lives in the flames, and many valued objects were destroyed, including books, manuscripts and Torah scrolls. After the disaster, the inhabitants of the lane were allowed to rent houses in Christian Frankfurt until their homes were rebuilt. Those who could not afford the rent were forced to search for homes in surrounding Jewish communities. Jews who had lived in the ghetto without permission were expelled. The Jewish community of Frankfurt set the date of the fire (24 Tevet) as a memorial and fast day.

Copper engraving of the Judengasse in Frankfurt am Main after the fire, 1713. In the collection of the Jewish Museum of Switzerland.

The first concern of the Jewish community was the reconstruction of the destroyed synagogue. By the end of September 1711, they had finished the new building. It was constructed on the old foundations and consisted of three parts: the actual synagogue (Altschul), the three-story women's synagogue to the north (which was partly separate from the synagogue) and the Neuschul or new synagogue to the south. The Altschul was built with many Gothic elements, including Gothic arches, an independent façade, columns, and a large rose window. Compared to other synagogues of the Baroque era (Prague, Amsterdam or Poland), this synagogue seemed backward and medieval. The architecture may have reflected the isolation of the ghetto.

The town council required that all reconstruction in the lane follow strict building codes. The builders' drawings, collected and archived by the council, allow an excellent reconstruction of the old Judengasse.

=== The Ghetto Fire of 1721 ===
Only ten years later, a second fire broke out in the ghetto on 28 January 1721. Within eleven hours, the entire northern part of the lane was in flames. Over 100 houses burned down and some houses were looted and damaged by Christian inhabitants. Due to the damage and theft, Emperor Charles VI demanded that the town council punish the looters and better protect the Jewish community. After extensive negotiations, the council decided that repayment would occur but only in the annulment of taxes and fees owed. Reconstruction occurred very slowly because a majority of the community was impoverished by the previous disasters.

Following the fire, a number of inhabitants left the ghetto to live in Frankfurt with Christian landlords. It was not until 1729 that the town council forced the last 45 families living in Frankfurt back into the ghetto.

=== The Bombardment of 1796 ===
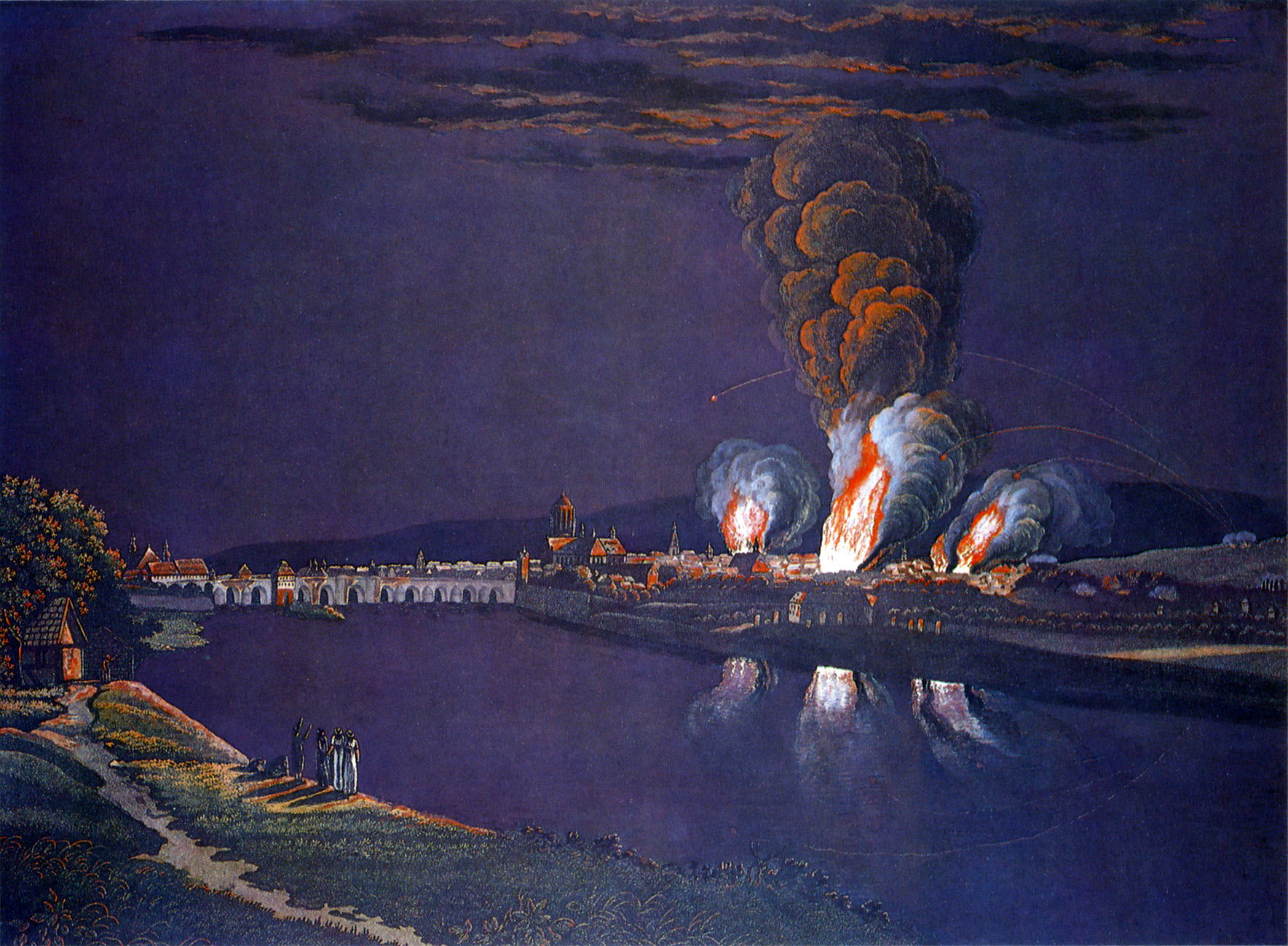
The end of the Judengasse on 13–14 July 1796

In July 1796 French Revolutionary troops under Jean Baptiste Kléber besieged Frankfurt. As the city was garrisoned with Austrian troops, Kléber positioned his troops to attack the garrison. The French army's cannons were positioned north of the city between the Eschenheimer Gate and the All Saints Gate. Kléber hoped to make the Austrian Commander von Wartensleben surrender by bombarding the city in the evening of 12 July and the afternoon of 13 July. A further shelling throughout the night of 13–14 July caused extensive damage. The northern part of the Judengasse was hit and started to burn, destroying about a third of the houses. Following the damage to the entire city, the Austrian garrison was forced to surrender.

Despite the extensive damage from the battle, the destruction had a benefit to the Jewish community. The bombardment led to the de facto abolition of the ghetto.

=== Hep-Hep Riots, 1819 ===
The Hep-Hep riots in Frankfurt began on 8 August 1819, and ended on 12 August with arrival of a military presence.

== The end of the ghetto ==
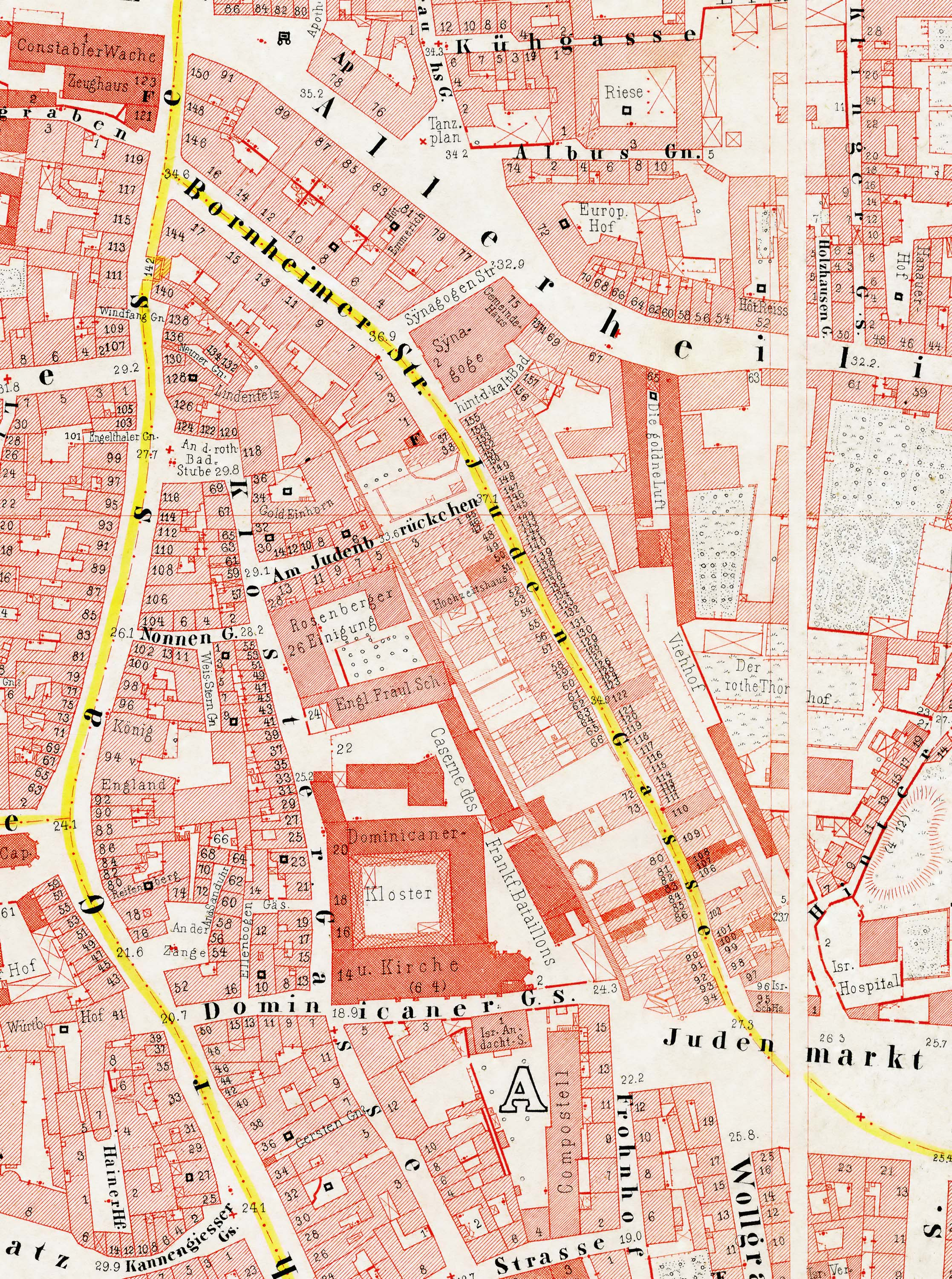
The Judengasse from the Ravenstein produced City Map (1861)

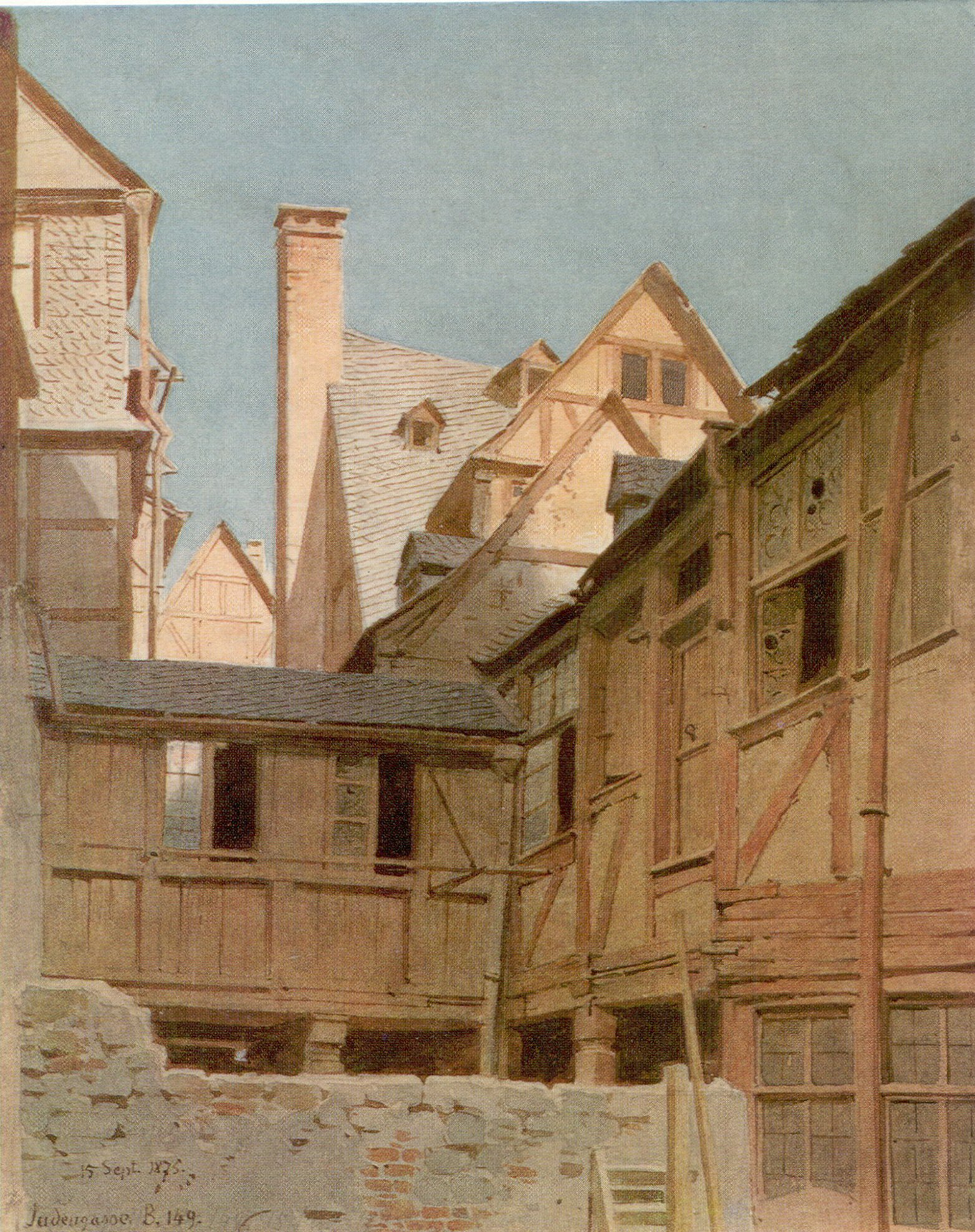
Demolition of the Jewish Ghetto 1875, watercolor by Carl Theodor Reiffenstein

Frankfurt was one of the last cities in Europe to allow the Jews to leave the ghetto. The Frankfurt city council was generally anti-semitic. In 1769 the council responded to a Jewish petition to leave the ghetto on Sunday afternoons as

... an example of the unbounded arrogance of this people, who expend every effort to take all opportunities to set themselves up as equals to the Christian citizens.

In 1779 the drama Nathan the Wise by Gotthold Lessing, a fervent plea for religious tolerance, was published. The Frankfurt town council immediately banned the book and any copies found were confiscated. Frankfurt's Jews intensely lobbied both the Emperor and the German Parliament in Regensburg for an improvement of their status, which had not changed significantly following the Patent of Toleration issued by Emperor Joseph II. However, the lobbying efforts of the Jews were in vain. Only the war between France and the coalition of Austria, England and Kingdom of Prussia brought liberty to the Jews.

In 1806 the French appointed Grand Duke of Frankfurt Karl von Dalberg ordered that equal rights be granted to all religious creeds. One of his first acts was to repeal the old municipal law forbidding the Jews from walking on a main ring road, the Anlagen. When a new school was built for the Jewish community, the Philanthropin, he donated a large sum of money. Despite von Dalberg's efforts, Frankfurt issued a new set of Jewish regulations in 1807 that attempted to reestablish the ghetto. Finally in 1811 Dalberg's Highest Regulation, for the equality of civil right of the Jewish Municipality eliminated the requirements to live in the ghetto and abolished all special Jewish taxes. However, the Jewish community had to pay a lump sum of 440,000 florins.

== The ghetto in the 19th and early 20th centuries ==
The new Main Synagogue, c. 1860

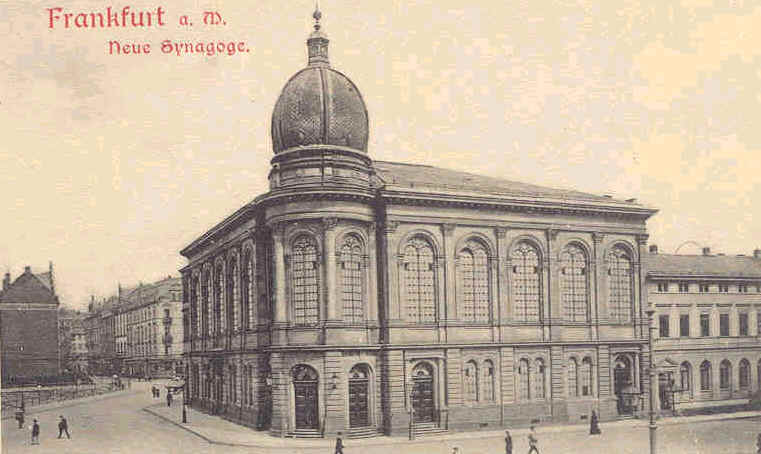
The Börneplatz Synagogue, c. 1890

Following the end of the Confederation of the Rhine and reestablishment of the Free City of Frankfurt in 1816, the Senate agreed upon a series of articles to the Constitution. Acknowledging the desires of the Christian majority, the rights of the Jews were again curtailed. However, the requirement to live in the ghetto was not renewed. In 1864 Frankfurt became the second German city, following the Grand Duchy of Baden (1862), to remove all restrictions on citizens' rights and to grant civic equality to Jews.

Due to the crowded and unsanitary conditions on the Judengasse most Jews had left the former ghetto during the 19th century and settled in the neighboring suburb, "Ostend". After the Jews had moved out of the Judengasse, the poor of Frankfurt moved in. Although the picturesque streetscape attracted tourists and painters, the city wanted to redevelop the urban area. So, in 1874 the desolate buildings on the west side of the street were razed. Then in 1884 nearly all the houses on the east side of the street were also demolished. The few remaining buildings included the Rothschild family home at Number 148, then used as a museum. Mayer Amschel Rothschild's widow, Gutele Rothschild (born Schnaper), lived in this house even after her five sons were elevated to nobility in 1817.

By 1854 the Jewish community had torn down the old synagogue (built in 1711) to build a new synagogue in 1859 to 1860. The new synagogue would become the spiritual center of Reform Judaism in Frankfurt until it was destroyed during the Kristallnacht under the Nazis. Following the reconstruction, Judengasse was renamed after the most famous resident Ludwig Börne as Börnestraße and the old Judenmarkt (German: Jews' Market) was renamed Börneplatz (German: Boerne Platz). The Orthodox Jews lived on Börneplatz and had their own Synagogue, the Börneplatz Synagogue. The Synagogue was built in 1882 and also destroyed in 1938 during the Kristallnacht.

Following the rise to power of the Nazis in 1933 Börnestraße was renamed Großer Wollgraben and Börneplatz became Dominikanerplatz after the Dominican Monastery on the west side. After the Nazis had removed nearly all of Frankfurt's Jews, the former Judengasse was totally destroyed during the bombing of Frankfurt during WWII.

== Remnants of the ghetto ==
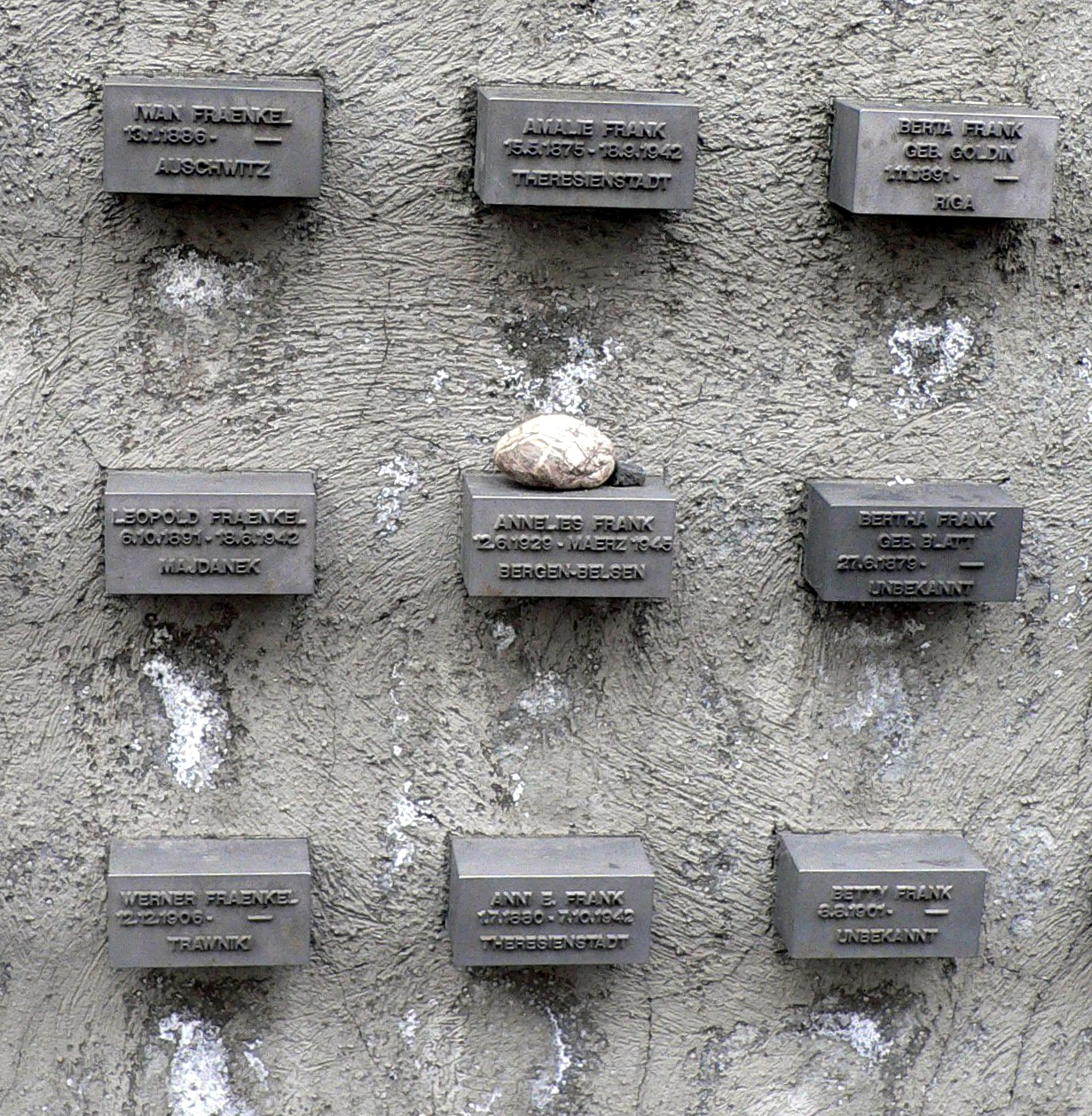
Memorial to the 11,134 Frankfurt citizens killed during the Holocaust – Anne Frank's name is located in the center of the picture with a rock placed on her memorial.

Following the destruction of World War II, the area was completely leveled and built over. From 1952 to 1955 roads were built including the Kurt-Schumacher-Straße (named after Kurt Schumacher) and Berliner Straße. Börneplatz (which would not return to this name until 1978) became the location of the Blumengroßmarkthalle (German: Flower wholesale market) which disappeared in the 1970s. Börne Street was not rebuilt, which makes it nearly impossible to identify the Judengasse.

The northern half of the current road An der Staufenmauer south of the Konstablerwache basically follows the northern end of Börne Street and the former Judengasse. Along this road the last remnants of the old wall that made up the west side of the ghetto can be seen. The wide Kurt Schumacher Street cuts across a section of the former Judengasse at an angle and covers much of the former ghetto. The main synagogue is in Kurt Schumacher Street opposite to the junction of Allerheiligen Street. A memorial plaque on the synagogue indicates the location of Number 41 Judengasse.

The south end of the Judengasse is under the Customer Service Center for the Frankfurt Public Utilities, which was built in 1990. This south end is accessible from the Museum Judengasse.

=== Museum Judengasse ===
In the 1980s, during the construction of the new Administration Building for the city's Public Utilities, portions of the Mikwe (ritual bath) and several foundations of Jewish houses were discovered. This led to a nationwide debate on the future of these remnants of Jewish culture. In 1992, the Museum Judengasse was opened in a carefully preserved basement underneath of the Administration Building. The museum displays the preserved foundations of a section of the ghetto, as well as some artifacts discovered in the construction. The museum is a branch office of the Jewish Museum Frankfurt. Near the museum, on Neuer Börneplatz (German: New Boerne Platz), parts of the outline of the destroyed Börneplatz synagogue have been marked on the pavement.

=== Kristallnacht ===
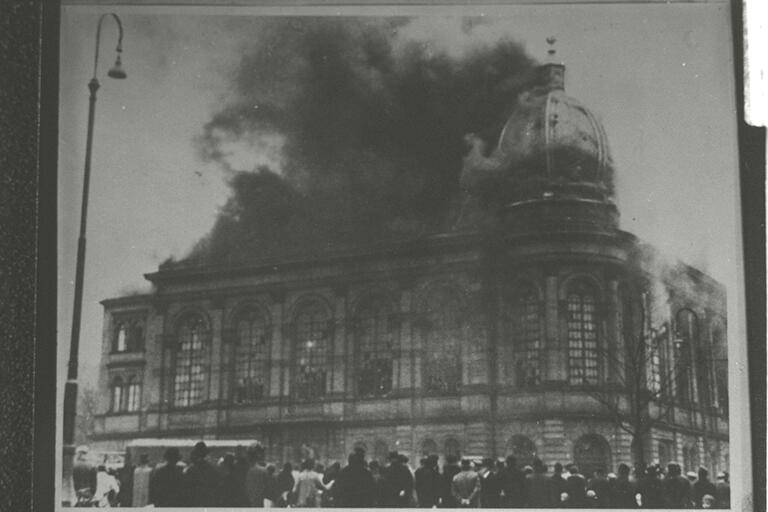
The main synagogue in Frankfurt destroyed on Kristallnacht

Most of the synagogues in Frankfurt were severely damaged or destroyed by the Nazis on Kristallnacht (9–10 November 1938). These included the synagogues at Alt Heddernheim 33, Börneplatz, Börnestraße, Conrad-Weil-Gasse, Freiherr-vom-Stein-Straße, Friedberger Anlage 5–6, Hermesweg 5–7, Inselgasse 9, Marktplatz (Ortsteil Höchst), Obermainanlage 8, Ostendstraße 18, Rechneigrabenstraße 5 (Niederhofheim'sche Synagoge), Schloßstraße 5, and Unterlindau 21.

The deportation of the Jewish residents to their deaths in the East quickened in pace after Kristallnacht. Their property and valuables were taken by the Gestapo before deportation, and they were subjected to extreme violence during transport to the stations for the cattle wagons which carried them east. Most ended up in new ghettoes established by the Nazis such as the Warsaw Ghetto before their murder in camps such as Sobibor, Belzec and Treblinka.

=== Jewish Cemetery on Battonnstraße ===
A further witness to the Jewish ghetto is the large (11,850 m^{2} or 2.93 acres) Jewish Cemetery along the modern Battonnstraße. First mentioned in 1180, the cemetery had served the Jewish community until 1828. The oldest graves date from about 1270, which makes the Frankfurt Jewish Cemetery the second oldest in Germany (after Worms). The best known grave in the cemetery is Mayer Amschel Rothschild's tomb.

From 1828 until 1929 Jews were buried in the Jewish Cemetery, next to the main cemetery on Rat-Beil Straße. Starting in 1929 the new cemetery on Eckenheimer Landstraße was used for interments. Around this time, the old Jewish cemetery was closed and left undisturbed.

At the beginning of the 20th century, there were approximately 7000 headstones in the cemetery. In November 1942, the Nazi mayor Friedrich Krebs ordered the destruction of the cemetery. By the end of the war, about two-thirds of the headstones were destroyed. Today only a small portion of the cemetery is still in the original condition. In 1996 11,134 small tablets were placed in the cemetery, each one engraved with the name of a Jewish citizen from Frankfurt who was murdered during the Holocaust.

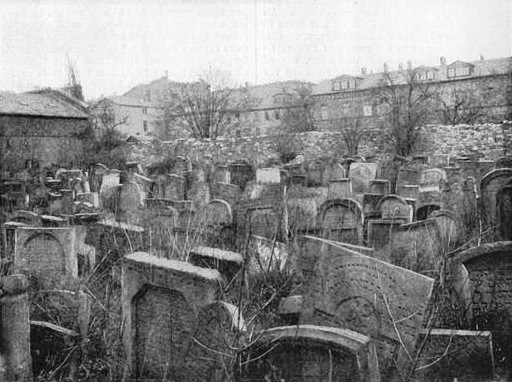
The Jewish Cemetery as depicted in The Jewish Encyclopedia (1901–1906)

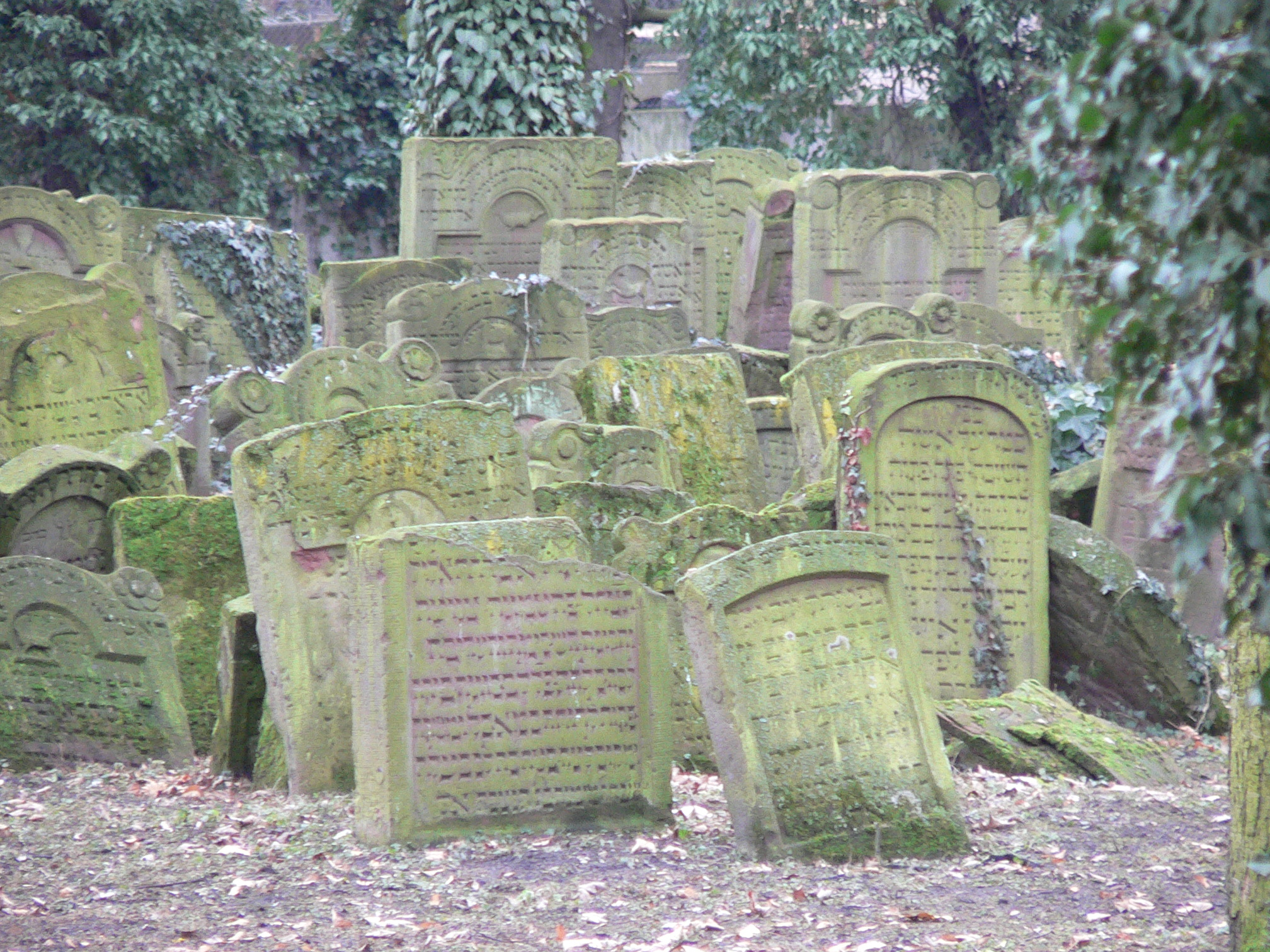
Old Jewish Cemetery on Battonnstraße

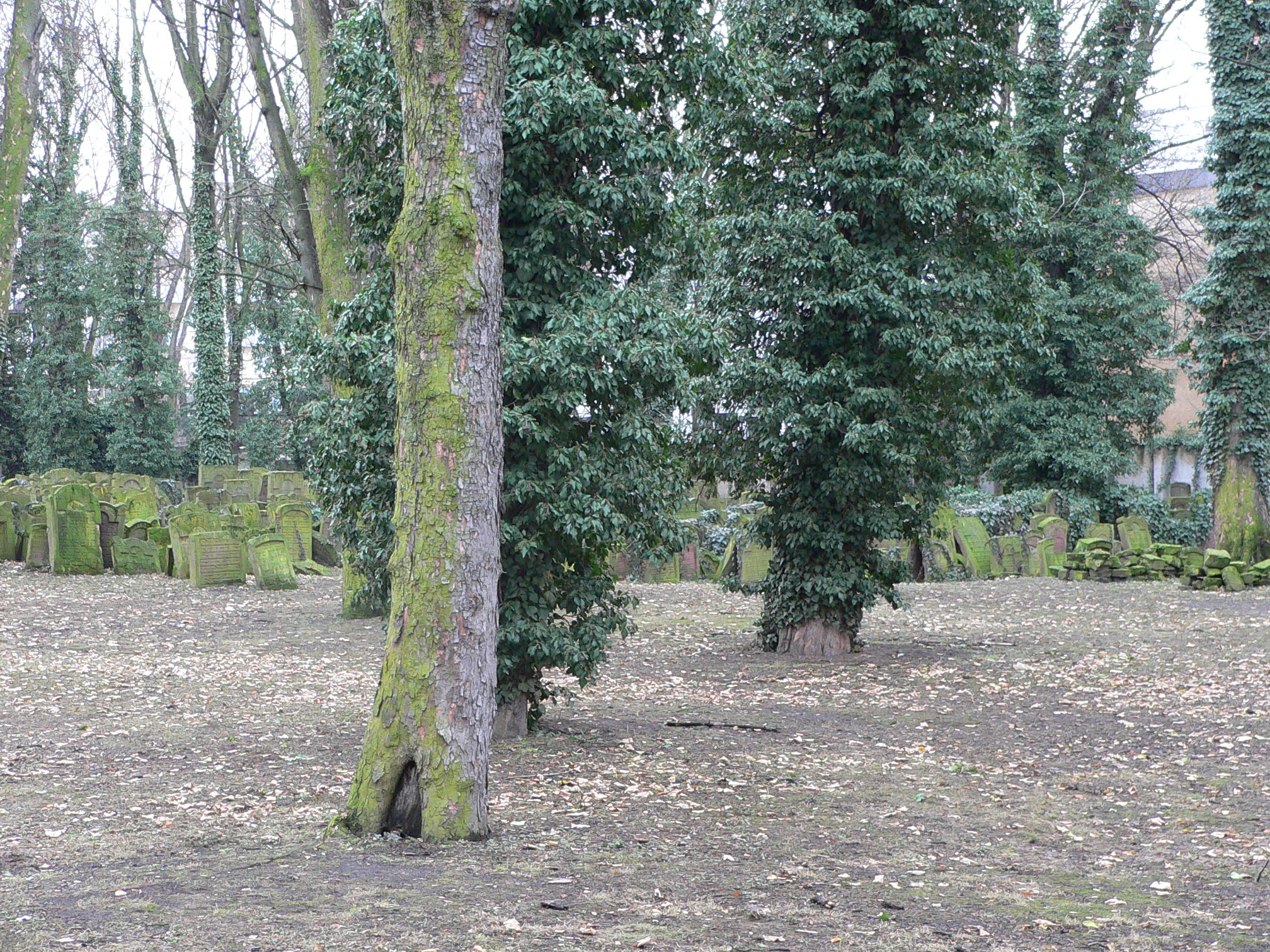
Very few of the headstones are left in the cemetery.

== See also ==
- Memorial Neuer Börneplatz
- Ludwig Börne
