= Predigerkirche, Erfurt =

Predigerkirche
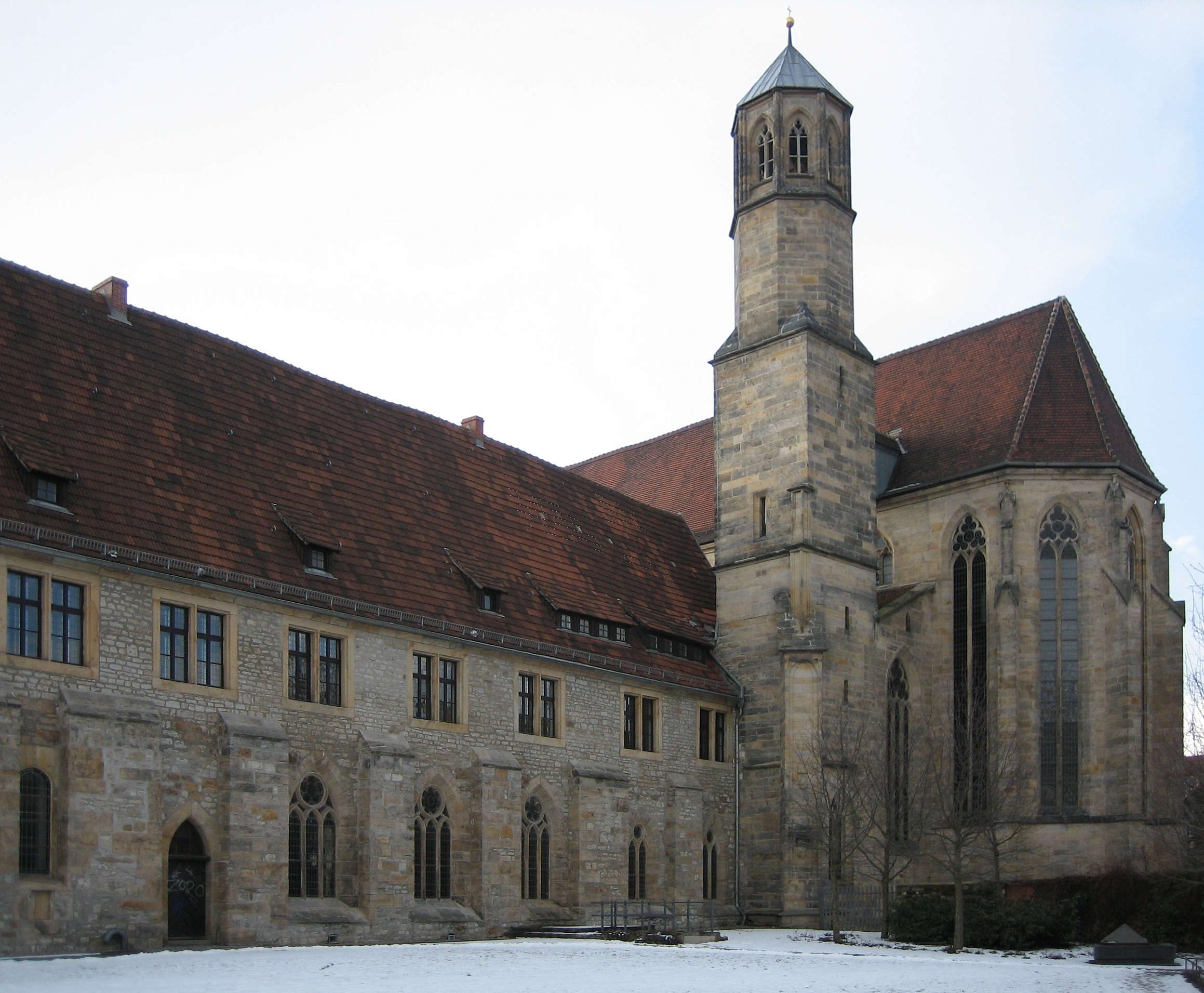
- Erfurt's Predigerkirche, east façade

- Location in Germany
- 50°58′36″N 11°1′45″E
- Location: Erfurt, Thuringia
- Country: Germany
- Denomination: Lutheran
- Previous denomination: Roman Catholic
- Website: predigerkirche.de

History
- Status: Parish church
- Founder: Dominican Order
- Dedication: John the Evangelist

Architecture
- Heritage designation: Kulturdenkmal in Thuringia
- Style: Gothic
- Years built: 14th to 15th century

Specifications
- Length: 76 metres (249 ft)
- Width: 19 metres (62 ft)

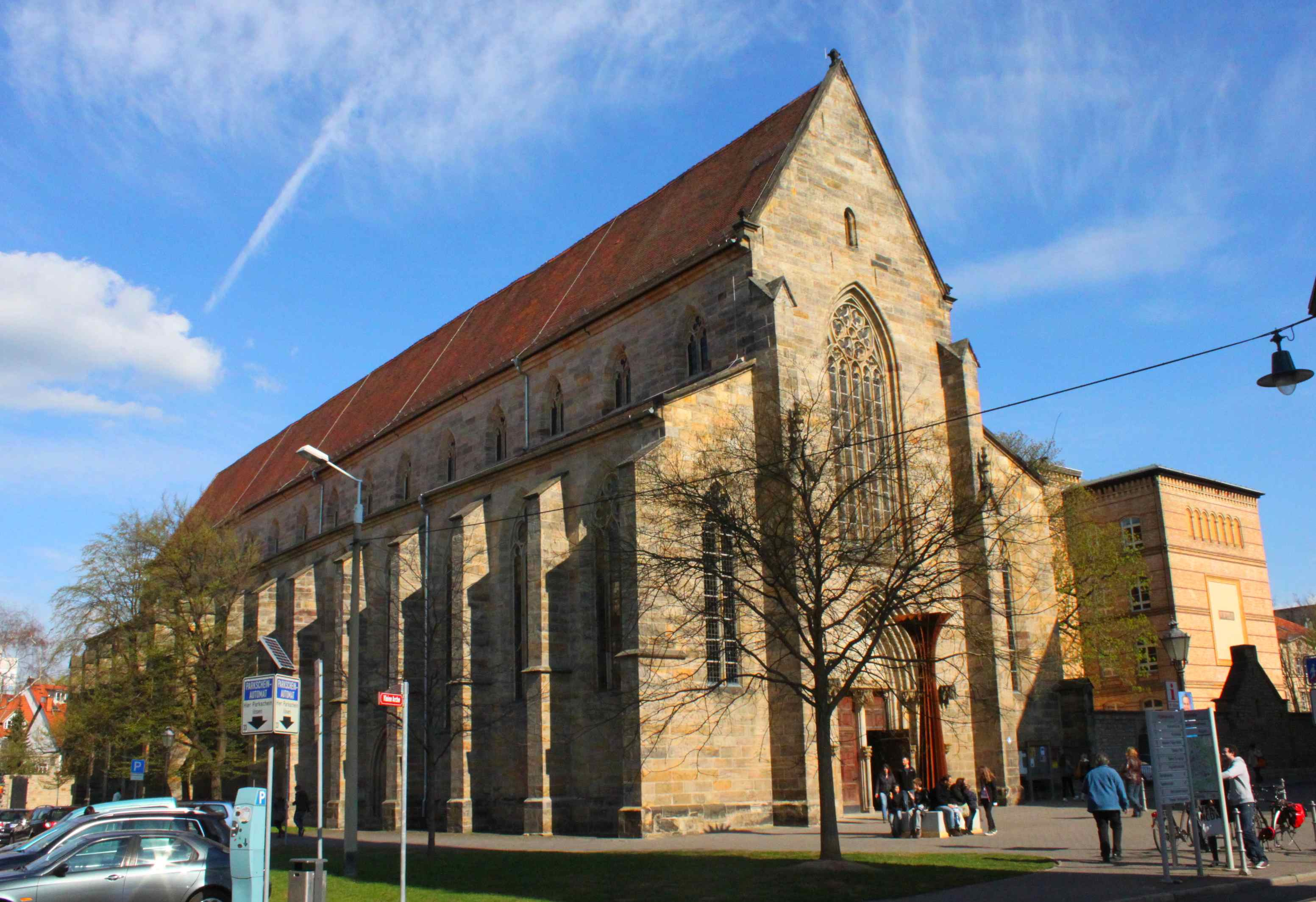
View from northwest

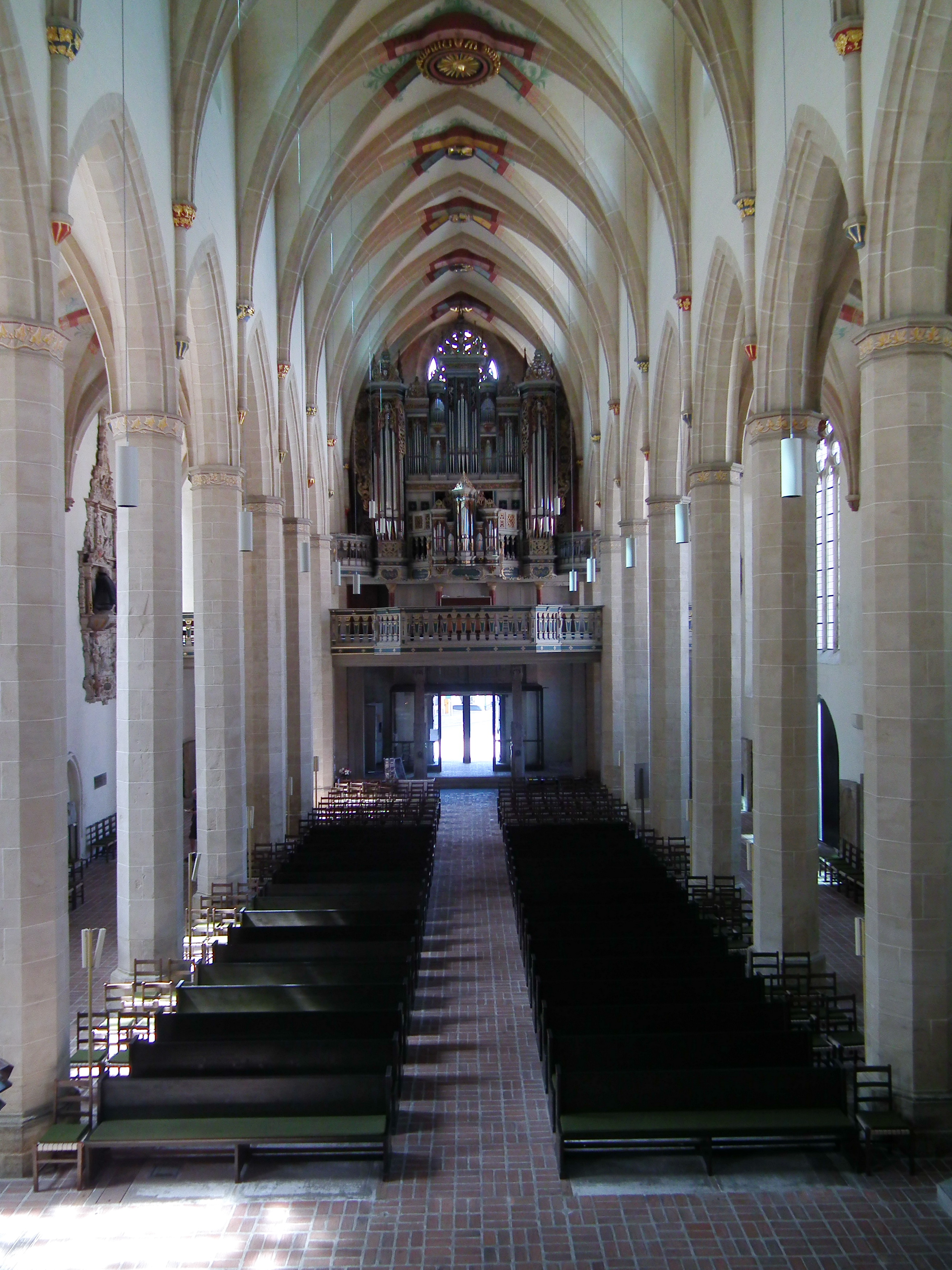
Interior view, looking into the nave

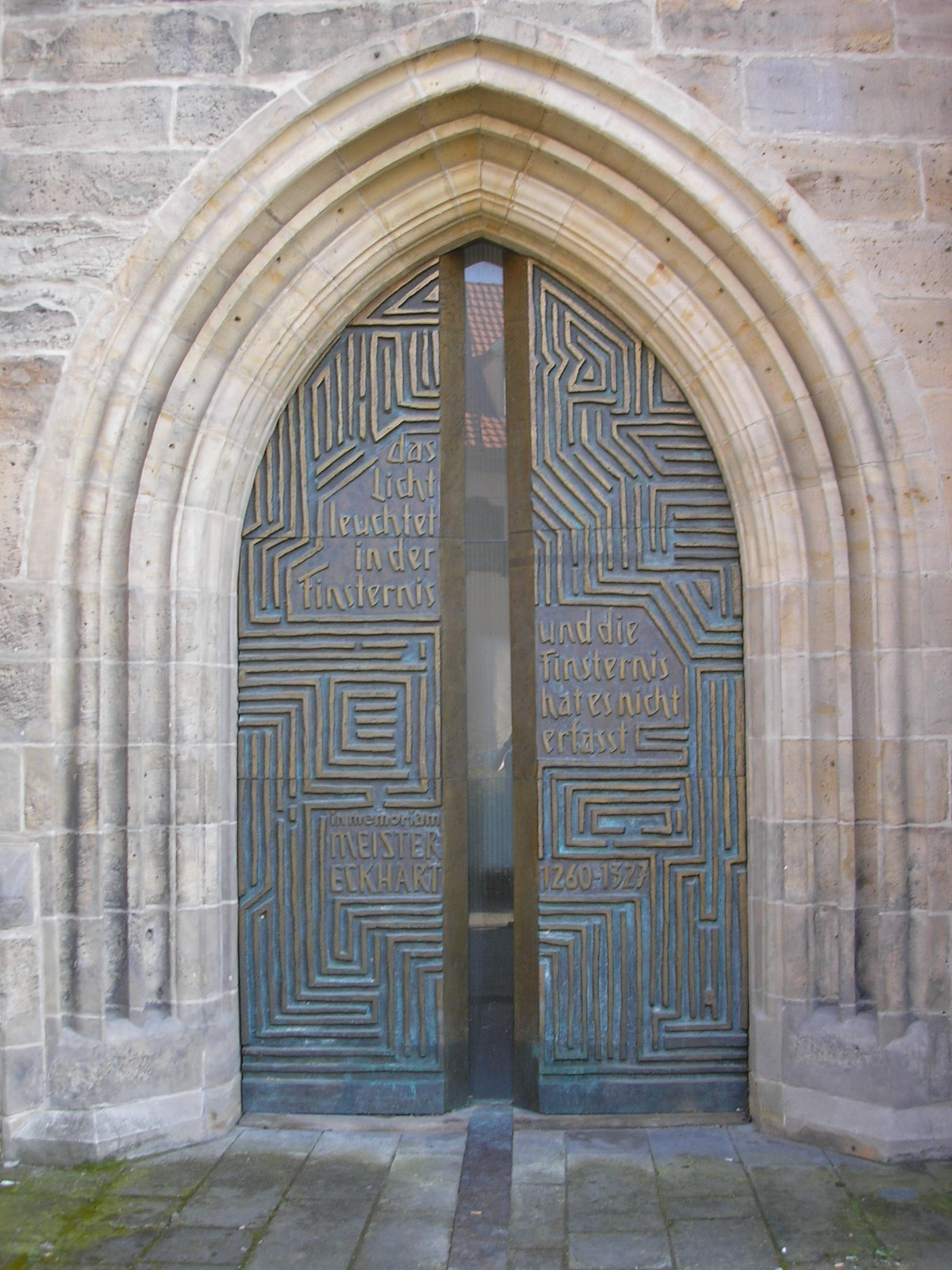
The Meister Eckhart portal

The Predigerkirche (pronounced [ˈpʁeːdiːgɐˌkɪʁçə], "Preachers' Church") is a Lutheran church in Erfurt, central Germany. It is a monastic church to the Dominican friary, Predigerkloster, adjacent to the church. The name of the Preachers' Church derives from the designation of the Dominicans as "Preacher Brothers" (Ordo fratrum Praedicatorum). The Predigerkirche was originally built by the Dominican Order in the 13th century, when the mystic Meister Eckhart was prior here. The original building was modified in 1340–50, and the bell tower was built between 1447 and 1488. The church became Protestant after the Reformation. Around 1806, the Predigerkirche was used as a prisoner-of-war camp, which led to damage to the interior and the equipment. Repairs were made around 1826.

== Location ==
The Predigerkirche is located in what is now the centre of Erfurt's old town on the banks of the Gera river. At the time of its construction in the early 13th century, the building site of the church was owned by the Vitzthum von Rustenberg, an archbishop's administrative official from the Eichsfeld region. The approval for the construction of the church by Archbishop Siegfried II of Mainz was for a plot of land that was close to the already existing Paulskirche in Erfurt.

== History ==
The first record of Dominicans in the city of Erfurt dates from 1229. They were four highly educated friars from the Paris convent who chose the path to Erfurt to spread the new ideas of Dominicus de Guzman and to alleviate the social needs of the city's population. Until the provisional completion of their church, the friars preached in the public squares and churches of the city. The friars possessed rights guaranteed in writing by the Pope, which also allowed them to hear confessions, grant indulgences and bury the deceased – until then the services of the parish clergy, which were provided with income. The Dominicans thus acquired great influence among the city population and the nobility.

The first conventual buildings (Oratorium and Coenobium/Cenobium) were consecrated for the Dominicans by Archbishop Siegfried II of Mainz in 1230. The consecration of a first church by Bishop Engelhard of Naumburg dates from 1238.

Between the 1230s and the 1250s, an anonymous friar at Erfurt composed the Dominican Annals of Erfurt.

The present choir building of the Predigerkirche was roofed over in 1272–73, as can be seen from a dendrochronological dating of the original roof truss that still exists today (which is thus one of the oldest roof truss constructions in Germany).

The church and the friary were the place of work of the most important German mystic, Meister Eckhart, who was probably admitted to the friary as a novice in 1274 at the age of about 14, was later prior of the Erfurt friary and in 1303–1311 provincial with the Erfurt office of the order's province Saxonia.

The original church was demolished in 1340–50 and construction of the nave began in harmonious continuation of the existing choir building (completion of the west façade in 1370–80, vaulting with cross-ribbed vaults by 1445). This elongated "noble Gothic building", uniform in style despite the extremely long construction period, is regarded as the high point of the mendicant style. The rather inconspicuous bell tower was built between 1447 and 1488. A special feature is the (accessible) rood screen from the middle of the 15th century; the old choir screens behind it, i. e. between choir and rood screen and also between choir and side aisles, date from around 1275.

The year 1521 marks a turning point in the history of the church. Magister Georg Forchheim preached the first Protestant sermon to the congregation. The religious and social upheavals subsequently known as the Reformation also led to new parish boundaries in the division of Erfurt's parishes, as not all believers were prepared to follow the new teachings. The fifteen altars in the Predigerkirche, which were certainly also significant in terms of artistic craftsmanship, were parted with in order to suppress the memory of the Catholic imagery and the "Old Doctrine". The council of the city of Erfurt relied on the "New Doctrine", too, and in 1559 designated the Predigerkirche as the council's main church, where all the ceremonies called for at the annual change of councillors were also connected with a solemn service. A wealthy council master paid for the renewal of the painting of the nave and the interior in 1574. The adjoining friary remained in the possession of the Dominican Order until 1588. The friary, which was then sold to the city council, was used as a secular educational institution, but continued the tradition of Erfurt's conventual schools as the forerunners of an urban-civic university.

Apparently, the Erfurt Dominicans had an increased interest in reclaiming their former friary buildings in the early 17th century and tried in vain to press the council for a decision. During the Thirty Years' War (1618–1648), Erfurt and the Cyriaksberg hill were occupied by Union troops of Gustavus Adolphus II of Sweden in 1631. The Swedish king used the church as a court church during his presence in Erfurt. This worsened the situation of the Order's clergy. Due to a lack of funds for building maintenance, parts of the friary complex probably already collapsed, the rest presumably fell victim to the city fire of 1737. The Predigerkirche suffered only minor damage to the tower in this fire, while the majority of the adjacent buildings and neighbouring churches burnt out.

During the Napoleonic Wars in 1806, the church was used by the French as a prisoner-of-war camp and hay store, which led to damage, loss of inventory and devastation of the furnishings with sculptures and paintings. In 1808, regular church services could take place again. In 1811, "by order of the Emperor" Napoleon Bonaparte, whose "domain" was Erfurt, the church was put up for sale for demolition. No buyer came forward. Later, the Prussian architect Karl Friedrich Schinkel campaigned for the building.

Around 1826, the church was repaired, and from 1874 to 1908, the interior and exterior were generally renovated. The stained-glass windows in the high choir were created in Early Gothic style in 1897–1898 by the stained-glass artist Alexander Linnemann from Frankfurt.

In 1850, the Predigerkirche was initially intended as the meeting place of the Erfurt Union Parliament, which, however, then met in the Augustinian Monastery. When the German National Assembly had to evade the bloody revolution in Berlin in January 1919, Erfurt with its Predigerkirche was considered as an alternative, too.

During the National Socialist era, the Predigerkirche's congregation was also the scene of the church struggle. From 1938 to 1945, Gerhard Gloege, a leading member of the Confessing Church (Bekennende Kirche), was pastor at the Predigerkirche.

During the air raids on Erfurt in 1944–45, the church suffered indirect damage with destruction of the windows and extensive roofing. For some time, it was exposed to the weather without protection until the first securing measures began. Between 1946 and 1950, on the initiative of Pastor Benckert, the Erfurt master craftsman Heinz Hajna made four coloured "rubble windows" from shards of windows from German Protestant churches destroyed in the war. A comprehensive reconstruction of the church, which had already been planned before the war, took place from 1960 to 1964 under the direction of the restorer Käthe Menzel-Jordan. During the renovation of the floor, more than 150 large-format sandstone grave slabs from the 14th to 18th centuries were uncovered, 80 of which were still in good condition. These slabs had been laid down in three layers to form the substructure of the floor, which was renovated around 1900. Underneath, several intact burials with partially mummified bodies were revealed. Many of these stones showed signs of multiple use; pictures and writing mostly attest to donors from Erfurt patrician families.

During the Peaceful Revolution of 1989–90, the people of Erfurt also gathered in the Predigerkirche before forming the demonstration marches through the city. In October, a plenum of the "New Forum" was held twice in the church with 1750 and 4000 participants.

After the fall of communism, the preservation of the church's substance and its reconstruction were continued to a greater extent.

== Interior ==
The 76-metre-long (249 ft) building from 1270 onward is divided by two transverse screens: a walkable 15th-century rood screen wall, separating the chancel of the monks from the nave of the general public and a parclose screen (Chorschranke). The wooden choir in two rows is from around 1280. The altar triptych is from around 1492 with scenes of the crucifixion. The church windows were made in 1949 using glass shards after the original windows were destroyed during World War II. A remnant of a fresco of Maria's death can be seen on the southeast side of the choir.

The Gothic winged altar dates from around 1492. Linhart Könbergk from the neighbouring Paul's quarter created the carved altar for St Paul's Church opposite. After the Reformation, it was moved to the Predigerkirche. The central shrine shows a Lamentation of Christ, which was fitted in place of a Coronation of Mary in post-Reformation times, surrounded by the apostles Peter and Paul. The wings show scenes of the birth of Christ, adoration by the Magi from the Orient, the Resurrection of Christ and the outpouring of the Holy Spirit. The Sunday side shows in eight pictures the Last Supper, the Garden of Gethsemane, the Scourging, Mocking, Descent from the Cross, Entombment and Ascension of Christ, and the Assumption of Mary. On the weekday side of the five-part folding altar, there are pictures of the apostles Peter and Paul. A signature of the Erfurt carving master was found on the central shrine during restoration work.

== Building description ==
The structure of the Predigerkirche has a length of 76 metres (249 ft) and a width of about 19 metres (62 ft). The choir is 8.75 metres (28.7 ft) wide (at the high altar). The average wall thickness of the nave is 1 metre (3 ft 3 in). The main entrance of the east–west oriented building is on the west side. At the south-east corner are the tower and the chapter house of the former monastery. Inside the church, 30 octagonal pillars (28 stand free) carry the load of the high nave walls and the cross-ribbed vault. The capitals show variations of very carefully executed, flat leaf sculptures; the respective opposite capitals of the north and south sides show similar forms. The building is constructed without buttresses. The side aisles are half the width of the nave (about 4 metres (13 ft) by 8.2 metres (27 ft)). The 15th-century rood screen stands between the choir and the nave.

== Organs and organists ==
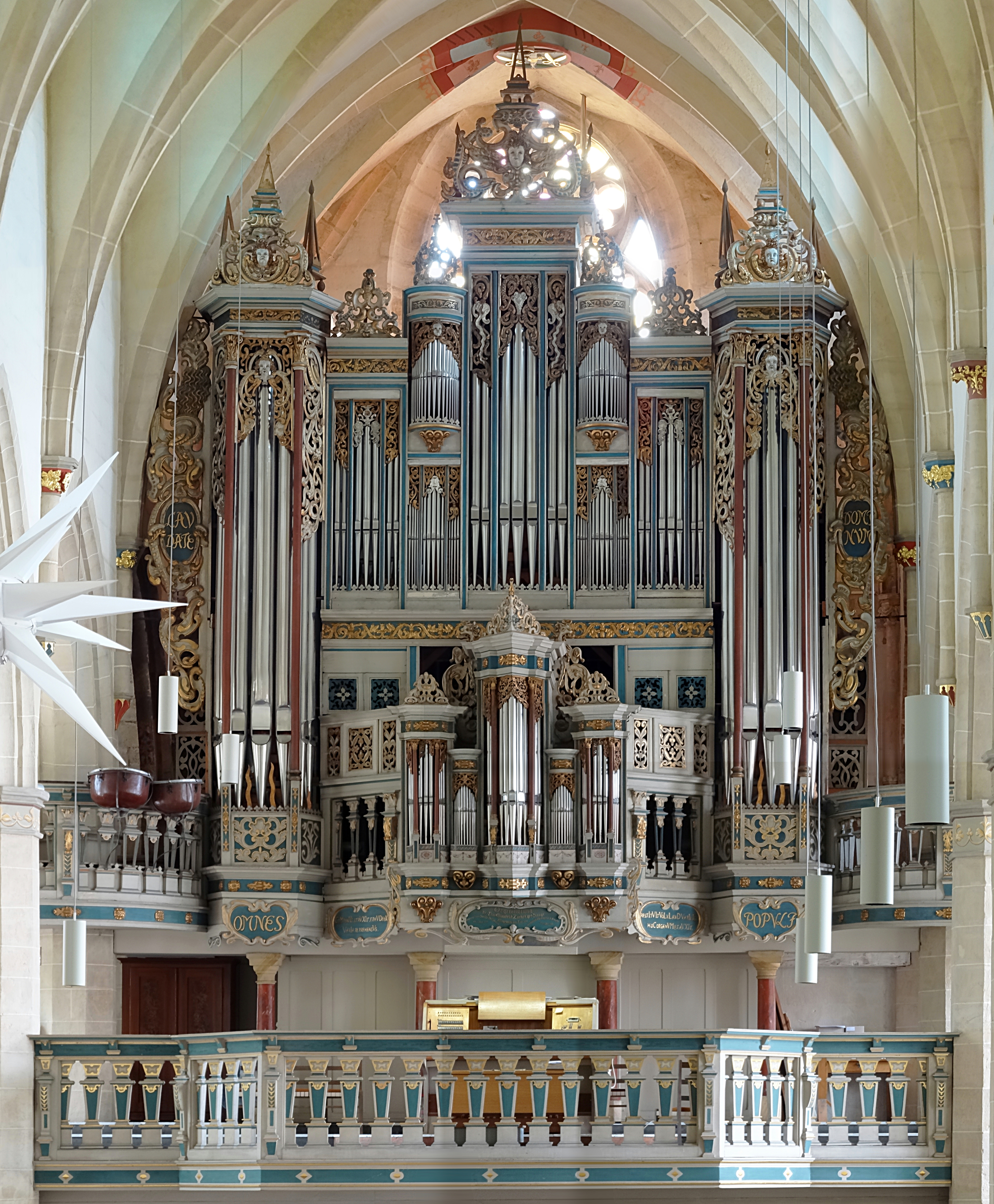
The Schuke organ

The first organ of the Predigerkirche was installed in 1579, built by Heinrich Compenius the Older, on the newly constructed organ gallery. His grandson Ludwig Compenius built a new, Baroque-style organ in 1648; it was the largest and most expensive organ in the city and was played, among others, by Johannes Bach. After several modifications of this Baroque organ, the company E. F. Walcker & Cie. built a new instrument with 60 stops and pneumatic actions in 1898 as their op. 800, which was worn out in the 1950s. In 1977, the company of Alexander Schuke from Potsdam created a new organ behind the Baroque façade from 1648, which had already been commissioned in 1963 and is still used today. The instrument has 56 stops on three manuals and pedal, with 4302 pipes in total. The key actions are mechanical, the stop actions electric. Around 2000, the organ was given a new combination action. Its stop list is as follows:

I Main division C–a^{3}
1.	Principal	16′
2.	Principal	8′
3.	Koppelflöte	8′
4.	Viola di Gamba	8′
5.	Quinte	5 1/3′
6.	Oktave	4′
7.	Gemshorn	4′
8.	Quinte	2 2/3′
9.	Oktave	2′
10.	Groß-Mixtur VI
11.	Klein-Mixtur IV
12.	Trompete	16′
13.	Trompete	8′

II Swell C–a^{3}
14.	Gedackt	16′
15.	Principal	8′
16.	Holzflöte	8′
17.	Spitzgedackt	8′
18.	Salicional	8′
19.	Oktave	4′
20.	Nachthorn	4′
21.	Rohrnassat	2 2/3′
22.	Waldflöte	2′
23.	Terz	1 3/5′
24.	Spitzquinte	1 1/3′
25.	Sifflöte	1′
26.	Oberton II
27.	Mixtur V
28.	Cymbel III
29.	Dulcian	16′
30.	Oboe	8′
	Tremulant

III Positive C–a^{3}
31.	Gedackt	8′
32.	Quintadena	8′
33.	Principal	4′
34.	Rohrflöte	4′
35.	Sesquialtera II	2 2/3′
36.	Oktave	2′
37.	Spitzflöte	2′
38.	Quinte	1 1/3′
39.	Scharff V
40.	Spillregal	16′
41.	Trichterregal	8′
	Tremulant

Pedal C–f^{1}
42.	Principal	16′
43.	Offenbass	16′
44.	Subbass	16′
45.	Quinte	10 2/3′
46.	Oktave	8′
47.	Spitzflöte	8′
48.	Bass-Aliquote IV
49.	Oktave	4′
50.	Pommer	4′
51.	Flachflöte	2′
52.	Mixtur VI
53.	Posaune	16′
54.	Trompete	8′
55.	Dulcian	8′
56.	Clairon	4′

- Couplers: II/I, III/I, I/P, II/P, III/P
- Playing aids: electronic combination action, crescendo pedal, single reed switch-off, crescendo lever for registrant

Organists who worked at the Predigerkirche include the following:

- 1636–1673: Johannes Bach
- 1673–1678: Johann Effler
- 1678–1690: Johann Pachelbel
- 1690–1691: Nicolaus Vetter
- 1691–1727: Johann Heinrich Buttstett
- 1727–1762: Jakob Adlung
- 1762–1809: Johann Christian Kittel
- 1809–1820: Michael Gottard Fischer
- 1994–present: Matthias Dreißig
