= Annales Erphordenses =

Anonymous Latin annals (1220-1253)

The Annales Erphordenses Fratrum Praedicatorum ("Dominican Annals of Erfurt") are anonymous Latin annals covering the years 1220–1253. They were begun some time after the arrival of the Dominicans in Erfurt in 1229. From the 1230s onwards, they are contemporary records. They record important events in local Dominican history, including the construction of the friary in Erfurt (1231) and of the Predigerkirche (1238). They also cover wider Dominican and German history, including the War of the Thuringian Succession and the outbreak of the revolt of Henry (VII). They are also a source for several major anti-Jewish incidents, including a pogrom at Fulda (1235), the disputation of Paris (1240) and the burning of the Talmuds in France (1242). They are the most important source for the Frankfurt Judenschlacht of 1241.

The Annales share material with the Cronica sancti Petri Erfordensis moderna. It has been hypothesized that they share a common source.

The only manuscript of the Annales was lost in a fire in 1792. It survives through the printed edition of 1723 by Johann Friedrich Schannat.
