= Altstadt (Frankfurt am Main) =

- Quarter of Frankfurt am Main
- Coat of arms

- Location of the Altstadt (red) and the Ortsbezirk Innenstadt I (light red) within Frankfurt am Main
- Interactive map of Altstadt
- Location within Germany Location within Hesse
- Coordinates: 50°06′49″N 08°41′04″E
- Country: Germany
- State: Hesse
- Admin. region: Darmstadt
- District: Urban district
- City: Frankfurt am Main

Area
  - Total: 0.477 km^{2} (0.184 sq mi)

Population (2020-12-31)
  - Total: 4,255
  - Density: 8,920/km^{2} (23,100/sq mi)
- Time zone: UTC+01:00 (CET)
  - Summer (DST): UTC+02:00 (CEST)
- Postal codes: 60311
- Dialling codes: 069
- Vehicle registration: F
- Website: www.frankfurt.de

The Altstadt (German pronunciation: [ˈaltˌʃtat], lit. 'old town') is a quarter (Stadtteil) of Frankfurt am Main, Germany. It is part of the Ortsbezirk Innenstadt I and is located on the northern Main river bank. It is completely surrounded by the Innenstadt district, Frankfurt's present-day city centre. On the opposite side of the Main is the district of Sachsenhausen.

The historic old town of Frankfurt was one of the largest half-timbered towns in Germany until the extensive destruction in World War II with its around 1250 half-timbered houses, most of which date from the Middle Ages. It was one of the most important tourist attractions for Germany. The historic old town was largely destroyed by the air raids on Frankfurt am Main in 1944. The streets and the entire district are predominantly characterized by quickly and easily erected buildings from the 1950s and 60s. A handful of the most important historic buildings, churches and squares were restored or reconstructed, especially around the main square, the Römerberg.

However, from 2012 to 2018, a small section of the old town was reconstructed. A construction project known as the Dom-Römer project, restored a small section of the old town between the Imperial Cathedral and the Römer town hall, following a decision by the city council in 2007. A few former streets and squares that once stood in the area were rebuilt, most notably the historical coronation route of German emperors through the old town from the cathedral.

== General information ==
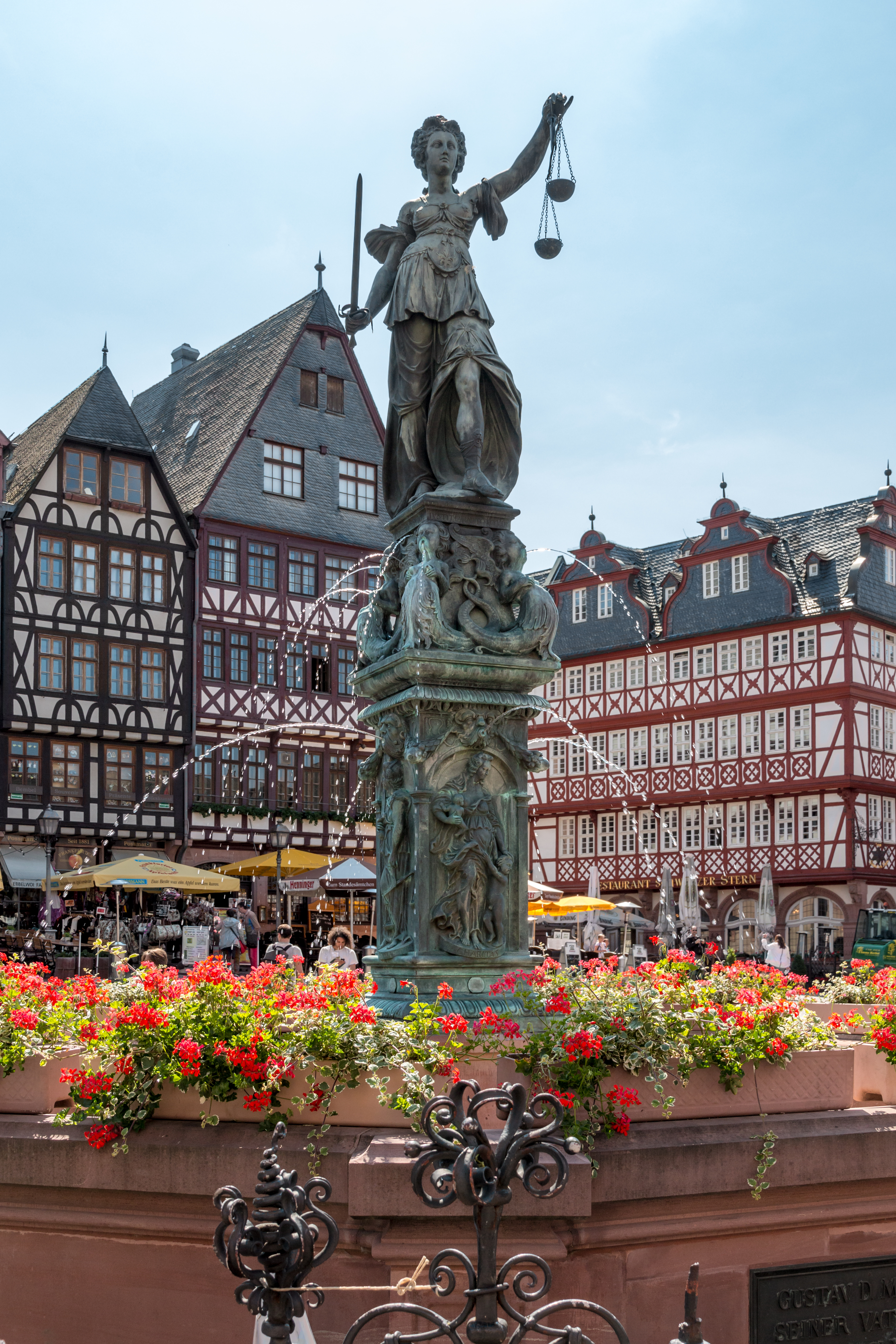
Justice Fountain on the main square in Frankfurt's Altstadt (old town)

=== Surface and population ===
The Altstadt is the smallest district of Frankfurt, covering less than half a square kilometre. The area is completely built-up with the only open spaces being accounted for by the Main and the river bank, the streets, squares and backyards. The construction descends predominantly from the reconstruction phase of the post-war era, aside from which there are numerous historical buildings partly reconstructed after their destruction in the Second World War.

Approximately 3,400 people reside in the Altstadt of which an estimated 32% are of foreign origin. This is above the ratio of the entire town, but far under that of the other town quarters. The adjacent Neustadt, for example, is home to 44% non-German inhabitants.

Museums and theatres dominate the western part of Altstadt and service jobs are a major part of the economy, especially along Weißfrauenstraße and Berliner Straße. The centre of Altstadt is a hot spot for the city's tourism industry, with tours around the most meaningful sights such as Paulskirche, Römer, and the Frankfurt Cathedral, as well as being the seat of the city's administrative branch. In the north of the district the retail industry is well represented, particularly in Neue Kräme and Töngesgasse. Residential flats are found in the east in an area which also contains most of Frankfurt's art trade (Braubachstraße and Fahrgasse).

=== Economy ===
By far the largest employer in the old part of the city is the city's administration. Even today the Altstadt is the political centre of the city. The city council, magistrates and a considerable part of the city departments are located in Römer square, either in the town hall itself or in the surrounding properties.

In the past years, two other important facilities abandoned the Altstadt and the city as a whole: the German Federal Court of Auditors of Berliner Straße which was relocated to Bonn, and the headquarters of Degussa from Weißfrauenstraße which moved to Düsseldorf. While the monument-listed building of the German Federal Court of Auditors is currently being redeveloped, the former Degussa building had been torn down, and the area has been redeveloped into flats and offices.

Other important factors of the economy are the retail and tourist industries. Although there were still numerous small industrial businesses in the narrow lanes up until the Second World War, the retail sector now outweighs all other types of business. Particularly in Neue Kräme and Töngesgasse many niche eateries can be found. In Berliner Straße there a numerous shops specialised on Asian tourists who come to the city for extensive shopping trips. The Fahrgasse and the quarter around the Weckmarkt at the cathedral form the traditional centre for antique dealers in Frankfurt.

=== Traffic ===
The Altstadt is remarkably open because of its attachment to the suburban traffic network. The underground station "Dom/Römer", opened in 1974, connected the historical core of the city to the Underground lines 4 and 5. The building of the track and the station in the years 1968–74 represented a special technical challenge. The underground junction of Willy-Brandt-Platz connects parts of the Altstadt, the rapid-transit system of Hauptwache and Konstablerwache to the north.

Tram lines 11 and 12 operate along the central thoroughfare of Bethmannstrasse-Braubachstrasse-Battonnstrasse. At the start of the 20th century, two tram lines were laid through Altstadt, the first—the so-called Dienstmädchenlinie (Handmaid's line)—from the Zeil past the Trierischen Hof (hotel) in the direction of the cathedral, the other along the newly laid Brauchbachstrasse in an east to west direction. While the Dienstmädchen line was never successful and had been shut down after the First World War, the east–west line remained and is now known as the Altstadtstrecke. In 1986 its redundant status was brought to an end due to the intervention of the district president in Darmstadt. In the meantime the Altstadtstrecke gained a firm place in local public passenger transport, especially with the Ebbelwei-express, which serves an exclusive tourist route.

Three bridges lead out of the Altstadt over the Main; Alte Brücke, Eiserner Steg and Untermainbrücke.

The Mainkai (Main quay), as the name suggests, stands on the oldest harbour in the city. Ships are still moored there today; however, these only serve tourists along the Main and the Rhine. Ships transporting goods are instead found, as in the city's early days, in the main harbours of Frankfurt.

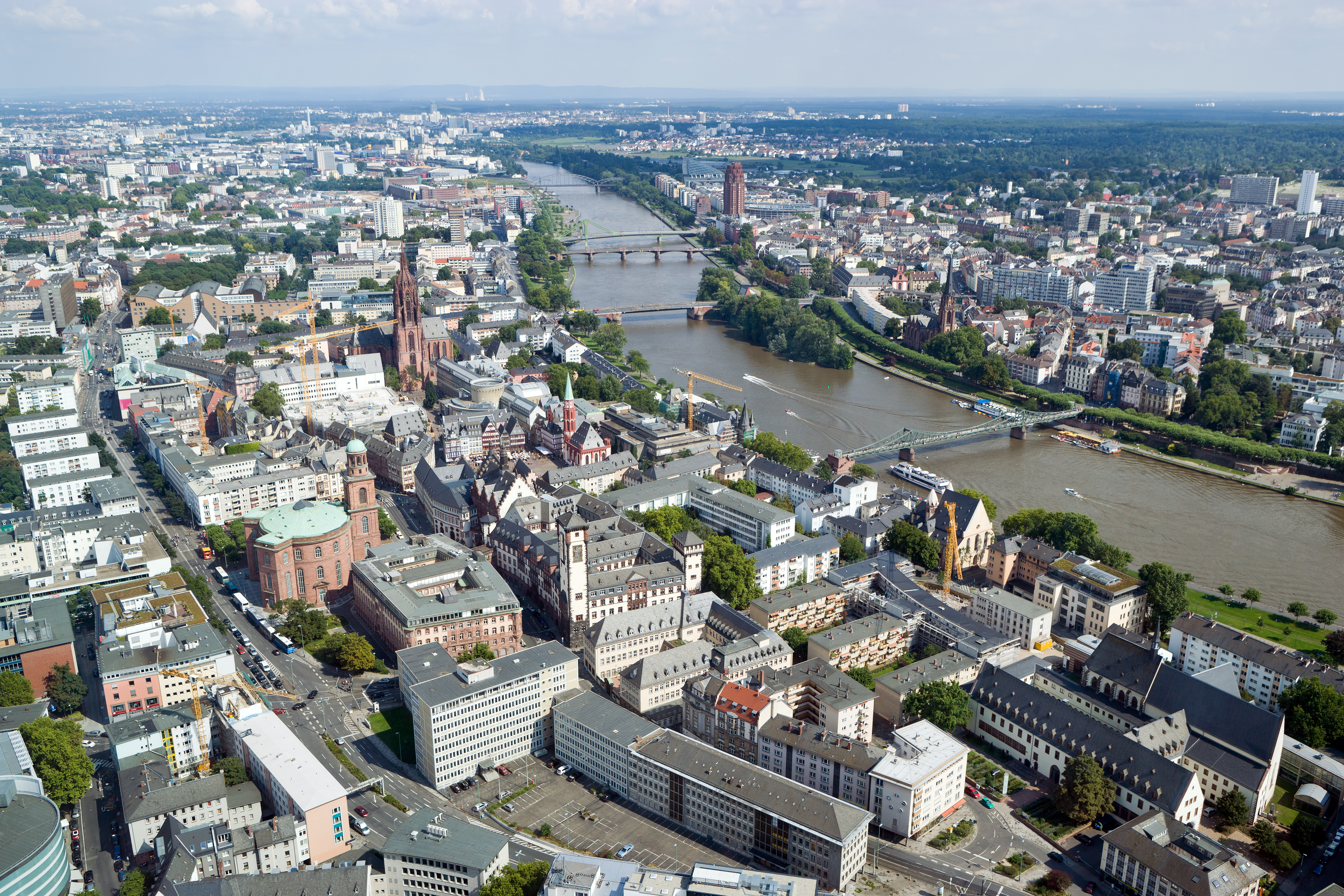
Aerial view of the Altstadt

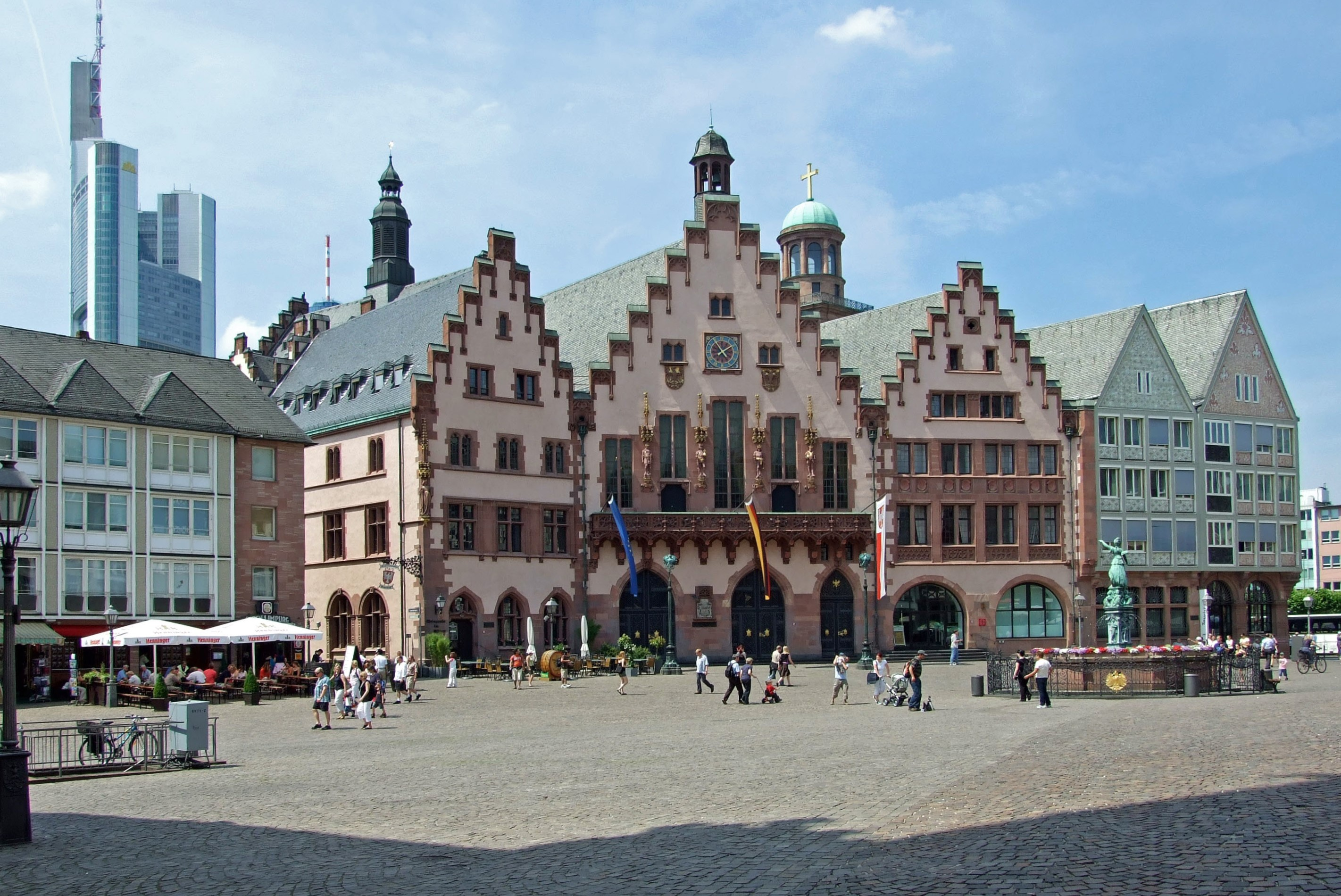
The Römerberg, the Altstadt's central square

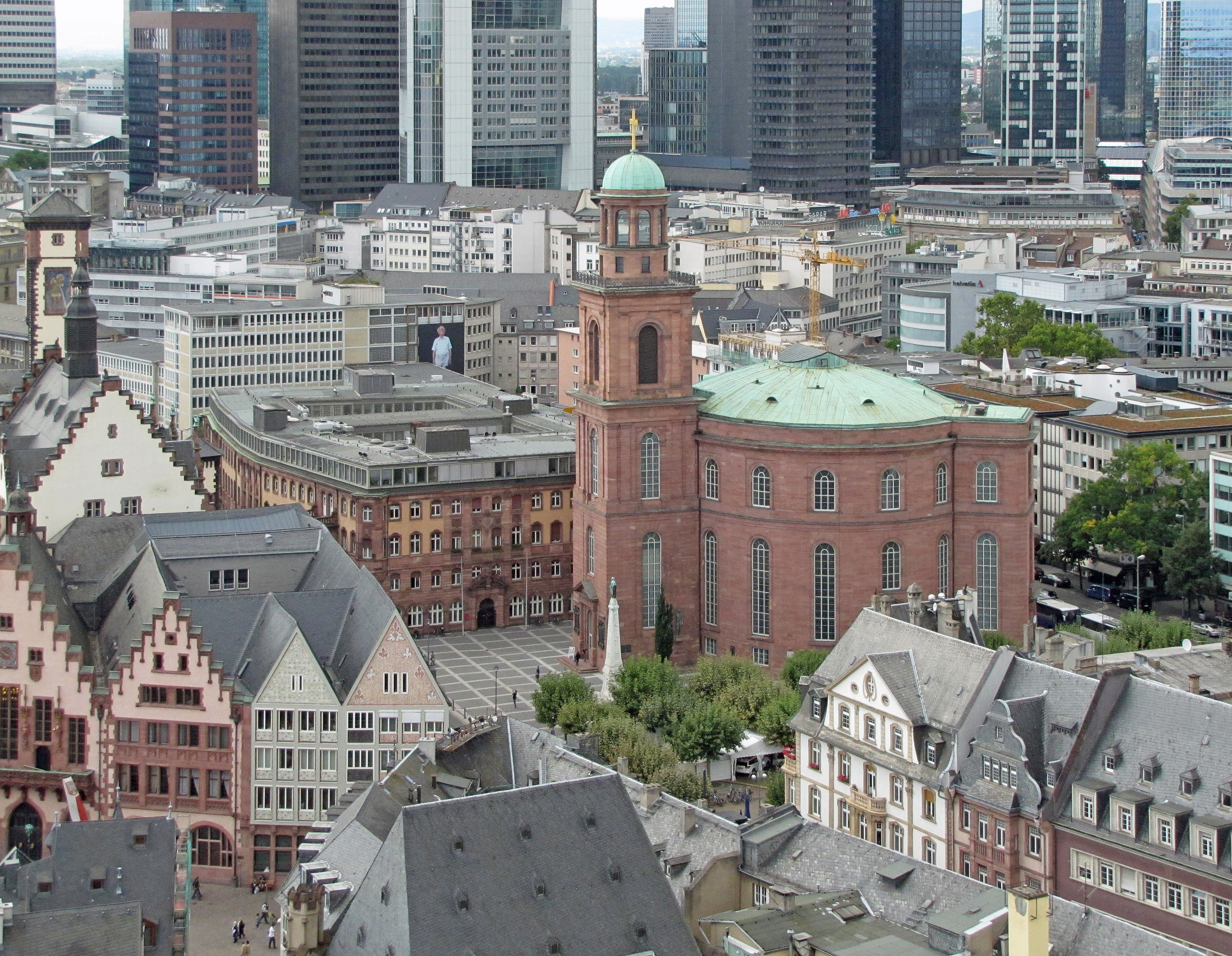
Paulskirche

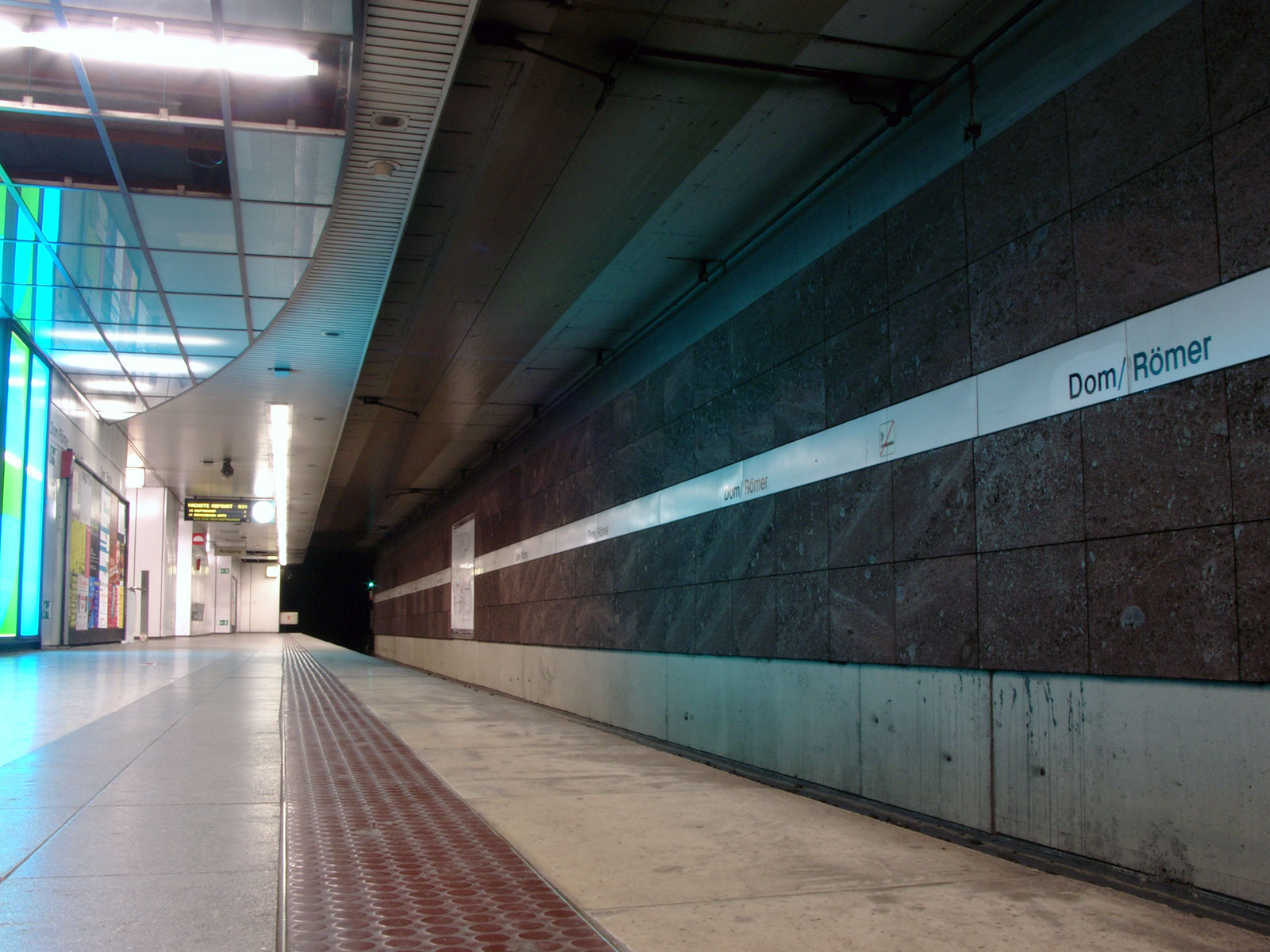
Dom/Römer metro station

== History ==
After the Nazis seized power in 1933, the fascist regime elevated Altstadtgesundung (old town healing) into a prestige project.

'Clearing out' was a euphemism for extensive gutting carried out in some of the courtyards that were completely built up over the centuries. The Nazi city administration under Mayor Friedrich Krebs used the project to change the social structure of the old town in terms of its ideology. They said that old-established residents of the old town should be placed in new housing developments on the outskirts of the city and the renovated old town apartments should primarily be awarded to traders, craftsmen and party members. In doing so, the city also wanted to correspond to its Nazi honorary title awarded in 1935 as the city of German crafts. Fried Lübbecke and the poet Alfons Paquet opposed the destruction of medieval buildings. Her submissions were disqualified as "shouting from old town fanatics who judge things of community life not even out of bad will but from a limited view".

=== Reconstruction of historical buildings ===
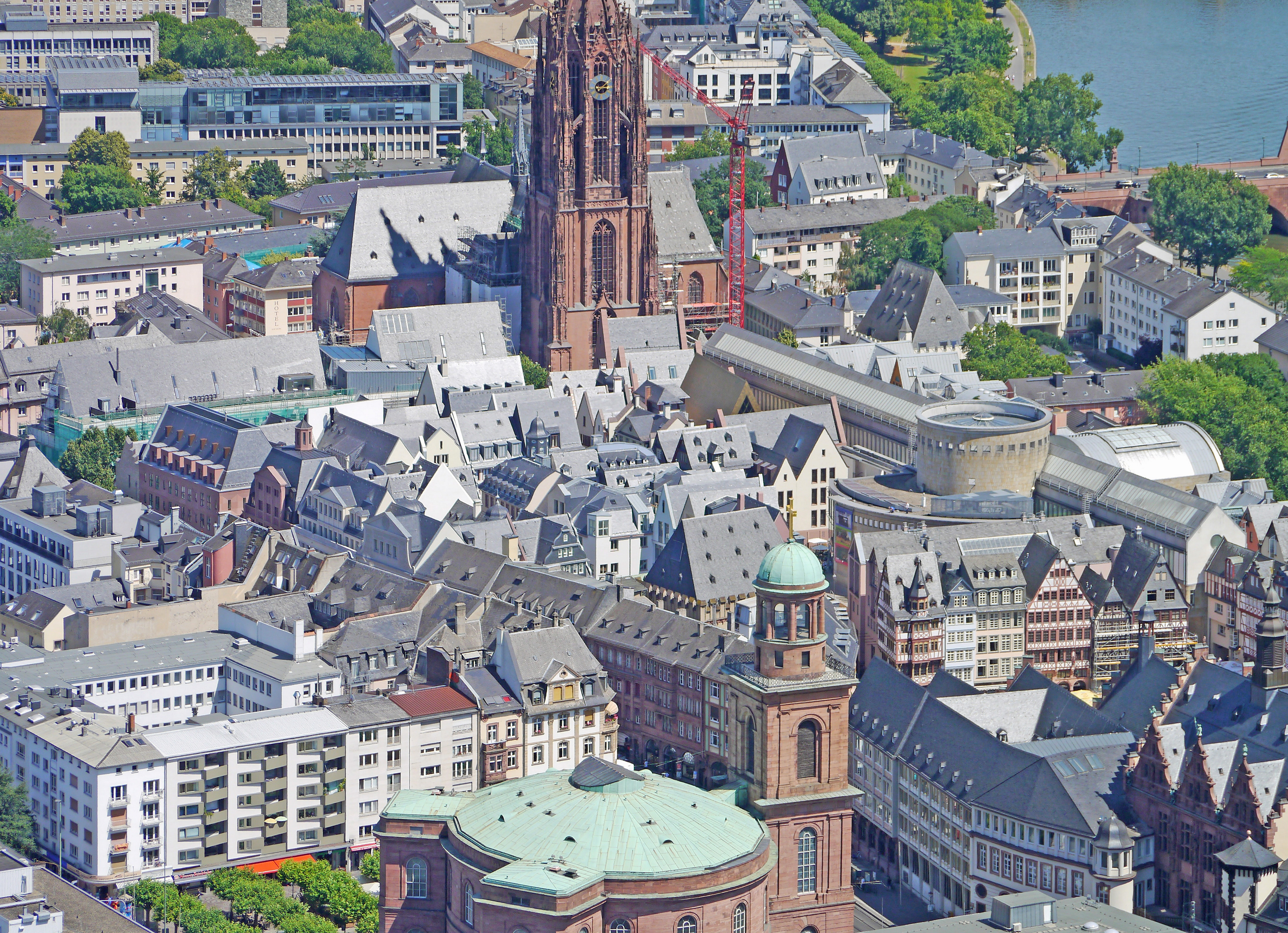
Aerial view of the reconstructed Altstadt area in 2018 after the completion of the Dom-Römer project

The city council decided to demolish the Technical City Hall, A technical and emotional discussion about the reconstruction of this old town district began when almost the entire historical nucleus of the city between the cathedral and the Römer became an open space again. In 2007, the factions of the CDU and Bündnis 90 / Die Grünen, ruling since the municipal elections in Frankfurt in 2006, reached an agreement with the FDP and the free voters against the votes of the SPD and Die Linke for the new construction of the Dom-Römer area on a compromise.

== Districts and sights of the Altstadt ==
There are numerous sights in the old town, although most of the buildings are reconstructions after severe war destruction. All sights are close together and can be reached by tram and subway.

=== Römerberg and surroundings ===
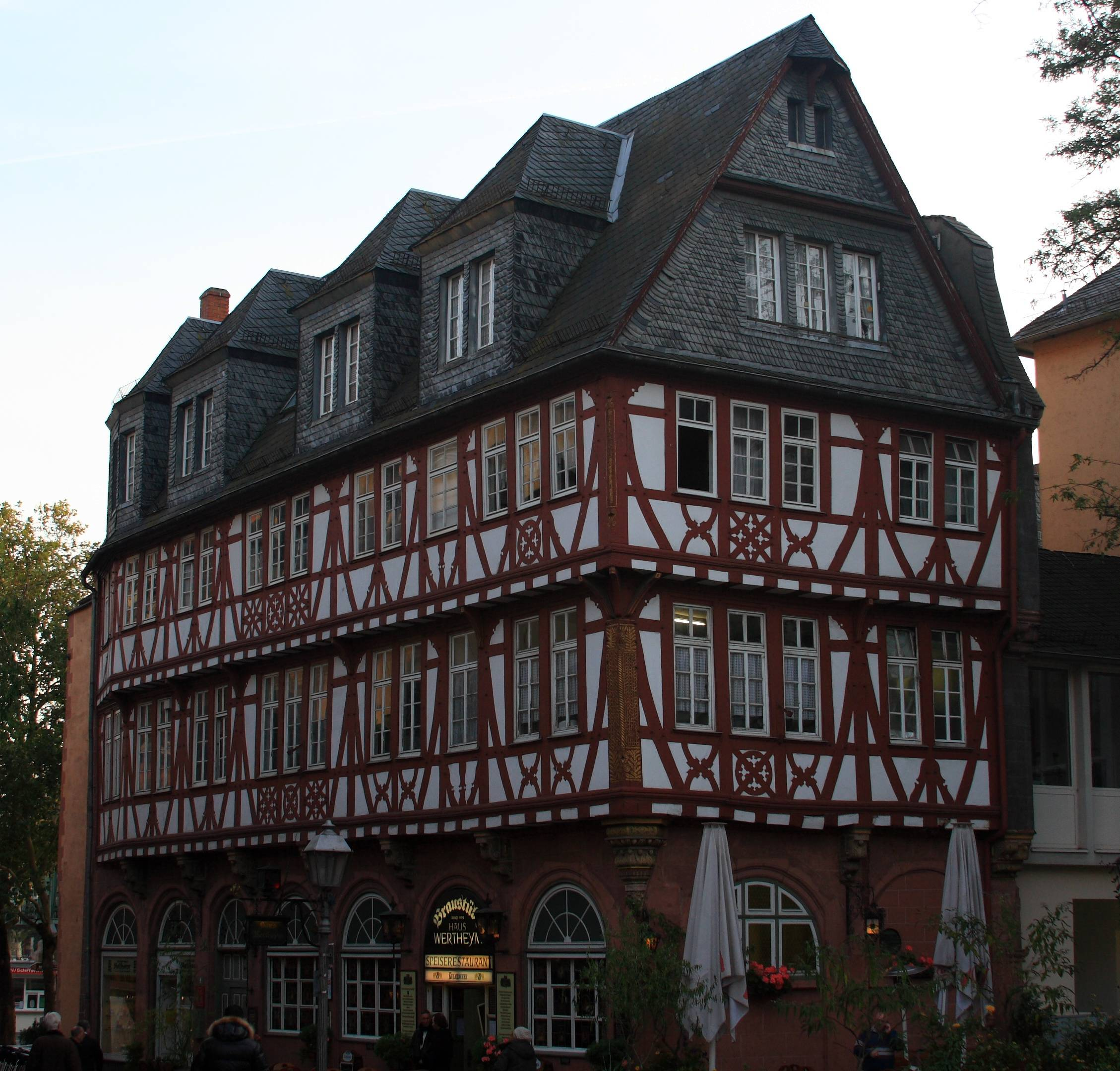
Wertheim House, the only original half-timbered house in the Altstadt

The Römerberg is the centre of the old town. Here stands the Römer, the historic town hall and symbol of the city. It was acquired in 1405 by the city, which needed a new town hall, as the previous town hall had to be demolished to build the cathedral tower. By 1878 the ten neighboring houses were also acquired by the city and structurally connected to the Römer. The five houses next to each other, whose facade faces the Römerberg, are called Alt Limpurg, Zum Römer, Löwenstein, Frauenstein and Salzhaus. Before its destruction, the Salzhaus was one of the most beautiful half-timbered houses in Germany. It was rebuilt in a simplified manner after its destruction in the war.

In the middle of the square is the Justice Fountain, which was built from sandstone in the 17th century. The construction was replaced in 1887 by a bronze replica. His name comes from the statue of Justitia that crowns him. In contrast to her depictions, Justitia was not blindfolded in Frankfurt. According to tradition, the fountain was fed with red and white wine at imperial coronations.

The Wertheim House (around 1600), is the only completely undamaged preserved half-timbered house in the old town. It is an ornate three-story Renaissance house with the stone ground floor common in Frankfurt. Opposite is the Rententurm, an important Frankfurt port building, where customs duties and port fees were collected. It was completed in 1456.

North of the Römerberg on Paulsplatz is the New Town Hall, built around 1900 with rich neo-Renaissance and neo-Baroque decor, as well as the Paulskirche, where the German National Assembly met in 1848/1849.

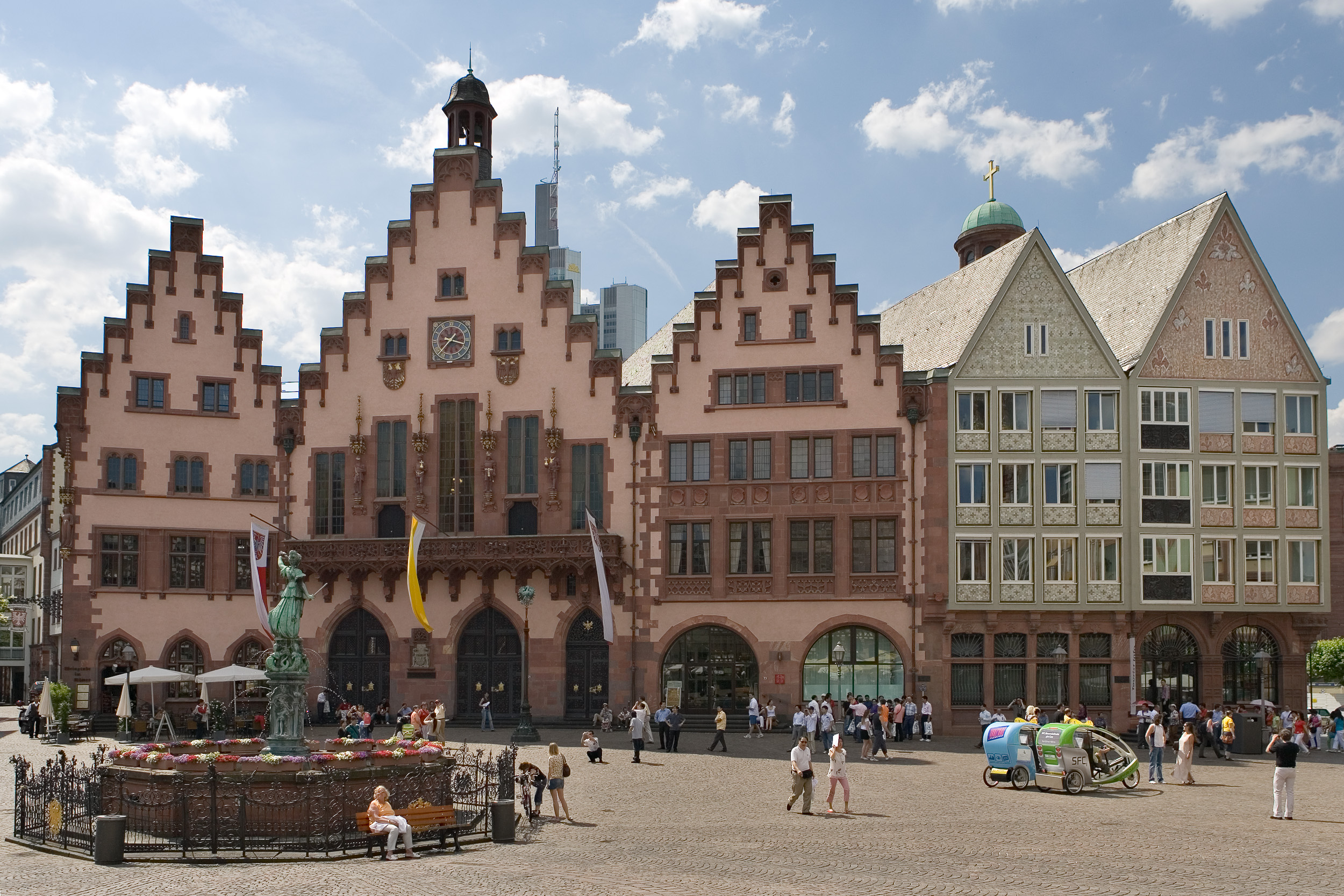
Römerberg with Römer

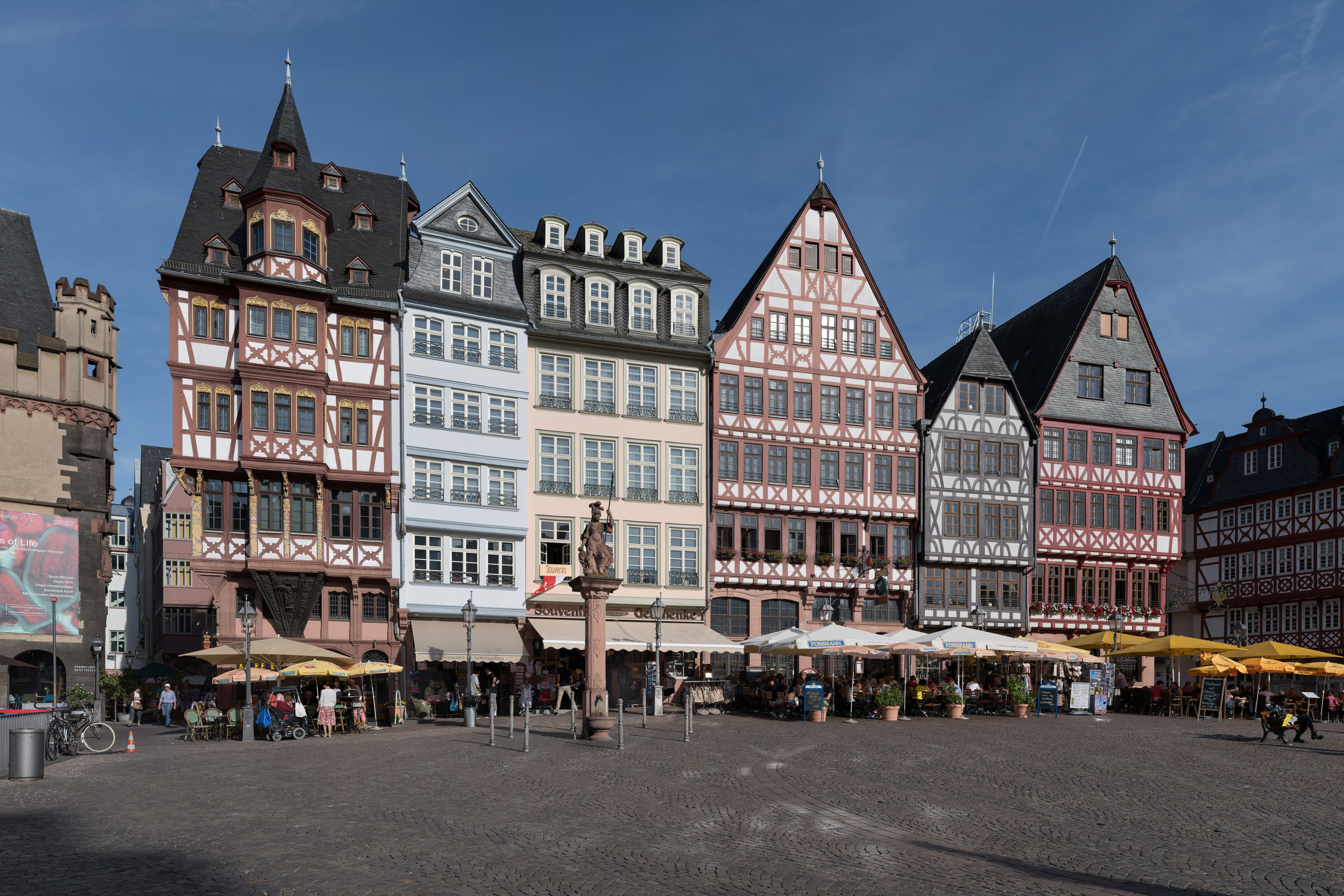
Samstagsberg, west view

=== Cathedral area ===
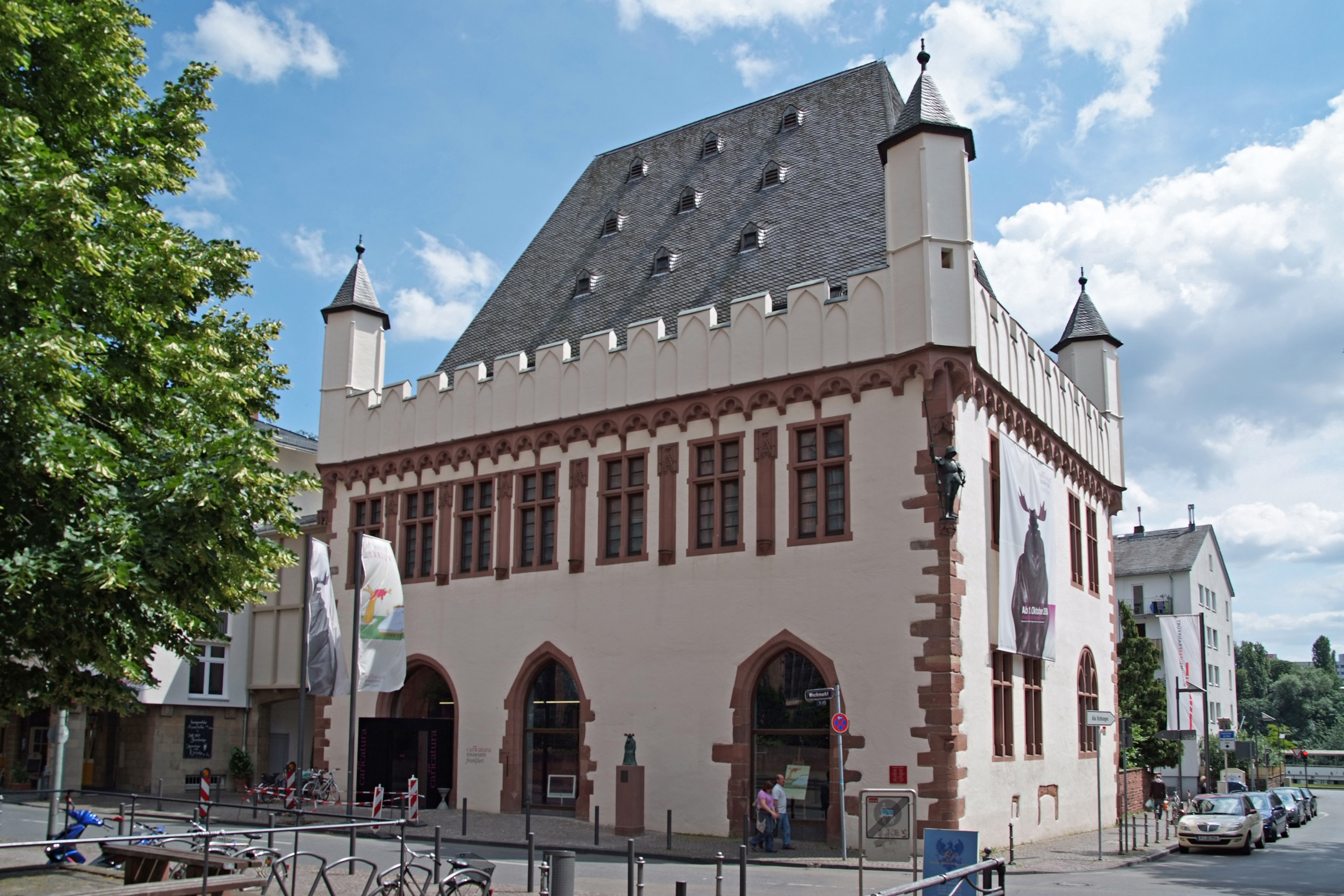
Canvas House, 2009

Around 300 meters east of the Römerberg rises the largest and most important church in the city, the Catholic imperial cathedral St. Bartholomew with its 95 meter high west tower. The majority of German kings were chosen here since the Middle Ages. From 1562 to 1792, 10 emperors of the Holy Roman Empire were crowned in the Bartholomäuskirche. The market (Kramgasse in the Middle Ages) runs between the cathedral and Römerberg, the main street of the old town that was rebuilt more than 70 years after its destruction. The Coronation Trail ran here, which the Emperor took after the coronation to celebrate the Römerberg.

In front of the west tower of the cathedral is the archaeological garden, which was built over 2012 to 2015 with the town house on the market, in which the remains of the foundations of the Roman military camp, the Carolingian Palatinate and medieval town houses are open to the public. The streets behind the Lämmchen, Neugasse and the Hühnermarkt, which have been resurrected after the demolition of the Technical Town Hall, with their new buildings and reconstructions have been accessible again since May 2018. With the House of the Golden Waage and the New Red House, two of the most famous half-timbered buildings in the old town were rebuilt. Further reconstructions are the houses Grüne Linde, Würzgarten and Rotes Haus am Markt. Striking new buildings are the Großer Rebstock houses on the market next to the Haus am Dom, Neues Paradies on the corner of the Hühnermarkt, Altes Kaufhaus, the city of Milan and Zu den Drei Römer on the western edge of the new development area.

On the north side of the Old Market is the Stone House, a 15th-century Gothic patrician building. It is the seat of the Frankfurter Kunstverein. A gate passage from the Nürnberger Hof (around 1410), the trade fair quarter of the Nuremberg merchants, has been preserved near the Stone House.

The Kunsthalle Schirn, opened in 1986, stretches south of the market, for example along the former Bendergasse. In the same block, on the north side of Saalgasse, townhouses were built in the proportions of the former old town, but in the postmodern architectural style of the time. South of the cathedral on Weckmarkt is the canvas house, architecturally related to the stone house, which today houses the Museum of Comic Art.

Between the cathedral, Fahrgasse and Main was built in the style of the time in the 1950s. Most of the historic streets of the former butcher's quarter were lost. Quiet, green courtyards were created, whose irregular design and small passageways could remind people with a lot of imagination of the enchanted old town streets. In the former old town there were numerous small fountains, many of which could be saved and put back in the courtyards.

=== Western old town ===
The most striking building in the western old town is the Leonhardskirche, the only church in downtown Frankfurt that remained undamaged in the Second World War. The north portal and the two east towers are still Romanesque, the basilica itself is late Gothic. Cathedral choir Madern Gerthener designed the high choir.

A few steps away is the former Carmelite monastery, today the seat of the Institute for Urban History and the Archaeological Museum.

The Goethe House, the poet's birthplace, is located north of Berliner Strasse in the Großer Hirschgraben.

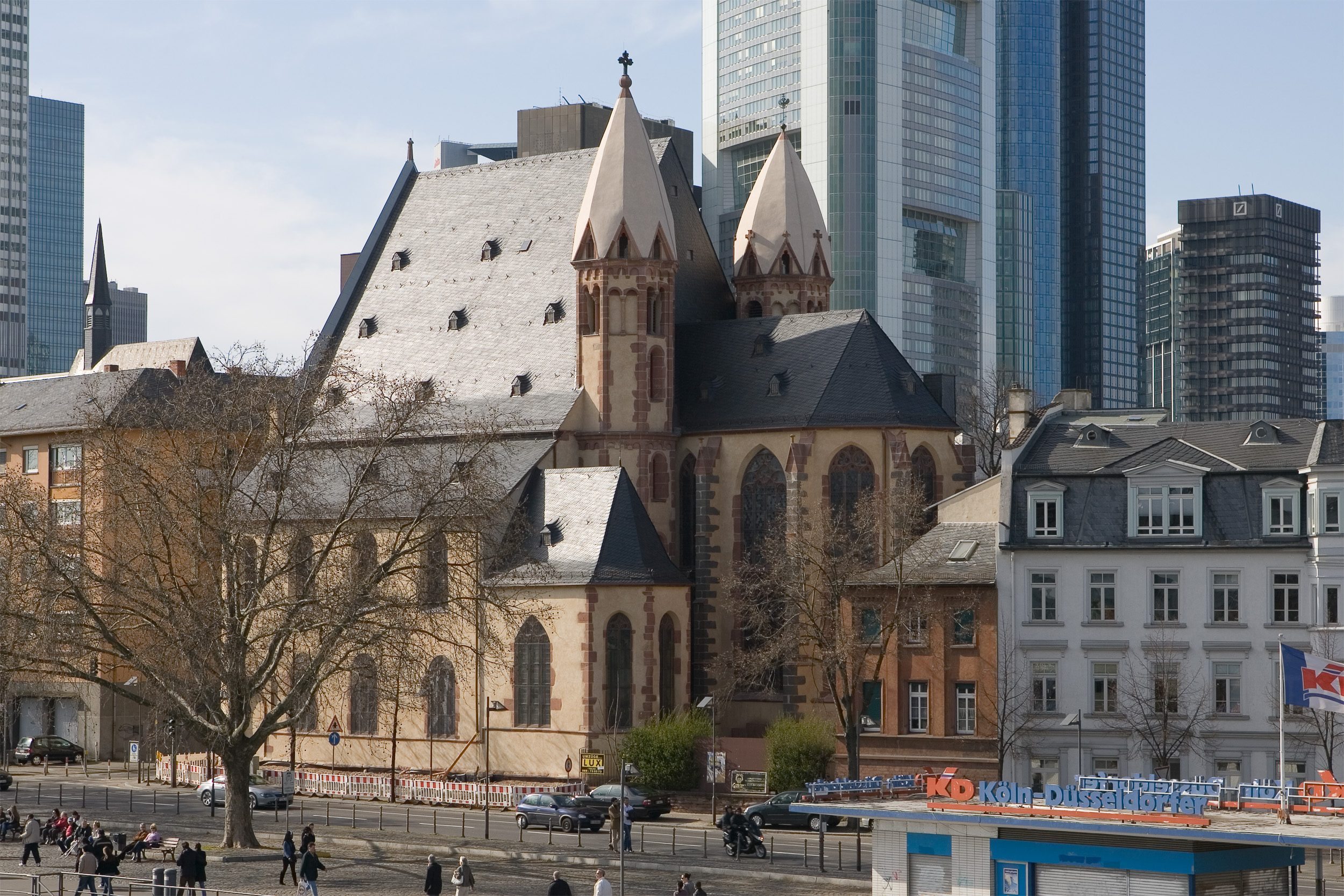
Leonhardskirche

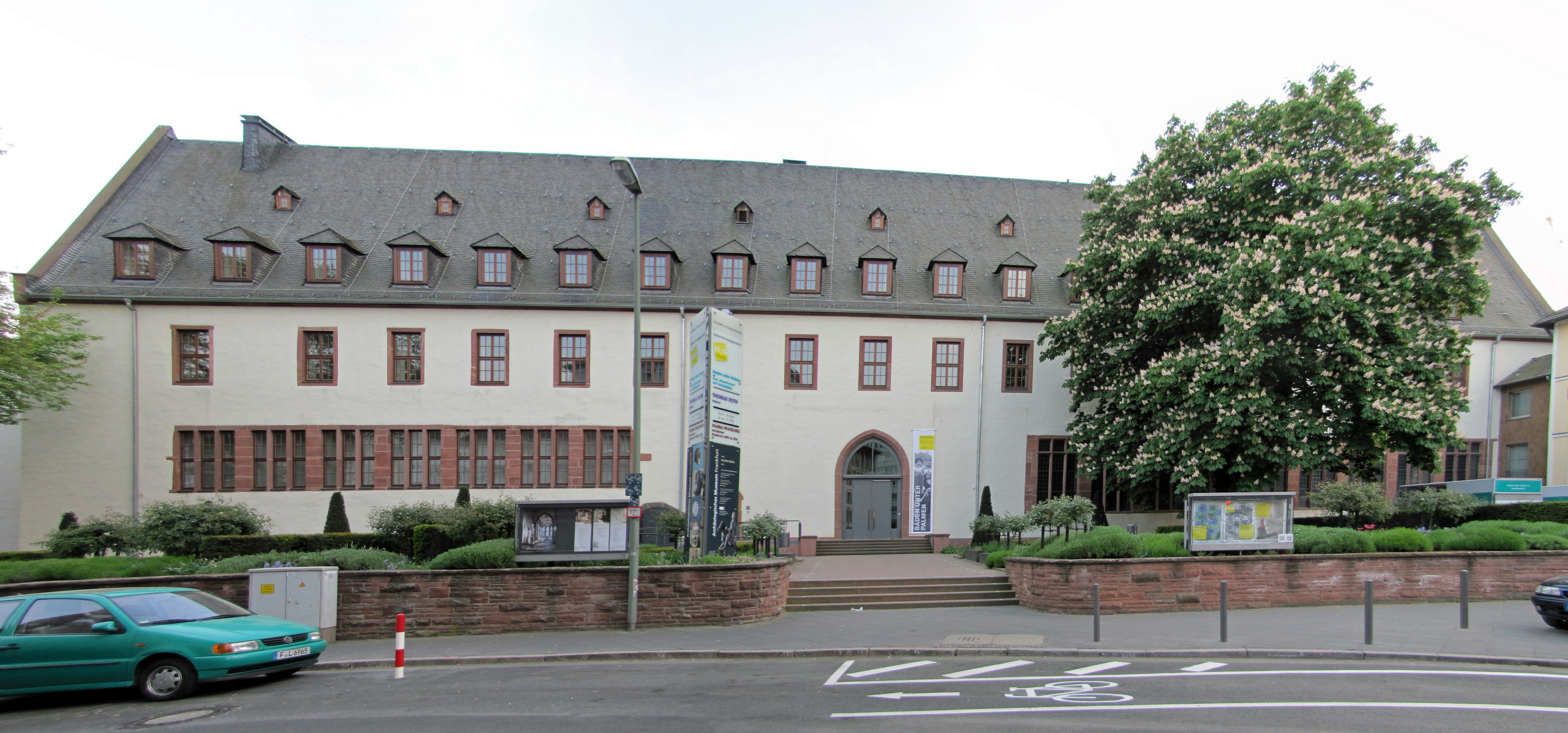
Carmelite monastery

=== Northern old town ===
The northern old town is the area between today's Berliner Straße and the Staufenmauer, the former course of which can be seen on the Graben streets (Hirschgraben, Holzgraben). It is the area that the city gained through the second expansion in the 12th century. In contrast to the older part in the area of the former Carolingian Palatinate, which has an irregular road network, the northern old town had an almost right-angled road structure.

Most of the northern part of the old town was destroyed on 26 June 1719 during the "Great Christian Fire" (eight years earlier to distinguish it from the "Great Jewish Fire" in Judengasse). In the area between Fahrgasse, Schnurgasse and Töngesgasse, 282 people died and 425 houses were destroyed. However, the area was quickly rebuilt on the old, small plots.

=== Eastern old town ===
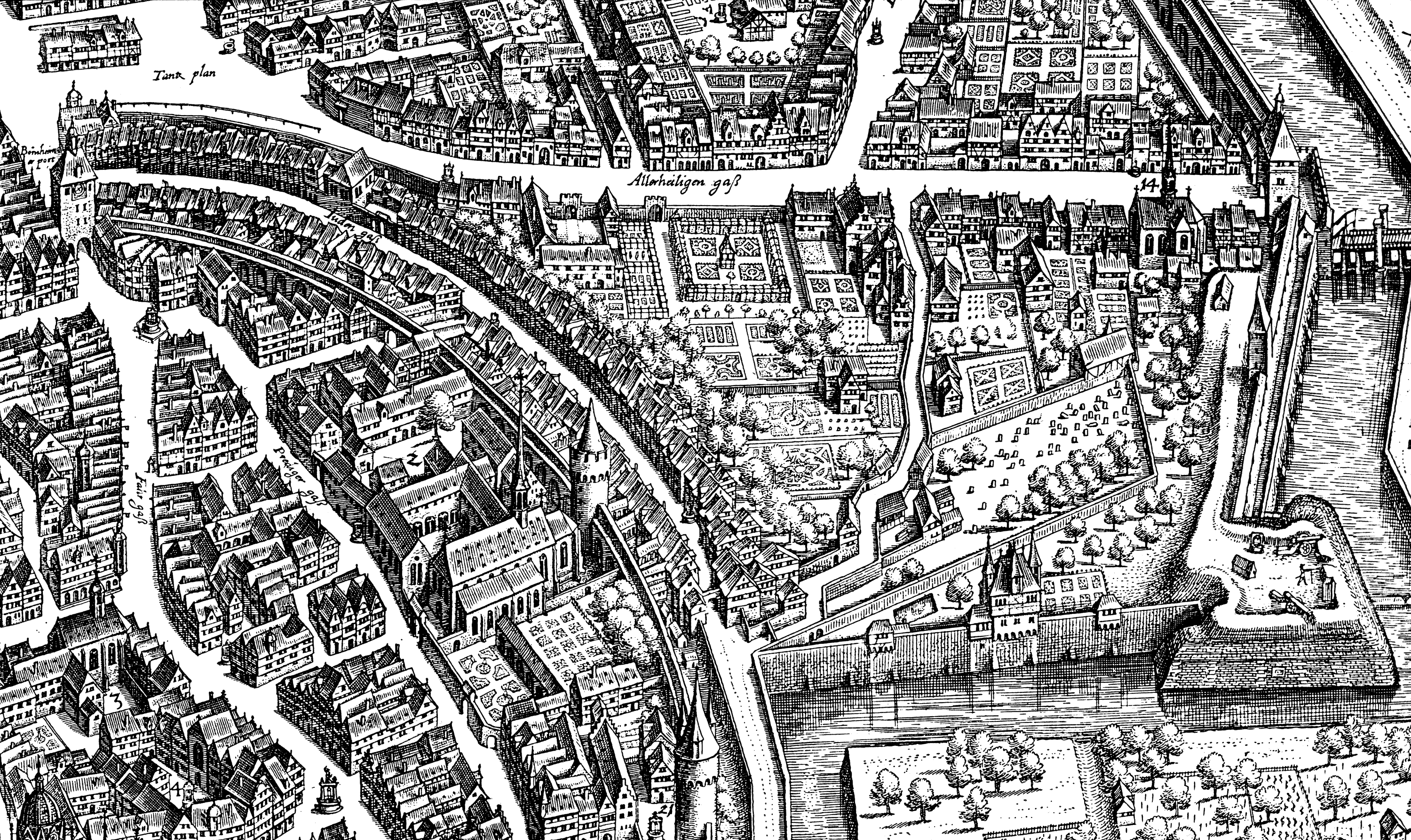
The eastern old town, the Judengasse, the Staufenmauer and the Bornheimer Tor, 1628

The main street of the eastern old town was the Fahrgasse. It ran from the Bornheim gate at the Konstablerwache to the Old Bridge; all traffic over the only Main crossing between Mainz and Aschaffenburg passed through this street.

To the east of Fahrgasse is the former Dominican monastery, rebuilt from 1953 to 1957 on the old floor plan, with the Church of the Holy Spirit. It is the seat of the Evangelical City Deanery and the Evangelical Regional Association Frankfurt. To the east of it is Börneplatz, the largest and busiest square in the district. Under changing names, it was the centre of Jewish life in Frankfurt. The Judengasse ended here, since 1882 the Börneplatz synagogue, destroyed in the November pogroms in 1938, was here, and the Old Jewish Cemetery, Battonnstrasse, whose oldest grave monuments date from 1272, is still located here today. In the Judengasse Museum, part of the Frankfurt Jewish Museum, excavated remains of the ghetto and the synagogue can be viewed.

=== Former and reconstructed buildings ===
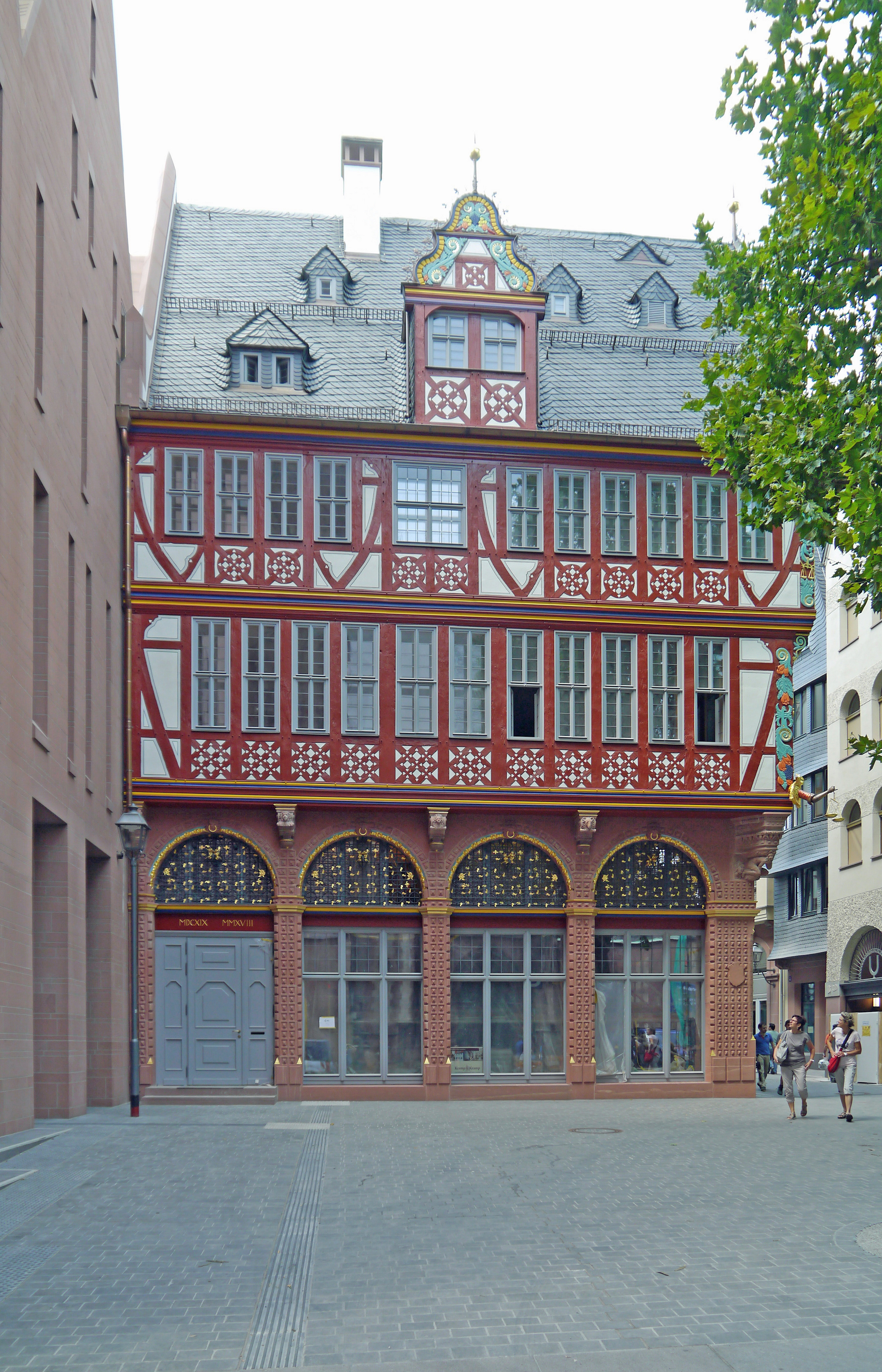
The reconstructed House of the Golden Scales

Many architectural monuments as well as striking buildings or street corners or entire streets of the old town were lost as a result of the Second World War or due to demolition, some of them were rebuilt or reconstructed - some more than 70 years after their destruction. Here are a few of the most important:

- The old stock exchange on Paulsplatz was a building of late classicism, built in 1843, burned out in 1944 and demolished in 1952.
- The old bridge was first mentioned in 1222. It has been destroyed and rebuilt at least 18 times over the centuries. In 1914 the only beautiful monument from earlier times (Goethe) worthy of such a large city was demolished. The New Old Bridge, inaugurated in its place in 1926, which was simply rebuilt after the war was destroyed in 1965.
- Bendergasse was the epitome of an old town alley with numerous five- to six-story half-timbered buildings from the 16th to 18th centuries. Destroyed in 1944, the site was cleared until 1950. Today the Schirn art gallery is located here.
- The Five-Finger Square was a popular postcard motif, a tiny old town square near the Römerberg (burned out in 1944).
- The Haus zum Esslinger on the Chicken Market was a baroque altered, late Gothic half-timbered building in which Goethe's aunt Johanna Melber lived in the 18th century, which he also described in his autobiographical work Poetry and Truth. The building burned down in 1944 and the ruins were removed in 1950. The reconstruction opened in 2018 and is the seat of the Struwwelpeter Museum.
- The Fürsteneck House was a Gothic patrician stone building from the 13th century. Extensively restored in the 1920s, it burned out in 1944. The remains were torn down after the war.
- The House of the Golden Scales in Höllgasse west of the cathedral was an elaborately decorated Renaissance half-timbered building. Built between 1618 and 1619, it was renovated at the beginning of the 20th century. The Golden Scales burned out in 1944 and its remains were cleared in 1950. The reconstruction of the Golden Scales will reopen in 2018 as a branch of the Historical Museum.
- The Lichtenstein House was a Gothic patrician stone house on the south-western Römerberg, which was changed in the 18th century in the Baroque style. It burned down in 1944, the well-preserved but unsecured ruin was badly damaged in a storm in 1946 and, shortly thereafter, was torn down despite the planned reconstruction.
- The Rebstock farm was a half-timbered building from the 17th century and one of the most important inns in the old town. The poet Friedrich Stoltze was born here in 1816. Large parts were demolished at the beginning of the 20th century for the breakthrough of Braubachstrasse, the rest were destroyed in 1944.
- Behind the Lämmchen was the name of a narrow alley between the Nürnberger Hof and the Chicken Market, in which some of the most important half-timbered houses in the city were located, including the houses Zum Nürnberger Hof, Zum Mohrenkopf and Goldenes Lämmchen. From 1974 to 2010, the entire area was built over with the Technical Town Hall.
- The Chicken Market between the cathedral and the Römer was a picturesque ensemble of half-timbered houses from the 17th and 18th centuries: the most important were the Old Red House and the New Red House at the entrance to the Tuchgaden. Both have since been reconstructed. The Stoltze Fountain stood on the chicken market until 1944, which returned to its regular place in 2016. The Schildknecht house on Hühnermarkt, built around 1405, had the largest overhang of all Frankfurt half-timbered houses at almost two meters.
- From 1462 to 1796, Judengasse was the Frankfurt ghetto. Their remains were burned down and rebuilt several times between 1874 and 1888. Only the synagogue and the Rothschildhaus were initially preserved. The synagogue fell victim to the November pogroms in 1938, the Rothschildhaus in 1944 to the bombing.
- The herb market was a place at the exit of Bendergasse to the cathedral. The baroque stone houses of the late 18th century were completely destroyed in 1944.
- The market was historically the most important old town alley in Frankfurt. The coronation route of the German emperors from the cathedral to the Römer ran through him. The countless, mostly richly decorated half-timbered buildings from the 16th to the 18th centuries were destroyed in 1944. At the beginning of the 1970s, the area was built over with the Technical Town Hall and the Römer underground station. After the town hall was demolished, the market was built again. The houses Goldene Waage, Grüne Linde, Rotes Haus, Neues Rotes Haus, Schlegel and Würzgarten were reconstructed.
- The flour scale at Garküchenplatz was built in 1719. The flour was officially weighed and cleared on the ground floor, and the upper floors served as a city prison until 1866. The building was extensively renovated in 1938 and destroyed in 1944.
- The Nürnberger Hof was an extensive building complex from the 13th century. It was largely torn down when the Braubachstrasse was built in 1905. The rest suffered severe bomb damage in 1944 and was demolished in 1953 except for the baroque gate in favor of Berliner Strasse.
- The Roseneck was a group of half-timbered houses south of the cathedral. It was completely destroyed in 1944.
- Saalgasse ran south of the Old Nikolaikirche parallel to Bendergasse. Its numerous multi-storey half-timbered buildings and some stone buildings from the 16th to the 18th centuries were destroyed in 1944 and the remains were cleared after the war. The south side was rebuilt in the 1950s, and a number of postmodern town houses were built on the north side in the early 1980s.
- The Scharnhäuser on Heilig-Geist-Plätzchen in Saalgasse were two baroque modified, late Gothic half-timbered buildings with public passageways on their ground floors on wooden pillars. In the 1770s, Johann Wolfgang Goethe conducted a successful lawsuit around one of the buildings. The buildings burned down in 1944 and were cleared until 1950.
- The Weckmarkt, south of the cathedral, was home to the canvas house built in 1399 and the former city scales from 1504, two of the most important medieval stone buildings in Frankfurt. The city scales were rebuilt around 1880 by cathedral architect Franz Josef Denzinger in the neo-Gothic style. It housed the city archive until it was destroyed in 1944. The ruins of the canvas house were rebuilt in 1982.
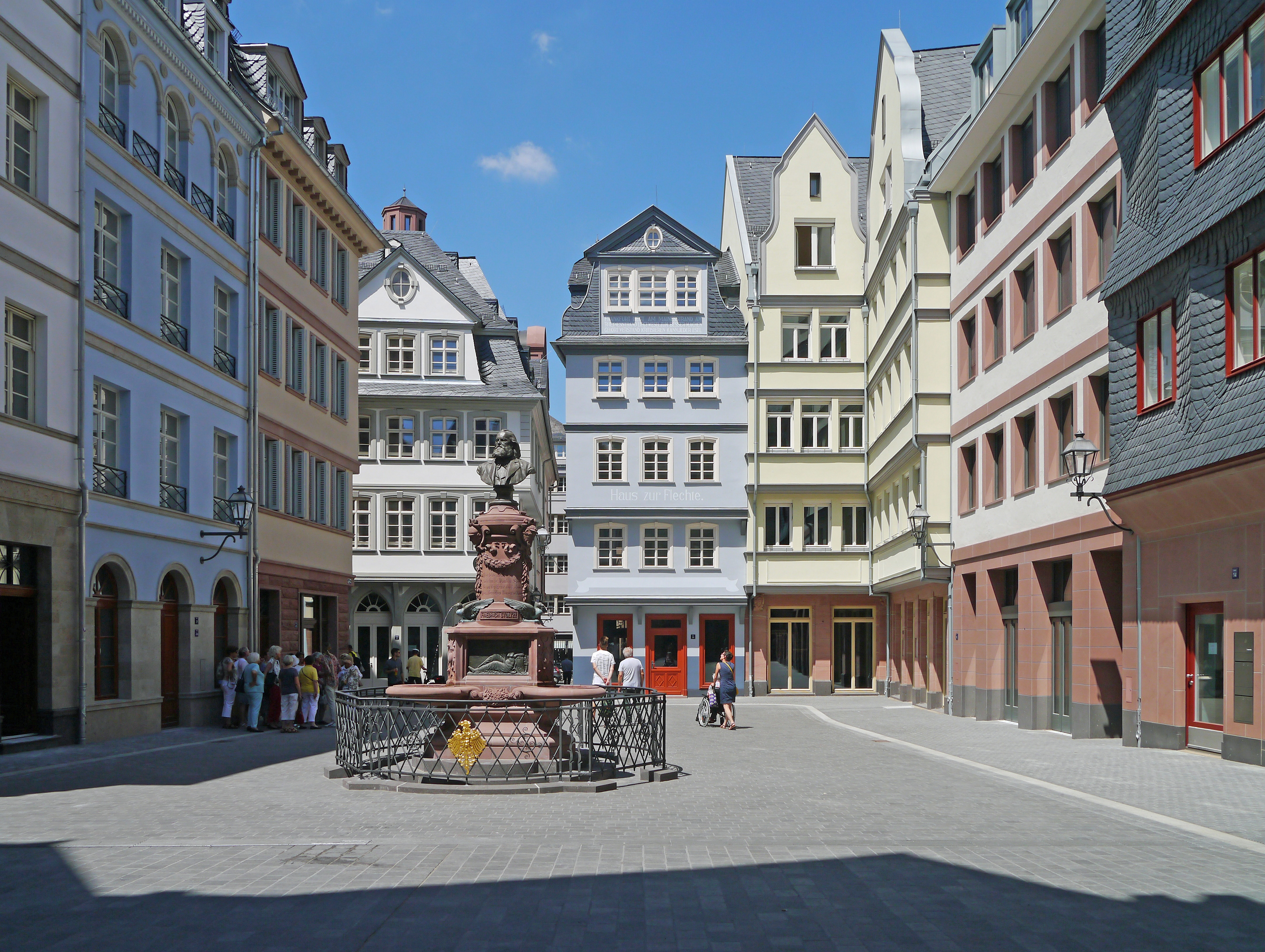
Chicken market

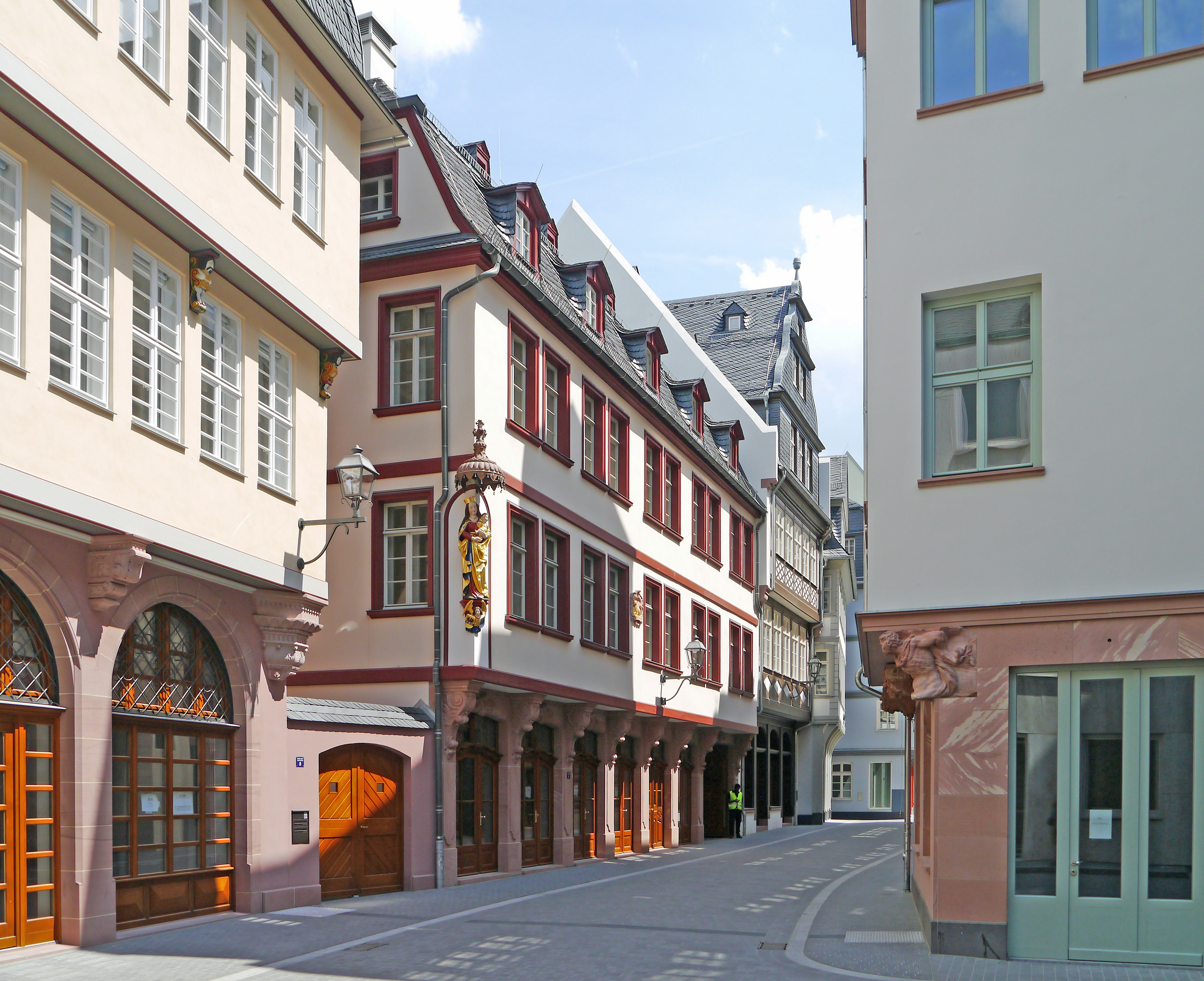
Behind the Lämmchen

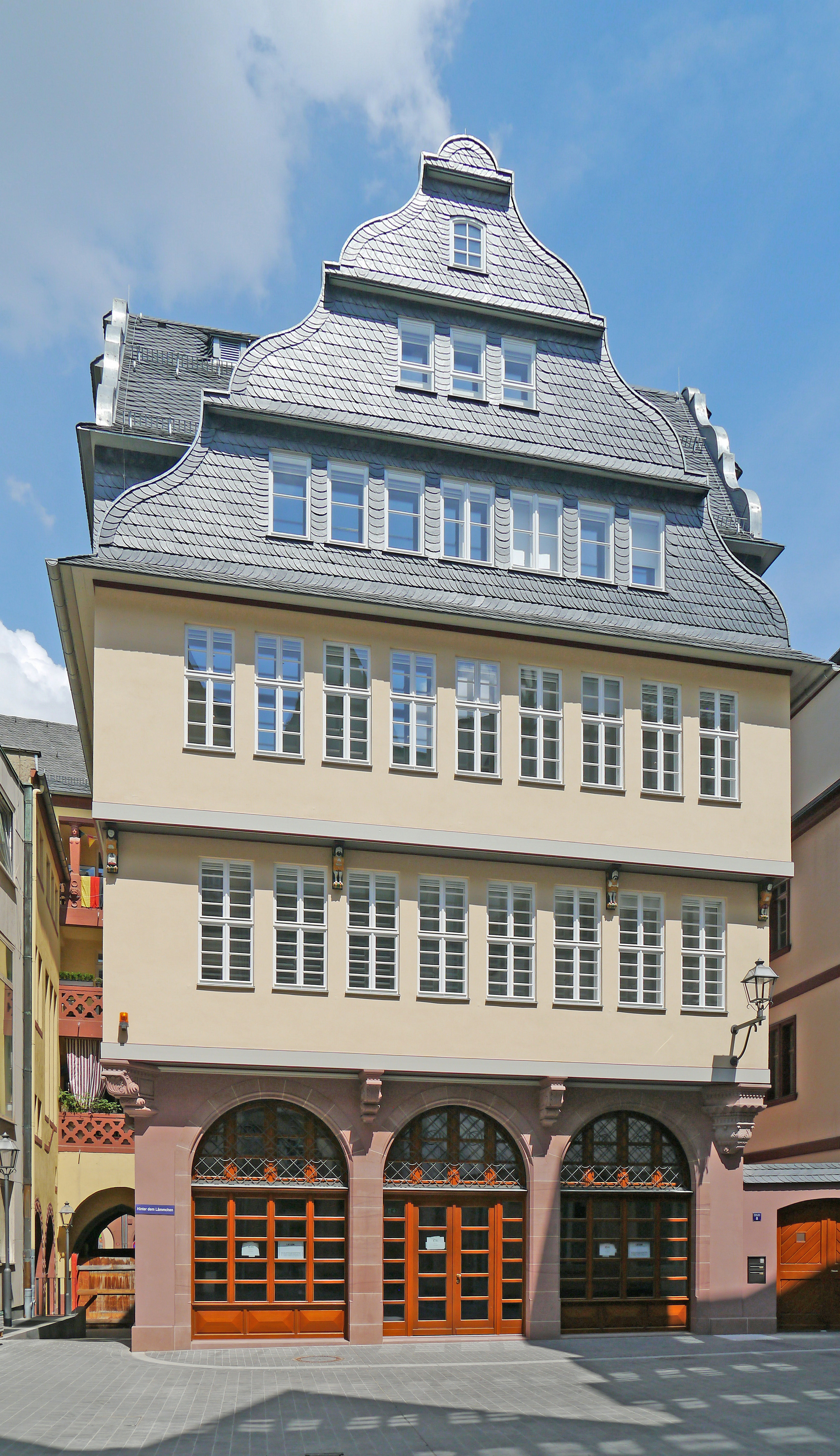
Klein Nürnberg house

== Cultural sites ==
- Schirn Art Gallery

== See also ==
- Kornmarkt (Frankfurt am Main)

== Literature ==
- Philipp Sturm, Peter Cachola Schmal, ed. (2018), Die immer Neue Altstadt: Bauen zwischen Dom und Römer seit 1900 (in German), Berlin: Jovis Verlag, ISBN 978-3-86859-501-7. Katalog zur Ausstellung im Deutschen Architekturmuseum.
