= Kornmarkt (Frankfurt am Main) =

Street in Frankfurt am Main

Kornmarkt / Buchgasse
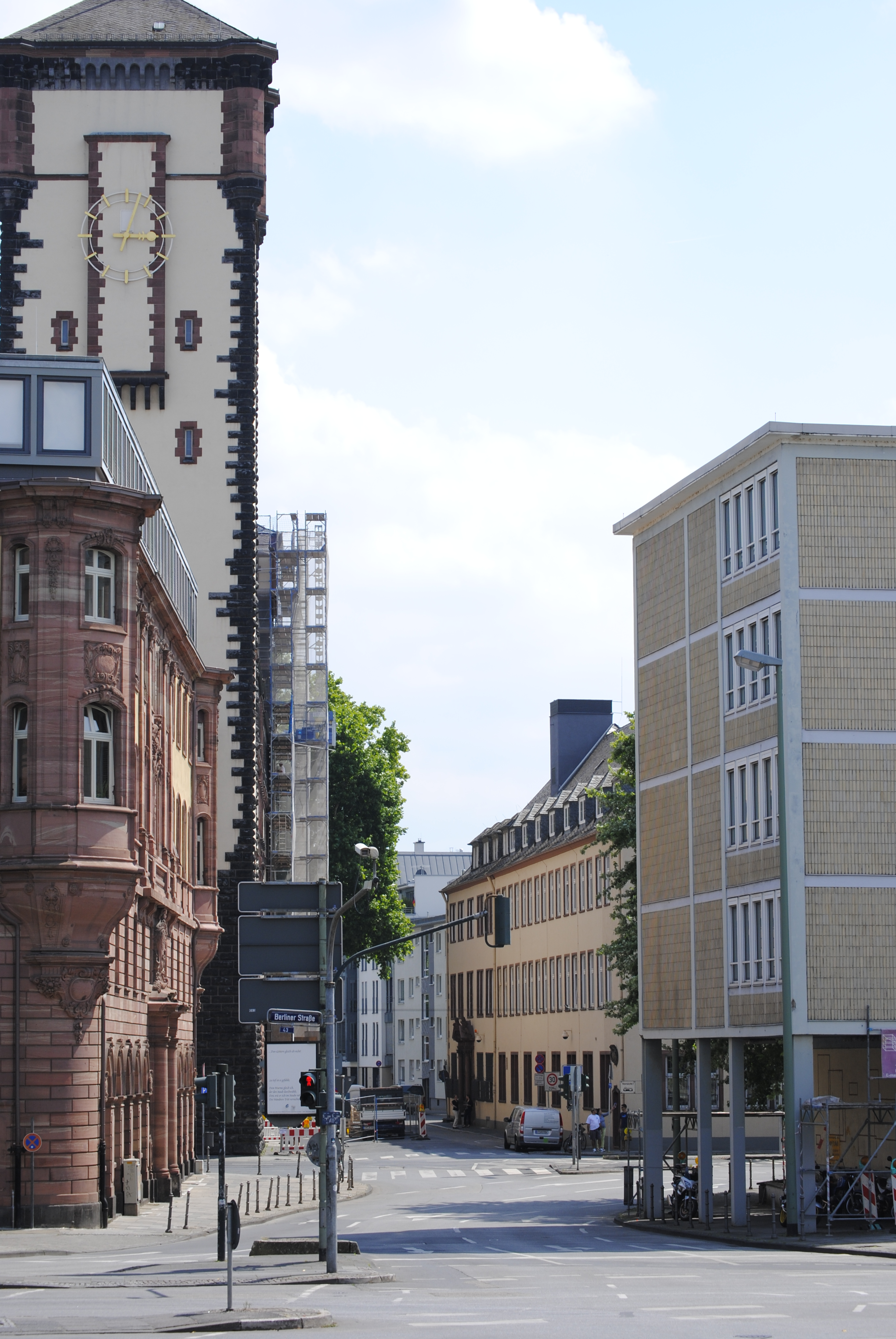
- Junction Kornmarkt and Berliner Straße with the town hall buildings (left)
- Interactive map of Kornmarkt / Buchgasse
- Type: Urban street
- Length: 500 m (1,600 ft)
- Location: Altstadt (Frankfurt am Main)
- Coordinates: 50°6′38.8″N 80°40′46.1″W
- North: Staufenmauer
- South: Leonhardstor

The Kornmarkt, along with its southern section known as Buchgasse since early modern times, is a street in the old town of Frankfurt am Main. In medieval Frankfurt, this street held immense importance as one of the three major north-south main streets, connecting two city gates and two grand churches. However, in present times, it exists in a rather inconspicuous manner. The street’s urban context has been largely lost - due to road breaches and wartime destruction in the bombing campaign, but above all the reconstruction of the 1950s, which failed to consider the preservation of the historical townscape.

Despite its current modest standing, the street's historical significance is noteworthy. It served as the birthplace of the Frankfurt Book Fair, and a brief meeting place of the Frankfurt National Assembly. Moreover, it has been the residence of Frankfurt's patrician families for centuries, further adding to its cultural heritage.

== Origin, location, significance ==
The Kornmarkt came into existence as a result of the city’s expansion in the twelfth century. The street's earliest record can be traced back to 15 August 1219, when King Frederick II of the Hohenstaufen dynasty mentioned it in an official document. At the citizens of Frankfurt's request (ad supplicationem fidelium nostrorum universorum de Frankinfort ) King Frederick II granted a courtyard owned by the empire, situated on the Kornmarkt (aream seu curtem iacentem iuxta forum frumenti) to be used for the construction of the Leonhardkirche (Leonhard church).

Following the construction of the Staufenmauer, the city expanded northward, doubling its walled area. Previously, the main streets predominantly ran in an east-west direction, including Alte Mainzer Gasse, Saalgasse, and Markt. With the expansion, three new main streets were introduced, connecting the newly developed parts of the city with the existing ones. These main streets served the purpose of facilitating traffic between the two new inland city gates and the existing gates leading to the harbor on the banks of the Main River:

- As the easternmost of the three parallel main streets, Fahrgasse extended from Bornheimer Pforte (near today's Konstablerwache) to the Alte Brücke, which was secured by a bridge tower. Due to its regional importance as the sole crossing of the Main River between Mainz and Aschaffenburg, Fahrgasse became Frankfurt’s most vital.
- The middle link, known as Neue Kräme, did not serve as a throughway due to the absence of a city gate in the north. However, it connected the two principal squares in the Altstadt, Liebfrauenberg and Römerberg. The latter was linked to the south by the Fahrtor, which provided access to the Mainhafen. Notably, both ends of the street were adorned with significant churches: the Liebfrauenkirche to the north and the Nikolaikirche to the south.
- The westernmost of the three streets was the Kornmarkt. It stretched from the northwestern city gate, initially known as Bockenheimer Pforte (later Katharinenpforte), located at today's Hauptwache to the Leonhardstor at the Mainhaufen. Important churches were also located at these two gates, the Katharinenkirche, and the Leonhardskirche.

== Street names ==
In the Middle Ages, the entire street between Katharinenspforte and Leonhardspforte bore the uniform name Kornmarkt. Later, the street was divided into three distinct sections: the northern section extending to the intersection of Weißadlergasse and Große Sandgasse became known as Kleiner Kornmarkt, the middle section reaching the intersection with Schüppengasse and Paulsgasse was referred to as Großer Kornmarkt. The southern section from Münzgasse to Leonhardskirche was named Buchgasse in the 17th century. Today there are two street names, the section north of Bethmannstraße is called Kornmarkt, and the one south of it is Buchgasse.

== Medieval patrician palaces ==
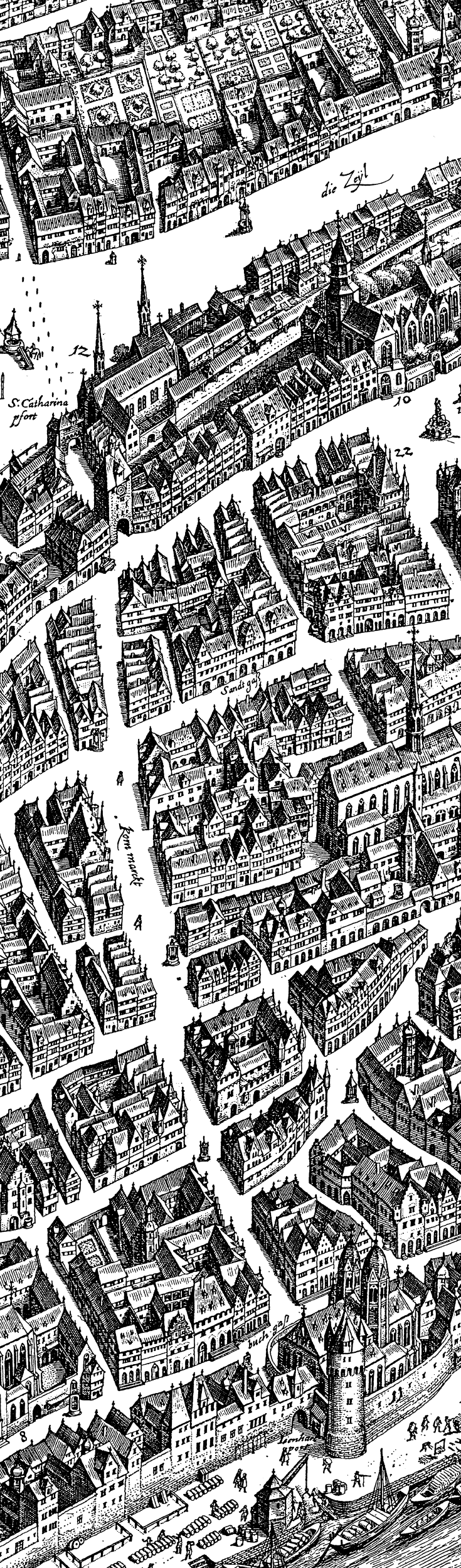
1628

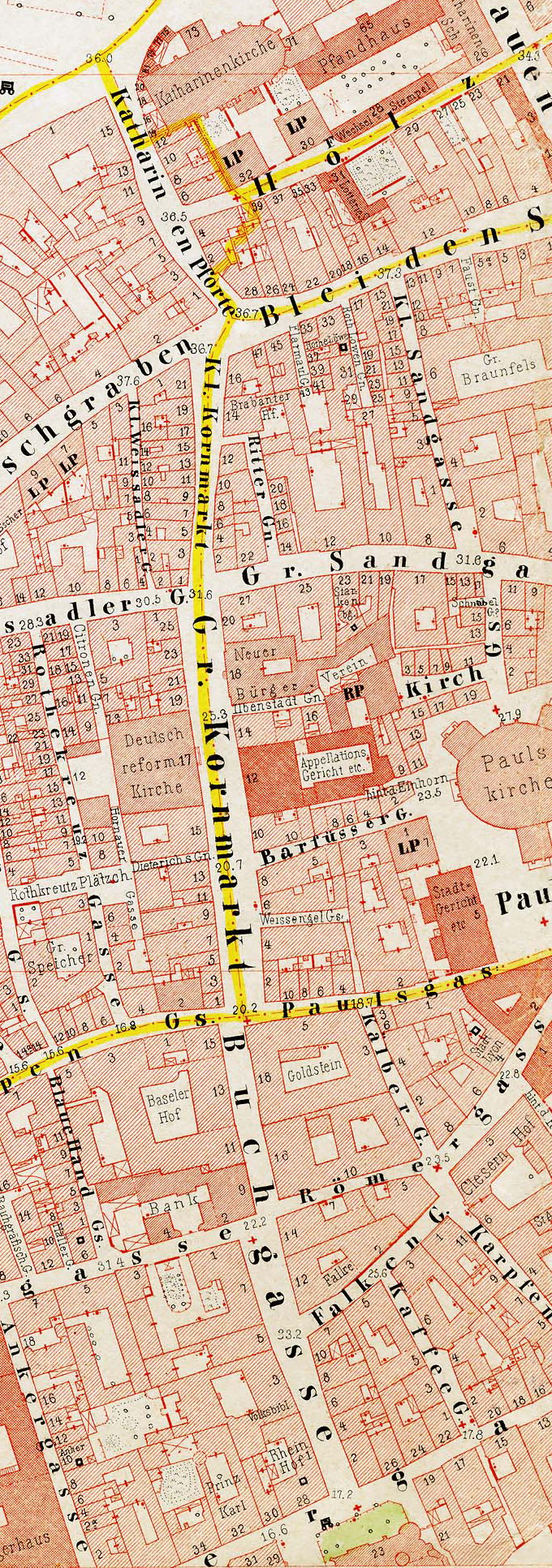
1862

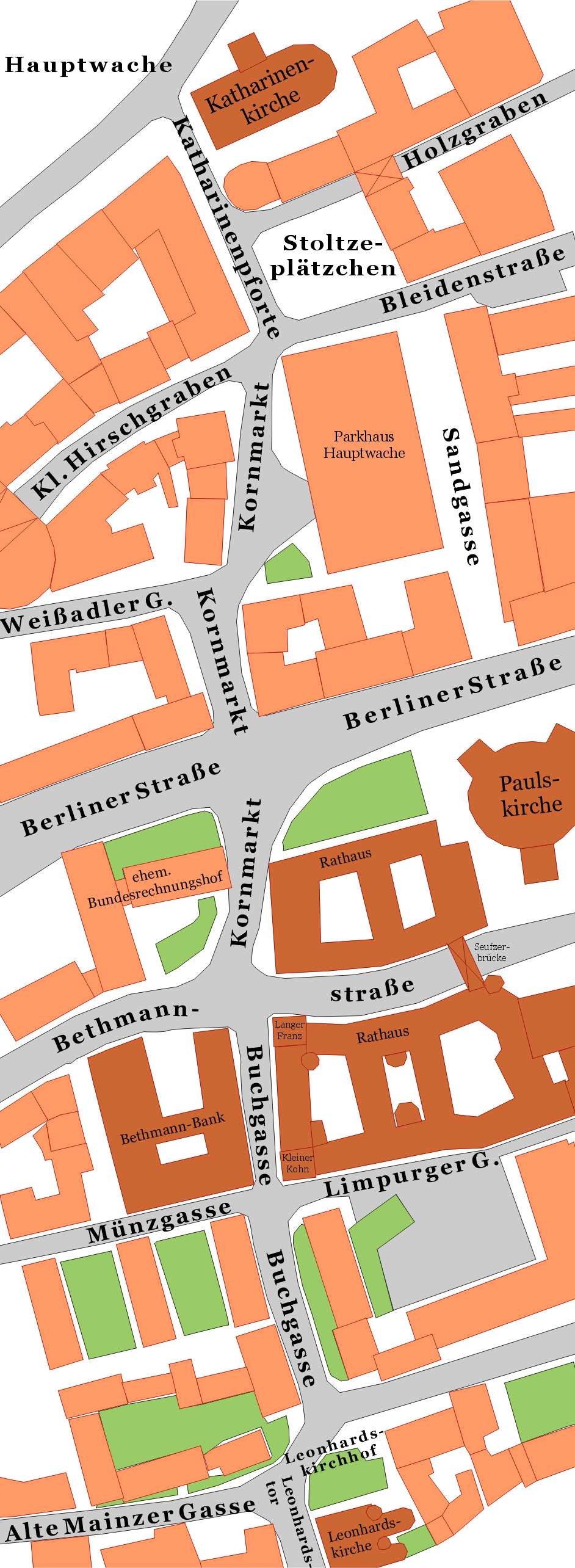
Today

As the name suggests, the Kornmarkt served as the bustling market for fruits and grains in Frankfurt until the 18th century. Additionally, this street held great appeal for upper-middle-class citizens, who built their city palaces there, often naming them after their owners. Notable examples include houses such as Zum Frosch or Zum Großen Goldstein. However, the most renowned bourgeois residence on the street was the Große Stalburg, built-in 1496 by Claus Stalburg (1469-1525), the wealthiest burgher in the city at the time and multiple times mayor of the city. The fortified Gothic stone structure with a stepped gable and turret was a late medieval magnificent construction, similar to the Stone House in the Old Market, which continues to exist today.

== The birthplace of the Frankfurt Book Fair ==
In the Middle Ages, the southern part of Kornmarkt was primarily occupied by armorers and blacksmiths. However, towards the end of the 15th century, the area underwent a significant transformation as printers and booksellers started to settle here, displacing the previously resident crafts. This influx of new inhabitants led to the southern part of Kornmarkt being renamed Buchgasse. The merchants held a book fair here twice a year from 1480. Over time, the Frankfurt Book Fair became the most important book fair in Europe. Due to the liberal regulations of the Free Imperial City, even the writings of Martin Luther could be traded here at the beginning of the Reformation, which was banned elsewhere because of heresy. At the 1520 fair, a Frankfurt bookseller sold over 1400 copies of his writings. Luther himself stayed at the Gasthof Zum Strauß on his journey to the Diet of Worms on Sunday, 14 April 1521, and on his return on Saturday, 27 April 1521. The Gasthof zum Strauß was located at the corner of Schüppengasse and Buchgasse; it was demolished in 1896 when Bethmannstrasse was built.

While Luther’s opponent Johannes Cochläus, preached against him, Frankfurt patricians such as Philipp Fürstenberger, Arnold von Glauburg, and Hamman von Holzhausen warmly welcomed him. They engaged in enthusiastic discussions with Luther, whose writings were already familiar to them, until late at night.

During his visit, Luther also paid a visit to the municipal Latin school, which had been founded in 1519 for the education of the patricians' sons. The school was situated across his inn, in a building called Haus Goldstein. The founder, Mayor Hamman von Holzhausen, appointed the humanist Wilhelm Nesen as the first rector. Luther also met Nesen during his visit, who followed him to Wittenberg in 1523. A letter from Luther to his friend Spalatin, written from Frankfurt, has been preserved, in which he describes the physical hardships of his journey and continues: "But Christ lives! and we want to come to Worms to all the gates of hell and princes of the air for protection...I have not wanted to write any other letters until I see for myself what to do: that we do not inflate Satan, whom we are rather willing to frighten and despise."

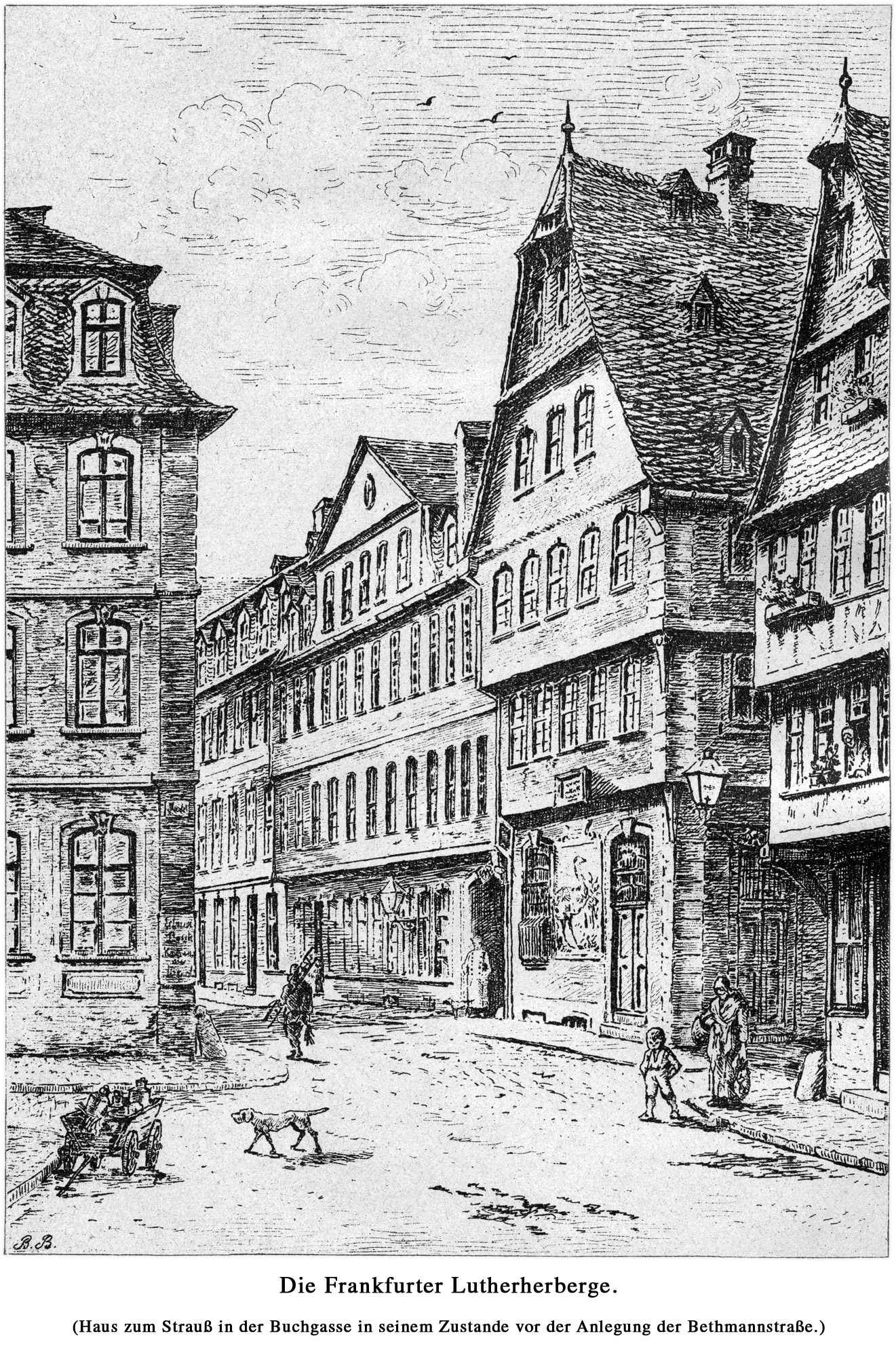
Gasthof zum Strauss, drawing around 1850

On this return from Worms, Luther once again stayed at the Strauß Inn. His visit once again became a public event. The next morning, Luther wrote a letter to Lucas Cranach, hinting at his seclusion at Wartburg, stating, "I let myself be shut up and hidden, not yet knowing myself where...There must be a little time of silence and suffering: a little yet see me not, and yet a little, yet see me, saith Christ." At 10 o'clock he departed for Friedberg.

In 1530, the printer Christian Egenolff from Hadamar settled in Frankfurt and opened his store on Großer Kornmarkt near Buchgasse. His print shop produced the first German Bible printed in Frankfurt in 1535, and he also printed Faber's Siege Plan of 1552.

The booksellers and publishers in the Buchgasse owned 20 cellar vaults where books, engravings, and fair catalogs were sold. Noteworthy sellers included Dürer's wife Agnes and Maria Sibylla Merian. In 1682, a flood on the Main River inundated the booksellers' vaults, causing significant damage to the goods stored there.

The English world traveler Thomas Coryat visited the Frankfurt Fair in 1608. He wrote:

"In the Buchgasse I saw such an infinite number of books that I admired them immensely. This road surpasses anything else I have ever seen in my travels. It struck me as a true epitome of all the most important libraries in Europe."

— Thomas Coryat

After the Thirty Years' War, the intellectual center of Germany shifted from the imperial cities on the Rhine to the absolutist states in the north and east, causing the book trade to gradually migrate there, especially to Leipzig. The Frankfurt book fair lost its leading role and eventually ceased to exist altogether after 1750.

== The Kornmarkt in classicist Frankfurt ==
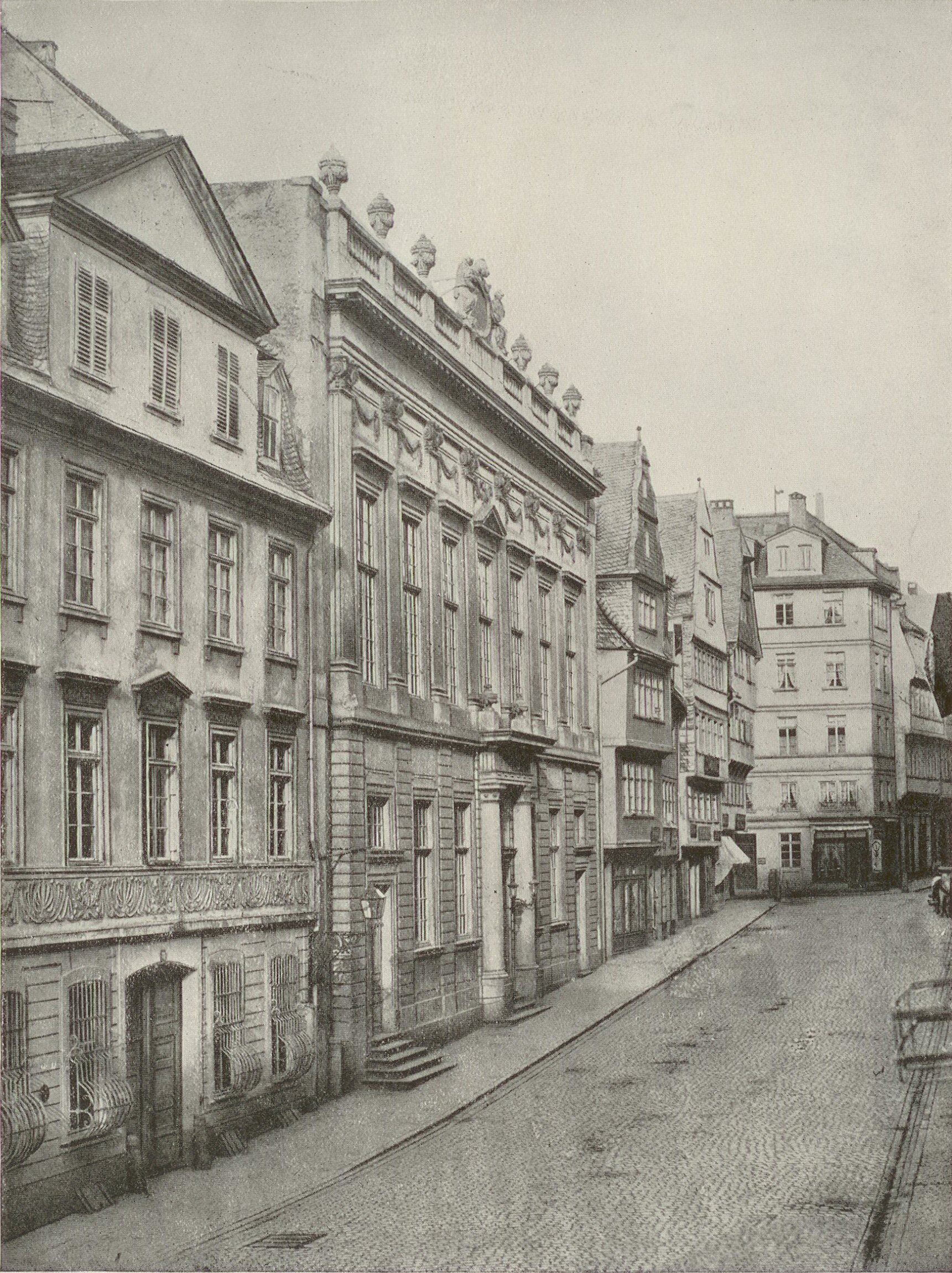
German Reformed Church at Kornmarkt (1793–1944)

Even after the end of the international book trade and the shift of the city center from the Altstadt to the Neustadt, the Kornmarkt remained a residential area of the upper class. The house Zum Großen Korb, built in the 18th century, was considered one of the most beautiful buildings on the street. In 1788, the Große Stalburg was sold to the German Reformed congregation, which subsequently demolished it the following year to make way for their new church, built by Georg Friedrich Mack and Salins de Montfort.

The neighboring house Liebeneck (Großer Kornmarkt 15) was occupied by the Schönemann banking family, whose daughter Lili engaged with Johann Wolfgang Goethe in 1775, who grew up a few streets away. On Große Sandgasse, a street branching off from Kornmarkt, stood the house Zum Goldenen Kopf, since 1777 the residence of the Brentano family, Bettina's birthplace, and the house where her mother Maximiliane died. In the neighboring house was the Naumann'sche Druckerei, responsible for producing the stamps for the Thurn and Taxis Post Office.

In the 19th century, the Bethmann banking family, renowned alongside the Rothschilds as one of the most influential banking dynasties in Frankfurt, constructed their prestigious main bank building on the corner of Schöppengasse and Buchgasse.

Between 6 November 1848, and 9 January 1849, the Frankfurt National Assembly took up residence in the German Reformed Church. During this time, the Paulskirche, their designated meeting place, was undergoing renovation. The Kornmarkt thus became the venue for 40 sessions of the first freely elected German parliament.

During the Free City period, the building at Großer Kornmarkt 12, located opposite the Reformed Church, served as the seat of the city-state's Court of Appeal.

== Gründerzeit remodeling ==
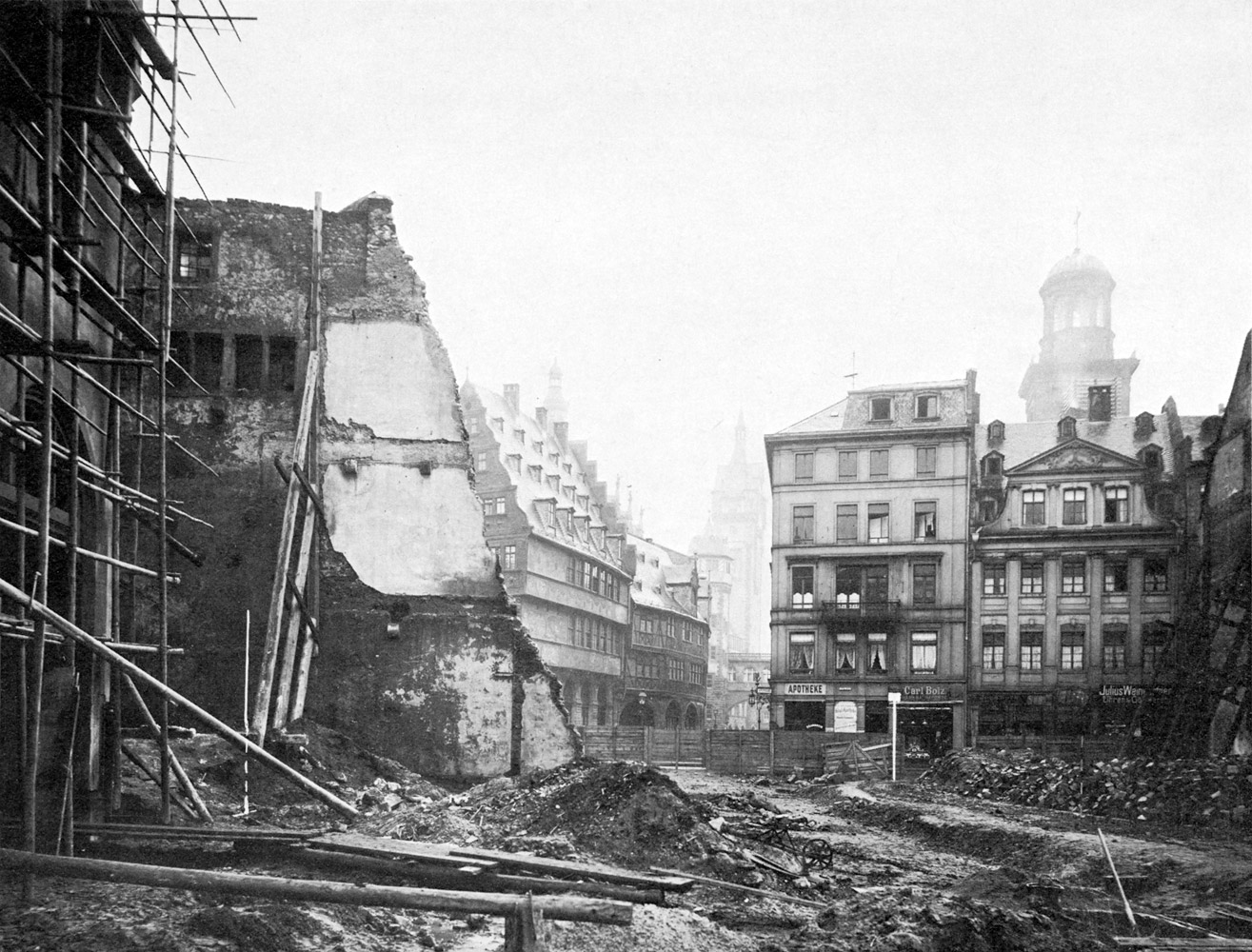
Construction of the Bethmannstrasse/Braubachstrasse road breakthrough, 1904

Towards the mid-19th century, Frankfurt experienced significant urban development. Despite a late start in industrialization, the city’s population grew rapidly, and the built-up area expanded beyond the city boundary of the ramparts. The soft areas of the old town, once characterized by gardens, arterial roads, and country houses, were quickly covered by urbanization. To accommodate the growing city, large infrastructure projects were undertaken. However, these developments largely bypassed the old town, which became increasingly isolated from modern urban development and took on a distinct character of its own. The exodus of wealthy citizens to more contemporary parts of the city raised concerns that the old town could deteriorate into a slum.

To address this danger, under the leadership of Lord Mayor Franz Adickes, the municipal government initiated a major project in the mid-1890s. The aim was to connect the old town with the rapid development of the Gründerzeit city. A wide street was planned to cut through the entire old town from east to west, creating a road breakthrough. The intent was to use representative architecture as a catalyst for further redevelopment of the old town. Additionally, the tramway, which had already been running since 1872, would finally connect to the old town through the new traffic route.

Construction of the new road began from the west. Many houses in the old town fell victim to this project, including historically significant buildings such as the Nürnberger Hof and the Rebstock Hof on the market square. In Buchgasse, the houses Zum Goldstein and the Baseler Hof were also demolished. Cross streets like Schöppen-, Pauls-, Römer- or Kälbergasse even disappeared completely from the Frankfurt city map. The new street, named Bethmannstraße, roughly followed the course of the previous Schöppengasse and Paulsgasse. Along Bethmannstraße, the imposing buildings of the new city hall were built between 1900 and 1908, designed by architects Franz von Hoven and Ludwig Neher. These buildings, located on the east side of Kornmarkt and Buchgasse, were crowned by the two city hall towers Langer Franz and Kleiner Kohn on Buchgasse.

The tramway in Bethmannstraße began operation on 1 May 1899, and was given a stop at the corner of Kornmarkt.

== Destruction and reconstruction ==
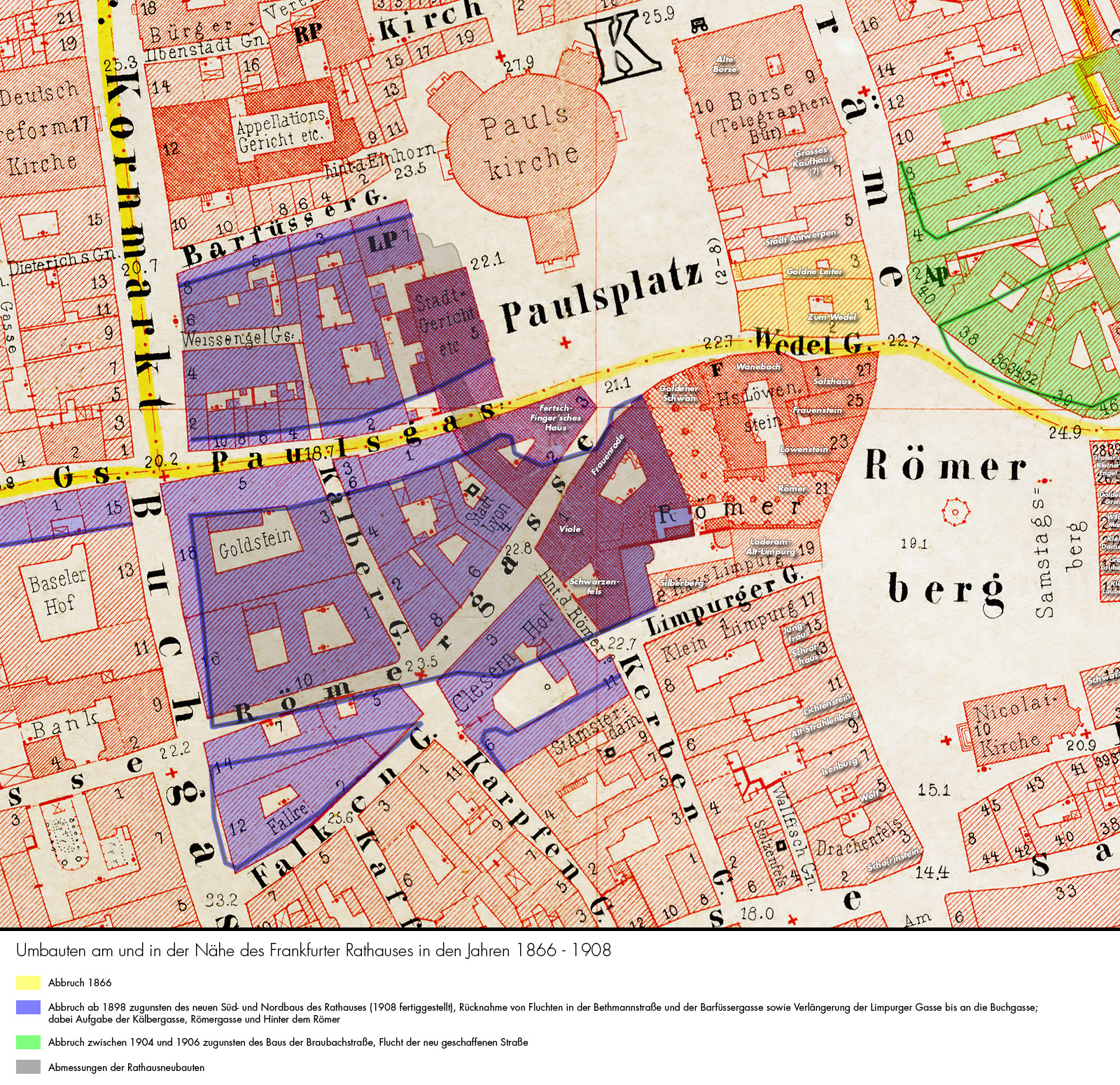
Redesign of the Kornmarkt/Paulsplatz area with the new town hall building from 1898

During World War II, the western part of Frankfurt's Old Town, including Kornmarkt and Buchgasse, suffered severe destruction due to multiple air raids. One of the most devastating attacks occurred on the evening of 22 March 1944, which is known as the “extermination raid.” At Kornmarkt, 80 people were trapped and buried in cellars. Rescue workers tirelessly dug a tunnel to reach those trapped. However, before the rescue could be completed, another major attack took place on 24 March. The remaining residents sought shelter in the rescue tunnel, but it was struck directly by an aerial mine. As a result, a total of 129 people lost their lives, including the 80 individuals who had been buried two days earlier.

The entire development of the Kornmarkt was severely impacted by the demolition and incendiary bomb, leading to a devastating firestorm. Most of the structures, apart from the roof elements, were destroyed. However, two blocks of the new city hall and the badly damaged outer walls of the Bethmann Bank managed to survive the onslaught.

== Kornmarkt and Buchgasse today ==
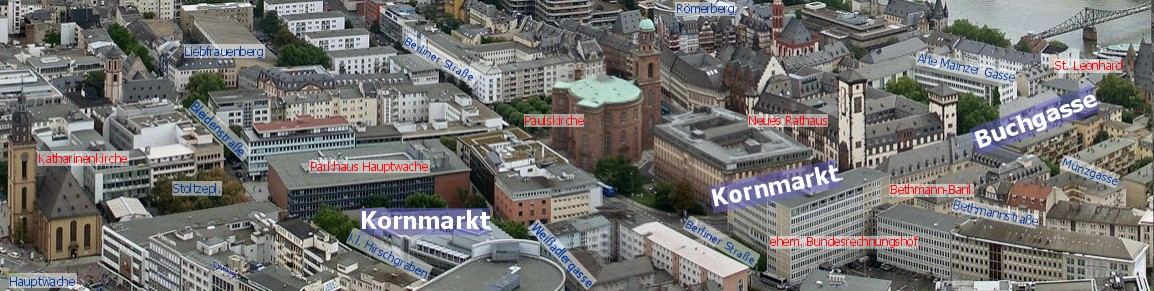
Mk Frankfurt Kornmarkt overview

=== Overview ===
The reconstruction of Kornmarkt in the early 1950s followed a radically modern approach, departing from the previous small-scale division, and uniform street lines were completely abandoned. As a result, the street lost its coherent appearance, and today it resembles a collection of fragmented urban remnants. In terms of traffic and functionality, Kornmarkt has significantly diminished in importance and is now relatively unknown compared to the main streets of Zeil.

Furthermore, the construction of the six-lane Berliner Strasse, intersecting with Kornmarkt, further contributed to the loss of the historic streetscape. Not only did it destroy the existing building fabric but also disrupted the recognizable urban structure.

As a consequence, Berliner Straße divides today’s Kornmarkt into two distinct areas that are no longer perceived as a coherent street. The northern part, as the location of city-famous retail stores, is part of the shopping district around Hauptwache. Meanwhile, the southern section, characterized by administrative and residential buildings, remains part of the old town and excludes a quieter atmosphere.

=== North of Berliner Straße ===
Since 1956, the northern end of the Kornmarkt has been occupied by the Kaufhalle department store (designed by Richard Heil), which occupies the entire west side of Katharinenpforte from Hauptwache to Kleiner Hirschgraben. Until the end of 2020, this building housed a branch of Saks Fifth Avenue.

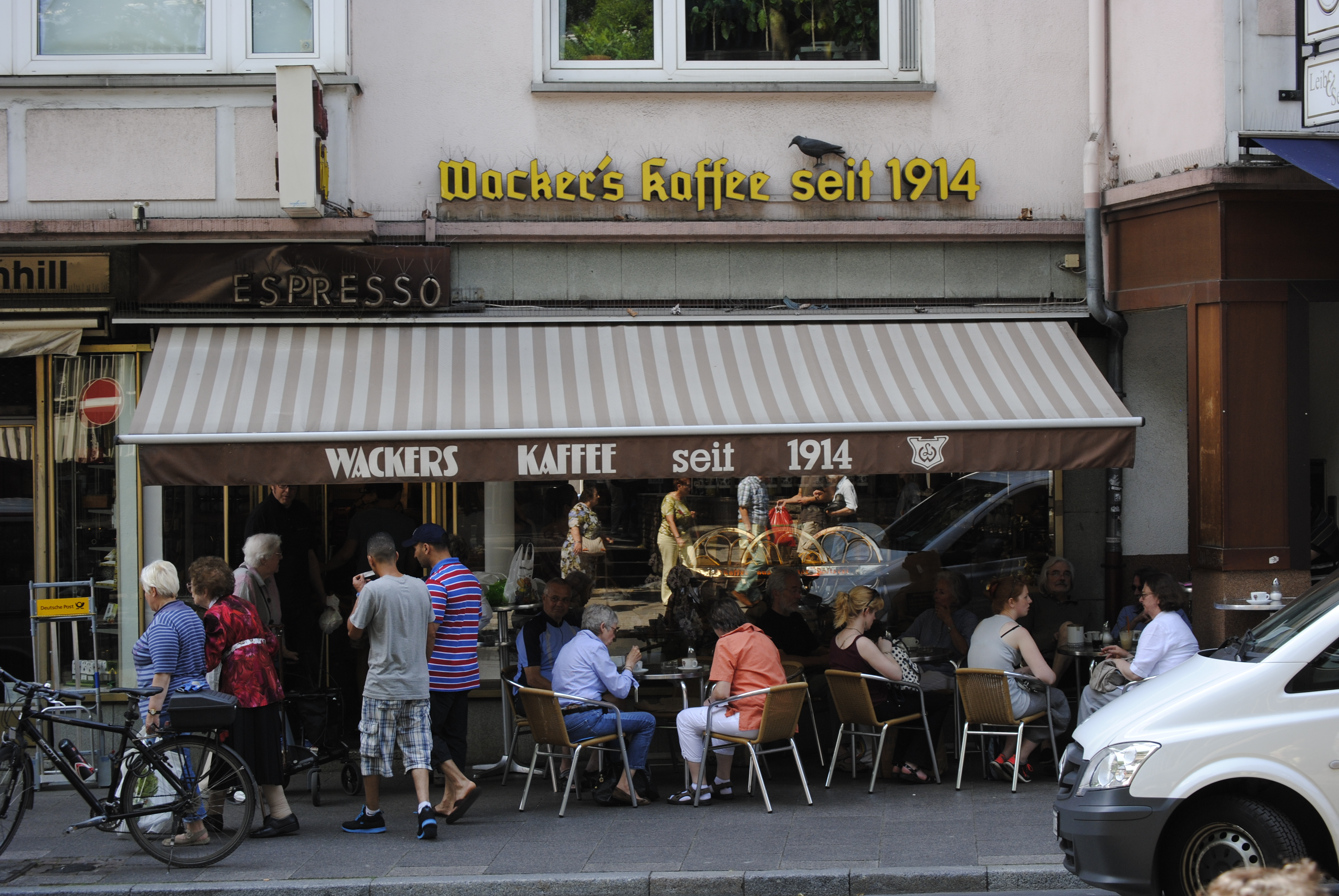
Wacker's coffee at Kornmarkt

Adjacent to the Kaufhalle department store is the Hauptwache parking garage (Kornmarkt 10). It occupies the entire eastern side of the street between Bleidenstraße and the alley connecting to Sandgasse over a length of around 75 meters. The Kornmarkt roadway diagonally crosses the irregular square forecourt of the parking garage, which now occupies the former street space. The entrance and exit of the parking garage branch off to the east. The remaining areas not used for car traffic are residual spaces with limited practical use.

The Hauptwache parking garage, inaugurated on 18 September 1956, was Frankfurt's first parking garage and one of the first of its kind in Europe. It was built with a reinforced concrete skeleton and features a combination of glass and clinker slabs. When it opened, it offered parking spaces for 430 vehicles, the garage was designed by architects Max Meid and Helmut Romeick, and it was commissioned by the city-owned Frankfurter Aufbau-Aktiengesellschaft. The opening ceremony was led by Lord Mayor Walter Kolb, who died two days later. In 1986, the parking garage was listed as a historical monument and subsequently underwent renovation.

Restaurants and stores are located on the first floor of the parking garage.

On the opposite side of the street, between Kleinem Hirschgraben and Weißadlergasse, stands a three-part structure that is not parallel to the parking garage but rather spans a trapezoidal area. Located at Kornmarkt 9 is the renowned coffee shop Wackers Kaffee, founded in 1914, which includes its own roastery and coffee house- a well-known establishment in the city.

Between Weißadlergasse and Berliner Straße, there are two buildings on each side of the street. In the corner building at (Kornmarkt 3), separated from the four-lane traffic of Kornmarkt by arcades, the bookstore at Paulskirche Erich Richter can be found.

=== South of Berliner Straße ===
The first section of the southern street of the wide turning point in Berliner Straße is called Kornmarkt. The name only changes one crossing further south at the much narrower Bethmanstraße to Buchgasse. Today, only two buildings remain in this section: on the east side, the north building of Frankfurt City Hall (1900–08), which extends to Paulsplatz, and on the west side, the eight-story high-rise building of the Federal Audit Office in Frankfurt am Main (architects Werner Dierschke and Friedel Steinmeyer, 1951–53). The listed part of the building was extensively renovated from 2015 to 2018 as part of the Kornmarkt Arkaden project and now serves as an office building.

Despite its minor traffic importance, the intersection with Bethmannstraße is primarily dedicated to automobile traffic. The main flow directs traffic from west to north, with the remaining space being occupied by restricted areas and traffic islands. Tramlines 11 and 12 cross the intersection without stopping.

Beyond the crossing begins Buchgasse. On the western side of the street stands the preserved main building of the Bethmann Bank, while on the eastern side is the new city hall, featuring incompletely rebuilt city hall towers Langer Franz and Kleiner Cohn after war damage.

South of the intersection with Münzgasse (west) and Limpurgergasse (east), row housing buildings from the 1950s show little regard for their location in the heart of a historic European city center. These buildings even have front gardens reminiscent of post-war suburban housing estates.

Since the reconstruction, there is little on-site to remind visitors of the former international importance of Buchgasse. In an architecturally unremarkable manner, Buchgasse leads into Leonhardskirchhof, the forecourt of Leonhardskirche. The corner house at Alte Mainzer Gasse (Buchgasse 2), formerly a rector, served as a branch of the Sion Sisters from [R1] 1968 to 2007. The old people's home, Haus Leonhard, was demolished in 2005 and replaced by Lebenshaus St. Leonhard, operated by the Caritasverband since 2011.

In 2007, a proposal was made in the city council to commemorate the winners of the Peace Prize of the German Book Trade with a kind of "Walk of Fame" from the Paulskirche to the Buchgasse. The Buchgasse is also part of the Parade of Cultures route and is home to the Buchgassenfest, which is organized by the Literature Society of Hesse in the courtyard and bistro of Lebenshaus St. Leonhard.

== See also ==
- Bundesrechnungshof (Federal Court of Audit)
