= Roseneck (Frankfurt am Main) =

Former building in Germany

Coordinates: 50°06′37″N 8°41′10″E

View from the Weckmarkt, around 1900

The Roseneck was a group of half-timbered houses in Frankfurt am Main. The small square was a tourist attraction and, alongside the Five-Finger Square, was one of the most popular postcard motifs in the picturesque old town (altstadt) of Frankfurt. The Roseneck was destroyed in the air raids on Frankfurt in 1944. When it was rebuilt in 1952, the properties and alleys of the ensemble were redesigned with simple residential and commercial buildings.

== Location ==
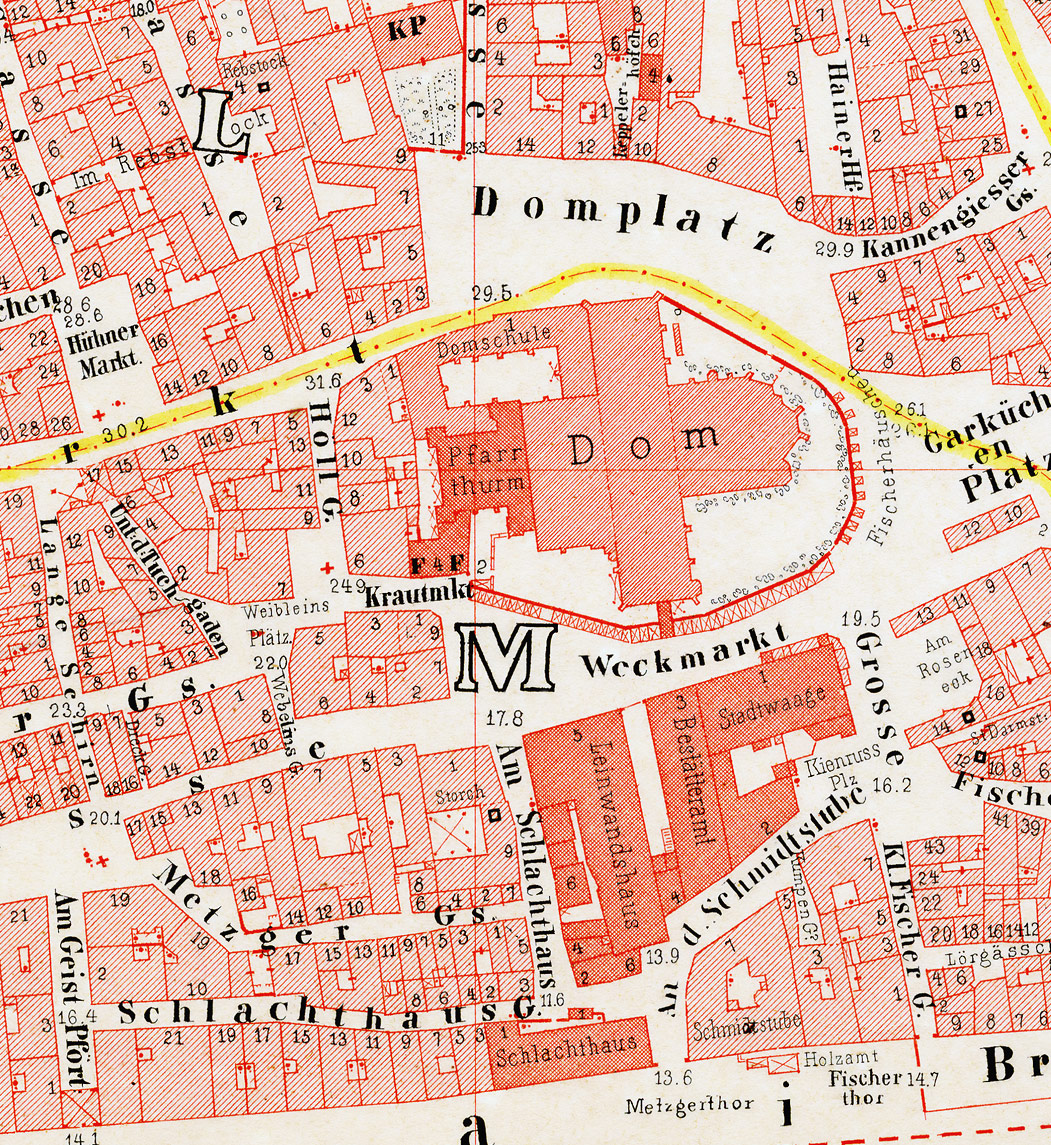
The Roseneck, centre right in 1861

The Roseneck platz was a small square south of St. Bartholomew's imperial cathedral. It was on the east side of a small street named Große Fischergasse, which branched off to the south between Garküchenplatz in the east and Weckmarkt in the west as can be seen on the 1861 map. To the west of the Roseneck was the Stadtwaage, which was demolished in 1873 and replaced by a neo-Gothic building housing the city archives. On the southern edge of the square, Große Fischergasse bent east.

== History ==
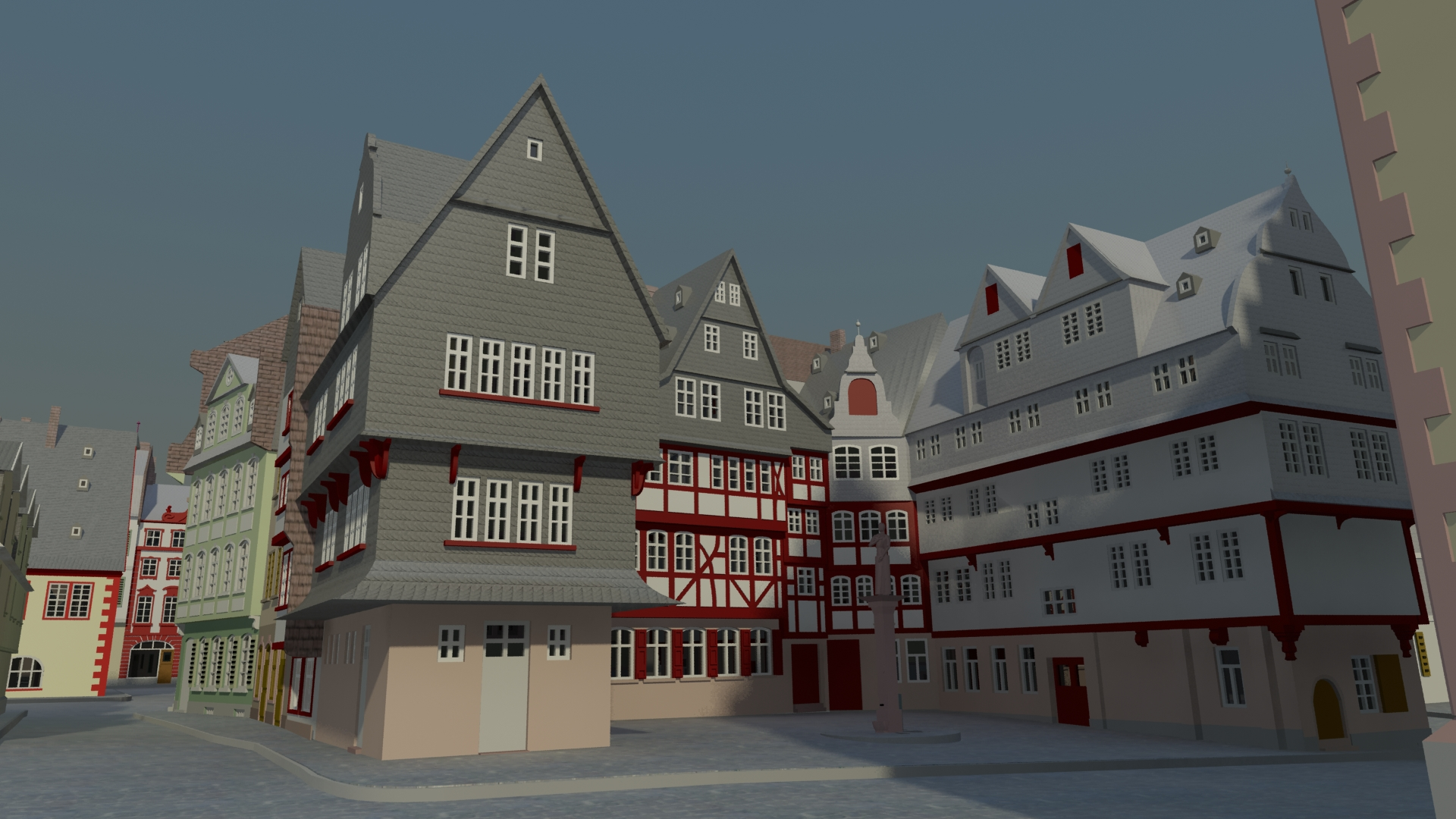
The Roseneck in the virtual old town model by Jörg Ott

The Roseneck was in the first Jewish residential area. After the small Jewish community, consisting of around 60 people, fell victim to the pogrom of 1349, the city council confiscated the properties and gave them to new owners. The Lörhof or Curia Cerdonum was built on the square at the Roseneck, a courtyard consisting of several buildings that could be closed by gates to the surrounding streets. The courtyard belonged to the Lohgerber guild, but soon was sold to private individuals. The courtyard was later divided and compacted by several small houses. In the first half of the 16th century, the council had some of the houses demolished to make more living space for everyone. Thus, the Roseneck square was created.

The houses corresponded to typical Frankfurt construction with a ground floor made of sandstone and two to three half-timbered upper floors, whose overhangs were supported by decorated sandstone cantilever stones. The steep gable roofs carried one or more dwarf houses with pointed gables or wave gables. The facades of the houses were originally slated or plastered. The houses were already used for gastronomy in the 19th century. In 1902 the facade of one of the houses was painted in the folk style. The wall paintings disappeared again when, in the course of the restoration of the old town, the houses were renovated in 1929 with the half-timbering partially exposed.

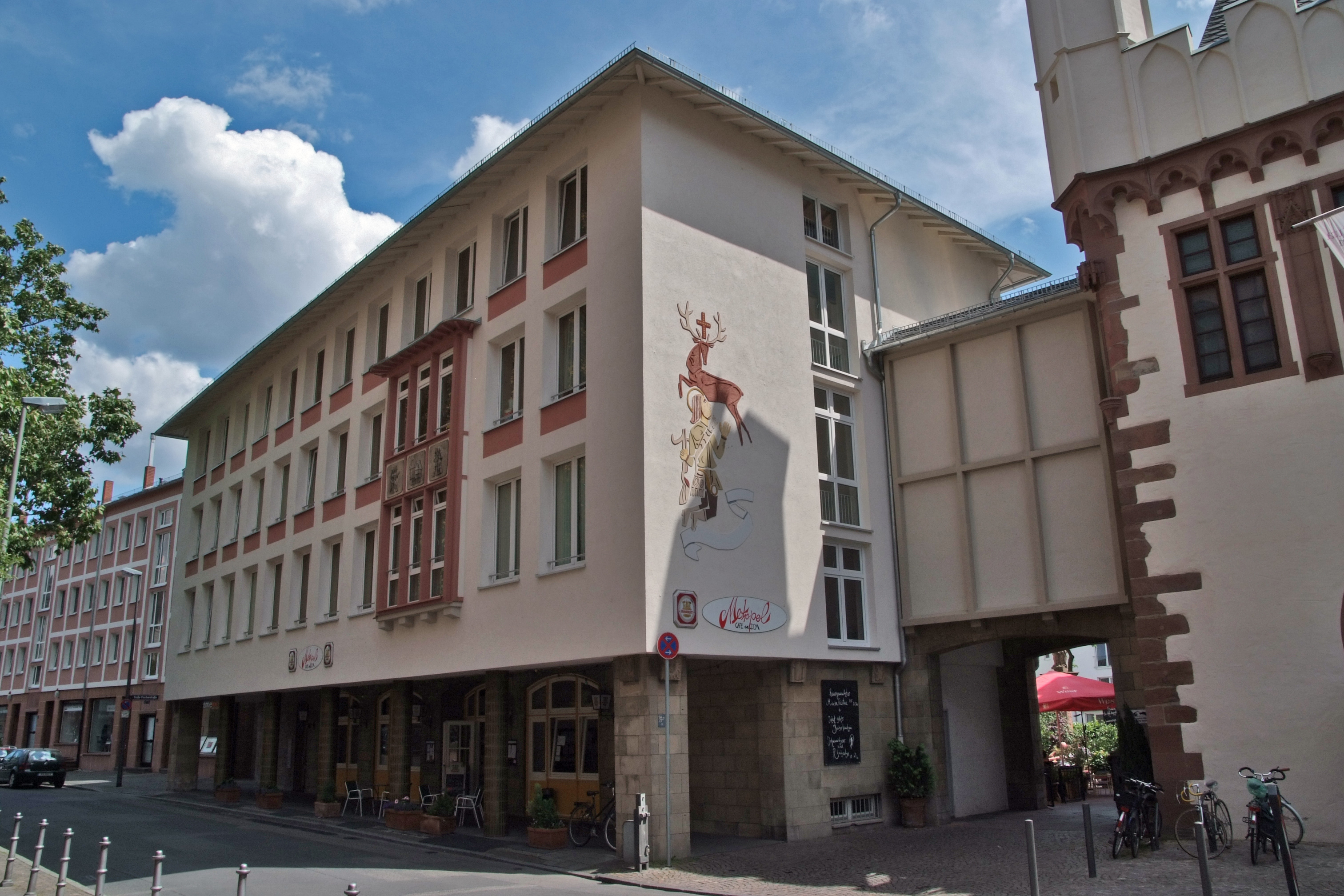
Today's block edge development. The house in the background is on the former Roseneck

== Destruction ==
After the first serious damage in an air raid on January 29, 1944, the half-timbered houses in the attack on March 18 and 22, 1944 burned out completely. After the war, the debris was removed from the 1950s. Rebuilding began in 1952, when the old plots and streets were completely changed. Today nothing resembles the Roseneck in the cityscape. In addition to old photographs, films and paintings, Treuner's old town model and the virtual old town model by Jörg Ott preserve the memory of the Roseneck.

== Literature ==
- Johann Georg Battonn: Local Description of the City of Frankfurt am Main – Volume III. Association for History and Antiquity Studies in Frankfurt am Main, Frankfurt am Main 1863, pp. 340–341 (Digital link)
- Johann Georg Battonn: Local Description of the City of Frankfurt am Main – Volume IV. Association for History and Ancient History of Frankfurt am Main, Frankfurt am Main 1864, pp. 9–10 (Digital link)
- Heinrich Voelcker, the old town in Frankfurt am Main within the Hohenstaufen Wall. Frankfurt am Main 1937, Moritz Diesterweg publishing house
- Georg Hartmann, Fried Lübbecke: Old Frankfurt. A legacy. Verlag Sauer and Auvermann, Glashütten 1971
- Hartwig Beseler, Niels Gutschow: The fate of war in German architecture – losses, damage, reconstruction. Karl Wachholtz Verlag, Neumünster 1988, ISBN 3-529-02685-9
- Wolfgang Klötzer: A guest in old Frankfurt. Hugendubel, Munich 1990, ISBN 3-88034-493-0, pp. 52–55
