= Berliner Straße (Frankfurt am Main) =

Thoroughfare in Frankfurt, Germany

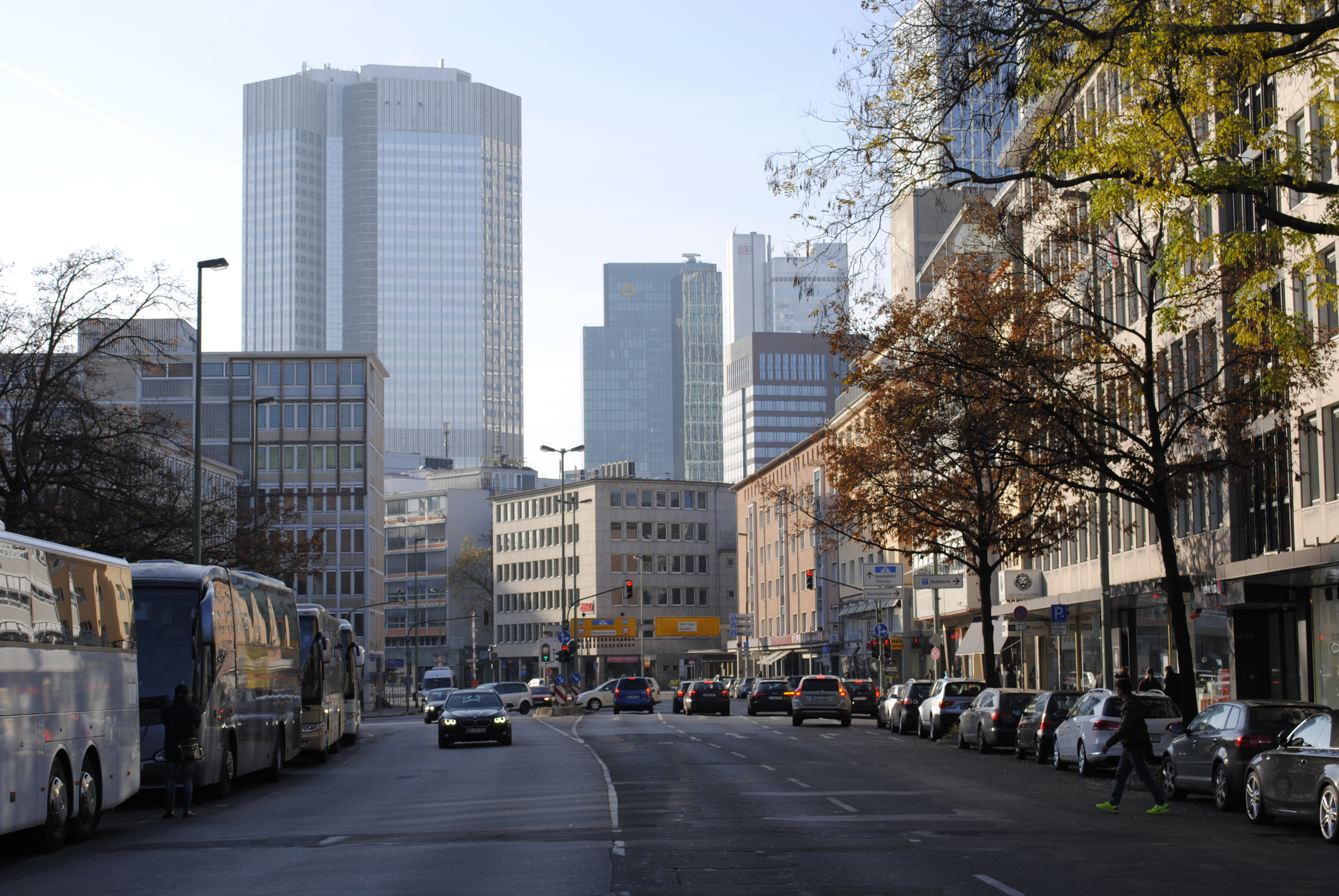
- Interactive map of Berliner Straße
- Former name: Schnurgasse
- Location: Mitte/Paulskirche
- Nearest metro station: Dom/Römer
- Coordinates: 50°06′42″N 8°40′56″E
- West end: Theatertunnel
- Major junctions: Kornmarkt, Paulsplatz (Neue Kräme), Domstraße-Hasengasse
- East end: Börneplatz

Construction
- Construction start: 1952
- Inauguration: 16 November 1953

Berliner Straße is a major street in the city centre of Frankfurt am Main. It was built after the Bombing of Frankfurt am Main in World War II along the route of the old Schnurgasse.

== History ==
The Berliner Strasse was built from 1952 onwards as part of the modern redevelopment of Frankfurt's Old Town, which was largely destroyed in the air raids on Frankfurt am Main during World War II. The aim of the road construction was to ensure that the new residential buildings that were being built there would be accessible for cars. This was the second major road breakthrough in the area of the Old Town, after the Braubachstrasse, which was located further south, had already been built between 1904 and 1908.

The street follows the former Schnurgasse in the eastern section, but was built many times wider than the previously existing narrow Altstadtgasse. The part to the west of the Neue Kräme, on the other hand, was laid out without taking the previous street plan into account.

The street was inaugurated on 16 November 1953, after a construction period of about 15 months. Initially called Straße an der Paulskirche, it was renamed Berliner Straße in 1955. The last major change to Berliner Strasse took place in 1974 with the opening of the Theater Tunnel, for whose connection a long ramp was built at the western end of the street.
