= Lichtenstein House =

Historical building in Frankfurt

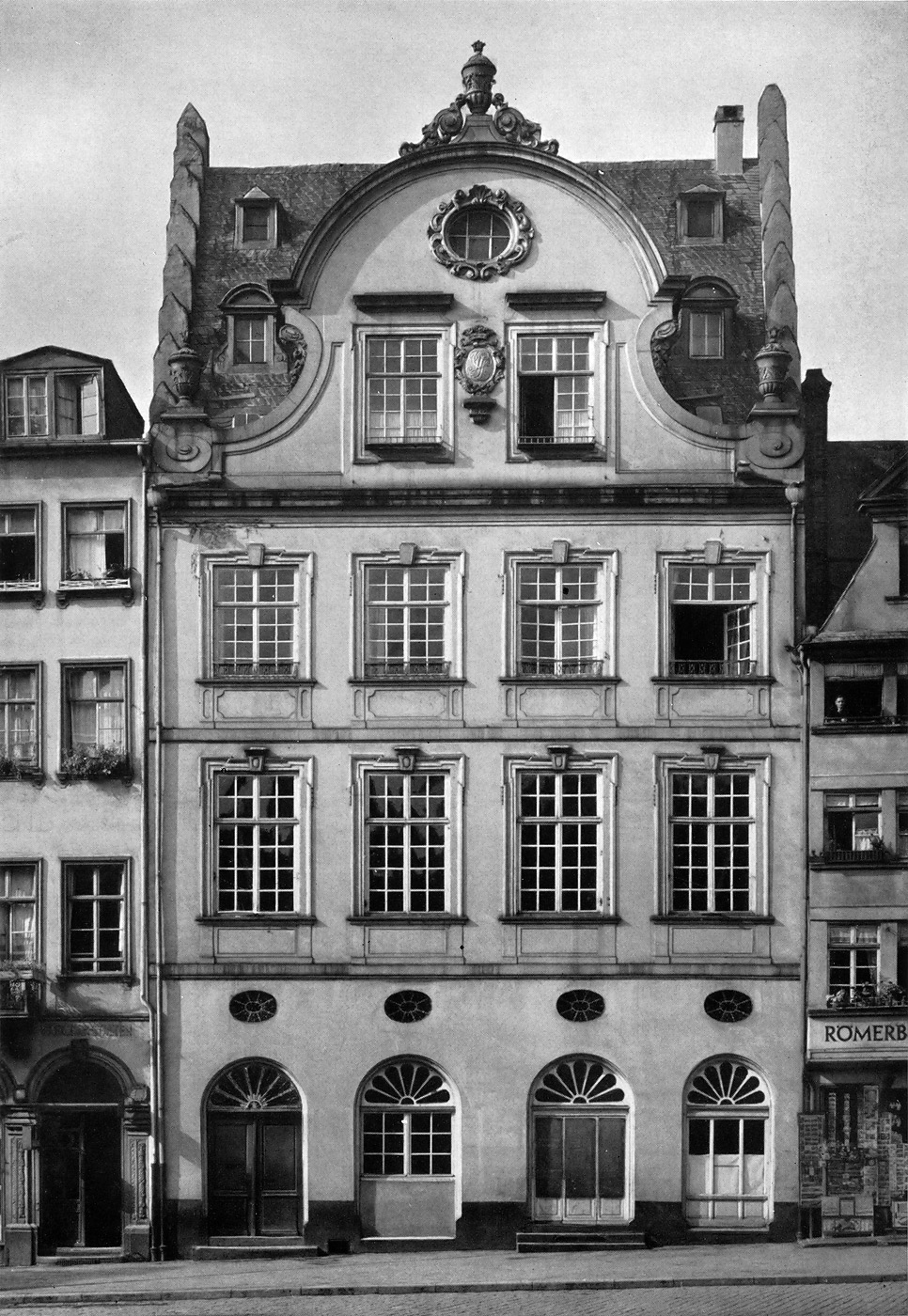
Lichtenstein House, photo by C. Abt, c. 1910

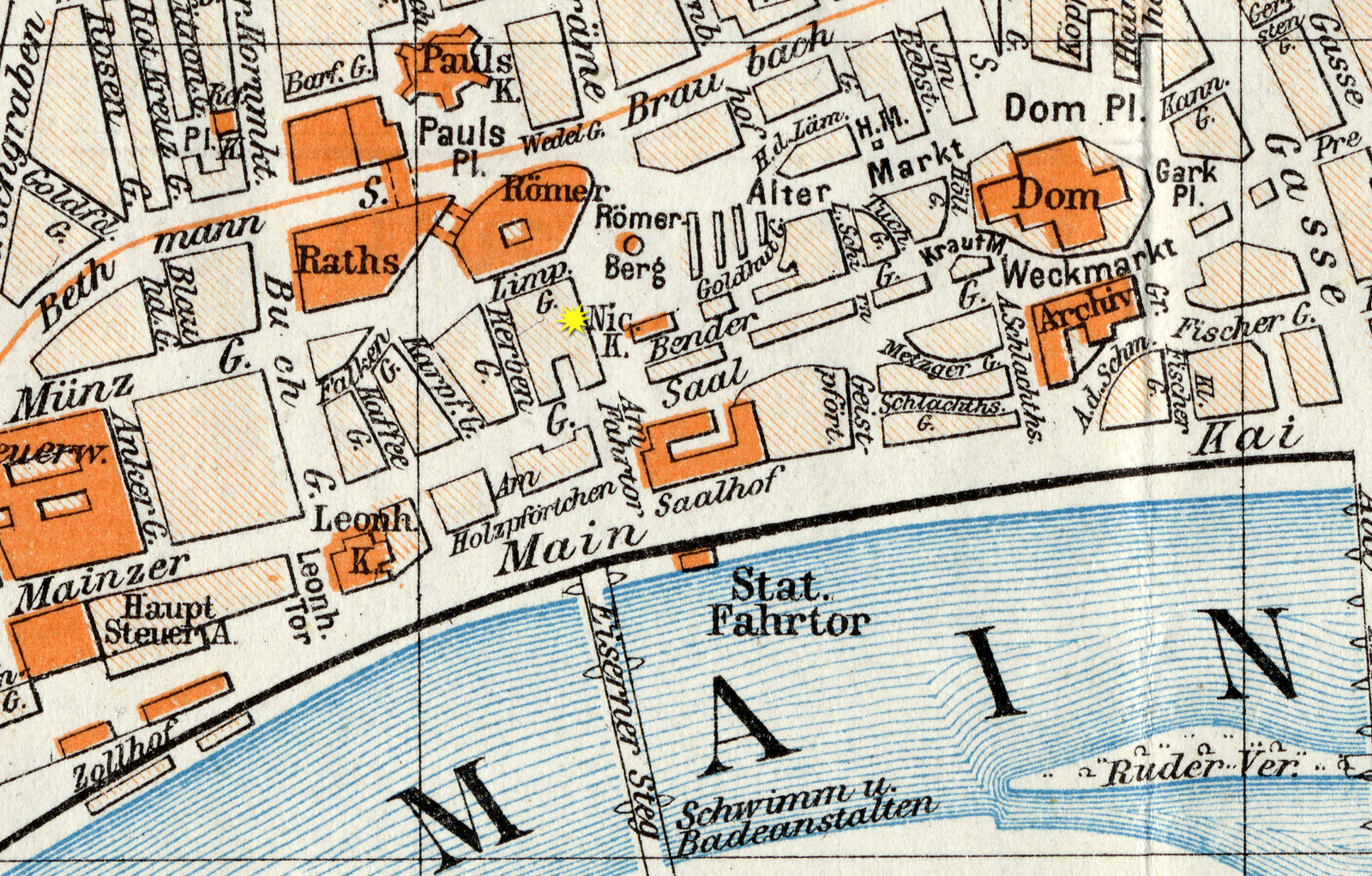
Position of the building in Frankfurt's Altstadt

Lichtenstein House, frequently called just Lichtenstein or Little Roman, was a historical building in the Altstadt of Frankfurt am Main and has an interesting architectural history, which combines the Gothic and the Baroque style. It was located in a residential block of the Römerberg (lit. 'Roman Mountain'), south of a building called Römer (lit. 'Roman'). The address was Römerberg 11.

While it was a popular trade fair in the Middle Ages, it became known as a treasured lookout and a venue of the European court societies in celebration of the coronations of Roman-German kings and emperors which took place at the Römerberg in the Early Modern Age. In the first half of the 20th century, Lichtenstein was one of the hubs of the art scene in Frankfurt.

In March 1944, the Lichtenstein House was nearly completely consumed by fire after the bombing of Frankfurt by the Allies of World War II. However, the mostly intact enclosing walls were not demolished until 1946 by a storm. Shortly afterwards, the building was rebuilt in a modern aesthetic, so that it now has to be considered among the lost historic monuments of Frankfurt's Altstadt.

== History ==
=== From the Time of Origin to the Baroque Renovation (1326–1725) ===
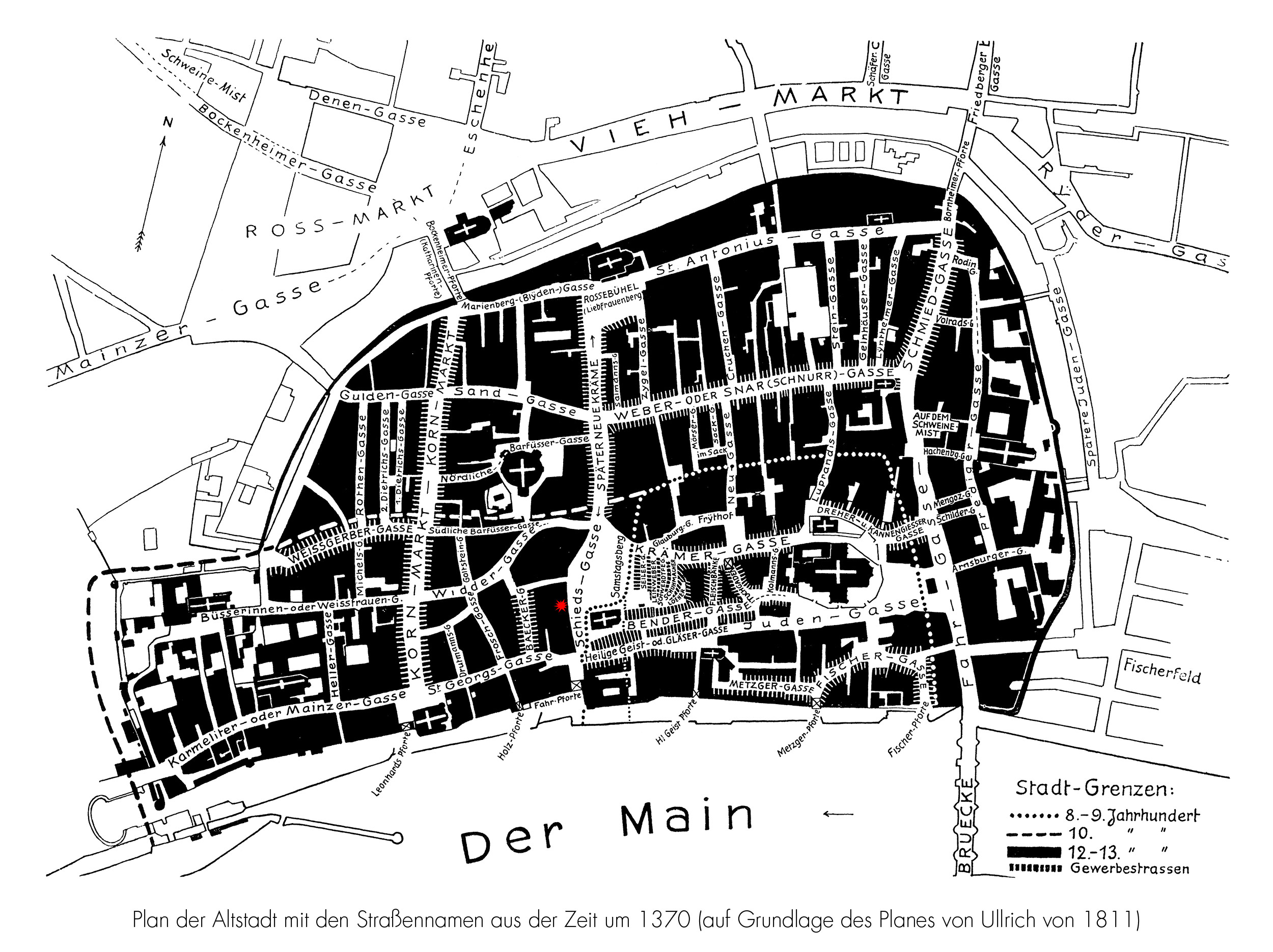
Map of the Altstadt with Lichtenstein House, around 1370

The Lichtenstein House was first mentioned in two official certificates in 1326. Moreover, according to the respective fascicle of the Institute for Municipal History, at that time the house was labelled as the parent house of a patrician family called Schurge zu Lichtenstein. However, a statement from this period describing what the house looked like does not seem to exist. As a matter of fact, specific information from the time the building was built is entirely missing. Still, the early architectural history can approximately be reconstructed due to analogies, as the house, which can be verified to have been a Gothic stone house at its core, is part of roughly twenty buildings in Frankfurt which belong to the same type and resemble each other tremendously.

The core of the Altstadt (including the Römerberg) was already so populous around 1150 that the first city expansion became necessary. The stone buildings of the nearby Roman complex were first mentioned in the early 14th century. It is probable that the construction of the core of Lichtenstein House was also done during that time. One look at the size of the lot in comparison to the surrounding lots of the Schrothaus (address: Römerberg 15) and Jungfrau (address: Römerberg 15) Houses furthermore suggests that the building was established on two lots of previous constructions that were combined for this new construction. Such an approach is in fact documented regarding another Gothic stone building – the Stone House (German: Steinerne Haus) at the market.

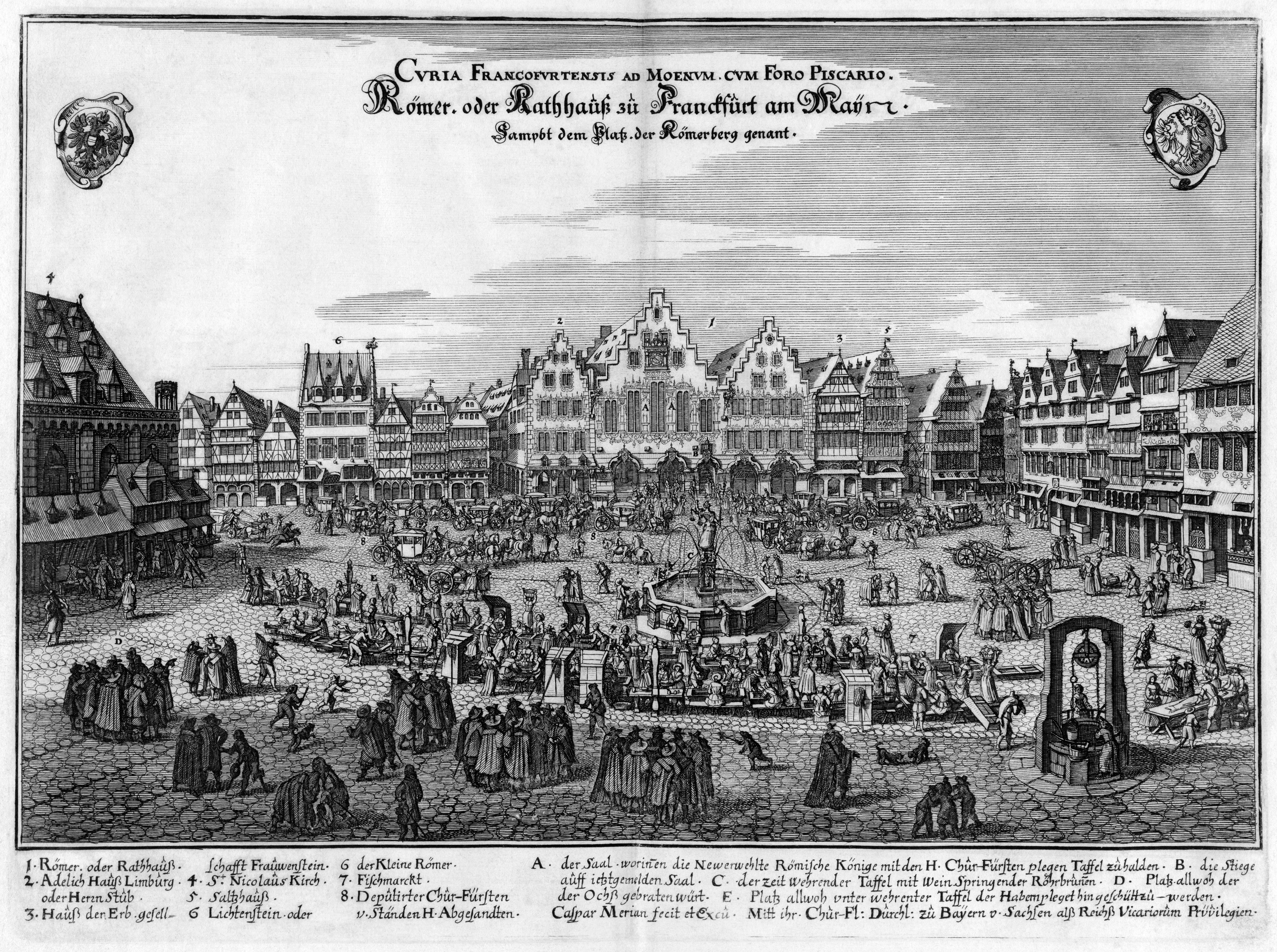
Lichtenstein House in the diary of Leopolds I., copper engraving by Caspar Merian, 1658

Nevertheless, on the one hand Walter Sage argues that the position of the eaves as well as the small roof towers (compare painting by Caspar Merian), which was not come across on buildings until the late Gothic period in Frankfurt, indicate that the new construction was built in the late 15th century. On the other hand, the art historian and connoisseur of the Altstadt of Frankfurt, Fried Lübbecke, proposed that the house was built in the 14th century. Both views can however easily be combined because a Lichtenstein House which was built in the early 14th century and had some parts of the roof altered while the remaining construction was kept is documented. Having said that, it remains uncertain whether the Schurge patrician family, who added the name of the house to their family name, as did some later owners of the house, or whether the slightly more famous Glauburg patrician family, who owned the Lichtenstein House as of 1460, constructed the building due to the records being incomplete.

The etymology of the name of the house should be located in a family name that was transferred onto the building as this is the case for a majority of houses in the Altstadt. The last name Lichtenstein appears numerous times in surviving certificates from the 14th century, even though there are variant spellings due to a lack of orthography back in the days. There is no evidence for a direct correlation between the Lichtenstein family and the eponymous house. Thus, it can only be speculated that the family owned the previous building structures, which were then purchased by the Schurge family for reconstruction in the early 14th century.

Notwithstanding the above, Lichtenstein was just like its constructional relatives (like Fürsteneck House, which was built on Fahrgasse street in 1362, or the already mentioned Stone House, constructed in 1464) and was above all characterised by the anticipatory choice of location by the building owner. Situated near the city gate, called Fahrtor, and through which trade articles were shipped across the Main to the city of Frankfurt, Lichtenstein House was a welcoming protection against the threatening firestorms of the timber framing constructions due to its fireproof vaults.

Even the municipal administration was afraid of the danger and stored all of the important documents and privileges in the 1808 dismantled vault of the tower of the fortress near the city gate Leonhardstor. It did so until the town hall near the Römerberg, which was purchased in 1405, was expanded in 1438 by a lithic archive tower.

The trade fair of Frankfurt, which was already extremely important in the 14th century, was closely linked to trade items. Tax accounting from this period shows that some homeowners earned more money by accommodating fair visitors than during the rest of the year. Lichtenstein House, however, might very well have attracted particularly wealthy fair goers because of the size of its rooms, which were very luxurious for the time. Hence, a document from the year 1474 explaining that a total of 48 spare beds were available in the entire house does not come as a surprise.

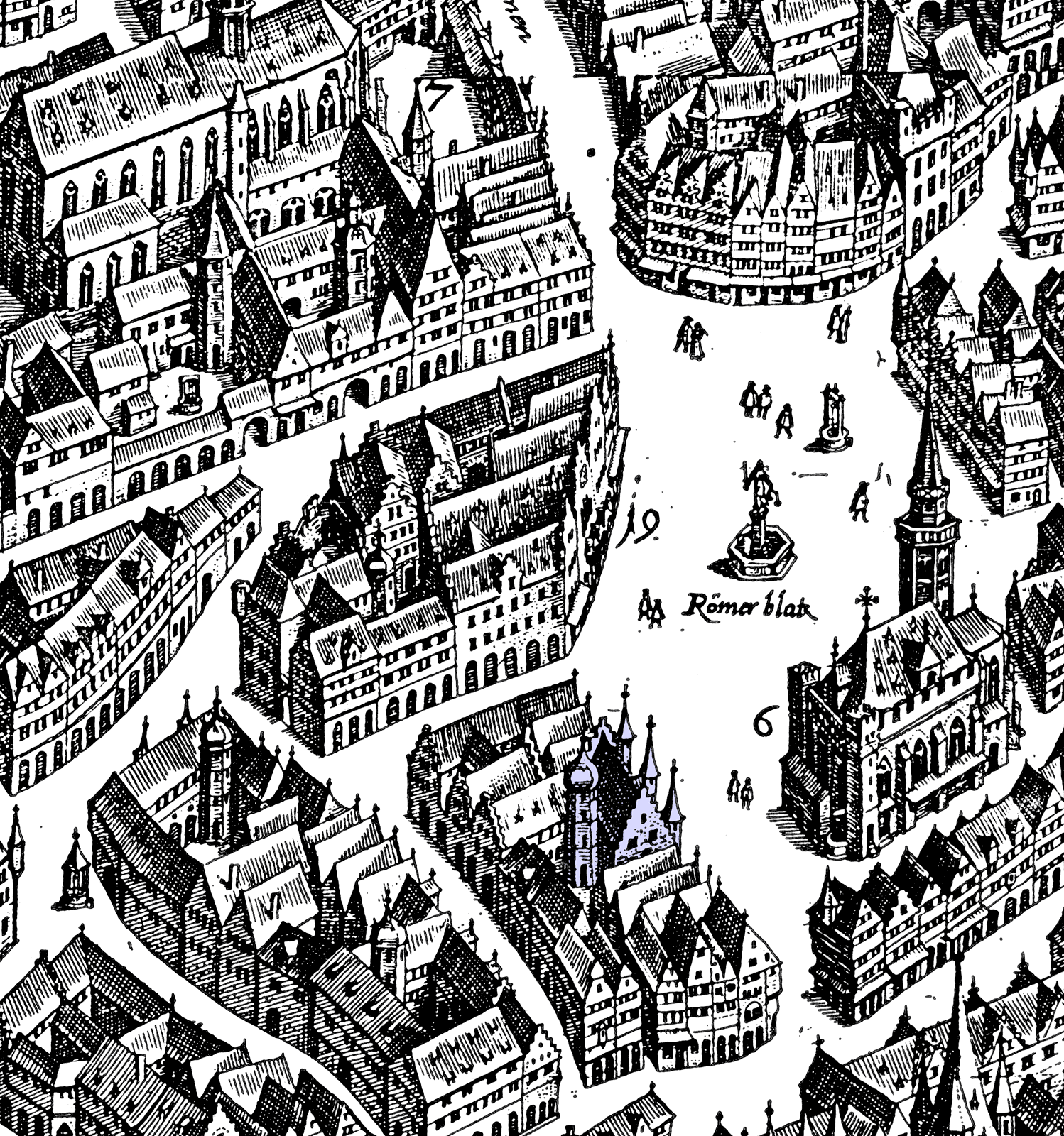
Buildings on Merian map of Frankfurt in 1628

During the Reformation movement, Johann von Glauburg, who was one of the most important political personalities of the 16th century in Frankfurt, lived in Lichtenstein House. In 1526, he went back to his hometown after his studies, where he became a juryman as early as 1532. Later on he was a long reigning mayor of Frankfurt and was a skilled diplomat.

As of 1562 Frankfurt became, apart from being the city of the election of the Holy Roman Emperor, also the city of the coronation of the Holy Roman Emperor. As result, Römerberg became the location where these regularly held ceremonies took place. Hence, the worth of the building was probably multiplied again. The well positioned window seats that were made available for rent during these celebrations brought the respective owner significant revenues, similar to the aforementioned possibility to accommodate fair visitors. Although exact numbers for Lichtenstein House concerning this matter have not been preserved, analogies can be drawn once again between Lichtenstein and other buildings in similar conditions. The fact that the enormous amount of windows in most of the buildings facing the Römerberg can only be explained in terms of the high window rent that can be achieved can serve as further confirmation.

Soon after a courtyard was probably constructed. It reached west of the Lichtenstein House to the Kerbengasse and its late Gothic remains with the emblem of the Glauburg family were captured in some drafts by Carl Theodor Reiffenstein in the middle of the 19th century. Regarding its unadorned useful qualities, the courtyard probably served for the longest time more as a camp than as a dwelling place and also disposed of a highly spacious vaulted cellar, that was used without exception by all of the owners of the Lichtenstein House to stock wine.

On the famous bird's eye view map by Matthäus Merian, which shows Frankfurt in the year 1628, the rear of the house is depicted in detail for the first time. According to this map, there was a distinctive stair tower in the courtyard which was added to the back and was positioned between Lichtenstein House and the rear house of the Kerbengasse. This stair tower belonged to the late Gothic period as well as to Early Renaissance from a stylistic perspective.

=== From Baroque Renovations to the Second World War (1725–1944) ===
Lichtenstein changed its proprietor once again in 1694 and was passed on to the Leerse family, who had immigrated from Breda (Netherlands) to Frankfurt in the 17th century. It was also during this time that the alternative house name Zum kleinen Römer (lit., "to the little Roman") first appeared, which can certainly be traced back to the stepped gable of the northern and southern firewalls as well as to the stone architecture that appeared nowhere else on the Römerberg.

Gothic constructions were not really considered as worth seeing due to the contemporary taste of the dawning 18th century, which is why they were dismantled in huge numbers or massively reconstructed in a baroque fashion. In comparison, Johann Georg Leerse, the landlord at the time, proceeded more carefully during the renovation of the house that was planned in 1725 and executed by Louis Remy de la Fosse, an architect from Darmstadt. De la Fosse stood out because he had previously built the Residential Palace Darmstadt and he would later get recognition in Frankfurt for his work on the Römerberg as well. In this regard the Holzhausen aristocratic family from Frankfurt entrusted him only two years later in 1727 with the construction of the Little Holzhausen palace (“Holzhausenschlösschen”), which was named after the family and is situated to this day in the park Holzhausen (“Holzhausenpark”). The palace was interestingly enough built on top of the foundation walls of a medieval water castle which belonged to the potential builder-owners of Lichtenstein House, the Schurge zu Lichtenstein family, in the late 14th century.

Probably similar to the alterations from two centuries ago, the renovation only profoundly changed the roof of the Lichtenstein House in its substance by imposing a wall dormer. The appearance of the front of the house was harmonised and architectural elements like windows and portals were converted to Baroque style. The rooms of the first floor, which look out onto the Römerberg, were furnished with high quality stucco on the ceiling, although the execution suggests that the stucco on the ceilings comes from the middle of the 18th century.

The building changed its owner again in 1774 and descended to the Manskopf family, who were a family of wine merchants from Frankfurt, as inheritance (German: fideicommissum) for Leerse's great-grandson Jakob Philipp Manskopf, who, as a consequence, had to call himself Leerse. They demanded to carefully renovate the building once again in 1777. The rear house at the Kerbengasse was exposed up to its late Gothic ground floor and the entries to the street were walled up and transformed into windows. The floors above were rebuilt imperceptibly from an architectural point of view. An entry from the courtyard and across a staircase, that was decorated in the style of Rococo, was also built.

At that time, the downfall of the Holy Roman Empire was already in full swing and the Römerberg only witnessed two more ostentatious imperial coronations in the 1790s. The building was at the centre of European history one more time when Frederick William III of Prussia, the future king of one of the new European great powers, met his future wife Duchess Louise of Mecklenburg-Strelitz at a ball in Lichtenstein House on 14 March 1793.

In 1806, the Holy Roman Empire fell apart after nearly one millennium, causing the end of imperial coronations and the waning importance of the fair. As a result, the Altstadt of Frankfurt was declining rapidly in the 19th century and, along with it, Lichtenstein House fell into a deep sleep and into a time where it was not truly appreciated by the yet again altered prevailing taste. Just like some other houses at the Römerberg, the façade of Lichtenstein nearly fell victim to a neoclassicist renovation in 1822, but this was never fulfilled.

Especially in the second half of the 19th century, the house was more likely saved from complete ruin by the massive construction than by the several half-timbered buildings of the Altstadt. This construction method kept the rents at a level that did not expose Lichtenstein House to utter misappropriation. Nonetheless, contemporary pictures of the photographer Carl Friedrich Mylius depict the house as completely disfigured with shattered windows because of large promotional signs on the face of the house.

According to an 1877 address book from Frankfurt, Lichtenstein House, in which the Frankfurt historian and school reformer Anton Kirchner worked as a school tutor for the Manskopf family at the beginning of the century, was by now only a real estate that was rented by the simpleminded middle and working class. At that time the family who owned the property already had a residential address on a terrain known as Fischerfeld, where newly built and, for the period, luxurious neighbourhoods of wide scope had been constructed in a classicist fashion. However, Gustav D. Manskopf, at the time the head of the family, still acted as generous patron. One of his most popular donations was for the newly consecrated bronze Well of Justice (Gerechtigkeitsbrunnen in German) at the Römerberg in 1887.

Shortly before World War I, the building was bought by the city and refurbished comprehensively. During the process, how well the original building structure had been treated during the past centuries was discovered as the initial timber beams with their Gothic painting were still below the stuccoed ceiling and the former pointed arches were still visible behind the plaster of the circular arches on the ground floor. After the careful renovations came to an end, the city made Lichtenstein House available to the art world of Frankfurt. The so-called artist's kitchen was for example held in the yard in the beginning of the 1920s. The rooms were used in equal measure as living spaces and galleries for purposes of display by artists such as Rudolf Gudden, Hans Brasch and Wilhelm Reiss.

=== From Second World War to Present Day (1944–) ===
During World War II the roof of the building was severely damaged by incendiary bombs. This was the result of the first serious air attack on 4 October 1943. During the Frankfurt bombing in March 1944, which annihilated the entire medieval old town in a matter of hours, Lichtenstein House too was burned to the ground. The enclosing walls survived the attack nearly altogether due to the massive size of construction and for lack of direct hits by explosive bombs. Hence, the house was comparatively well preserved.

From an art-historical perspective and from a point of view of urban construction, the insufficient safeguard of the ruin after the war is regrettable. In contrast, the Roman building nearby was safeguarded right after the end of the combat operation. Until the end of 1945 more and more (but fortunately small) parts of the unstable façade had caved in as a result of frost damage. After that, in the beginning of 1946, a severe storm demolished everything with the exception of the arch openings towards the Römerberg so that in 1948 it was decided to clear away the remains, although the reconstruction had already been assessed at 380 000 Reichsmark.

In the 1950s, the parcels of land of the former houses in Römerberg 3–17 as well as Lichtenstein House were built on in a historical fashion. Even though the houses invoke the architecture of their predecessors at least on a basic level, for example due to slight corbeling opposite of the ground floor, the original parcellation of the area is not recognisable anymore. Thus, from today's point of view the non-reconstruction of Lichtenstein House seems incomprehensible considering its historical and architectural importance and the degree of deconstruction of other reconstructed bourgeois houses (such as the Goethe House or the Stone House) after the war. Then again, the parcellation of the area has relatively hardly been changed in contrast to the antebellum condition, meaning that a reconstruction of the building would be possible in the medium-term.

== Architecture ==
=== General ===
The architectural details of Lichtenstein House, in particular the interior, have only survived in the form of an extremely short monograph from the end of the 19th century. Nearly all of the documents that could have provided information about the house's structural changes over the past centuries, along with files of the city building authority, were destroyed during the Second World War. In this regard, knowledge of the house's past architectural features has to be constructed through a number of negligible photographs as well as old non-photographic images. A lot can therefore be only conjecture, which, like many historical details, is more or less supported mostly by analogies to comparable buildings.

Nevertheless, the local artistic and historical significance of the Lichtenstein House should not be underestimated, as it was one of the few surviving examples of a large, artistically ambitious baroque reconstruction of a Frankfurt Altstadt house until 1944. In those times, renovations rarely went beyond adding stucco ceilings or changing roofs. Much more common was that completely new houses were built, but only within the framework of classic craft tradition and certainly not with the help of a non-local architect such as Louis Remy de la Fosse. After all, the Lichtenstein House was already considered a rarity for its building type, as there were only about 20 comparable stone buildings in medieval Frankfurt, of which only the Stone House (German: Steinerne Haus) and the Canvas House (German: Leinwandhaus) survived after the most severe war destruction and reconstruction.

=== Exterior ===
==== The Medieval Building (1326 until 1725) ====
The large building, which was built from quarrystone, covered an almost quadrilateral plot. This was certainly built through the merging of two smaller plots of land, especially if one considers the size of the former surrounding plots on older land registered plans. Since Lichtenstein House was located between the Schrothaus and Alt-Strahlberg buildings (house address: Römerberg 9) it only had two architecturally designed sides other than the roof.

One of the most architecturally accurate pictures of the front of the medieval Lichtenstein house before the baroque renovation came from Leopold I's coronation diary, which was engraved by Caspar Merian (see picture), who was the son of the famous Matthäus Merian. Based on this view, the well-known Frankfurt painter Carl Theodor Reiffenstein produced a detailed sketch (see picture) in the middle of the 19th century, which from today's academic perspective reproduces the building in its former state very precisely.

It shows the 5-meter-high ground floor from south to north, or left to right, with a small round-arched entrance, followed by a large round-arched entrance, which is then followed by two smaller pointed-arched entrances. The large, round-arched entrance was 4.50 meters high and led through to a closed corridor inside at the back of the house through to a door of the same size into the back garden. The other entrances opened into the interior. Above the portals were canopies called Schoppen, which were quite common in medieval Frankfurt (see, for example, the depictions by Caspar Merian, in which almost all houses have these canopies).

While the number of windows on the unadorned west-side of the medieval Lichtenstein House, which faces the courtyard, has not been recorded, the east side and the visible sides of the Römerberg (lit, "Roman Mountain") had four large cross-windows on each of the high upper floors, each floor being 4 meters high. This type of window, which was very large and expensive by medieval standards, can today only be seen in Frankfurt's stone houses.

The high gable roof, bordered by the staggered firewalls at the southern and northern ends of the facade, was the only one that was oriented towards the eaves in this area of the Römerberg. It had four small dormers on each side of the roof on all of the illustrations (and therefore probably always had these dormers), two of which were always built in a row. In addition, semicircular windows were fitted on the top of the walls on each side, allowing light to come through the top of the three attics.

Already on the roof of the medieval Lichtenstein House on the level of the first attic there were dormers, three of which were small towers with pointed spires. They were probably the best references to sacred architecture and may not have been shown until a roof truss was built. This area was previously occupied by dormer windows in the early 16th century (see historical section). This form of roof tower can still be seen at Haus zum Engel on Samstagsberg (lit, "Saturday Mountain"), on the east side of the Römerberg.

Apart from a stair tower, the back garden had no additional rear houses built directly on Lichtenstein House until 1725. The stair tower had certainly existed since the house was first built, since the beam ceilings in the main house had no openings for a staircase that had been built internally. Additionally, this would probably have required a wooden support structure, which Lichtenstein House, unlike most other Gothic stone houses, also did not have. Due to the still relatively small lot of land, the beam ceilings did not require any additional support. Sometime in the 16th century, there was a late Gothic style building opposite the back courtyard which faced west to the Kerbengasse. The fact that the building had a round arch on the front and the back, which led directly into the courtyard, suggests that from the beginning it was part of Lichtenstein House as a rear house. The birds-eye view by Matthäus Merian from 1628 shows it as a simple, two-story house with a gable roof.

==== The Baroque Building (1725 until 1944) ====
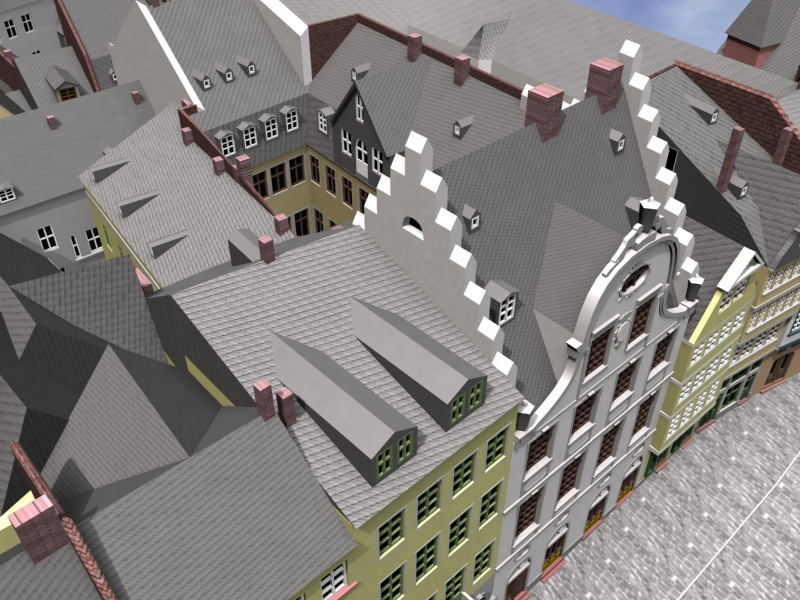
Roof construction and real buildings birds-eye view, Jörg Ott's virtual old town model

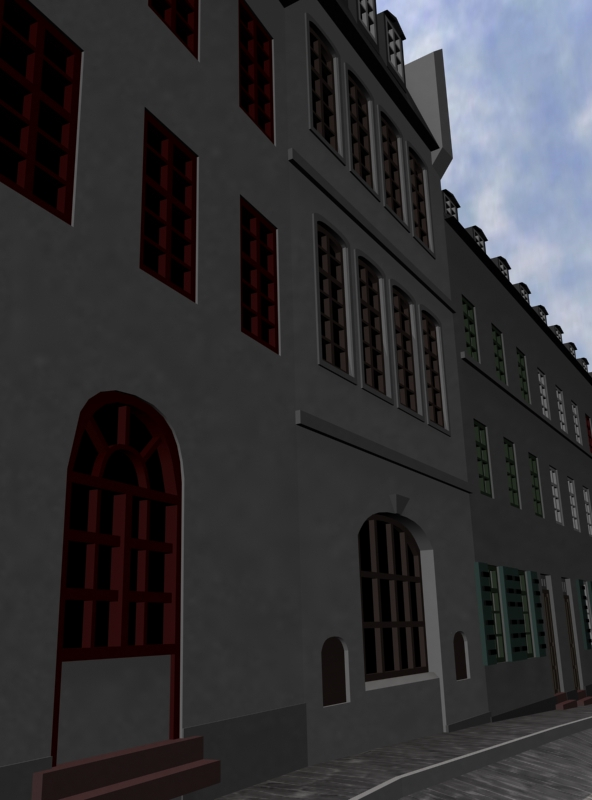
Hinterhaus an der Kerbengasse, Virtuelles Altstadtmodell Jörg Ott

During the Baroque renovation, the ground floor was only slightly changed in order to harmonise the appearance of the overall house. For example, the pointed-arched doors were converted into round-arched doors and the passages' large door was made slightly smaller. Above every door, the Schoppen were replaced in favour of round skylights (called ox-eye windows), which at the time were more popular.

The number of windows on the front of the house facing the Römerberg also stayed the same and the windows were only slightly narrowed. The new windows were also provided with finer sash bars, keystones, crossettes and an enhanced profile. Filigree, artistically forged lattices were also added to the windows on the second floor. In the area of the roof, three late-Gothic towers were replaced by a dormer, on which a large dutch gable was superimposed. This brought the baroque renovation to a more muted conclusion, as the building was not made to stand out against its surrounding, which consisted mostly of medieval houses. The two volutes as well as the upper end of the gables boasted antique vases. Between the two baroque windows in the gable (which were also richly framed but in contrast to the floors below did not have a keystone)) there was a corbel with the initials of the house owner Johann Georg Leerse on it. Like the oval window above it, it was richly framed with baroque curvature work (German: Scheifwerk).

As the out-of-fashion gable was not removed on this occasion, it can be considered certain that the entire roof construction was only changed, but not completely rebuilt. The fact that the four dormers windows were only moved and the lower two were kept in a slightly more detailed version, suggests that nothing was changed of the basic interior layout of the roof.

In contrast, the changes that were made on the courtyard side appear more prominently. The old stair tower were demolished and two elongated half-timbered houses, north and south to the rear building on Kerbengasse, were built on stone ground floors:

The south of the two extensions only reached the first third of the house's length under the roof of the main house, as it accommodated a staircase to replace the tower. The remaining two thirds were only designed as an upper floor resting on pillars and built on the rear building. The northern longitudinal structure rested on the ground floor with circular arches. The two floors above were supported by cantilever stones which were decorated with baroque foliage. It was completed by a two-story mansard roof with a dormer. The hatchway provides proof that at least the roof, and perhaps also the entire building, was used primarily for storage purposes.

In 1777, the rear building to the Kerbengasse was torn down with only the preservation of the late Gothic ground floor with its large cellar vault. The upper floors were rebuilt in the simple style of the era (which already ended in the Louis XVI style), with two floors and a mansard roof (see picture). In the courtyard, a free-standing staircase, decorated with art-forged lattices, which lead into the newly renovated house was built. The house only had two dormer windows on this side due to the interlacing with the other rear buildings on the first floor. It had four windows on both the floor above and on the mansard roof, and three more dormer windows on the roof.

On the Kerbengasse side, the division with the four windows per floor and on the mansard roof was more uniform. It remains unclear whether the round arched passage was bricked up on both sides at this time or only during the 19th century in order to make the whole ground floor usable. On the Kerbengasse side, the passage was transformed into a large central one as the doors to the right and left of it were converted into two smaller windows, the rounded arches of which were still reminiscent of the original use. An ordinary door was built in to the middle of the brick arch on the courtyard side, which was surrounded on the left, right and above by an additional inbuilt window.

Inner courtyard views of Lichtenstein House, virtual Altstadt model by Jörg Ott

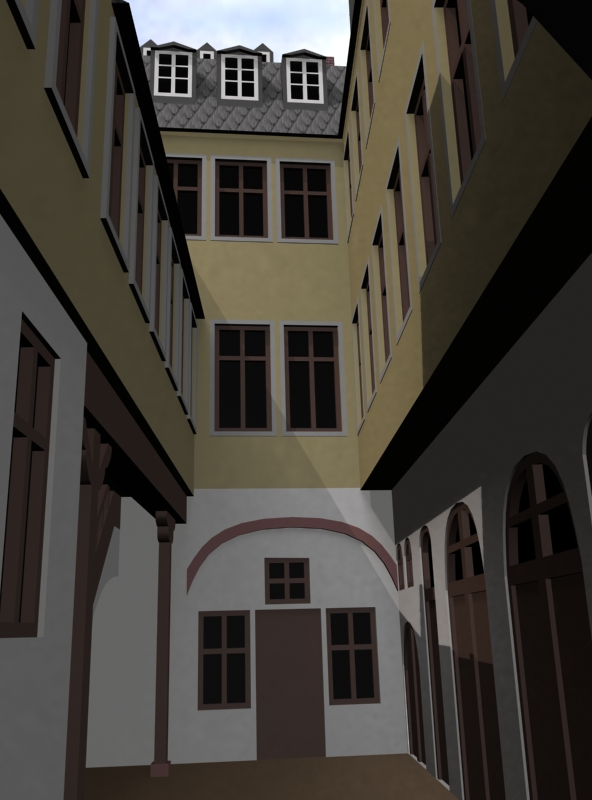
Looking West

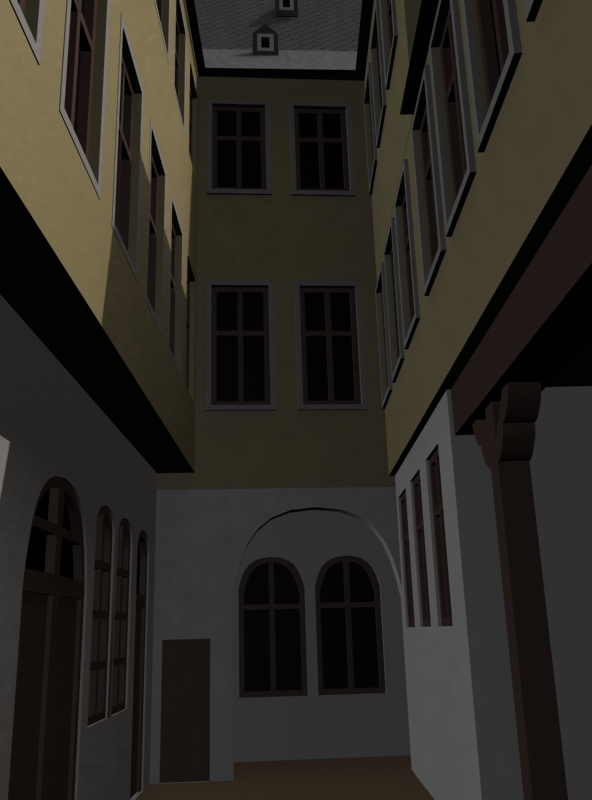
Looking East

=== Ground Floor ===
As with almost all medieval stone buildings in Frankfurt's Altstadt, the floors, partitions and ceilings in Lichtenstein House were not large, but were structures borrowed from the half-timbered building. The ground floor's ceiling might even have had a vault that fell victim to later conversions. The original existence of a mezzanine for goods storage, which was common in old Frankfurt and is called Bobbelage in German, was more secure. There is however no information on either of these features.

The original interior layout of the ground floor remains unclear due to the lack of tradition in this area. However, a comparison of the only existing floor plan from the end of the 19th century (see picture) with the floor plan of the stone house, in which the original interior has been shown to have been preserved, suggests that the floor plan reflects a medieval style.

Accordingly, behind the two right doors seen from the Römerberg was a large room that led to the stair tower, which was attached to the back of the house in the Middle Ages. In more recent times, a door to the courtyard was built into the western wall. In the Middle Ages, the room was primarily used for trading and measuring purposes. Behind the second door on the left, as seen from the Römerberg, there was probably a passage separated on the left and right by half-timbered walls, which led through a round arched door at the back of the house through to the back courtyard. The door on the far left of the house led into the south-western courtyard extension after 1725. This accommodated an elaborately winding staircase from the 18th century, made of fine wood and replacing the original tower extension, which opened up to the two floors above.

During the renovation of the house in the early 20th century, the entire room made contiguous. This was probably contrary to the original floor plan and in favour of more usable space. This is as far as can be seen from the photos of the renovation received by the Institute for City History (German: Institut für Stadtgeschichte) in Frankfurt. The door, which led through to the back of the courtyard, was bricked up and provided with windows in order to brighten the room, which was otherwise only illuminated by the skylights facing the Römerberg.

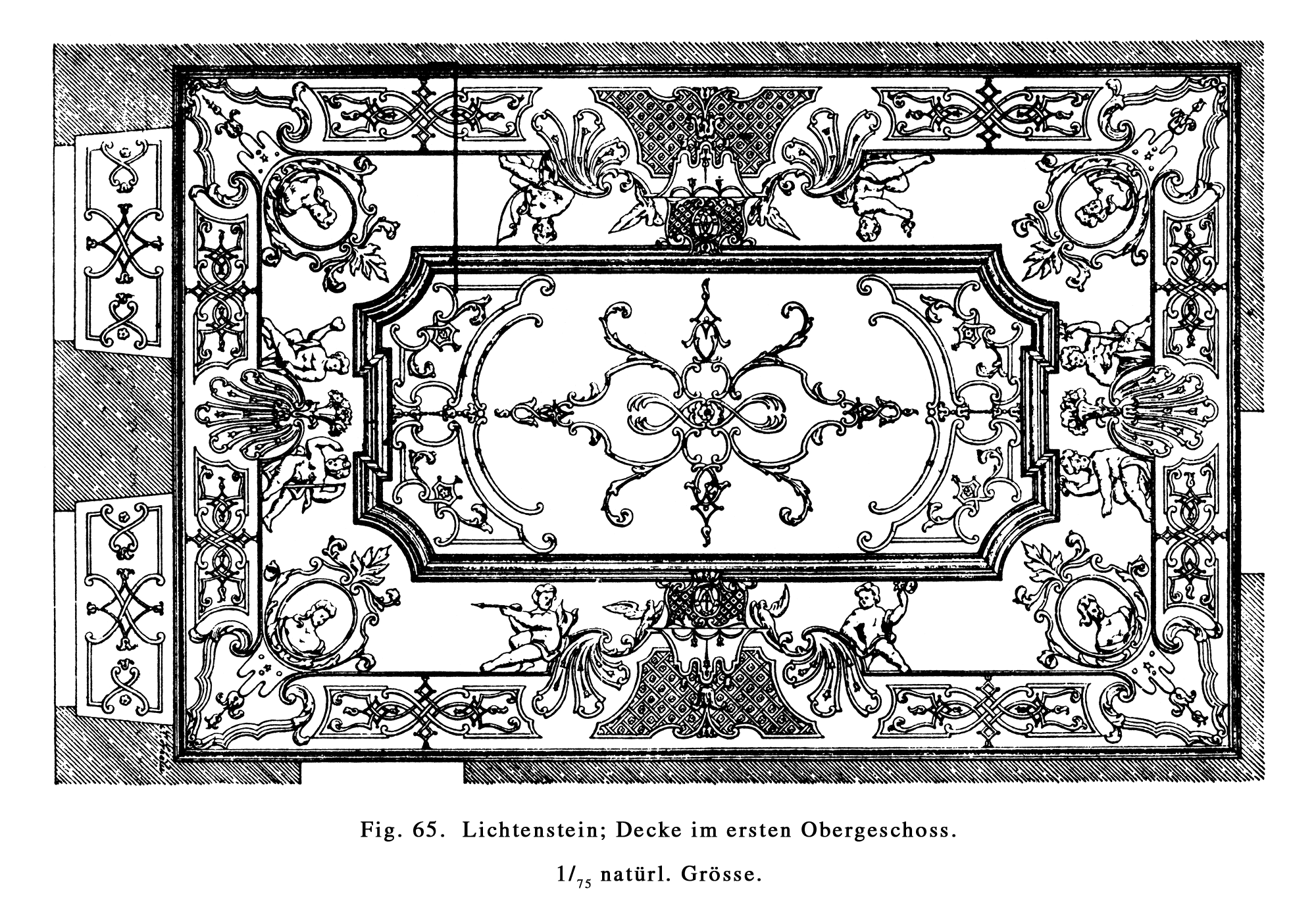
Dimensions of the stucco ceiling on the first floor, around 1900

=== Upper Floors and the Roof ===
The upper floors were reachable via the aforementioned stairs of the south-western extension. The interior layout of these floors had hardly changed when compared to the ground floor. Each floor was divided into two large, connected rooms with two windows facing the Römerberg. It remains unclear whether this division was preserved from the Middle Ages, or whether the baroque building divided one room per floor. On the other hand, it is clear that the 1725 renovation added magnificent stucco ceilings to the two rooms on the first floor. The plasterer is unknown, but it could have been the Mainz artist Hennicke, who was known only by his surname, who in this time was active in the electoral office of the nearby Rőmer (Frankfurt's city hall). The execution of the Stucco ceilings is certainly reminiscent of an artist who also had courtly qualities.

Nothing is known about the three floors of the roof structure. Apart from the lower floor, which has always been illuminated by larger windows (whether by the late Gothic turrets or the baroque gable), it would have been so dark in this area that it could be used for little more than just storage purposes. In addition, the dormers, however, offered an excellent view over the roofs of the entire Altstadt, since the Lichtenstein House towered above almost all of the surrounding buildings.

== Literature ==
- Johann Georg Battonn: Oertliche Beschreibung der Stadt Frankfurt am Main – Band IV. Verein für Geschichte und Alterthumskunde zu Frankfurt am Main, Frankfurt am Main 1866. (Digital link)
- Rudolf Jung, Julius Hülsen: Die Baudenkmäler in Frankfurt am Main. Third Volume. Heinrich Keller, Frankfurt am Main 1914, pp. 78–81 https://publikationen.ub.uni-frankfurt.de/files/16071/baudenkmaeler_3.pdf
- Paul Wolff, Fried Lübbecke: Alt-Frankfurt, Neue Folge. Verlag Englert & Schlosser, Frankfurt am Main 1924, pp. 36–39.
- Walter Sage: Das Bürgerhaus in Frankfurt a. M. bis zum Ende des Dreißigjährigen Krieges. Wasmuth, Tübingen 1959 (Das Deutsche Bürgerhaus 2), pp. 30, 31.
- Georg Hartmann, Fried Lübbecke: Alt-Frankfurt. Ein Vermächtnis. Verlag Sauer und Auvermann, Glashütten 1971, pp. 45, 65–67.
- Hans Pehl: Kaiser und Könige im Römer. Das Frankfurter Rathaus und seine Umgebung. Verlag Josef Knecht, Frankfurt 1980, pp. 87–90, ISBN 3-7820-0455-8.
- Wolfgang Klötzer: Frankfurts alte Gassen. Ariel Verlag, Sulzbach im Taunus 1982, pp. 18, 19.
- Hartwig Beseler, Niels Gutschow: Kriegsschicksale Deutscher Architektur – Verluste, Schäden, Wiederaufbau. Volume 2: Süd. Karl Wachholtz Verlag, Neumünster 1988, pp. 820.
