= Paulsplatz =

Public square in Frankfurt, Germany

Coordinates: 50°06′40″N 8°40′53″E

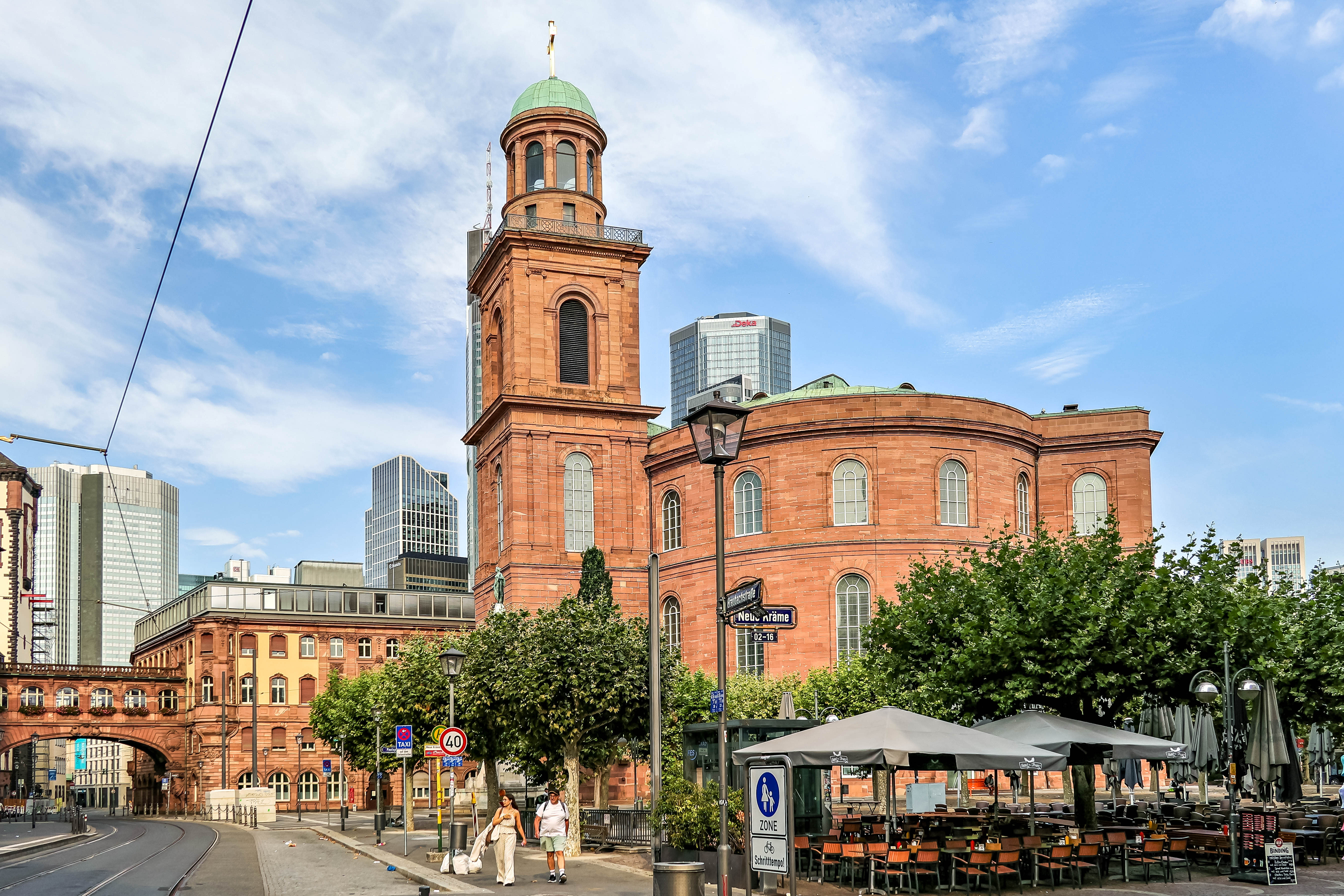
View of Paulsplatz, including St Paul's Church

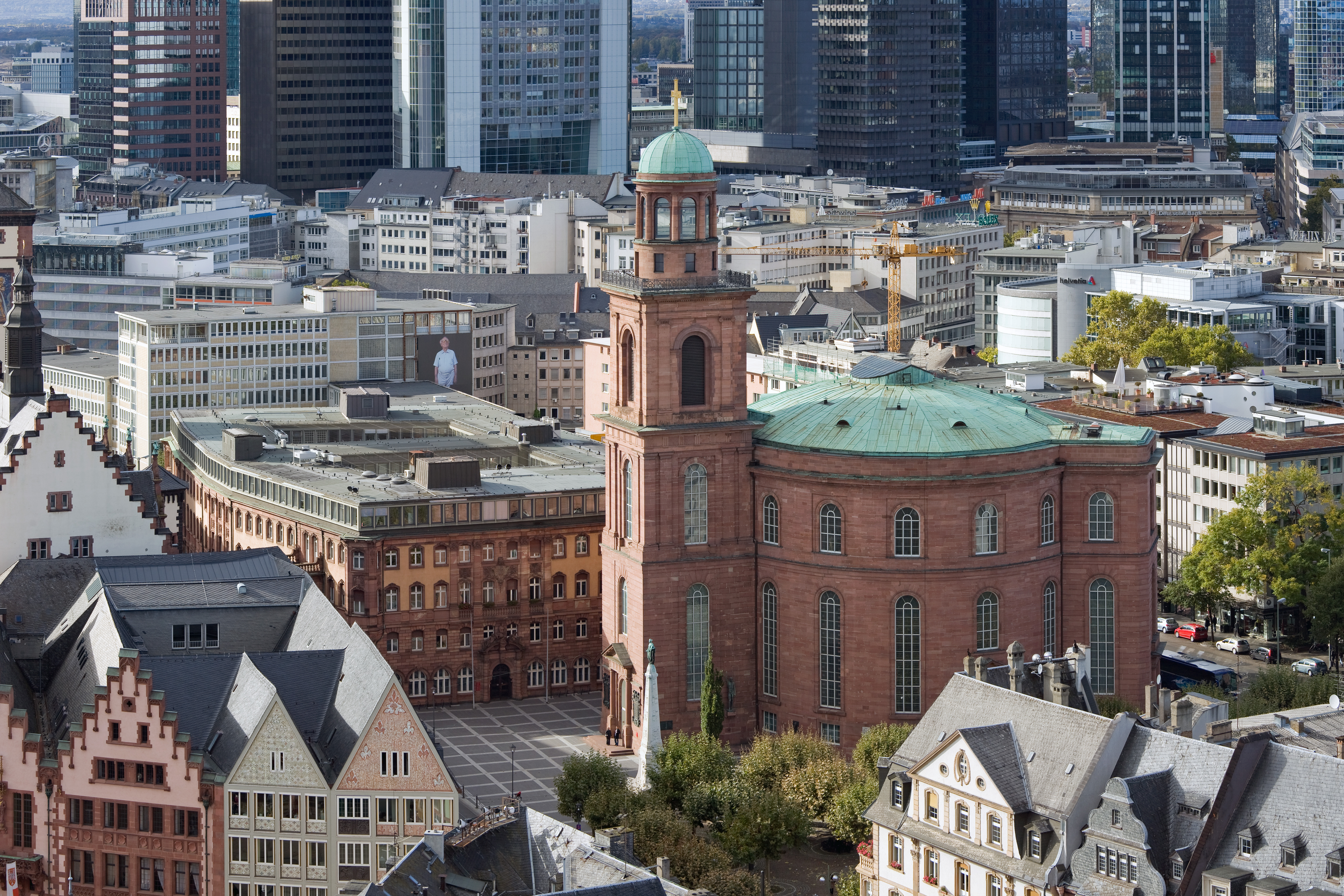
Aerial view of the area around Paulsplatz, including St Paul's Church.

Paulsplatz (St. Paul's Square) is a historic square in the heart of Frankfurt, Germany. St Paul's Church is located here, dominating the square. The Römerberg, another square, is to the south. Berliner Strasse is immediately to the north. Paulsplatz is a major location for the outdoor Frankfurt Christmas Market.

== Overview ==
Paulsplatz is the largest square in the old town of Frankfurt am Main. To the north is Berlin Street, east is the new Kräme (built 1900–08), to the northwest is the Old Town Hall and to the south are Bethmannstraße and Braubachstraße. Since the devastation of World War II in 1944, the square is connected with the Römerberg square to the south.

Dominating Paulsplatz is the classical-style St Paul's Church (1789–1833), the meeting place of the Frankfurt National Assembly of 1848. The square is a pedestrian zone. The eastern part has plane trees and a number of cafés with outdoor tables during summer months. There are various street festivals that take place in the square during the summer, as well as the Frankfurt Christmas Market in late November and December.

== History ==
Until the 18th century, the first recorded Frankfurt Franciscan monastery was located on the site of today's square, from 1270. From 1526 there were regular sermons in the Barfüßerkirche. In 1529, the last eight Franciscans left the monastery. The monastery was handed over to the city council. The Barfüßerkirche became the main Protestant church of Frankfurt. Important theologians such as Philipp Jakob Spener and Johann Friedrich Starck and musicians such as Georg Philipp Telemann attended. The monastic buildings north of the church became a school from 1542.

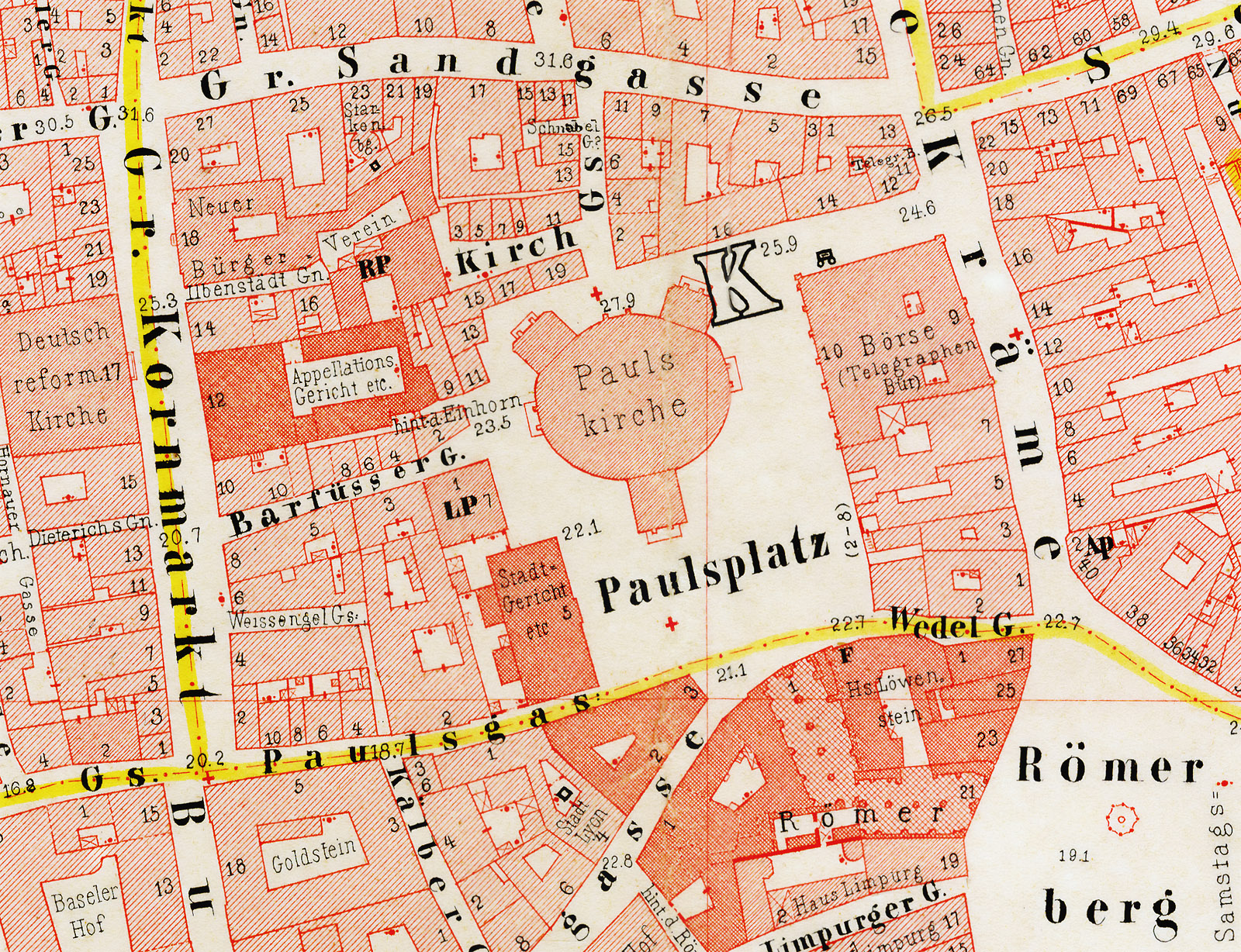
Map of the area around Paulsplatz in 1861.

In the 18th century, the building became too small and dilapidated. In 1782, the Barfüßerkirche was closed and it was demolished in 1786. In 1789, construction of a new church began under municipal architect Johann Georg Christian Hess. Because of delays due to war, construction continued until 1833.

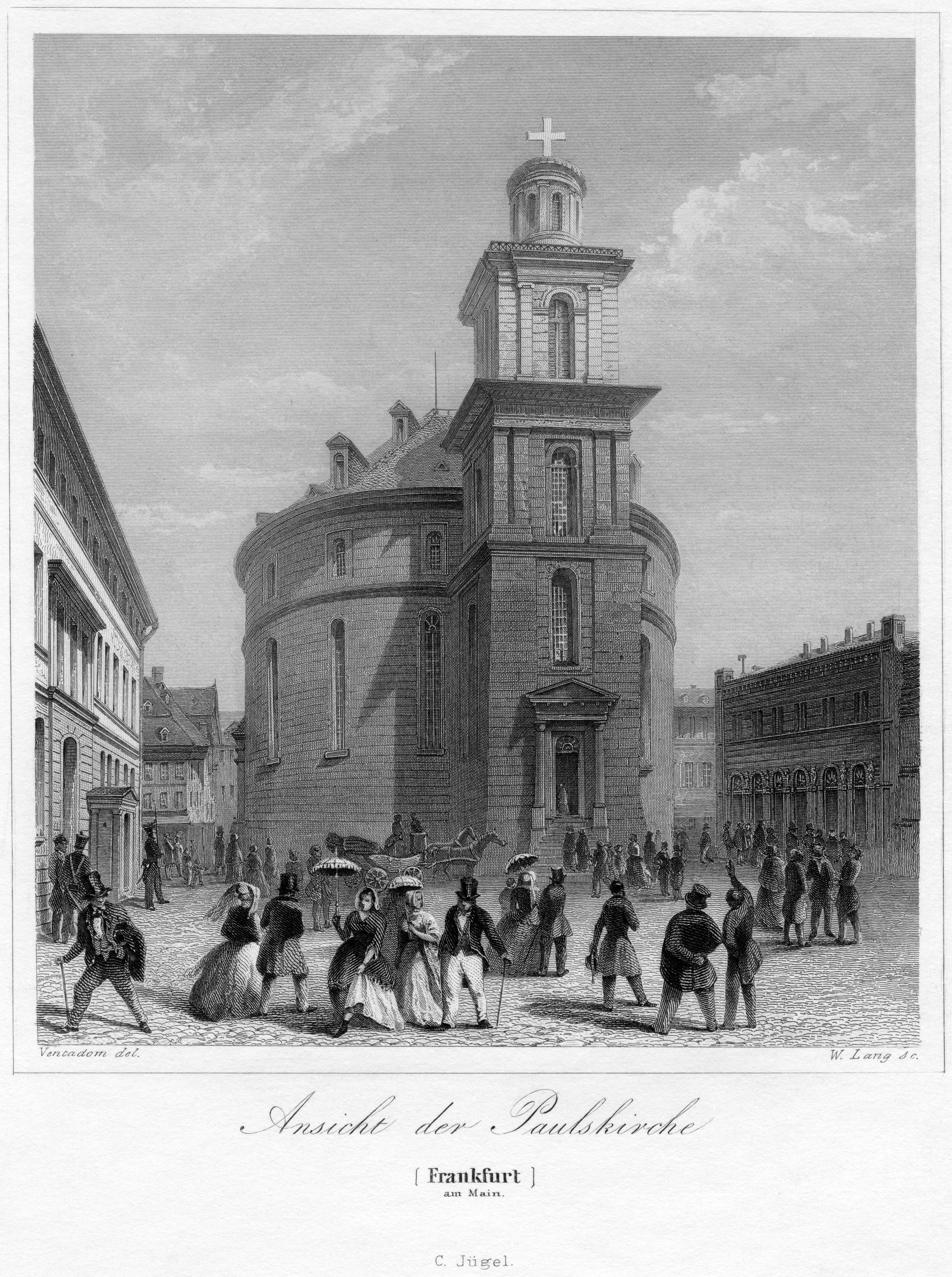
Historical view of St Paul's Church in Paulsplatz.

The construction of the Gothic Barfüßerkirche was oriented in an east–west direction. The new church was an oval building with an offset tower to the south, which also formed the main entrance. The square was connected to the west and east by two narrow lanes following the main north–south axis of the old town.

To the west, east, and north of St Paul's Church, the building was surrounded by a dense development. In 1838, the school and medieval monastery buildings were demolished. In their place, a block was built between Neue Kräme and St Paul's Church, located on the northern side. During 1840–1952, this was the Old Stock Exchange.

== The Old Exchange ==
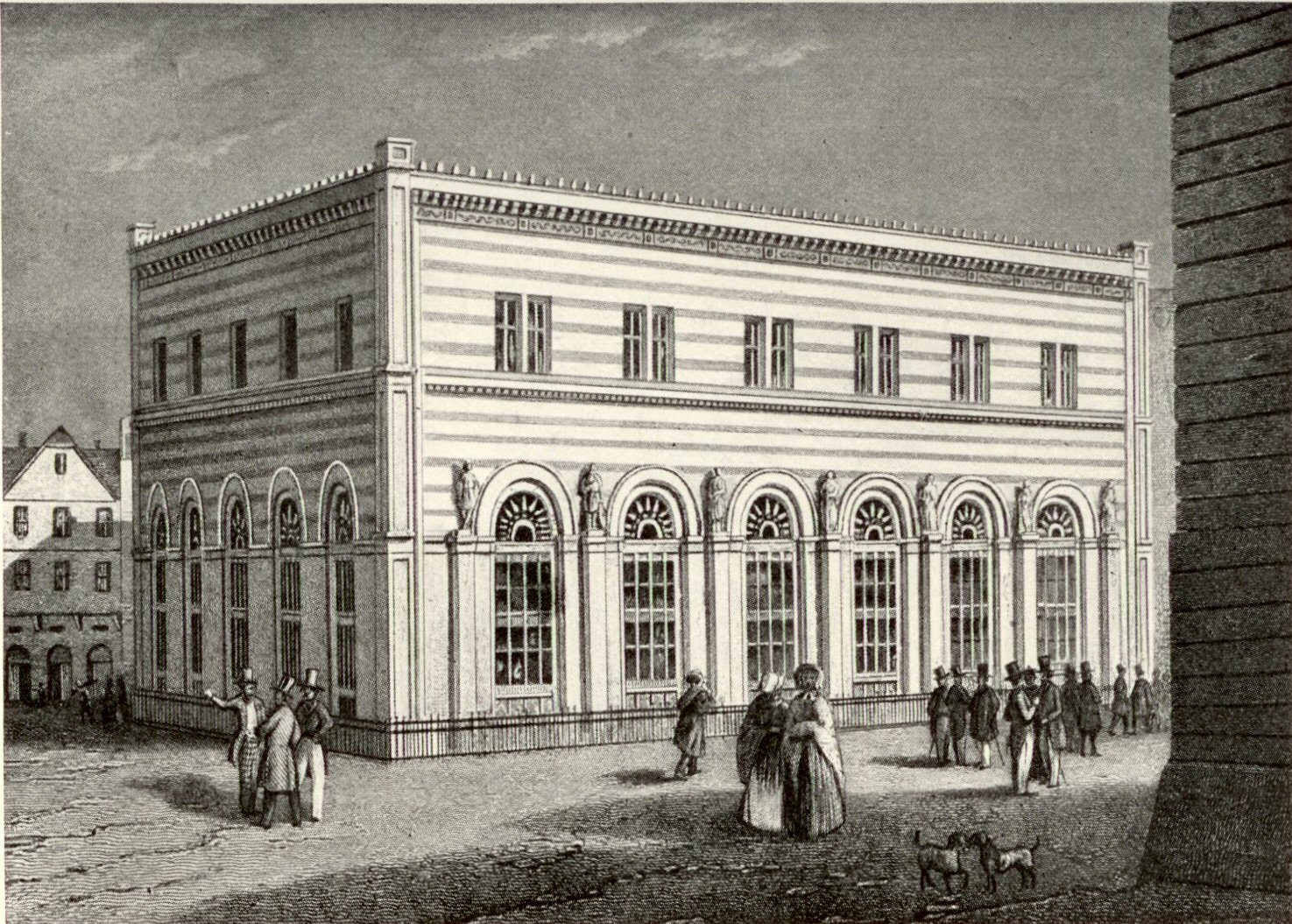
The Old Exchange (Alte Börse) in 1845.

The most significant building in the square while extant, the Old Exchange (Alte Börse), next to the church, was built from 1840 to 1843 by Jakob Friedrich Peiper (1805–1878), following to the plans of the Berlin architect Friedrich August Stüler. The Old Stock Exchange was used for the emerging securities trading market in Frankfurt. The late-classical building was a two-story cube of red and white sandstone. The Old Stock Exchange was also the location of the Frankfurt telegraph offices. In 1879, the Frankfurt Chamber of Commerce supported the Stock Exchange, a new building that still called New Market in the New Town. The Old Stock Exchange was the hall that GmbH adopted and used as a meeting place. In 1944 during World War II, heavy bombing of the city caused the building to be burned down. The remaining outer walls were demolished in 1952.

== The Unity Memorial ==
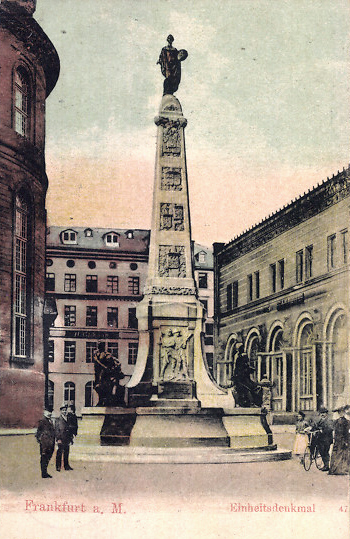
The Unity Monument (Einheitsdenkmal) in 1907, with St Paul's Church to the left and the Old Exchange (now demolished) to the right.

On the square in front of St Paul's Church since 1903 is the Unity Monument (Einheitsdenkmal). In 1898, the city of Frankfurt launched a contest for the monument. The Commission appointed by the city council selected the design of the architect Fritz Hessemer and the sculptor Hugo Kaufmann.

On top of a four-stage base of travertine stone is a three-sided obelisk made of the same material, crowned by an allegorical bronze figure. On pedestals around the base there were three pairs of figure in bronze. The first group, representing the free bourgeoisie and the struggle for freedom, showed a young fighter at a weary older fighter's feet. The next group consisted of an allegorical alma mater, which satisfies the thirst for knowledge of a young man by giving him a drink from a cup. The third group, the song of freedom, presented two men, the elder with a lyre and a youth with a sword, a representation allowing the role of music to be appreciated. The groups of figures were destroyed in 1940 when the metal was melted for the war effort during WWII.

Between the pedestals are three relief panels. The first is the exodus of the fraternity and irregulars for the liberation of Schleswig-Holstein. On the second, a youth of a family says farewell. Among the group are the words of Ernst Moritz Arndt: "We are beaten, not defeated. In such a battle you cannot succumb!" The third relief shows a group of men at a sword forge, one of which bears the features of Bismarck.

It remained unclear who the allegory represents on the top of the obelisk. Contemporary reviewers describe the female figure, with the words "Stand Together", as Clio, the muse of epic poetry, but also as Germania. On 18 October 1903, the 90th anniversary of the Battle of Leipzig, the monument was inaugurated by the Mayor, Franz Adickes.

Römer Frankfurt
Römer, town hall Frankfurt am Main
1 Zum Römer
2 Löwenstein
3 Frauenstein
4 Salzhaus
5 Wanebach
6 Zum goldenen Schwan
7 Bürgersaalbau
8 Silberberg
9 Alt-Limpurg / Laderam
10 Neues Rathaus (new town hall)
11 Seufzerbrücke (bridge of sighs)
12 Römerberg (square)
13 Paulsplatz (square)

== Sources ==
- German page, Wikipedia.
