= Frankfurt Christmas Market =

Annual outdoor market in Germany

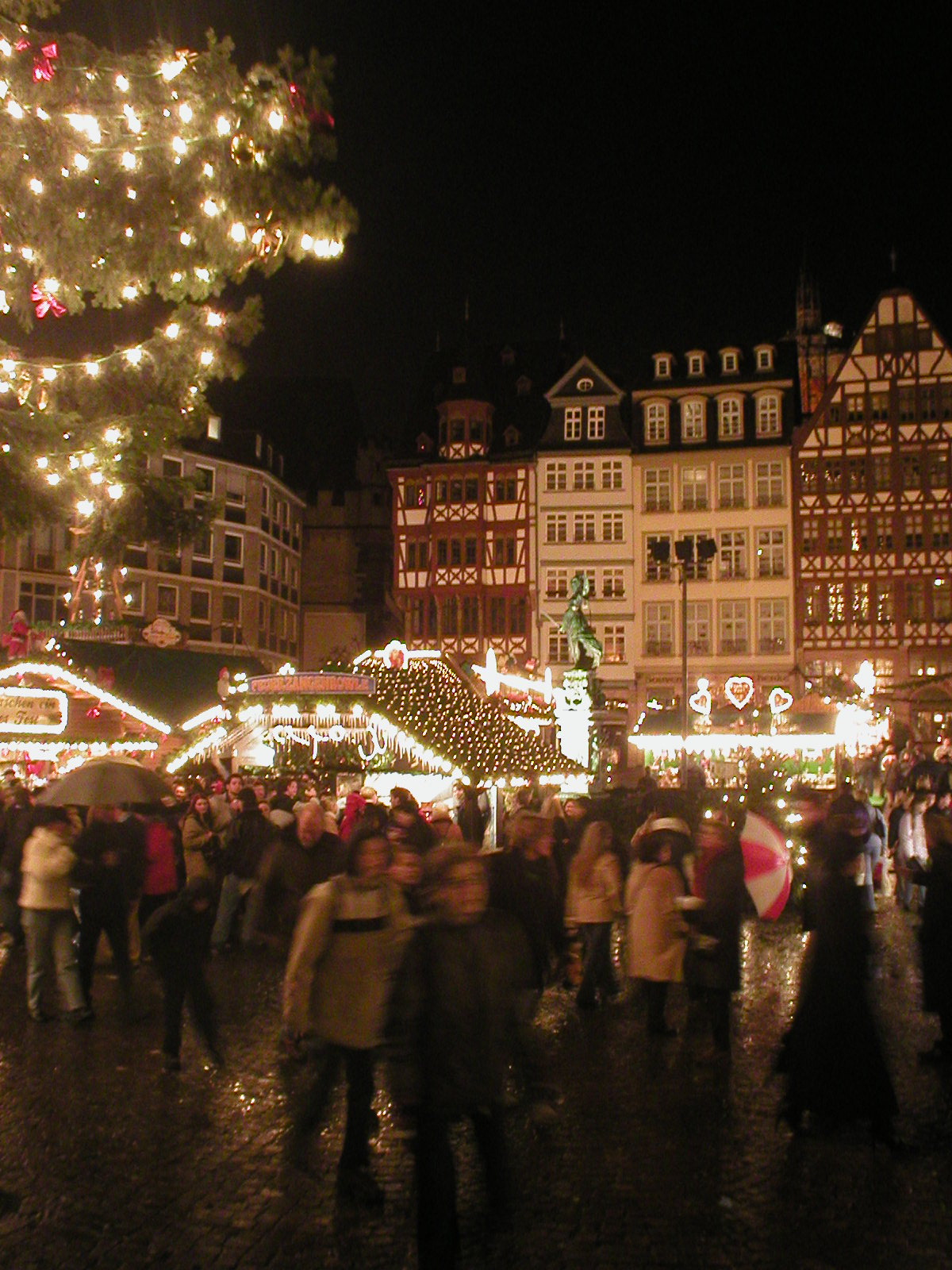
View of the market crowds at night in the main square of Römerberg

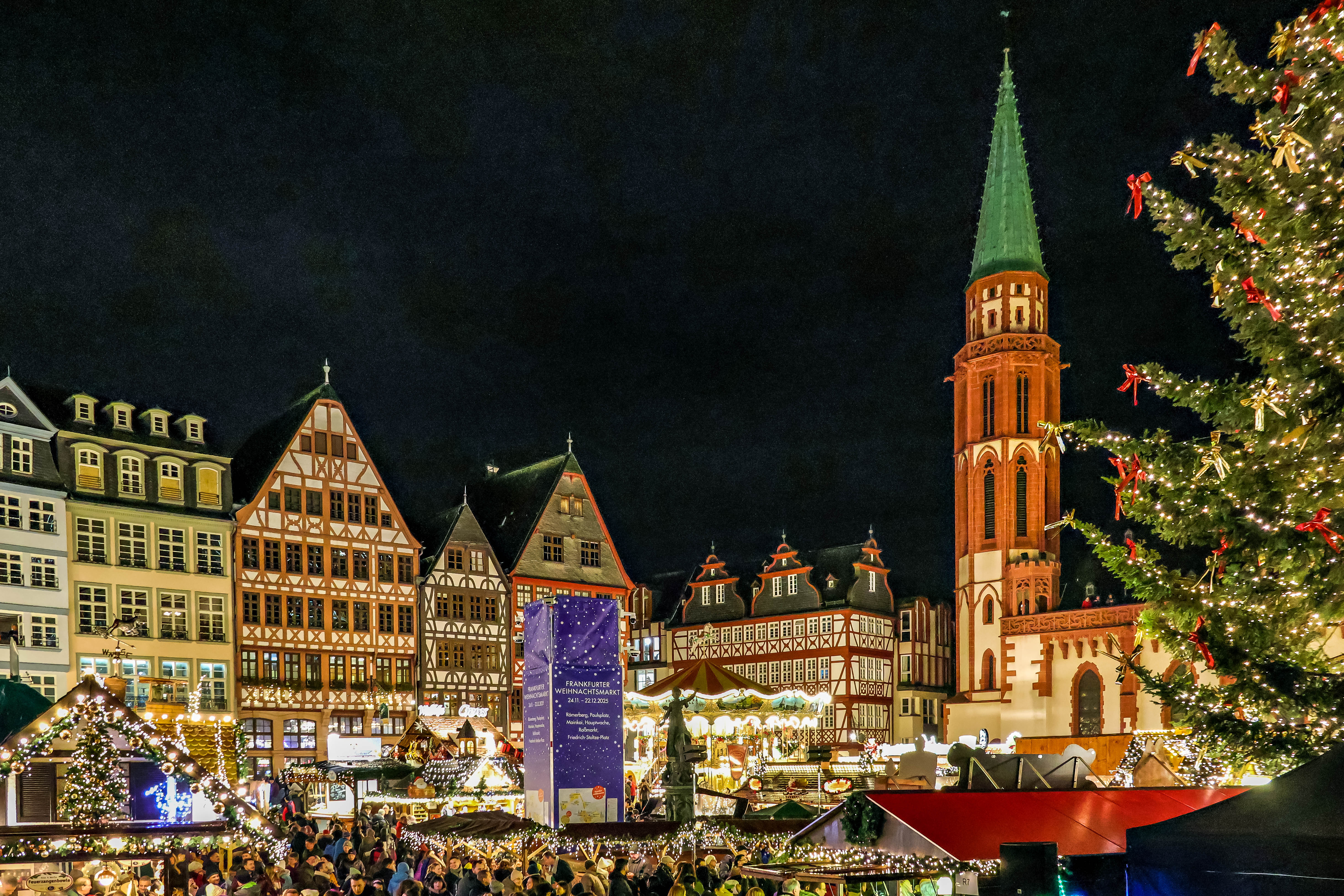
In the year 2025

The Frankfurt Christmas Market (German: Frankfurter Weihnachtsmarkt) is one of the oldest Christmas markets (also known as "Weihnachtsmärkte") in Germany with origins that date back to 1393. It is an annual outdoor Christmas market held in central Frankfurt, Hesse, Germany. The market is open during the period of Advent (from late November and continues until just before Christmas on 22 December). It is visited by approximately three million visitors each year.

The market occupies a large area of the old town in central Frankfurt, including Friedrich-Stoltze-Platz, Hauptwache (to the north), Mainkai, Paulsplatz, and Römerberg (to the south).

There are a number of affiliated markets, including in Birmingham, England.

== History ==
In 1393, the first Christmas market in Frankfurt, Germany, was documented. During this era, Christmas didn't hold the same cultural significance as it does today. The primary purpose of the market was to offer citizens the chance to purchase essential items before the arrival of winter. Unlike fairs, only residents of Frankfurt were allowed to set up stalls.

During the Middle Ages, mystery plays were performed at Christmas Markets, with origins possibly tracing back to 941 CE. It was during this period that King Otto I spent Christmas at the Royal Palace of Frankfurt and attended Christmas Mass at the Salvatorkirche. As King Otto exited the church, his estranged brother, Heinrich, knelt before him and begged for forgiveness, which Otto granted. This scene was later immortalized in a painting by Alfred Rethel in 1840, now housed in the Historical Museum.

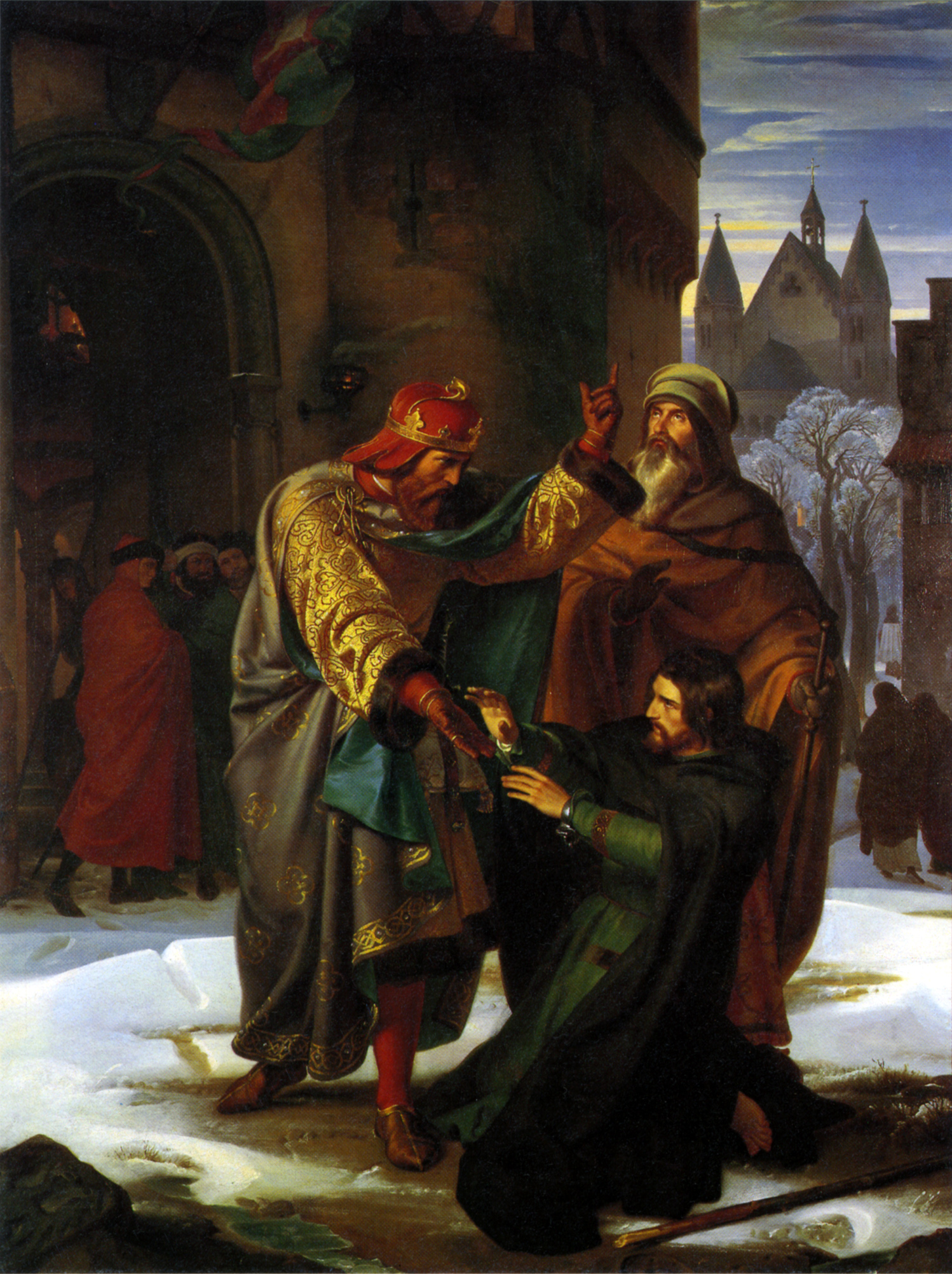
The historical depiction of the Reconciliation of Otto the Great with his brother Henry during the Christmas of 941, with the exposure of Saint Leonard's Church in the background (which was built not until 1220) to serve the clarification of the locality

During the 19th century, the Christmas market started to evolve into the form that is recognizable today. It became more prevalent to decorate and showcase Christmas trees, with Saxon houses being authorized to sell them in the Roman halls. In accordance with the magistrate's decree, only items associated with the Christmas season were allowed to be sold, including toys for children, Christmas trees, gingerbread, and other confectionery products.

Illustrations from the mid-19th century depict scenes resembling those seen today at Römerberg – bustling markets teeming with small stalls. In 1851, author Heinrich Hoffmann published his Christmas fairy tale, "King Nutcracker and Poor Reinhold." The original edition featured a handwritten drawing by Hoffmann himself, showcasing the Frankfurt Christmas market. The tale narrates the dream of a sick boy, who is led to a toy kingdom by King Nutcracker. Upon awakening, he discovers the same toys under his Christmas tree. This marks the earliest known story featuring a nutcracker as a prominent character. Subsequently, in the 1870s, Seiffen in the Ore Mountains began producing turned nutcrackers, which have since become a popular item at Christmas markets.

During the Second World War, the historic setting of the Frankfurt Christmas market was destroyed during Allied air raids. In the post-war period, the market was held in various locations around the city, as the Römerberg was a construction site due to the erection of the subway system in the late 1960s and early 1970s. By the 1970s, the market was able to return to its traditional location. Following the reconstruction of the East Row in the Saturday Mountain in 1983, it has become a popular tourist attraction.

In 2020, due to the COVID-19 pandemic in Germany, the city of Frankfurt cancelled the Christmas market planned for 23 November to 22 December and, in its place, Tourismus+Congress GmbH Frankfurt am Main made digital content available as an online Christmas market on the Internet.

== See also ==
- List of Christmas markets
