= Old St. Nicholas Church =

Church in Frankfurt, Germany

Coordinates: 50°06′36″N 8°40′56″E

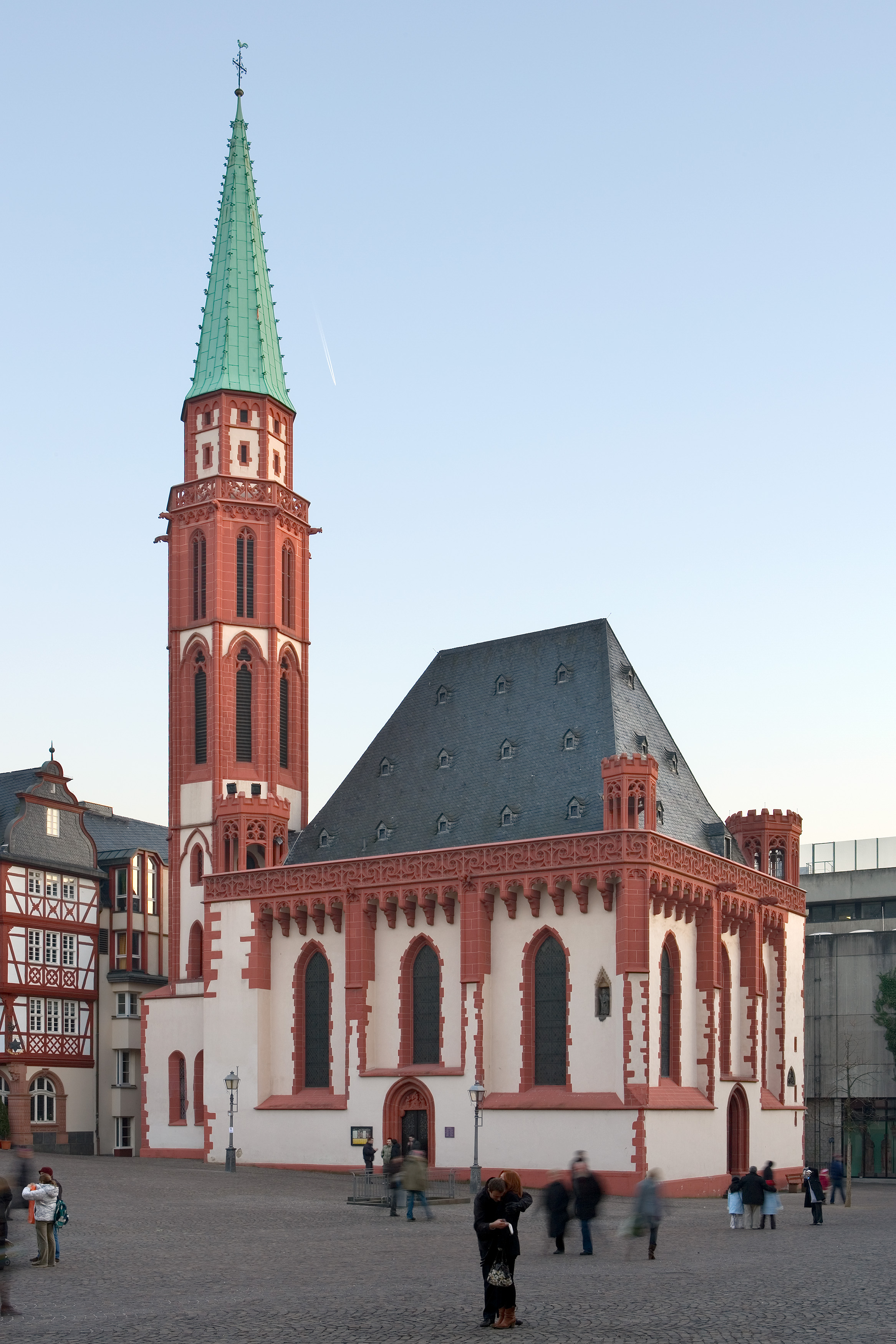
Old St Nicholas Church in Römerberg, Frankfurt

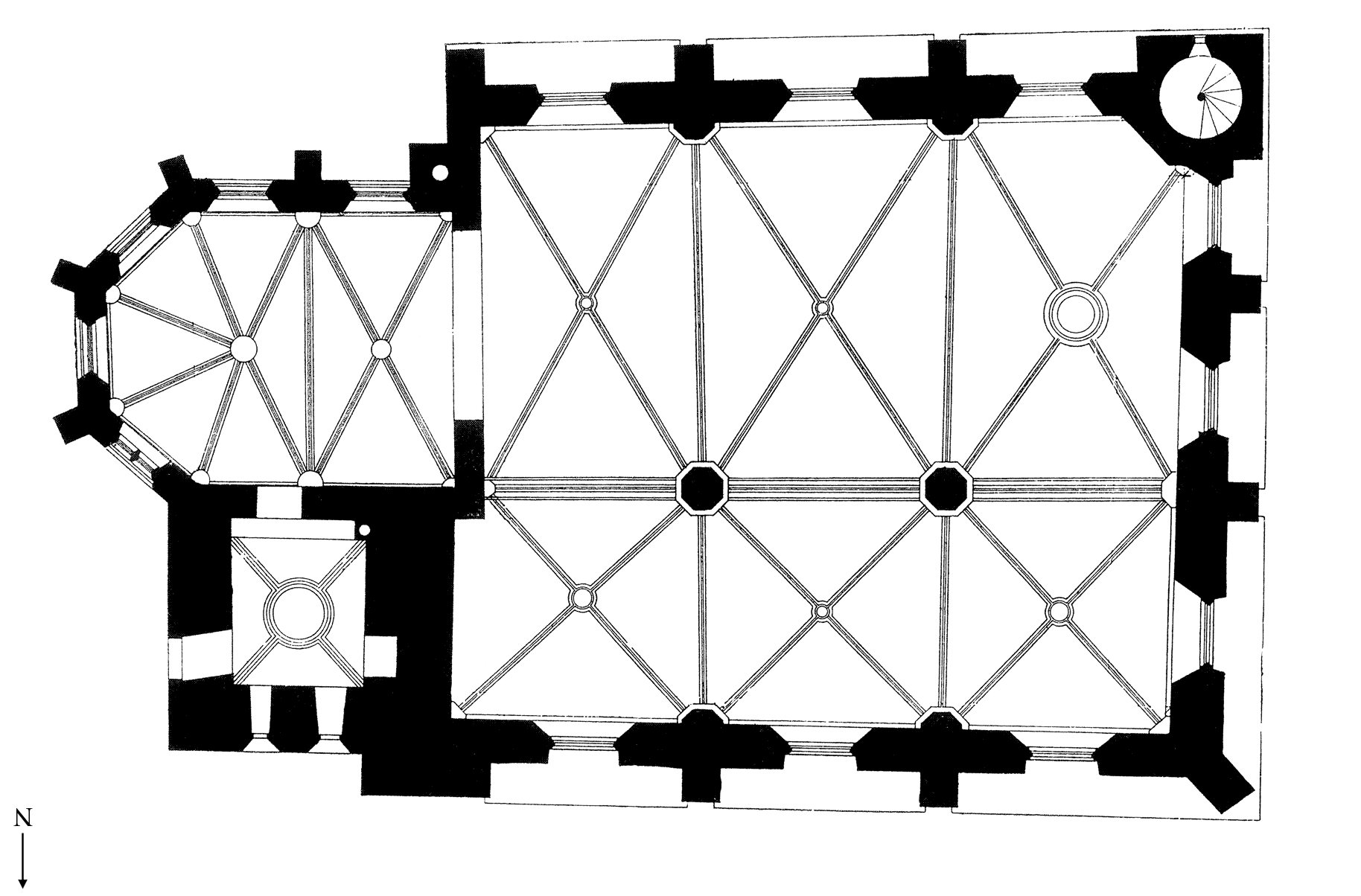
Plan of the church

The Old St. Nicholas Church (in German: Alte Nikolaikirche) in Frankfurt, Germany, is a medieval Lutheran church. It is located near the Römer city hall in Frankfurt's old town called Altstadt. It has 51 bells; 4 are used for peals and 47 are used for carillons. The first chapel on its site was built in the mid-12th century, the current in the mid-15th. Its congregation forms part of today's Protestant Church in Hesse and Nassau, comprising Lutheran, Reformed and United Protestant congregations.

Despite major destruction in the surrounding old town owing to the bombing of Frankfurt am Main in World War II, the Old St Nicholas Church had only minor damage. Nearby, the Dom-Römer Project aims to bring back parts of the old town between the Römerberg square and Frankfurt Cathedral.
