= Römerberg (Frankfurt) =

Public square in Frankfurt, Germany

Coordinates: 50°06′37″N 8°40′56″E

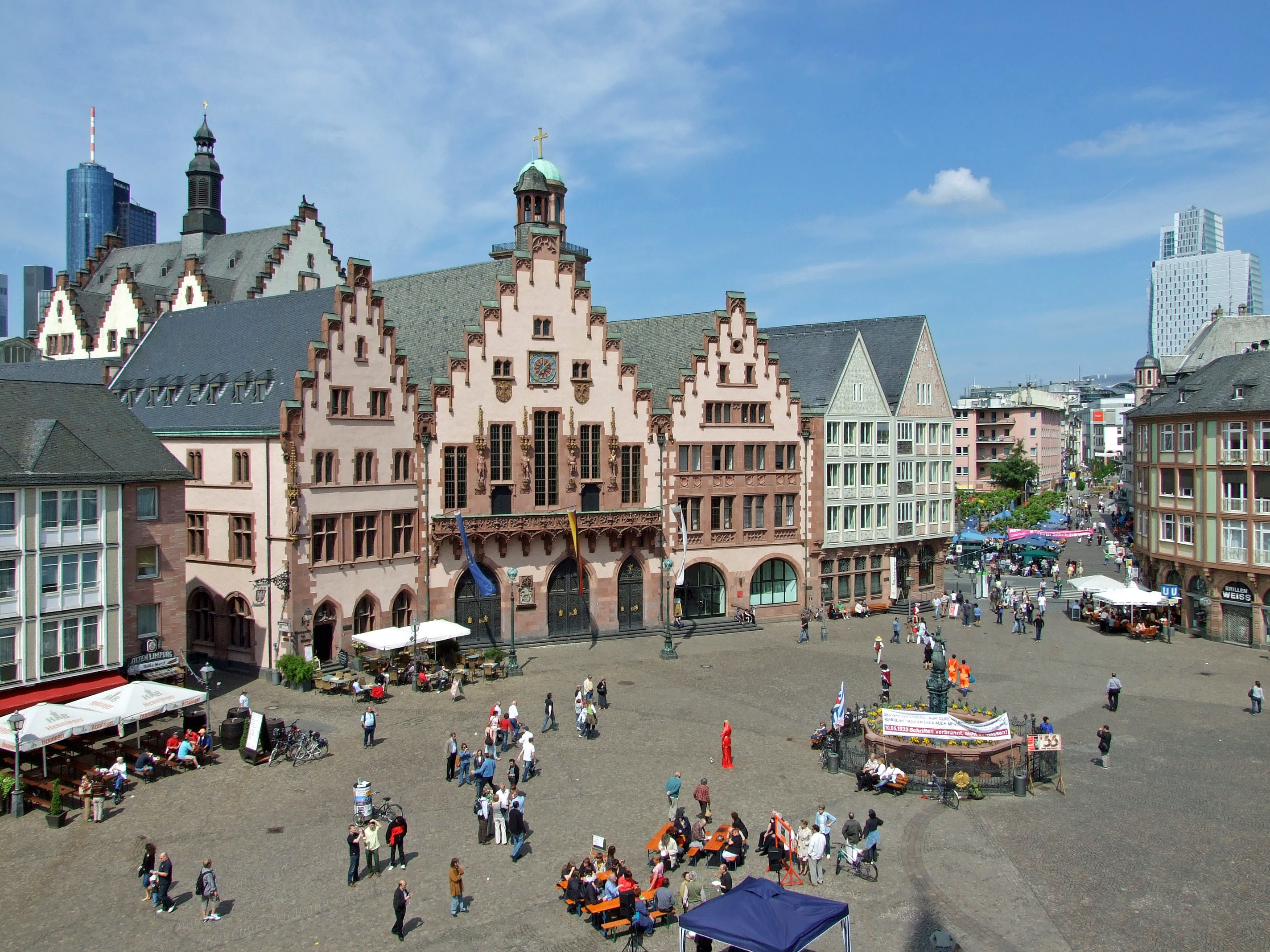
The Römer on the western edge of the squarel

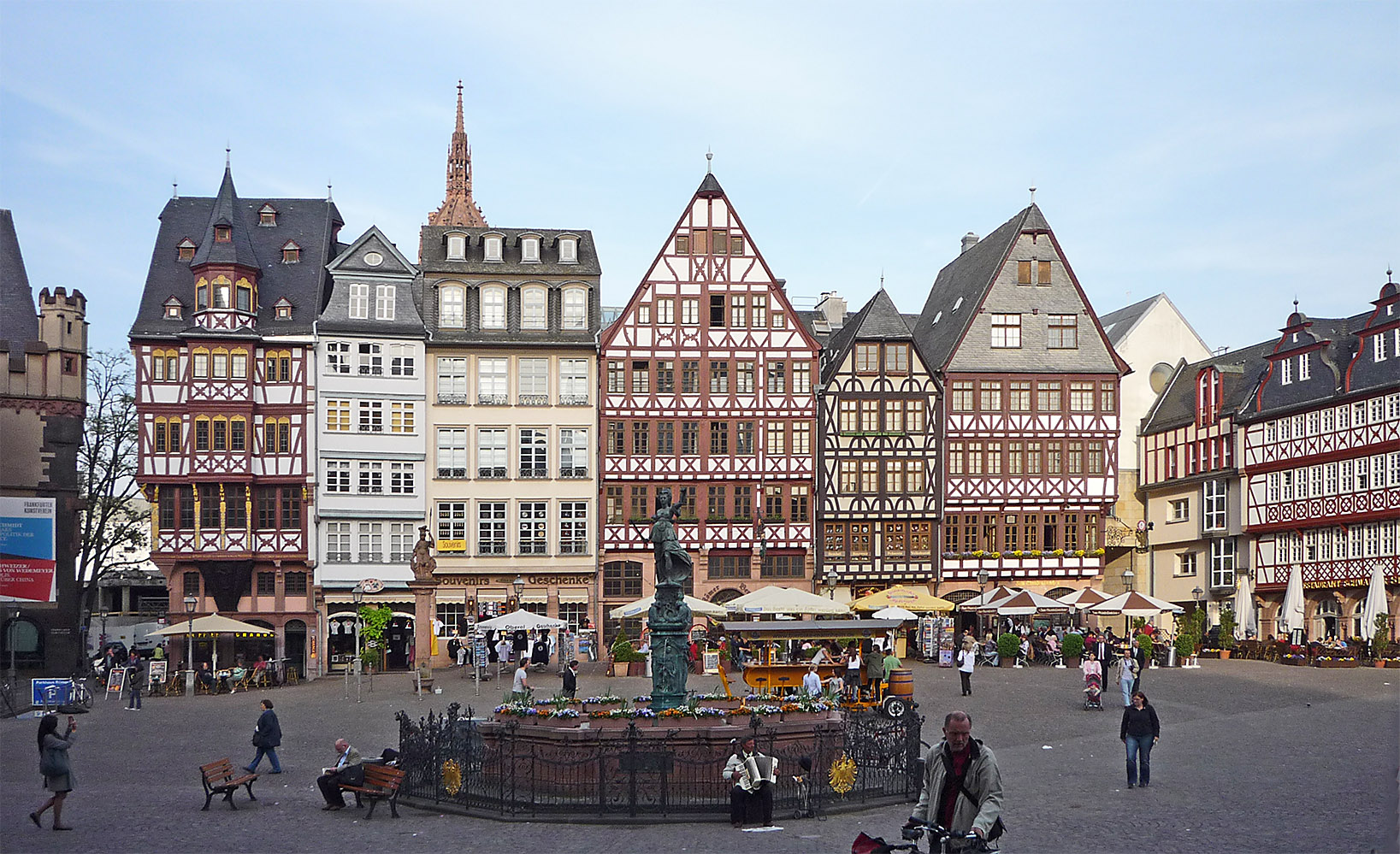
The central fountain and reconstructed eastern section

Römerberg (German pronunciation: [ˈʁøːmɐbɛʁk]; also spelled as Roemerberg, lit. 'Roman Mountain') is a public space in Frankfurt, Germany. It is located in front of the Römer building complex, seat of the Frankfurt city administration since the 15th century. As the site of numerous imperial coronations, trade fairs and Christmas markets, the square is the historic heart of the medieval Altstadt (old town) and a popular tourist destination.

Paulsplatz, another historic square, is to the north. The Old St Nicholas Church and Historical Museum are to the south. Beyond that is the Mainkai, a promenade by the River Main. On the west side of the square is the reconstructed Römer medieval building. To the east is the Dom-Römer Project, and beyond that is Frankfurt Cathedral.

Römerberg is a major location for the outdoor Frankfurt Christmas Market.

It was the site of a Nazi book burning in 1933.

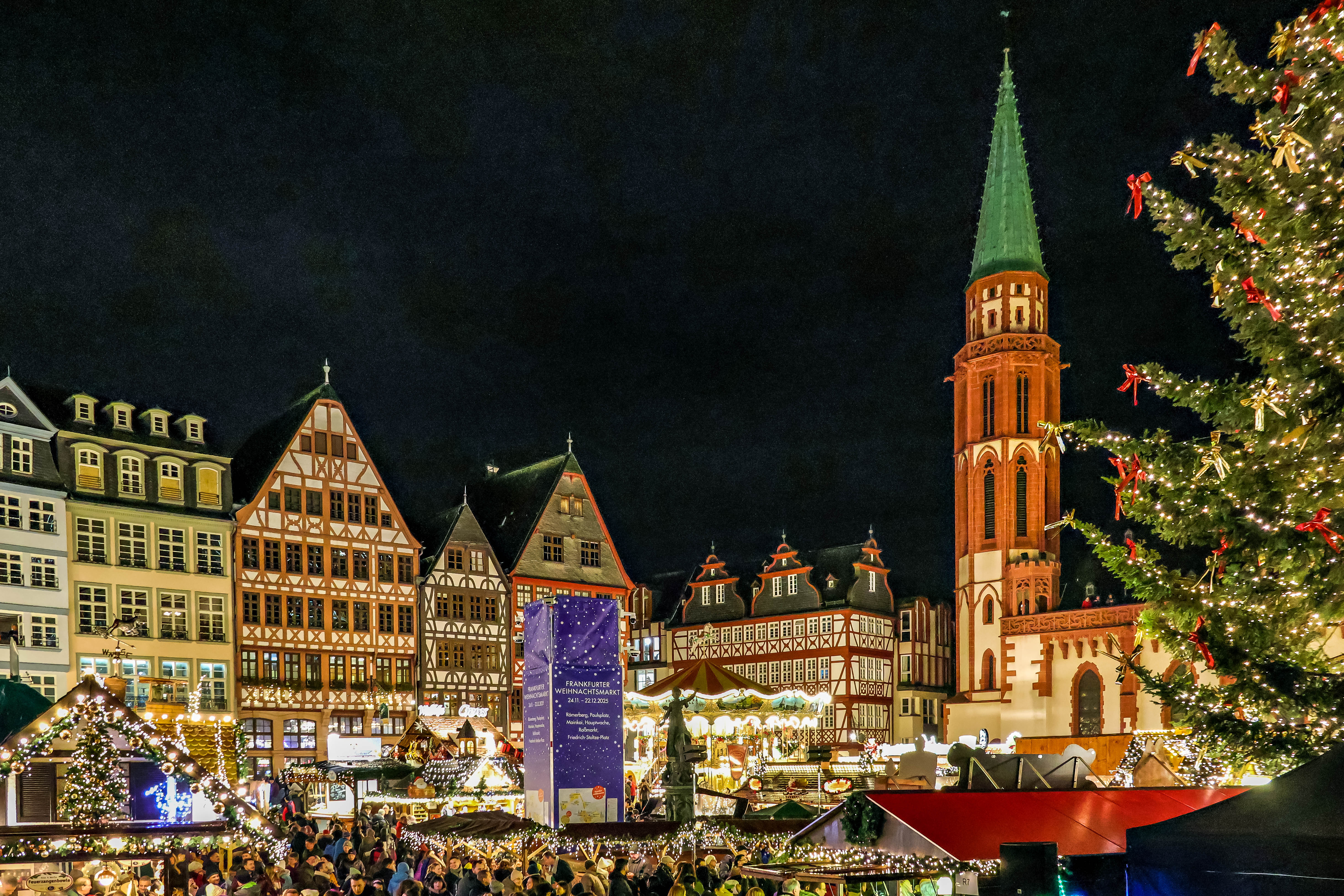
Frankfurt Christmas Market on the Römerberg

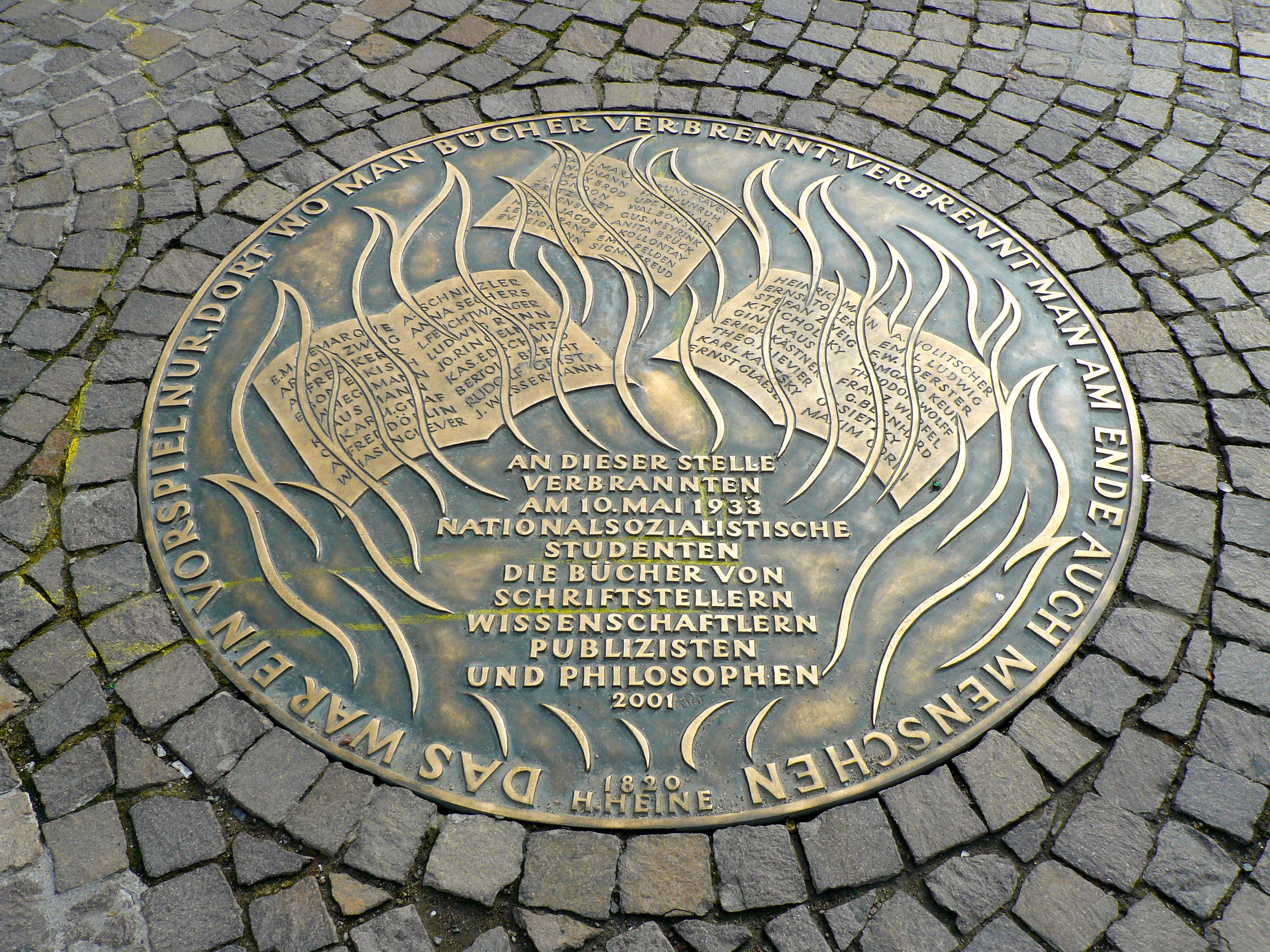
A plaque commemorating the book burning of 1933

Römer Frankfurt
Römer, town hall Frankfurt am Main
1 Zum Römer
2 Löwenstein
3 Frauenstein
4 Salzhaus
5 Wanebach
6 Zum goldenen Schwan
7 Bürgersaalbau
8 Silberberg
9 Alt-Limpurg / Laderam
10 Neues Rathaus (new town hall)
11 Seufzerbrücke (bridge of sighs)
12 Römerberg (square)
13 Paulsplatz (square)
