= Salzhaus =

Coordinates: 50.1108°N 8.6819°E

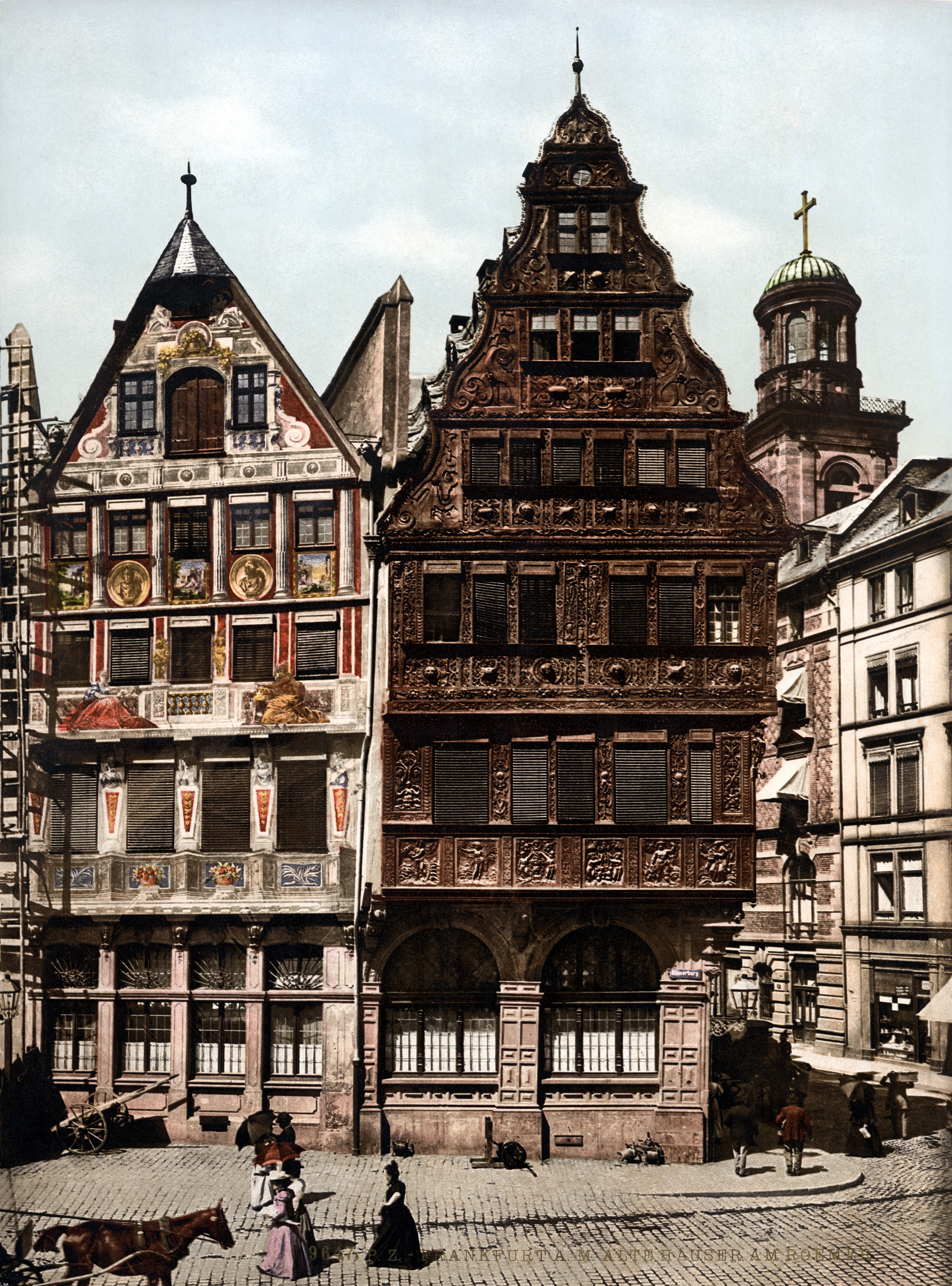
Colour image of the historic facade of the Salzhaus (right) on the Römerberg square, around 1896.

The Salzhaus (English: Salt House) is a historic building in the German city of Frankfurt am Main. It forms the northeastern part of the Frankfurt City Hall complex (Römer), on the Römerberg square in the centre of the Altstadt (old town).

The Salzhaus was originally built around 1600. It had a rich carved façade on the gable side, making it not only the most important artisan-produced civil building in the city, but also one of the greatest achievements of the Renaissance in the German-speaking world. This building was largely destroyed in Second World War by aerial bombing in March 1944. The base of the old building was preserved, but the floors above it were rebuilt in 1951/52 in a simple post-war architectural form. The reconstruction of the historic facade is still under discussion; it was considered in the 1980s along with a row of houses on the other side of the square (the Ostzeile) but was not carried out. Since then, the organisation Friends of Frankfurt has continued this discussion.

== Historic architecture ==
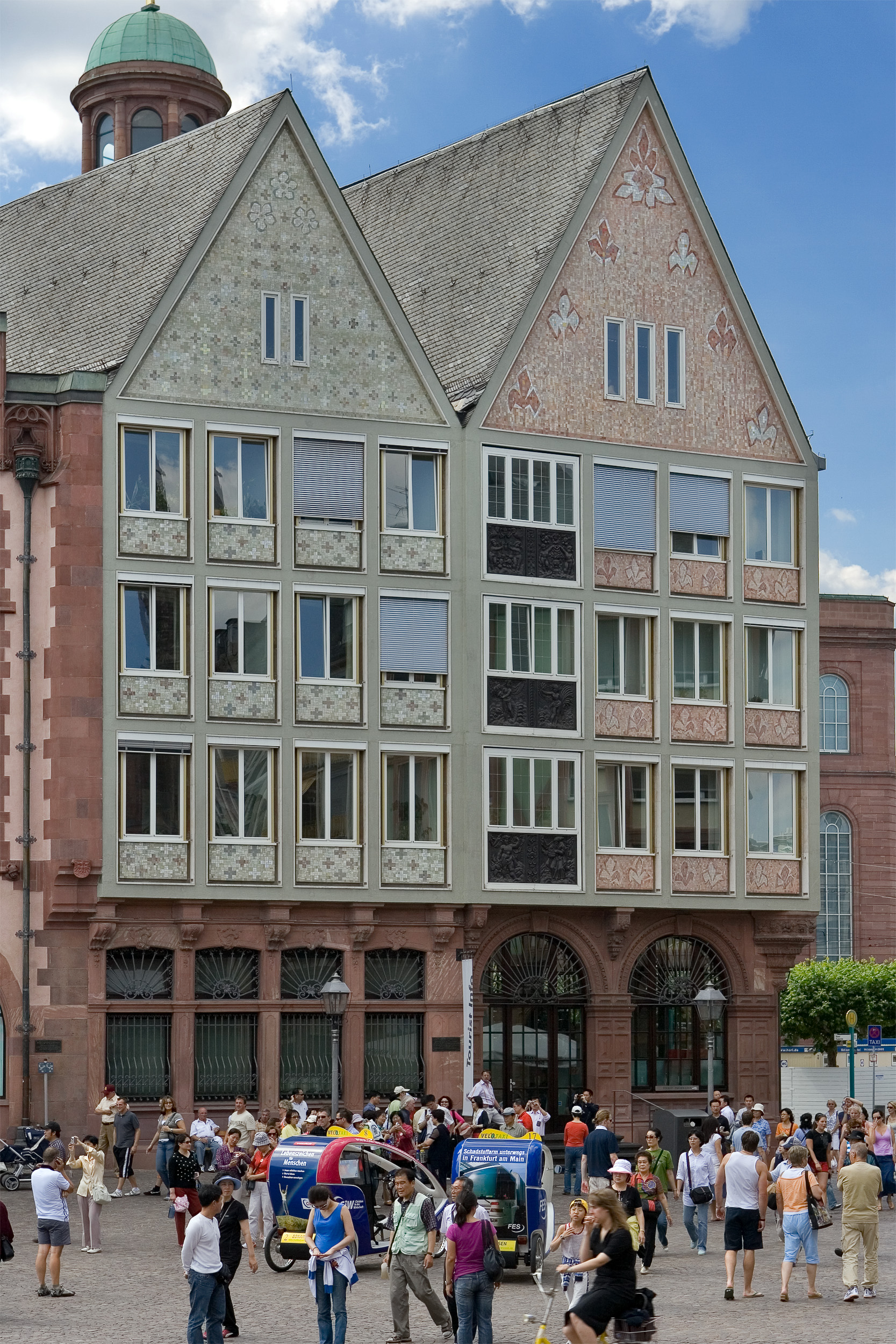
View of the Salzhaus today

Like most of the buildings in Frankfurt's old town, the Salzhaus was built on a massive ground floor made of local red sandstone. As the only part of the building that has been preserved almost holistically to this day, the mastery of the Frankfurt stone masonry is still evident today.

The half-timbered part of the building rose above the stone ground floor into two upper and upper cantilever levels, cantilevering north and east. From the ground floor to the gable, the building was 22 metres high, and at the widest point only 10 metres across. The fact that the roof structure alone made up almost half of the total height of the building emphasised the late Gothic proportions, despite the rich Renaissance decorations.

Probably shortly after 1595 the house was completely redesigned in the style of the late Renaissance, or probably even completely rebuilt. From then on, the Salzhaus was considered one of the most beautiful buildings in Central Europe.

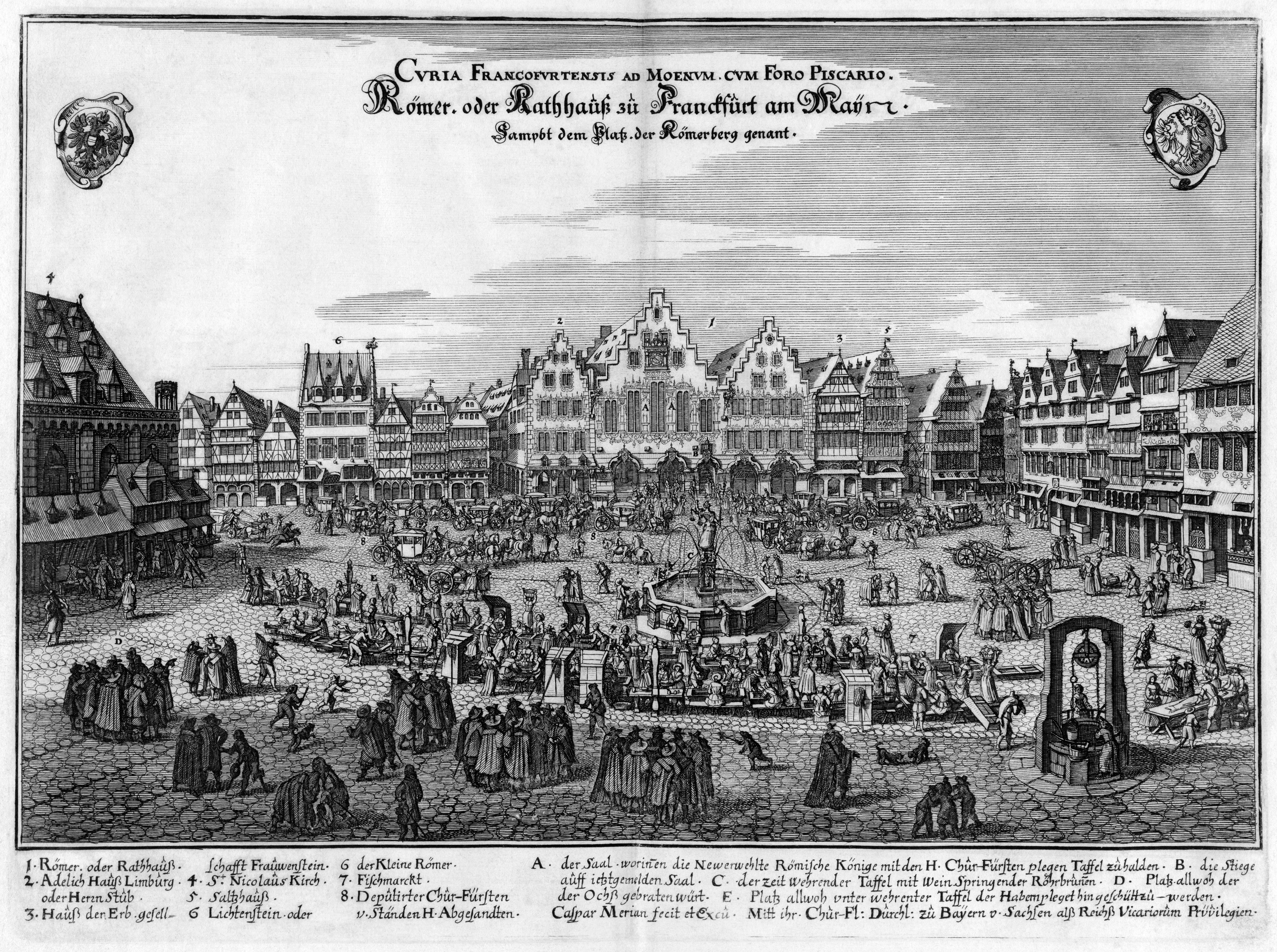
Coronation picture from 1658

In terms of quality, the Kammerzell House in Strasbourg is comparable, since it was similarly redesigned in 1589, but in contrast it survived not only the Franco-Prussian war, but also both world wars without damage.

== History ==
The first mention of the building goes back to a document dated 5 May 1324. It was being referred to as the Salzhaus in various documents in the 14th century, which derived from the salt trade taking place there.

Until the early 17th century there were likely two independent, very narrow half-timbered buildings on the plot, commonly known as the Salzhaus. This is shown by pictures of the Römerberg from various older coronation records.

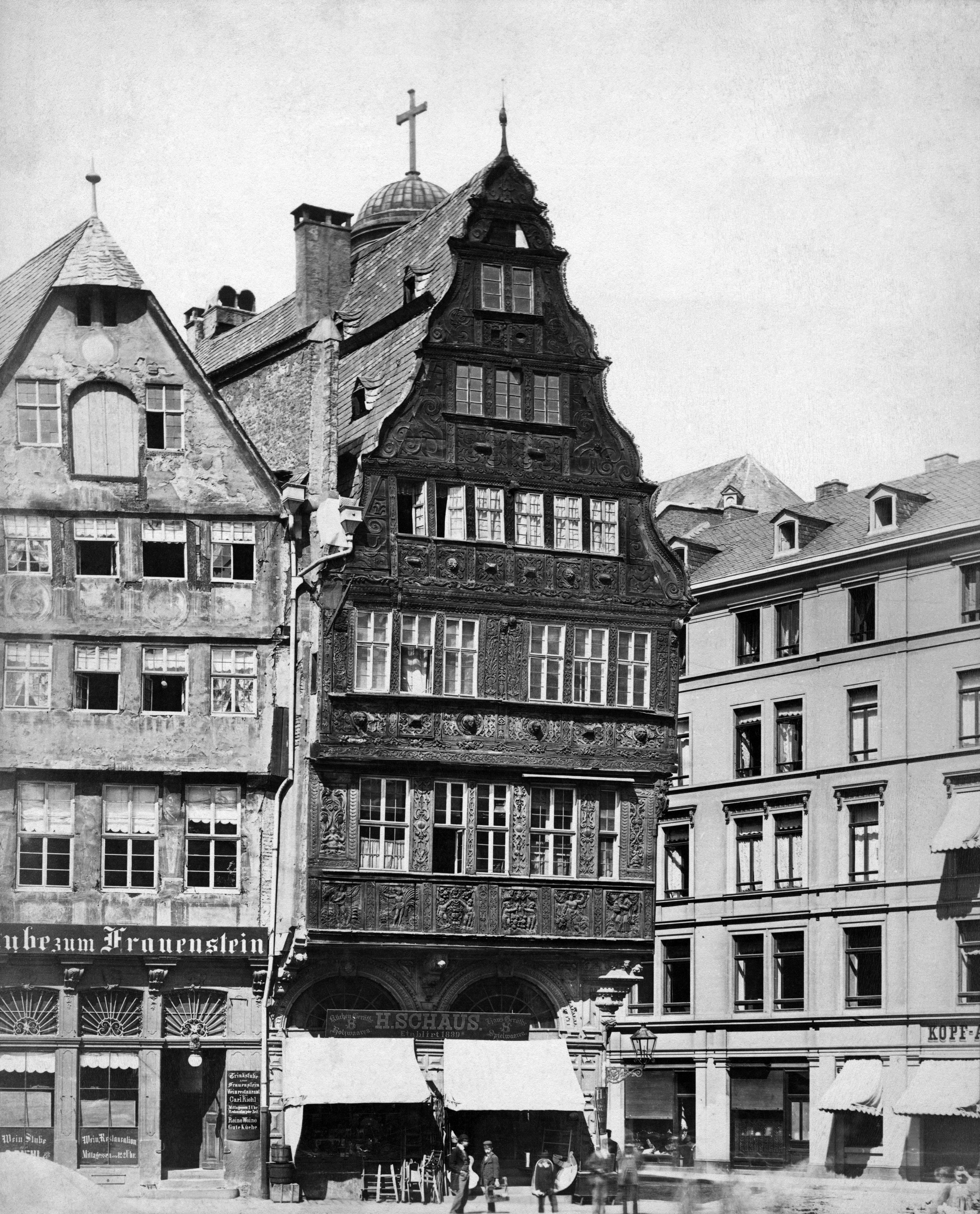
The Salzhaus in need of renovation, before 1887

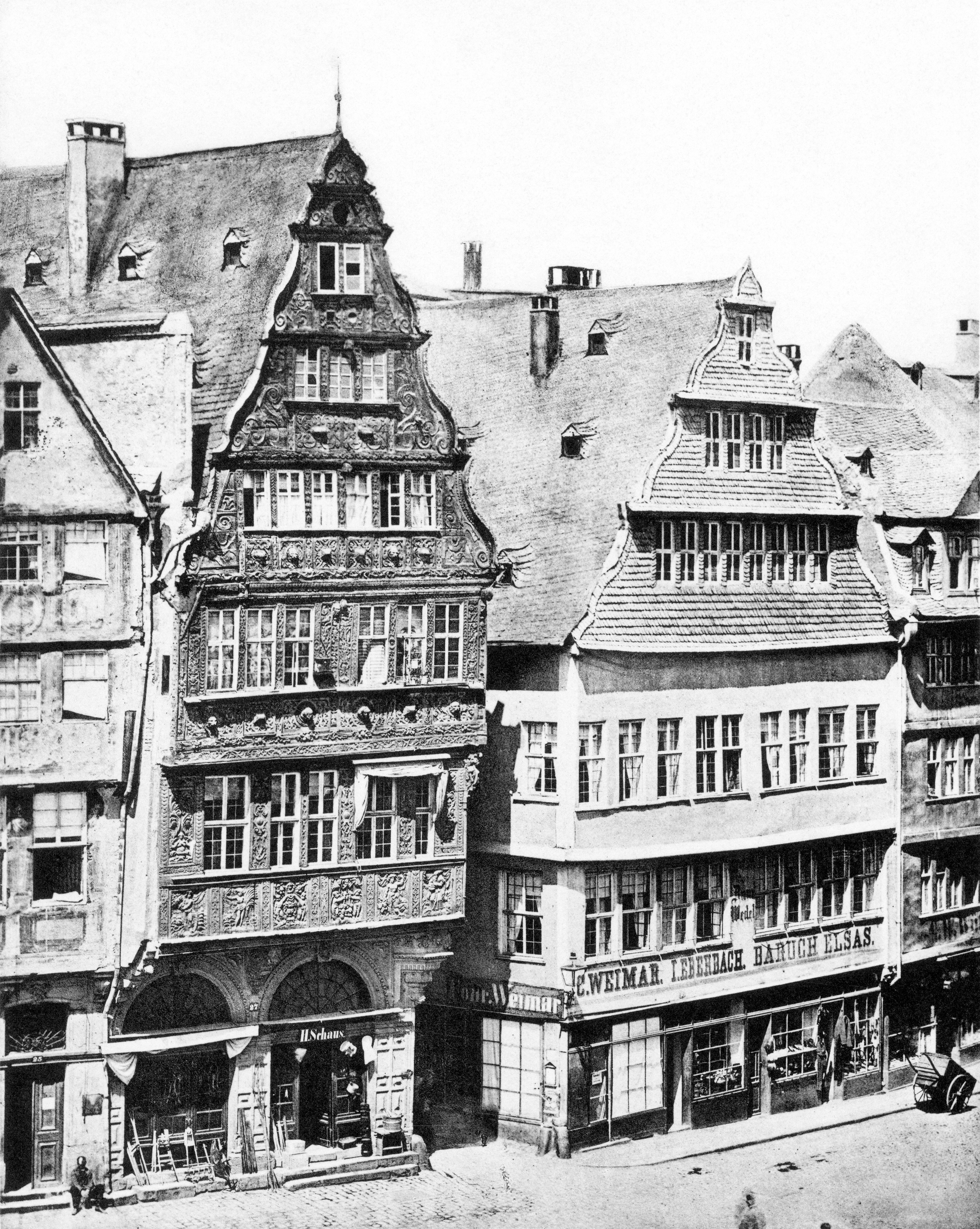
Frauenstein House, Salzhaus and Haus zum Wedel, 1860

On 1 May 1843, the city acquired the house and integrated it with the house adjoining it to create a building complex around the Römerberg square.

In the years 1887 to 1888, urgently needed renovation work took place. City officials moved into the house in 1890.

== Destruction in the Second World War ==
In the Second World War it became apparent from July 1942 at the latest that Frankfurt would also be the target of heavy bombing. A large part of the historically significant buildings in the old town of Frankfurt were then documented and immovable art monuments were walled in or had the historic parts removed. This included all removable relief panels from the Salzhaus – only the carvings worked into the supporting beams of the actual half-timbered house remain on site.

On 5 October 1943, the first heavy bomb attack hit the city centre. Incendiary bombs devastated the interior of the Roman and the civil hall. The neighbouring salt house was initially spared. On 18 March 1944, about 750 aircraft attacked the eastern city centre. The Salzhaus remained undamaged again, although the Paulskirche on the opposite side of the street was hit and burned out completely.

On 22 March, the heaviest air raid hit the old town. More than seven thousand buildings were destroyed or badly damaged. The Salzhaus was also hit by incendiary bombs and burned down. The entire interior was lost; only parts of the stone basement remained.

=== Post-war building to the present ===
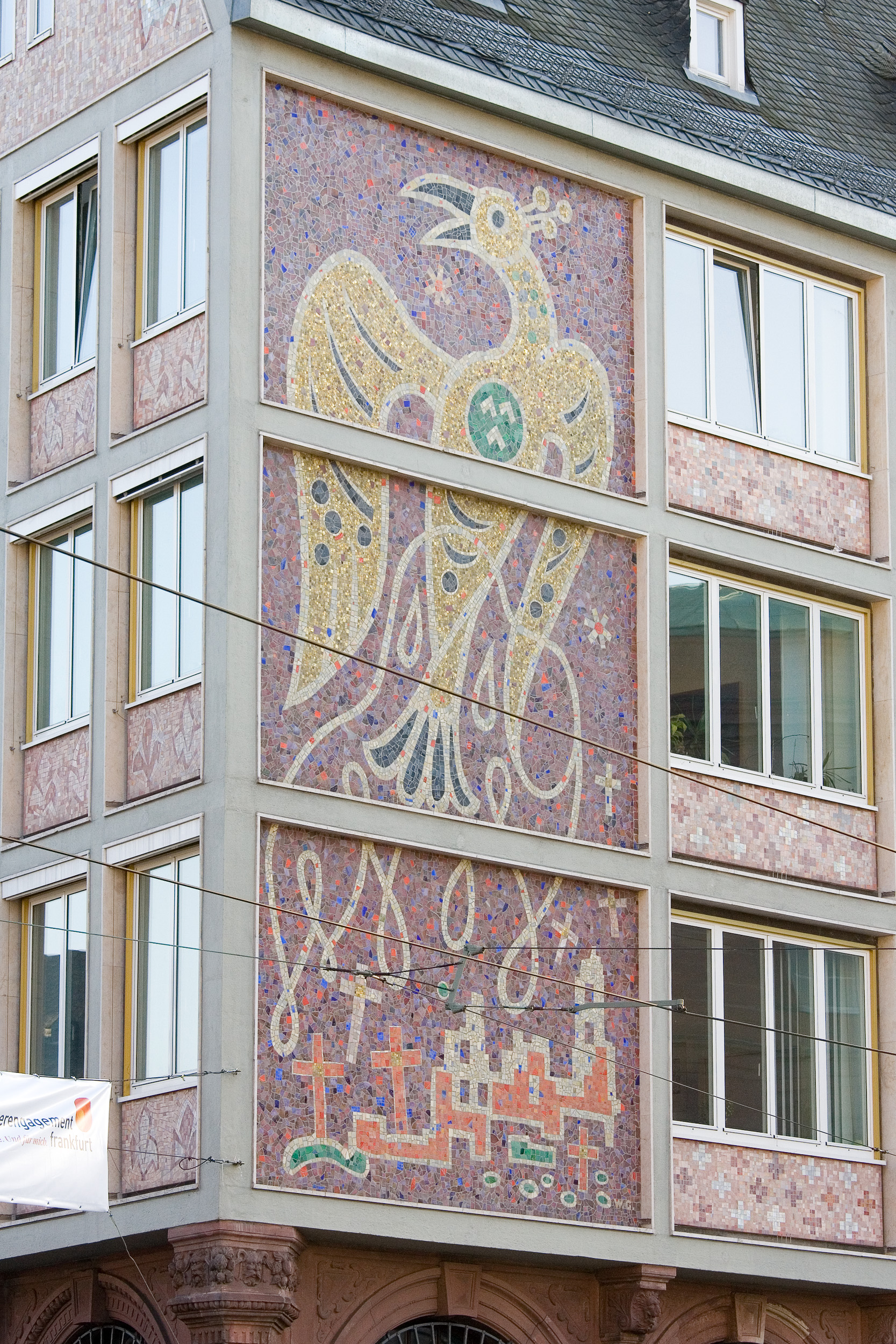
Mosaic of the Phoenix from the Ashes, 2007

In 1946, work began on clearing the debris in the old town. By 1950 the rubble and ruins had been completely removed. In that time the decision had been made for a modern reconstruction based on the ideas of urban planning at the time. The "New Salzhaus" was completed in 1952.

There was a serious discussion about the pros and cons of a possible reconstruction of the Salzhaus. However, there was an architectural community and also large parts of politics, which were opposed to "historicism of the romantic kind" (Mayor Kurt Blaum), and still a great shortage of materials and finance.

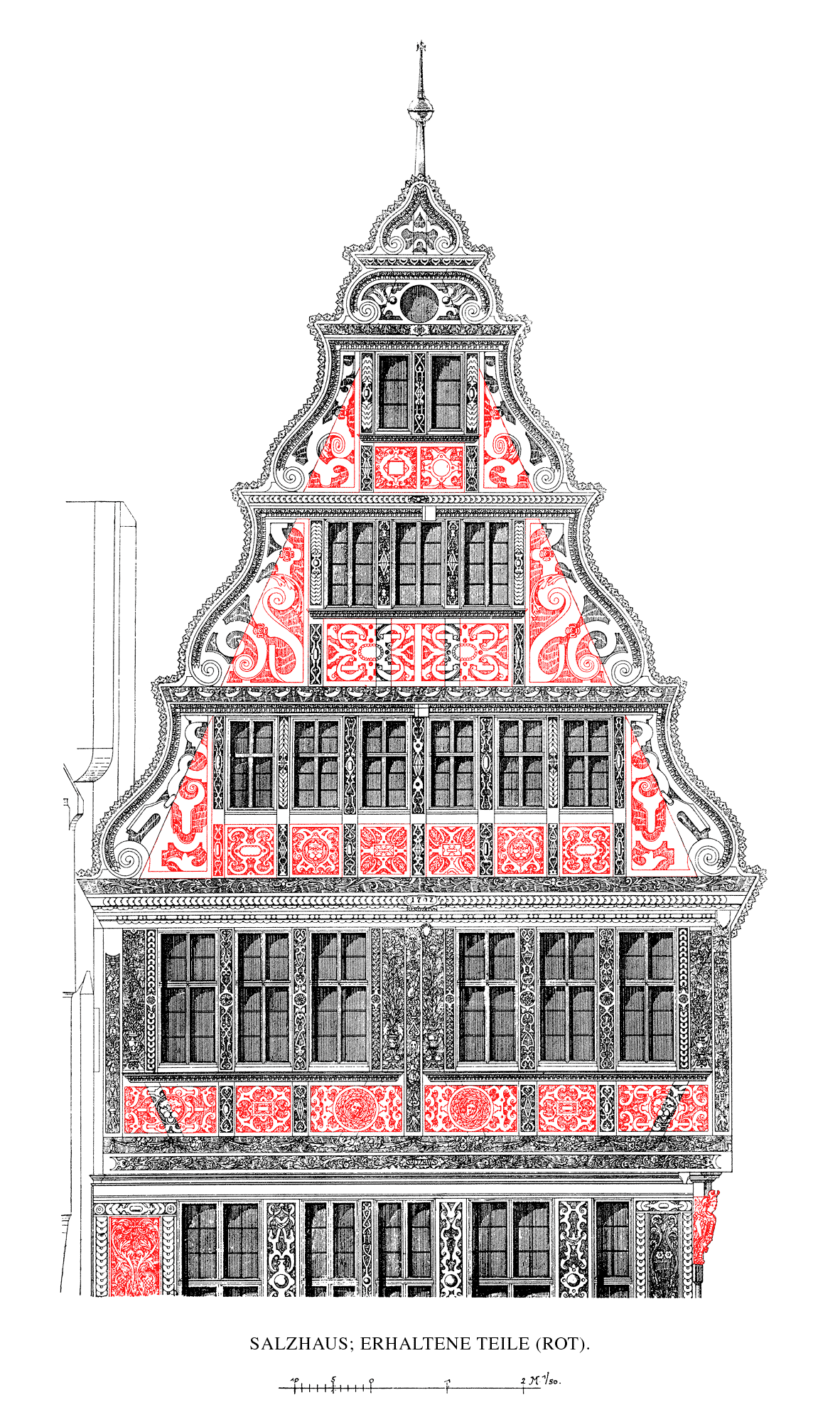
Preserved parts of the facade

Nevertheless, the new Salzhaus belongs to the small number of buildings from the early 1950s that are to be regarded as an artistic contribution of a time that is primarily determined by material constraints.

The "Salzhaus" of the post-war period is a modern reinforced concrete building on the preserved ground floor of the previous building. The decoration of the new building, on the other hand, is unusually rich for the time it was built. Below the windows there is limestone cladding, the eastern side is occupied by a glass mosaic spanning the three full storeys by the artist Wilhelm Geißler. It is intended to symbolise the mood of development and departure after the war and shows the motif of the phoenix from the ashes.

Today the city's Salzhaus serves as an administration building with an information centre for tourists on the ground floor.

=== Possible reconstruction ===
In the 1980s, there were efforts by citizens to rebuild the Salzhaus true to the original. This did not happen owing to a lack of money. An exhibition of the fragments in the Historisches Museum Frankfurt in December 2004 also showed that not as much building substance was lost in the Second World War as is generally assumed – around 60% of the facade is still intact in city archives.

== Literature ==
- Architects & Engineers Association (ed.): Frankfurt am Main and its buildings. Self-published by the association, Frankfurt am Main 1886
- Johann Georg Battonn: Local Description of the City of Frankfurt am Main – Volume IV. Association for History and Ancient History of Frankfurt am Main, Frankfurt am Main 1866, pp. 142–143
- Hartwig Beseler, Niels Gutschow: Fates of War in German Architecture – Losses, Damages, Reconstruction – Volume 2, South. Karl Wachholtz Verlag, Neumünster 1988, p. 812
- Georg Hartmann, Fried Lübbecke (ed.): Old Frankfurt. A legacy. Verlag Sauer and Auvermann, Glashütten 1971, pp. 72–77
- Hermann Heimpel: The salt house on Römerberg. In: Frankfurter Verkehrsverein (ed.): Frankfurter Wochenschau. Bodet & Link, Frankfurt am Main 1939, pp. 152–156
- Historical museum presents the art of carving from the "Salzhaus". In: Frankfurter Allgemeine: Newspaper for Germany (ed.), Frankfurt am Main 9 November 2004
- Walter Sage: The community center in Frankfurt a. M. until the end of the Thirty Years' War. Wasmuth, Tübingen 1959 (Das Deutsche Bürgerhaus 2), pp. 96–99
- Carl Wolff, Rudolf Jung: The Architectural Monuments of Frankfurt am Main – Volume 2, Secular Buildings. Selbstverlag / Völcker, Frankfurt am Main 1898, pp. 239–245
