= Ricardo =

- Pronunciation: Spanish: [riˈkaɾðo] Portuguese: [ʁiˈkaɾðu]
- Gender: Male

Origin
- Languages: Spanish, Portuguese
- Meaning: 'strong in rule'

Other names
- Related names: Riccardo, Richard, Rick, Chico

Ricardo is the Spanish and Portuguese cognate of the name Richard. It derived from Proto-Germanic *rīks 'king, ruler' + *harduz 'hard, brave'. It may be a given name, or a surname.

== People ==
=== Given name ===
- Ricardo Alafim de Freitas (born 1988), Brazilian para-cyclist
- Ricardo Araújo Pereira (born 1974), Portuguese comedian
- Ricardo Arjona (born 1964), Guatemalan singer
- Ricardo Arona (born 1978), Brazilian mixed martial artist
- Ricardo Ávila (born 1997), Panamanian footballer
- Ricardo Berzoini (born 1960), Brazilian unionist and politician
- Ricardo Bierhals (born 1990), Brazilian footballer
- Ricardo Bralo (1916–?), Argentine long-distance runner
- Ricardo Bombine Pimentel (born 1978), Brazilian musician
- Ricardo Bueno Fernández (1940–2015), Spanish politician
- Ricardo Busquets (born 1974), Puerto Rican swimmer
- Ricardo Cardeño (born 1971), Colombian triathlete
- Ricardo Carvalho (born 1978), Portuguese footballer
- Ricardo Coelho (born 1998), Portuguese marathon canoeist
- Ricardo Conceição (born 1984), Brazilian footballer
- Ricardo Concepción Rodríguez (born 1965), Cuban politician
- Ricardo Cortez (1900–1977), American actor
- Ricardo Darín (born 1957), Argentine actor
- Ricardo da Silva (born 1980), Cape Verdean-Portuguese footballer
- Ricardo Guilherme Dicke (1936–2008), Brazilian writer
- Ricardo Esgaio, Portuguese footballer
- Ricardo Faty (born 1986), Senegalese footballer
- Ricardo Fischer (born 1991), Brazilian basketball player
- Ricardo Fortaleza (born 1951), Filipino-Australian boxer
- Ricardo Fuller (born 1979), Jamaican football (soccer) player
- Ricardo A. "Rick" Galindo, American politician
- Ricardo Gangeme (1943–1999), Argentine journalist and founder of El Informador Chubutense
- Ricardo Gomes (born 1964), Brazilian footballer
- Ricardo González (golfer) (born 1969), Argentine golf player
- Ricardo González (racing driver) (born 1977), Mexican racing driver
- Ricardo Gónzalez Reinoso (born 1965), retired Chilean footballer
- Ricardo Gutierrez (born 1955), American actor
- Ricardo Izar (born 1968), Brazilian politician
- Ricardo Larrivée (born 1967), Canadian chef
- Ricardo López (born 1966), Mexican professional boxer
- Ricardo Hallman (born 2003), American football player
- Ricardo Hausmann (born 1956), Venezuelan politician and professor at Harvard
- Ricardo Hurtado (born 1999), American actor
- Ricardo Izecson dos Santos Leite (born 1982), better known as Kaká, Brazilian footballer
- Ricardo James (born 1966), Panamaian footballer
- Ricardo Lagos (born 1938), Chilean socialist politician and former president
- Ricardo Larrivée (born 1967), French-Canadian TV and radio food presenter and writer
- Ricardo Lee (born 1948), Filipino screenwriter, journalist, novelist, and playwright
- Ricardo P. Lloyd (born 1993), British actor
- Ricardo Londoño (1949–2009), Colombian racing driver
- Ricardo López Felipe (born 1971), Spanish football goalkeeper
- Ricardo Macarrón (1926–2004), Spanish painter
- Ricardo Malajika (born 1998), South African professional boxer
- Ricardo Mangue Obama Nfubea (born 1961), former Prime Minister of Equatorial Guinea
- Ricardo Marsh (born 1981), American basketball player, 2007 top scorer in the Israel Basketball Premier League
- Ricardo Martínez (born 1980), Mexican footballer
- Ricardo Matosinhos (born 1982), Portuguese hornplayer and pedagogue
- Ricardo Maurício (born 1979), Brazilian racing driver
- Ricardo Montalbán (1920–2009), Mexican actor
- Ricardo Montez (1923–2010), Gibraltarian actor
- Ricardo Medina Jr. (born 1979), American actor
- Ricardo Menéndez March (born 1987/1988), New Zealand politician
- Ricardo Miranda (born 1976), Canadian politician and trade unionist
- Ricardo Montaner (born 1957), Argentine-born singer
- Ricardo Morales (intelligence agent), Cuban exile and CIA agent
- Ricardo Mthembu (1970–2020), South African politician
- Ricardo Nascimento (born 1974), Portuguese footballer
- Ricardo Palma (1833–1919), Peruvian author
- Ricardo Pereira (actor) (born 1979), Portuguese actor, television presenter and fashion model
- Ricardo Alexandre Martins Soares Pereira (born 1976), Portuguese football goalkeeper
- Ricardo Pietreczko (born 1994), German professional darts player
- Ricardo Pinto (disambiguation), multiple people
- Ricardo Puno (1923–2018), Filipino lawyer
- Ricardo Quaresma (born 1983), Portuguese footballer
- Ricardo Rodriguez (disambiguation), multiple people
- Ricardo Rosset (born 1968), Brazilian racing driver
- Ricardo Salampessy (born 1984), Indonesian footballer
- Ricardo Sanabria (born 1969), Paraguayan footballer
- Ricardo Sánchez (water polo) (born 1971), Spanish water polo player
- Ricardo Santos (disambiguation), multiple people
- Ricardo Schnetzer (1953–2026), Brazilian voice actor
- Ricardo Senn (1931–2012), Argentine cyclist
- Ricardo Silva (politician) (born 1985), Brazilian politician
- Ricardo Sperafico (born 1979), Brazilian racing driver
- Ricardo Teixeira (racing driver) (born 1984), Angolan racing driver
- Ricardo Toledo Carranza (born 1958), Costa Rican politician
- Ricardo Viera (1945–2020) Cuban-born American visual artist, educator, curator
- Ricardo Villagrán (born 1938), Argentine illustrator
- Ricardo Villalobos (born 1970), Chilean electronic musician
- Ricardo Zampieri (born 1995), Brazilian politician
- Ricardo Zonta (born 1976), Brazilian racing driver
- Ricardo Zunino (born 1949), Argentine racing driver

=== Nickname ===
- Richard Møller Nielsen (1937–2014), Danish football manager whose team won the Euro 1992

=== Last name ===
- Amy Mary Ricardo, birth name of Amy Gordon-Lennox, Countess of March (1847–1879), British aristocrat
- Cicely Kate Ricardo, birth name of Kate Bertram (1912–1999), British ichthyologist
- David Ricardo (1772–1823), British economist
- David Ricardo (the younger) (1803–1864), British Liberal Member of Parliament
- Colonel Francis Cecil Ricardo (1852–1924), British army officer, police officer and philanthropist (brother of Horace Ricardo)
- Halsey Ricardo (1854–1928), English architect and designer
- Sir Harry Ricardo (1885–1974), British motor engineer who established Ricardo Consulting Engineers
- Colonel Horace Ricardo (1850–1935), British army officer and land owner (brother of Francis Cecil Ricardo)
- James Ricardo, American film director
- John Lewis Ricardo (1812–1862), British businessman and politician
- Osman Ricardo (1795–1881), British Liberal and Whig politician
- Paulo Ricardo (disambiguation), multiple people

== Fictional characters ==
- Richard Alpert (Lost), on the Lost TV series
- Ricardo Diaz, from the Grand Theft Auto: Vice City video game
- Lucy and Ricky Ricardo, main characters on the I Love Lucy TV series
- Ricardo Dalisay, the primary protagonist in the Ang Probinsyano TV series
- Ricardo Tubbs, on the TV series Miami Vice
- Ricardo (comic book character), the main antagonist from The Adventures of Nero comic book series
- Ricardio, a character who is a heart from Ice King’s body in the animated series Adventure Time

== See also ==
- Riccardo
- Daniel Ricciardo
