= Ricardinho =

Ricardinho is the Portuguese diminutive of the name Ricardo.

Ricardinho may refer to:

== Sportspeople ==
=== Football ===
- Ricardinho (footballer, born 1975), born Ricardo Souza Silva, Brazilian football attacking midfielder
- Ricardinho (footballer, born May 1976), born Ricardo Luis Pozzi Rodrigues, Brazilian football manager and former footballer
- Ricardinho (footballer, born June 1976), born Ricardo Alexandre dos Santos, Brazilian football defensive midfielder
- Ricardinho (footballer, born 1978), born Cicero Ricardo de Souza, Brazilian football forward
- Ricardinho (footballer, born January 1982), born Ricardo Andrade Alves, Brazilian football forward
- Ricardinho (footballer, born November 1982), born Ricardo Alves Fernandes, Brazilian football midfielder
- Ricardinho (footballer, born 1983), born Ricardo Weslei de Campelo, Brazilian football forward
- Ricardinho (footballer, born May 1984), born José Ricardo dos Santos Oliveira, Brazilian football striker
- Ricardinho (footballer, born September 1984), born Ricardo Ferreira da Silva Kubitski, Brazilian football left-back
- Ricardinho (footballer, born 1985), born Ricardo Dias Acosta, Brazilian football midfielder
- Ricardinho (footballer, born May 1986), born Ricardo Martins Pereira, Equatoguinean football striker
- Ricardinho Paraiba (born 1986), born Ricardo Ferreira da Silva, Brazilian football forward
- Ricardinho (footballer, born 1988), born Ricardo Alves Pereira, Brazilian football striker
- Ricardinho (footballer, born March 1989), born Ricardo Ribeiro de Lima, Brazilian football defensive midfielder
- Ricardinho (footballer, born June 1989), born Ricardo Silva de Almeida, Brazilian football midfielder
- Ricardinho (footballer, born September 1989), born Ricardo Cavalcante Mendes, Brazilian football striker
- Ricardinho (footballer, born 1994), born Ricardo José Veiga Varzim Miranda, Portuguese football right-back
- Ricardinho (footballer, born 1998), born Ricardo Jorge Oliveira António, Portuguese football midfielder
- Ricardinho (freestyle football) (born 1998), born Ricardo Fabiano Chahini de Araujo, Brazilian freestyle footballer
- Ricardinho (footballer, born 2001), Ricardo Viana Filho
- Ricardinho (footballer, born 2005), born Ricardo Alexandre Gomes Simões, Portuguese footballer

=== Futsal ===
- Ricardinho (futsal player, born 1985), born Ricardo Filipe da Silva Braga, Portuguese futsal winger
- Ricardinho (futsal player, born 1991), born Ricardo Alberto de Jesus Pinto, Portuguese futsal universal

=== Blind football ===
- Ricardinho (Paralympic footballer), born Ricardo Steinmetz Alves, Brazilian football 5-a-side player

=== Jiu-jitsu ===
- Ricardinho (jiu-jitsu), born Ricardo Alcantara Vieira, Brazilian jiu-jitsu fighter

=== Volleyball ===
- Ricardinho (volleyball) (born 1975), born Ricardo Bermudez Garcia, Brazilian volleyball player

== See also ==
- Ricardo (disambiguation)
