= Dicke =

Dicke is a surname. Notable people with the surname include:

- Amie Dicke (born 1978), Dutch artist
- Finn Dicke (born 2004), Dutch footballer
- Gerd Dicke (born 1928), German Roman Catholic bishop
- Jip Dicke (born 2002), Dutch field hockey player
- Marcel Dicke (born 1957), Dutch entomologist
- Pien Dicke (born 1999), Dutch field hockey player
- Ricardo Guilherme Dicke (1936–2008), Brazilian writer
- Robert H. Dicke (1916–1997), American physicist
- Willem Karel Dicke (1905–1962), Dutch paediatrician

== See also ==
- Dick (disambiguation)
- Dicky (disambiguation)
