= Riccardo =

Riccardo is a male given name, Italian version of Ricardo or Richard. It also may be a surname. It means "Powerful Leader".

It may refer to:

== People ==
=== A–L ===
- Riccardo Agostini (born 1994), Italian racing driver
- Riccardo Antoniazzi (1853–1912), Italian violin maker
- Riccardo Bacchelli (1891–1985), writer
- Riccardo Barthelemy (1869–1955), Italian composer
- Riccardo Bauer (1896–1982), Italian journalist and politician
- Riccardo Bertazzolo (1903–1975), Italian boxer
- Riccardo Billi (1906–1982), Italian film actor and comedian
- Riccardo Bocchino (born 1988), Italian rugby union player
- Riccardo Bonetto (born 1979), Italian football player
- Riccardo Brengola (1917–2004), Italian violinist
- Riccardo Broschi (1698–1795), composer, brother of famous castrato singer Carlo Broschi
- Riccardo Burchielli (born 1975), Italian artist
- Riccardo Calimani (born 1946), Italian writer and historian
- Riccardo Campa (born 1967), Italian professor
- Riccardo Campogiani (1990–2007), Swedish assault victim
- Riccardo Carapellese (1922–1995), Italian football player and football manager
- Riccardo Cassin (1909–2009), Italian mountaineer
- Riccardo Chailly (born 1953), Italian conductor
- Riccardo Chiarini (born 1984), Italian road bicycle racer
- Riccardo Colombo (born 1982), Italian football player
- Riccardo Cocciante (born 1946), Italo-French singer, songwriter and composer
- Riccardo Corallo (born 1980), Italian football player
- Riccardo Cucciolla 1924–1999), Italian film actor
- Riccardo D'Auria (born 1940), Italian theoretical physicist
- Riccardo Divora (1908–1951), Italian rower
- Riccardo Drigo (1846–1930), Italian composer of ballet music and Italian Opera, a theatrical conductor and virtuoso pianist
- Riccardo Ferri (born 1963), Italian football player
- Riccardo Fissore (born 1980), Italian football player
- Riccardo Francolini, Panamanian banker
- Riccardo Francovich (1946–2007), Italian archaeologist
- Riccardo Freda (1909–1999), film director
- Riccardo Fogli (born 1947), Italian singer
- Riccardo Fontana (1947–2026), Italian Catholic prelate
- Riccardo Gabbiadini (born 1970), Welsh footballer
- Riccardo Galeazzi-Lisi (1891–1968), Italian medical doctor
- Riccardo Garrone (1926–2016), Italian actor
- Riccardo Garrone (1936–2013), Italian entrepreneur and football chairman
- Riccardo Giacconi (1931–2018), Italian-born American Nobel Prize-winning astrophysicist
- Riccardo Illy (born 1955), Italian businessman
- Riccardo Ingram (1966–2015), US baseball player and coach
- Riccardo Lanari, Italian electrical engineer
- Riccardo Lione (born 1972), Italian beach volleyball player
- Riccardo Lorello (born 2002), Italian speed skater

=== M–Z ===
- Riccardo Magrini (born 1954), Italian road bicycle racer
- Riccardo Maniero (born 1987), Italian football player
- Riccardo Marchesini (born 1963), Italian canoeist
- Riccardo Martin (1874–1952), American tenor
- Riccardo Maspero (born 1970), Italian football player
- Riccardo Materazzi (born 1963), Italian athlete
- Riccardo Meggiorini (born 1985), Italian football player
- Riccardo Meili (born 1982), footballer
- Riccardo Paternò di Montecupo (born 1945), Grand Chancellor of the Sovereign Military Order of Malta
- Riccardo Montolivo (born 1985), football player
- Riccardo Morandi (1902–1989), Italian civil engineer
- Riccardo Moscatelli (1971–1999), Italian race car driver
- Riccardo Muccioli (born 1974), football player from San Marino
- Riccardo Musconi, Italian Formula One engineer
- Riccardo Muti (born 1941), Italian conductor
- Riccardo Nardini (born 1983), Italian football player
- Riccardo Nencini (born 1959), Italian politician
- Riccardo Nielsen (1908–1982), Italian composer and music educator
- Riccardo Pacifici (1904–1943), Italian Sephardic Jew deported to Auschwitz during World War II
- Riccardo Paletti (1958–1982), Formula One driver
- Riccardo Pampuri (1897–1930), Italian medical doctor
- Riccardo Patrese (born 1954), Formula One driver
- Riccardo Pazzaglia (1926–2006), actor, film director, screenwriter and songwriter
- Riccardo Piacentini (born 1958), Italian composer and pianist
- Riccardo Pittis (born 1968), Italian basketball player
- Riccardo Ricciardi (born 1982), Italian politician and theater director
- Riccardo Riccò (born 1983), Italian road bicycle racer
- Riccardo Rognoni (c. 1550–1620), Italian composer and violinist
- Riccardo Romagnoli (born 1963), Italian auto racing driver
- Riccardo Rossi (born 1962), Italian actor, comedian and television presenter
- Riccardo Scamarcio (born 1979), Italian actor
- Riccardo Schicchi (1953–2012), Italian pornographer
- Riccardo Schöpf (born 2001), Austrian luger
- Riccardo Scimeca (born 1975), English footballer
- Riccardo di Segni (born 1949), chief rabbi of Rome
- Riccardo Silva (born 1970), Italian businessman
- Riccardo Simonetti (born 1993), German media personality and author
- Riccardo Sinigallia (born 1970), Italian singer, songwriter, and record producer
- Riccardo Staglianò (born 1968), Italian journalist
- Riccardo Stracciari (1875–1955), Italian baritone
- Riccardo Taddei (born 1980), Italian football player
- Riccardo Tesi (born 1956), Italian musician
- Riccardo Tisci (born 1974), Italian fashion designer
- Riccardo Torriani (1911–1988), Swiss ice hockey player and luger
- Riccardo Truccolo (born 1989), Italian basketball player
- Riccardo Tucci (born 1986), Italian politician
- Riccardo Ventre (born 1944), Italian politician
- Riccardo Villa (born 2005), Italian artistic gymnast
- Riccardo Zadra, Italian pianist
- Riccardo Zandonai (1883–1944), Italian opera composer
- Riccardo Zanella (1896–1947), Italian politician
- Riccardo Zampagna (born 1974), Italian footballer
- Riccardo Vianello or Raimondo Vianello (1922–2010), Italian film actor

== Other ==
- Riccardo Primo, or Riccardo Primo re d’Inghilterra, opera in three acts by George Frideric Handel
- Daniel Ricciardo, Australian Formula One driver

== See also ==
- Ricardo (disambiguation)
