= Saalgasse =

Street in Frankfurt

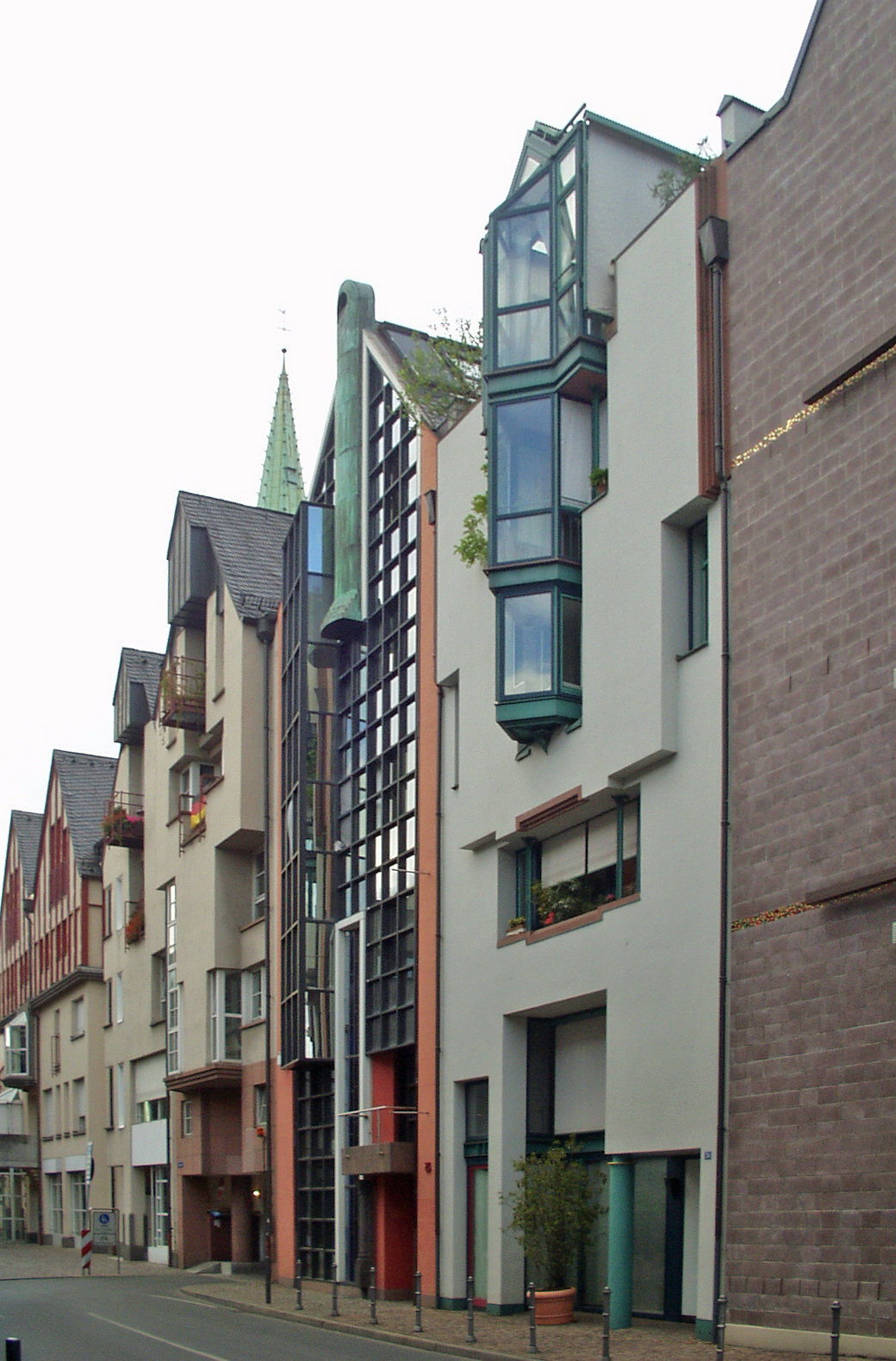
Postmodern buildings in Saalgasse

Saalgasse is one of the oldest streets in the Altstadt of Frankfurt am Main. It runs parallel to the bank of the Main. From the Middle Ages to the destruction of the city on 22 March 1944, Saalgasse, together with the more northerly Alte Markt and the central Bendergasse, formed one of the three east-west traffic axes of the Old Town.

Initially, the Jews of the city lived on the street. After they were murdered and expelled in 1349, the citizens of the city appropriated the houses. Initially, the street was called Saalhofgasse after the imposing Saalhof, but in the 17th–century it was shortened to Saalgasse. In the middle of the street was a small square called the Heilig-Geist-Plätzchen. The city was destroyed during the Second World War.

After the war, it was decided that with the exception of some important historical buildings, the old town would not be rebuilt. The Saalhof, the oldest building in the city, was restored. However, part of the Saalgasse remained undeveloped until the eighties when the Schirn Kunsthalle Frankfurt was built. Today it is an access road to a residential area from the 1950s; on its northern side there are post modern townhouses from the 1980s.
