= Amie Dicke =

Dutch artist

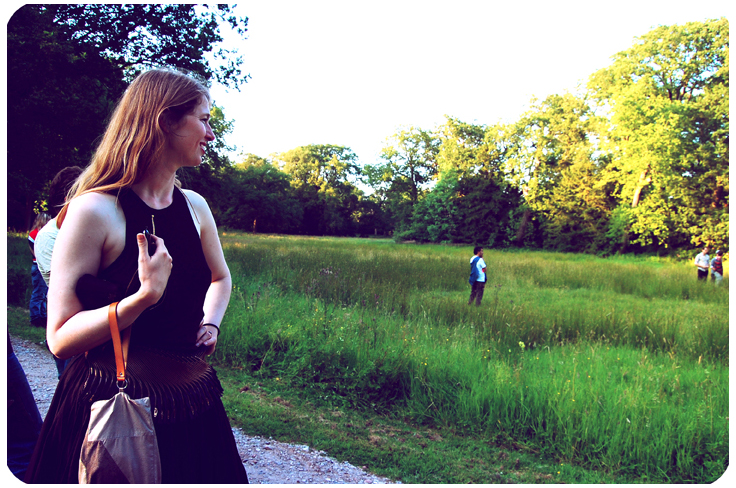
- Born: 1 April 1978 (age 48); Rotterdam
- Website: amiedicke.com

Amie Dicke (born 1 April 1978, Rotterdam) is an artist based in Amsterdam.

She completed her degree in Fine Art from the Willem de Kooning Academy of Fine Arts in Rotterdam. Dicke is known for her cut-out versions of fashion photos taken from glossy magazines.

Dicke's work has been shown internationally at galleries and museums including the Schirn Kunsthalle in Frankfurt, Germany, Tate Modern and Project Space 176 in London, FLAG Art Foundation, New York, and Art Centre Silkeborg Bad in Denmark.

In 2013, Anat Ebgi Gallery hosted Amie Dicke's first Los Angeles solo exhibition, "Collecting Alibis," . The show was featured in the LA Times , and Arts Holland .

In 2016, Anat Ebgi Gallery hosted Amie Dice's second LA solo exhibition, "Quote Unquote", . The show was featured in CRAVE and artillery .

In 2020, Dicke had her third exhibition with Anat Ebgi Gallery in Los Angeles, entitled "One-Liner" . The show was featured in Ocula and Galleries Now .

Her work is featured in several collections including the Zabludowicz Collection, Collection Rik Reinking, Takashi Murakami and the City Collection of Rotterdam through the Museum Boijmans van Beuningen.
