= Five-Finger Square =

Public square in Frankfurt, Germany

Coordinates: 50°06′37″N 8°40′59″E

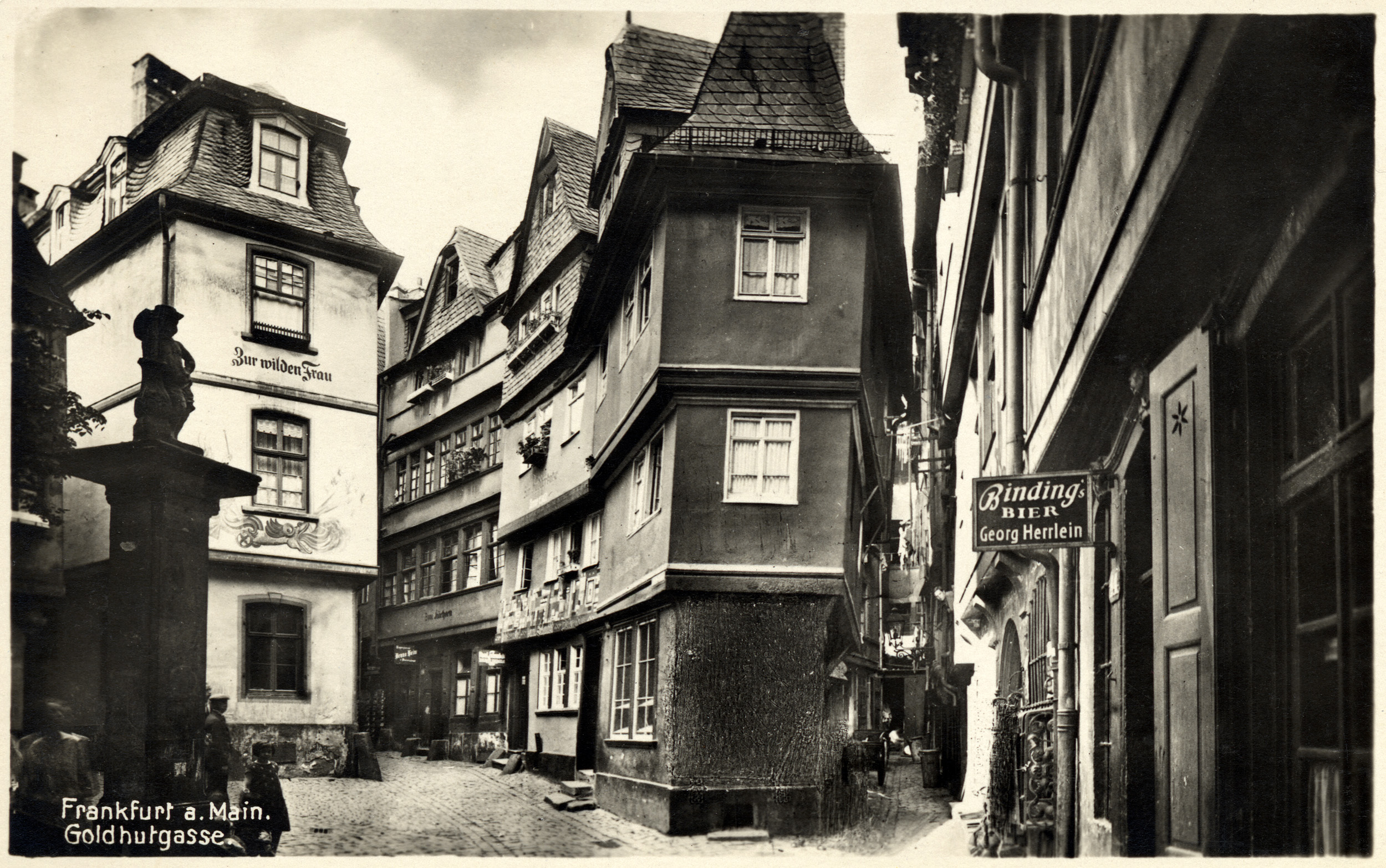
Frankfurt Five-Finger Square viewed towards Goldhutgasse.

The Five-Finger Square (German: Fünffingerplätzchen) was a small place in the old town of the German city of Frankfurt am Main, which was formed by the meeting of five narrow streets. It was east of the east line of the Römerberg market square, south of the market street, west of the Langen Schirn and north of Bendergasse. The popular postcard motif and tourist destination was destroyed in an air raid on March 22, 1944. Instead of a possible reconstruction, the city decided after the war to remove the rubble. The area was built over in the early 1970s and with the construction of the Römerberg-Ostzeile from 1981 to 1983 and the Kunsthalle Schirn from 1984 to 1986. The western entrance to the Schirn Rotunda is located on the site of the former Five-Finger Square, making reconstruction impossible.

== Origin, history and destruction ==
The appearance of the Five-Finger Square was unique for Frankfurt as well as in comparison with other medieval half-timbered towns. It was the central convergence point of several small streets; Schwertfegergässchen, Drachengässchen, Goldhutgasse and Flößergasse.

The Rapunzelgässchen, which ran directly behind what is today the Römerberg-Ostzeile, met the Flößergasse shortly before the entrance to the square. The name came from the fact that from a bird's eye view the very narrow passages of the old town or rows of buildings merged like the fingers of one hand.

Regarding the natural urban planning origin, two different theories are in balance: one follows the assumption that the north gate of the Merovingian Palatinate was located on the site of the five-finger square. Similar to later town planning in the Baroque era, the streets were laid out in a radial direction leading to the gate and were simply built over in the following centuries while maintaining this floor plan. The other theory argues that another large marketplace similar to the Römerberg was located on the site but in the early Middle Ages, the old town was short of space and the market was built over due to the shifting market activities.

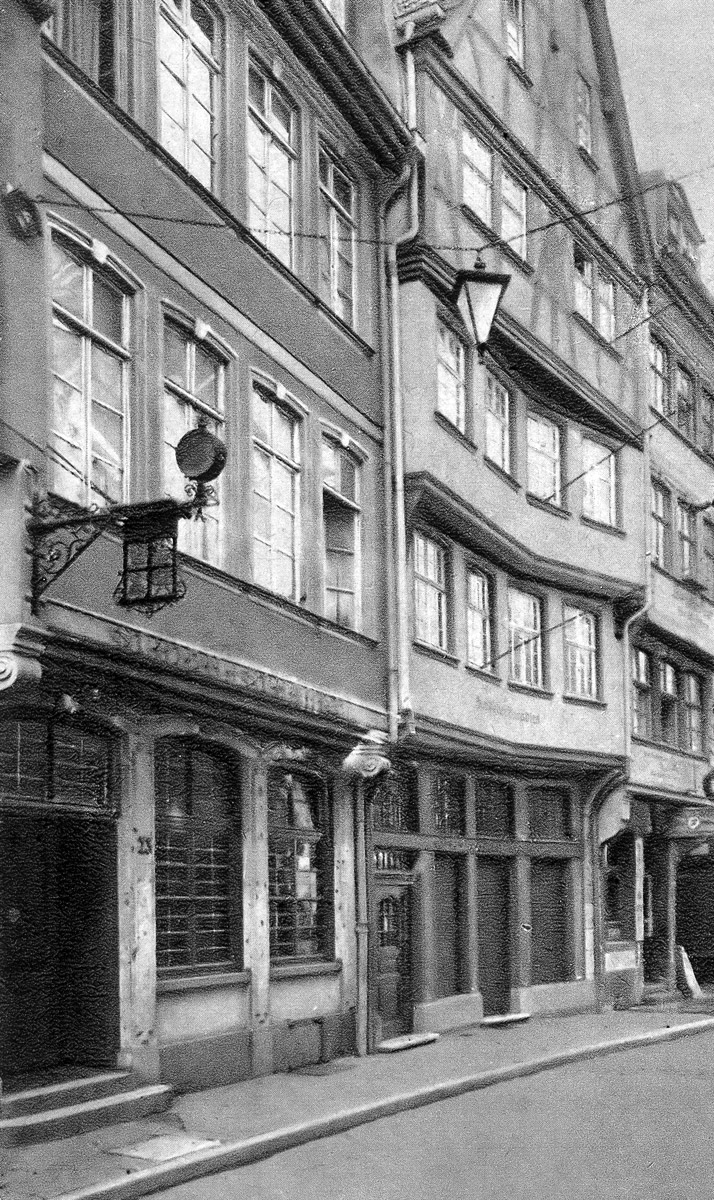
Kleines Paradies House on the market street, photo by CF Mylius, around 1890.

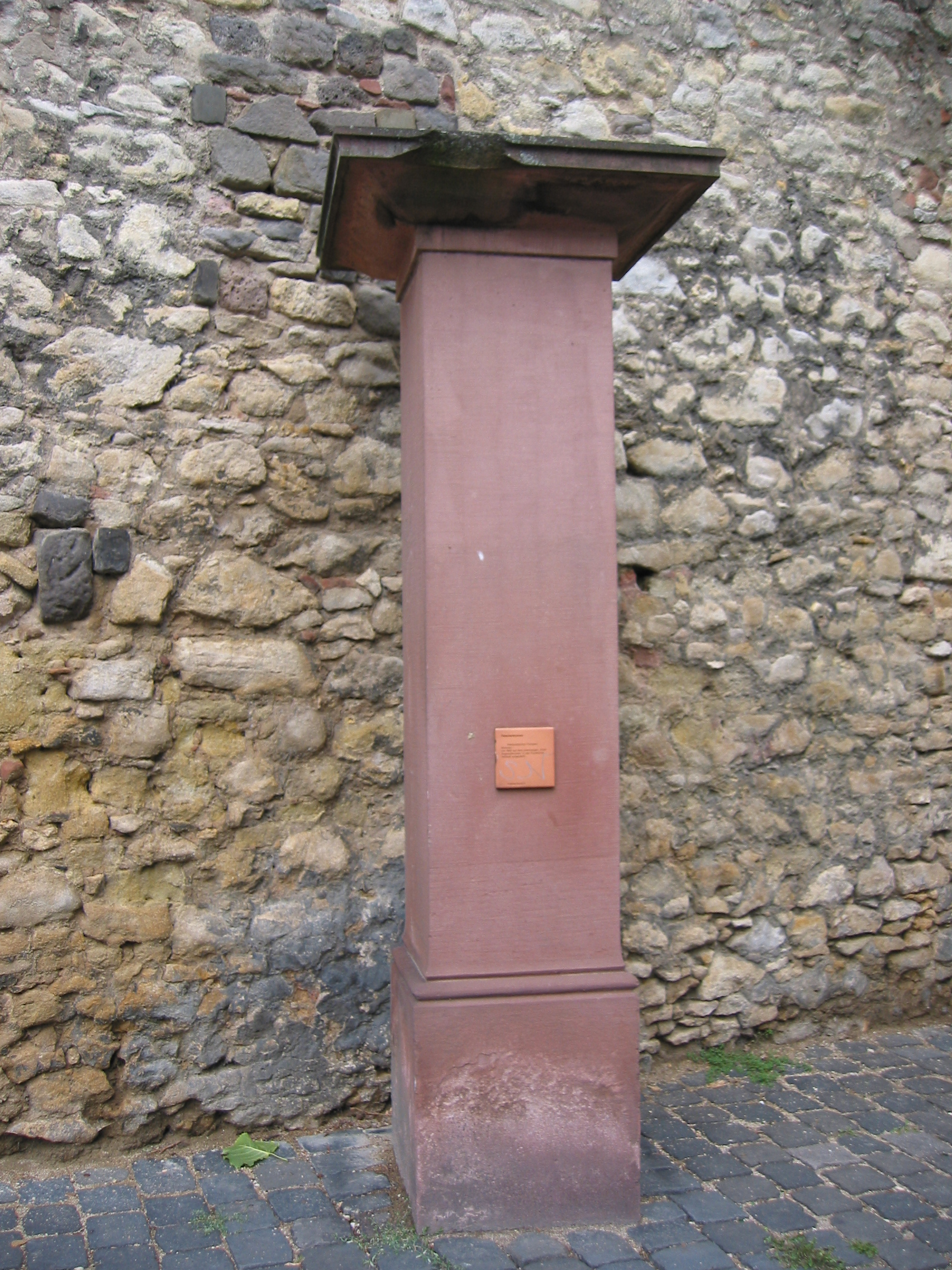
Fleischerbrunnen fountain in Sachsenhausen, before 2006.

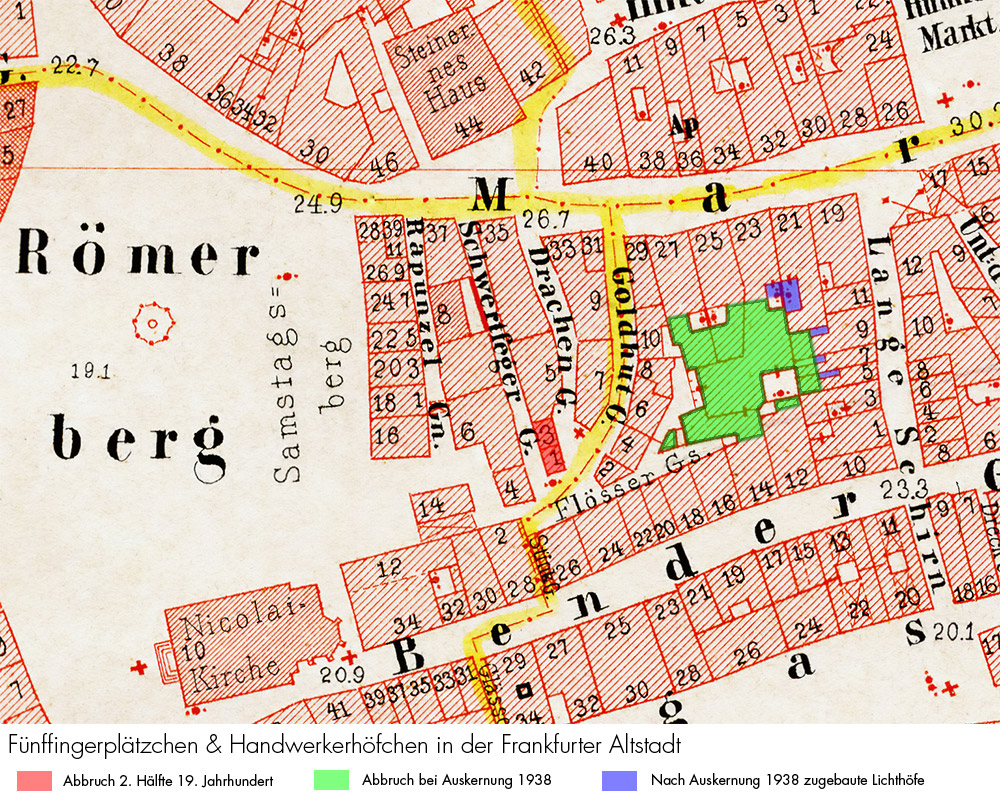
Squares and structural development on the Ravenstein plan of Frankfurt from 1862.

In the middle of the 14th century, as descriptions of the times detail, a further passage called Löhergasse ran east of Goldhutgasse from Flößergasse towards the market. Later development led to the southern part of the former Löhergasse becoming a back yard for the surrounding houses on the market, the Langen Schirn and the Bendergasse. The house Little Paradise (Street address: Markt 27 ) could be due to its remarkably bent front (see picture.): This was because it was half built on an original street entrance, as could still be seen by the 20th century.

On the other hand, the earliest surviving topographical representations of Frankfurt, such as the plan by Conrad Faber von Creuznach from 1552 or the famous bird 's eye view plan by Matthäus Merian the Elder from 1628, showed that Löhergasse was already overbuilt and the Five-Finger Square was therefore almost in the same condition as it was in the 20th century. Accordingly, due to the constant lack of building land, the development was narrowed, at least roughly, in the period between 1350 and 1552. The shape of the Little Paradise allows a dating between 1470 and 1550 due to the exposed, transition-time half-timbering in the gable.

The Square remained largely unchanged for centuries. It was only when tourism emerged at the end of the 19th century that it was rediscovered and quickly made a popular travel destination and a frequent photo and postcard motif. Within a few years, it had become, in addition to other classic old Frankfurt views such as the Kannengießergasse or the Roseneck, the highest representative status for the beauty and type of the old town of Frankfurt.

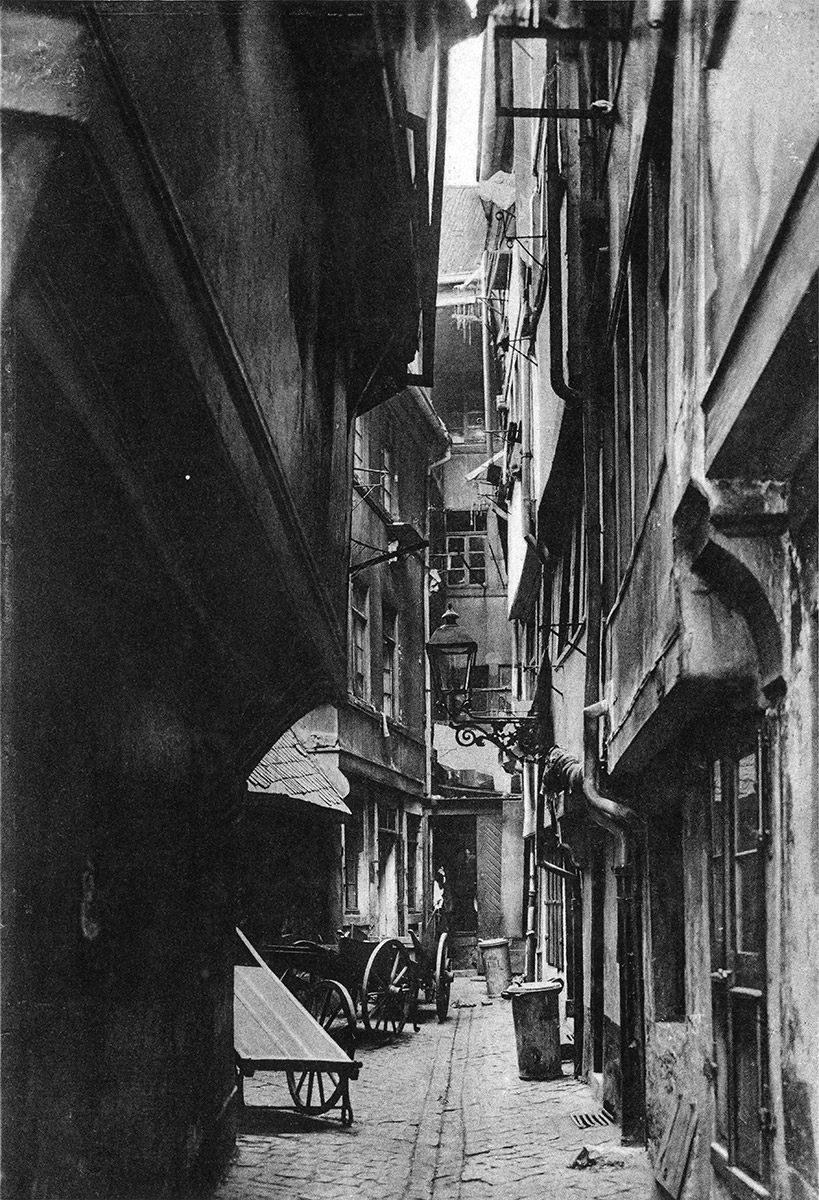
View into the Flößergasse, around 1900.

On the other hand, in the second half of the 19th century (between 1862 and 1877) the rather small houses with the address Goldhutgasse 1 and 3 were torn down for unexplained reasons. The reason, as was so often the case at this time, was most likely dilapidation. In fact, the entire structure of the old town was in a catastrophic condition at the turn of the century. The unplastered and therefore unsightly firewall of the adjoining house at Drachengasse 5 now shaped the place until the 1930s. It therefore did not appear on most postcards from that time or is only slightly cut out of the photos.

At the end of the 1930s, a large-scale renovation of the old town was carried out in Frankfurt am Main. In contrast to the historicist renovations at the turn of the century, which often destroyed more substance than redeveloped ones, and the only superficial measures taken by the federal government of old town friends in the 1920s, they largely took place under modern monument conservation aspects.

In 1936, the houses at the five-finger site were also completely renovated, numerous half-timbered buildings were exposed, the firewall of the house at Drachengasse 5 was converted into a real facade with windows, and a completely new space was created to the east of Goldhutgasse by means of a coring measure with the Handwerkerhöfchen (see plan).

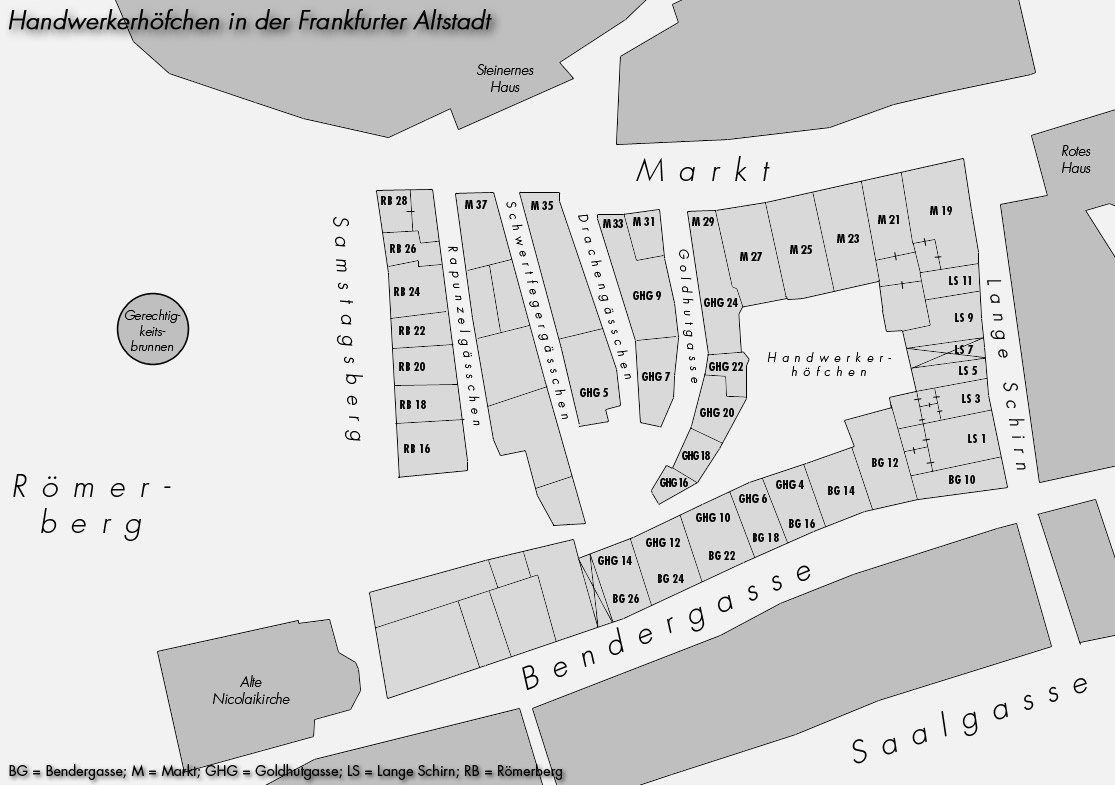
Handwerkerhöfchen square after it was gutted in 1938.

During the air raid on March 22, 1944, a devastating firestorm developed in this part of the old town because, without exception, there were half-timbered houses. Many of them were completely made of wood to the ground level and burned down completely. Only stone walls of the ground floors of individual houses remained. Although at least some of the destroyed old town houses could have been rebuilt, the city imposed a construction stop in 1946 and had the rubble cleared until 1950. The Butchers' Well had survived the war, badly damaged, and protruded from the ruins of the old town for a while until it was removed and initially disappeared into an urban depot. In 1968 it was restored by the Frankfurt sculptor Georg Krämer and was given a new location in the Große Rittergasse in Sachsenhausen next to the Kuhhirtenturm. As part of the Dom-Römer project, the city council received an application to set up the butcher fountain on the square in front of the reconstructed house of the Golden Scales.

After the rubble was cleared, the Five-Finger Square remained part of a parking lot until the early 1970s when the Dom / Römer underground station was created.

Any reconstruction of the square has become impossible in the long term since the Kunsthalle Schirn now covers large parts of the original site.

== Description and topography ==
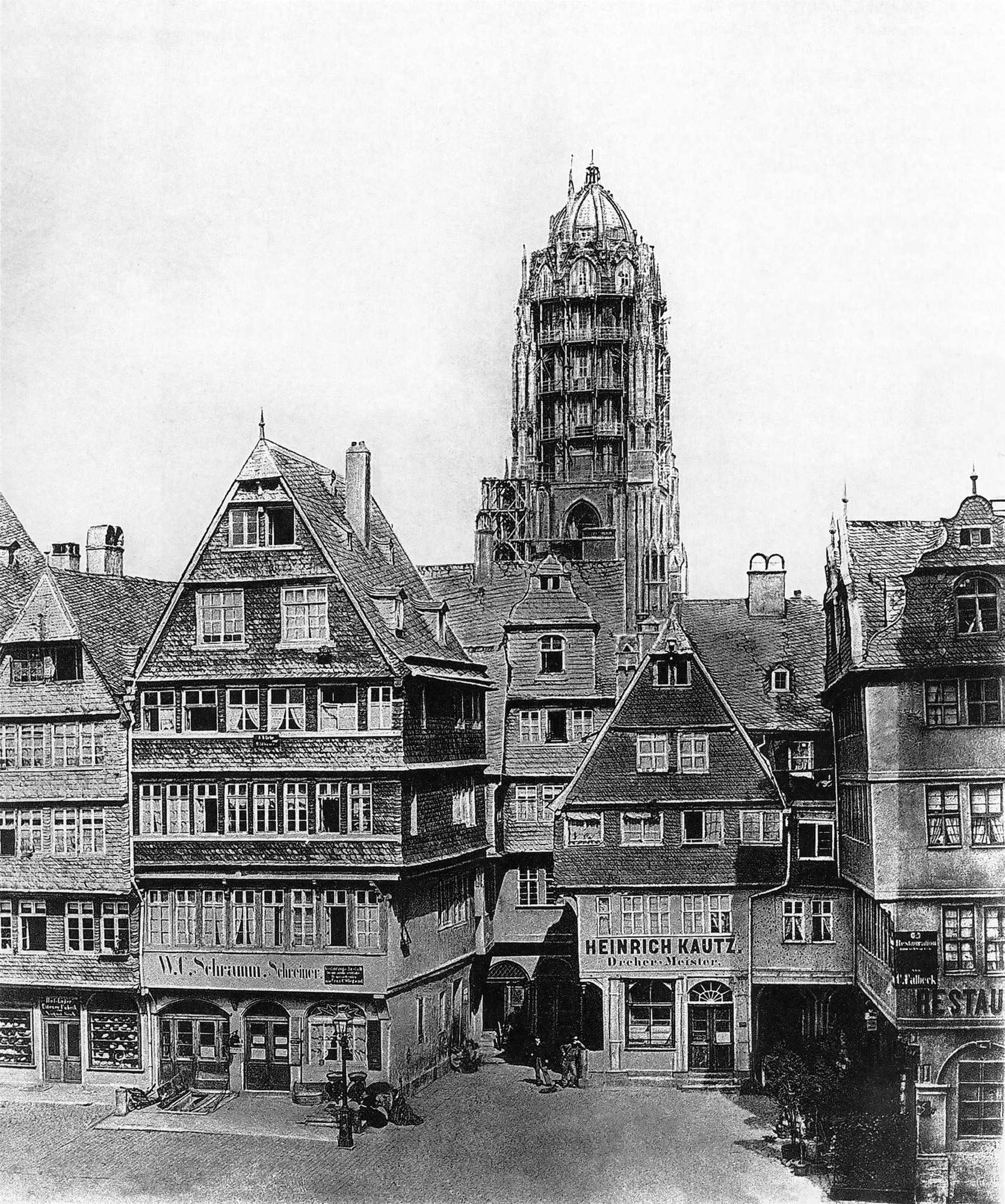
Haus zum Fleischer, photo by CF Mylius, 1869

The Five-Finger Square was less a place than a crossroads of several alleys, since it was not limited by a closed front of houses except to the south. The impression of a small square was nevertheless created by the winding arrangement of the houses and the curved course of the alleys. Whoever stood at the intersection of the alleys could not see out, although two of the most important junctions in the old town, the market with the chicken market and the Römerberg, were only a few meters away.

The plots on the square were unusually small and, unlike on the surrounding main streets in the old town, had not been contracted over the centuries for larger construction projects. In order to achieve a maximum floor area despite the small footprint, each upper floor protruded considerably from the one below. For stability, the upper floors rested on strong lugs, as could be observed everywhere along Goldhutgasse (see picture).

The impression of space was reinforced by the butcher's or craftsman's well. The pump fountain, built around 1800, consisted of a simple, ornamentless stele made of main sandstone, on which stood a boy leaning against an ornate stone water jug; the name of the fountain was reminiscent of the nearby Haus zum Fleischer (house address at that time: Römerberg 14 ), which was demolished in 1873 due to dilapidation (see picture).

=== The street names and their etymology ===
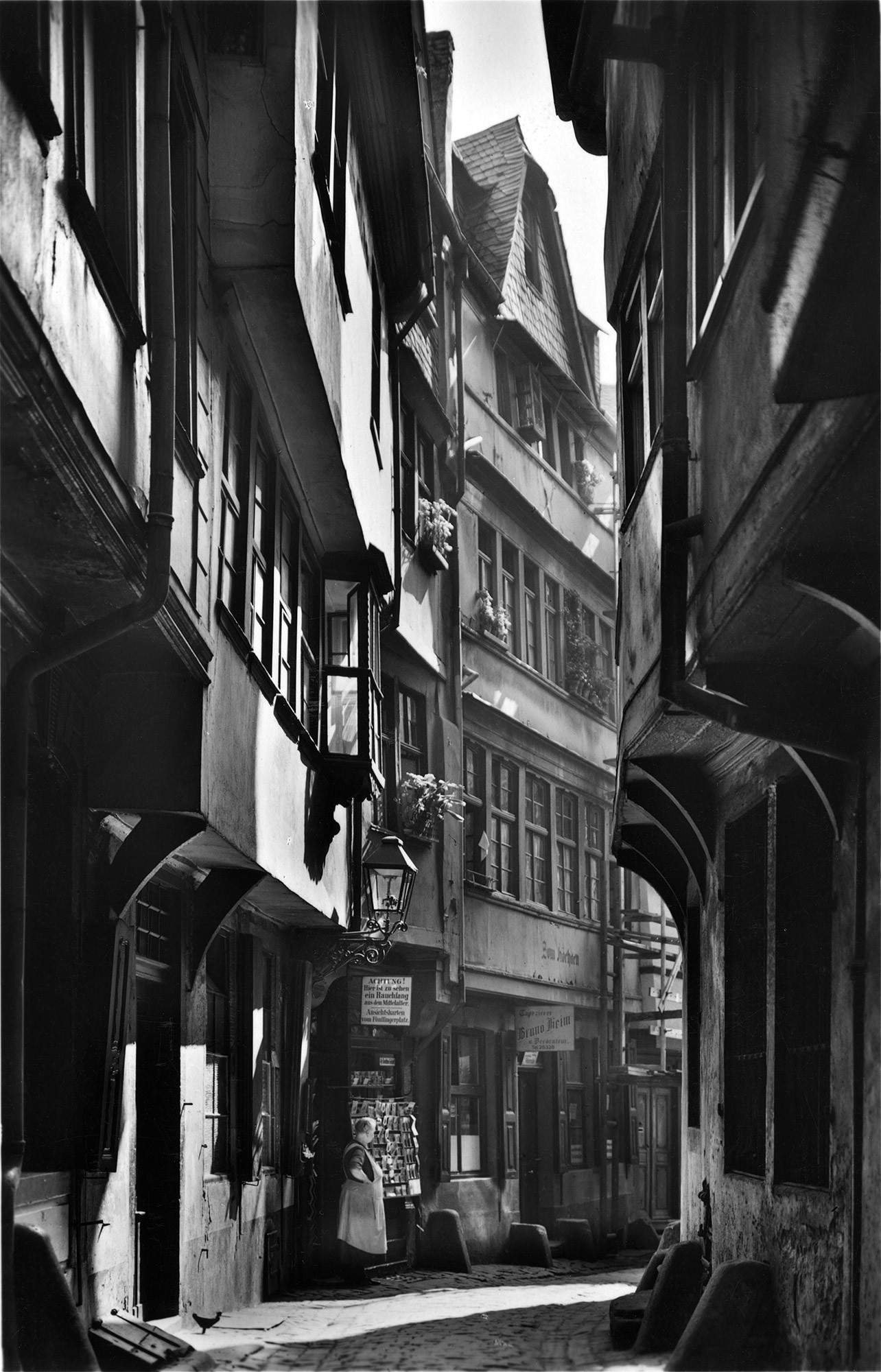
Goldhutgasse heading south, around 1900

The alley names on the Five-Finger Square have always been related to handicraft in the earliest records. Therefore, it can be assumed that, according to the medieval understanding of the guild, there were mainly craftsmen based on alleys:

The Goldhutgasse (see picture.), was previously known as Schuhgasse due to the presence of many wooden shoemakers, but got its modern name from the millinery in the house for the Golden Hut on the corner of Market / Goldhutgasse (Street address: Markt 31 ).

Löhergasse, which once ran east of Goldhutgasse, also got its name from the craft when Lohe, in old and middle high German still called Lö with umlaut, was used to denote tree bark used for tanning.

In Schwertfeger street, swords were the craft wrought by the former residents. The name of the dragon narrow calle - earlier referred to as flax weber alley after the craftmen who worked there - though not clarified completely, was possibly encouraged by the imagination of urban peoples about medieval legends that were associated with the dark, which was ever present, in the very narrow streets due to the lack of artificial light.

The name Rapunzelgässchen goes back to the 18th century and testified to the herbal market that was taking place at the time at the northern exit of Gässchen to the market. Previously, it was also called rope alley after a medieval craft. The name of the rafters alley explained as the same fountain from 1873 demolished house to the butcher - mundartlich was also called Flösser.

There was no direct road connection to Bendergasse, but there was a footpath through the basement of Goldhutgasse 14 / Bendergasse 26, popularly known as Stinkgasse - a descriptive name for the hygienic conditions prevailing here.

=== The Houses on the Five Finger Square ===
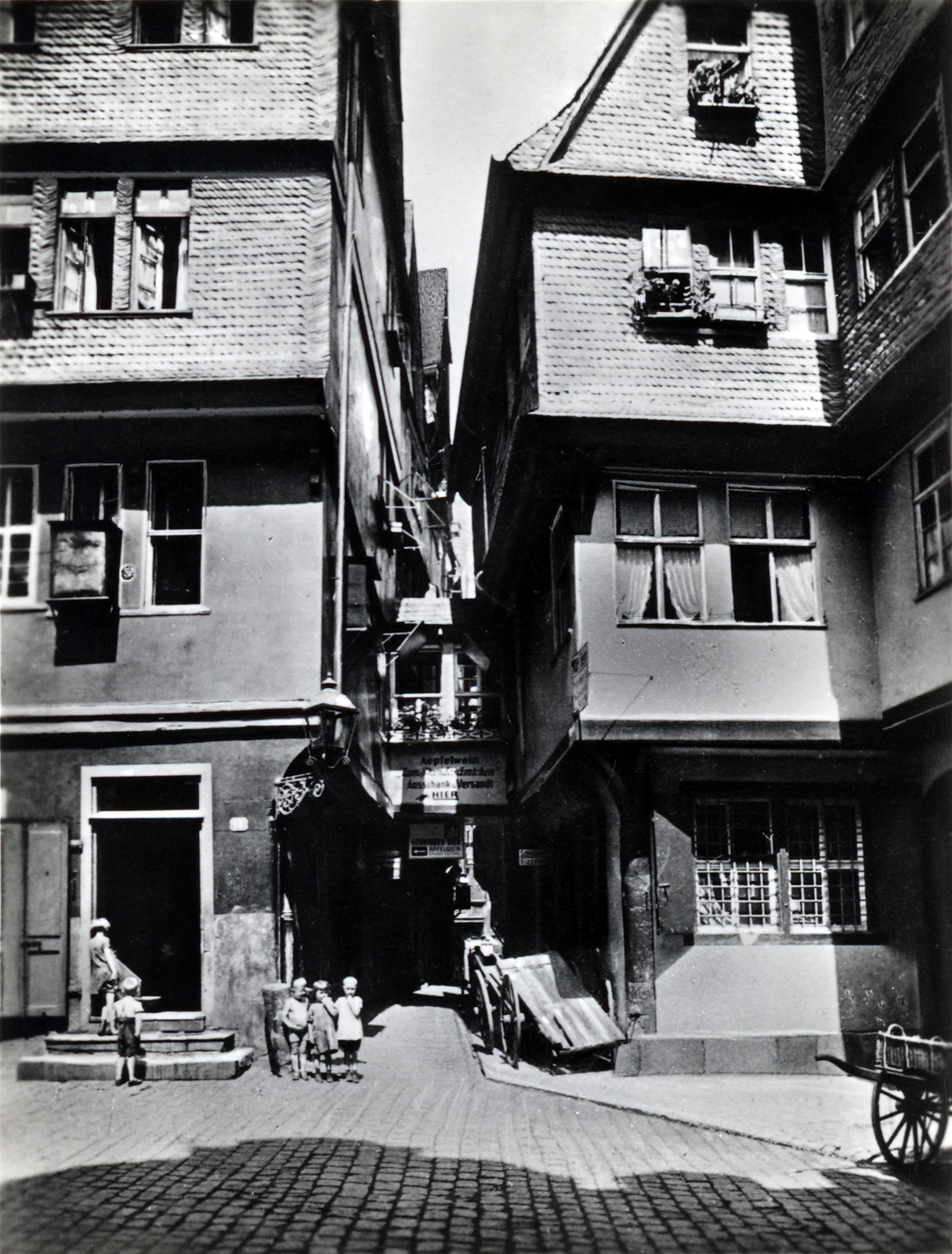
View into the Rapunzelgässchen, around 1900

All the houses around the square belonged to one of the alleys that brought them together. In the south it was the back houses of Bendergasse 26 and 24 with the address Goldhutgasse 14 and 12, called Pesthaus and Haus zum Hasen. In the east between Flößergasse and Goldhutgasse was the very narrow Haus zum Widder (house address: Goldhutgasse 16 ). The head building between Goldhutgasse and Drachengasse in the northeast, after the demolition of houses Goldhutgasse 1 and 3, was the Haus zur wild Frau (house address: Goldhutgasse 7 ). House Drachengasse 5 closed in the northwest and Little Römer in the west (house address: Römerberg 12) and the small food stall (house address: Römerberg 14 ), which in turn were the annexes of the Großer Laubenberg house (house address: Römerberg 16 ).

The houses, which had a side facing the sword sweep or dragon alley, had no corresponding address, rather they were either closed to Goldhutgasse or to the market.

Other houses nearby included the port, the Hadder cat, the track mouth or the golden lower coronary. Many of them were designed as restaurants and pubs equally for the numerous tourists and the active Frankfurt nightlife.

==== Pesthaus ====
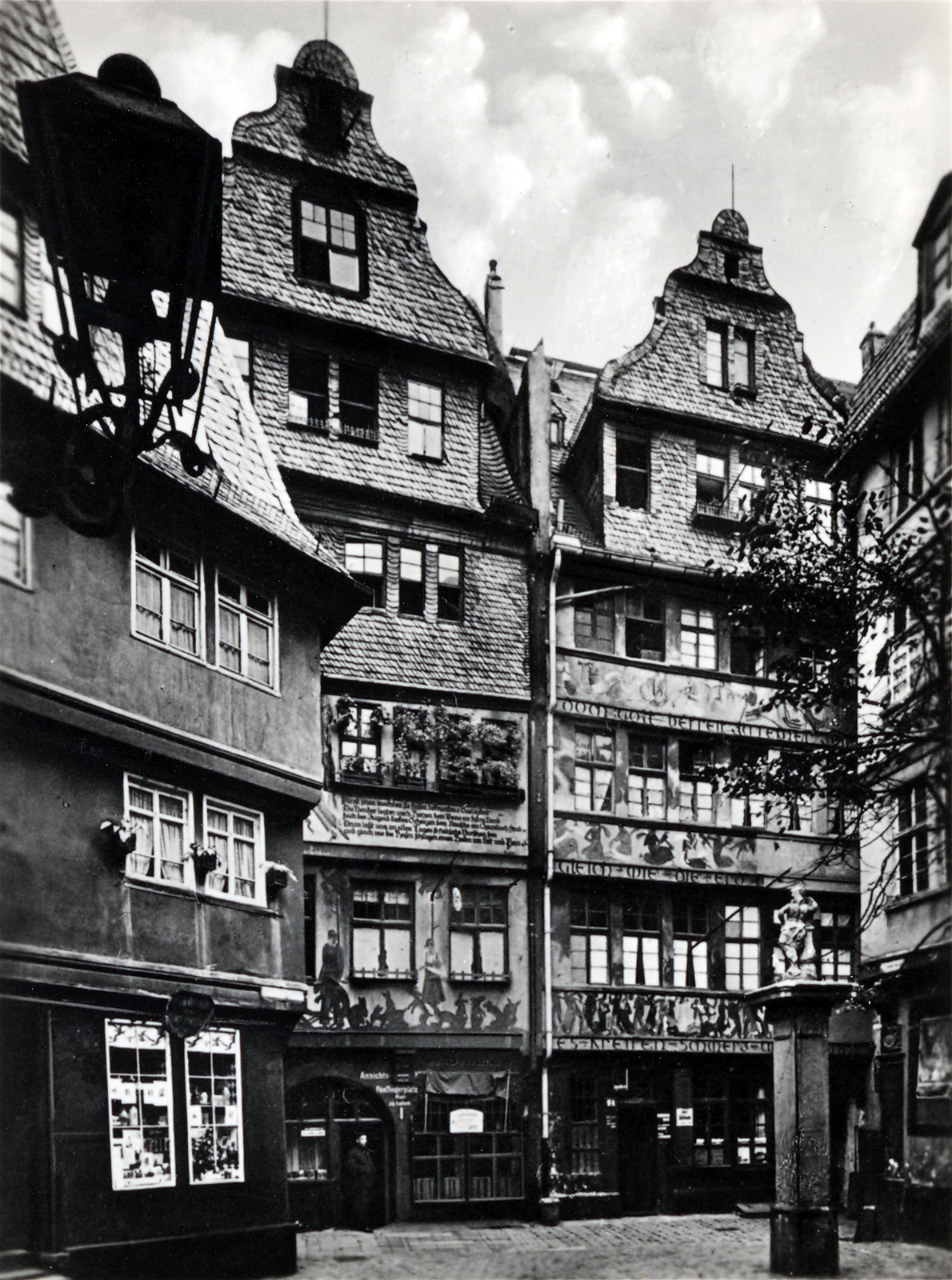
The houses Pesthaus and Haus zum Hasen, around 1900.

The most famous sight of the place was the so-called Pesthaus, in principle only a back house of the house with the address Bendergasse 26 (address for the five-finger cookie: Goldhutgasse 14). According to tradition, the plague first occurred here in 1349 in Frankfurt.

It is questionable, however, that the three-storey, plastered half-timbered house on view was actually still a Gothic building: the lack of overhangs, the more urban dimensions, and the ridge swivel expressed with a huge dwarf house rather refer to the 18th century than to the Middle Ages.

When the Frankfurt wholesale merchant Johannes Georg Kipp had his parents' house restored in 1924, he called the Offenbach painter Heinrich Holz, who nonetheless oriented the traditional role of the building in the design of the facade and richly themed them with inscriptions decorated, which said:

Pain and bliss circulate
same as the earth and sun
but God liberates in his time

The painting below the windows on the 1st floor depicted the suffering caused by the plague - writhing figures fighting with snakes, while the painting below the 2nd and 3rd floors showed people dancing as a token of gratitude for the end of death. Between July 22, 1349 and February 2, 1350, the Black Death claimed over 2,000 lives in the city, about a fifth of the population at that time.

At the end of the 1930s, as part of the renovation of the old town, a half-timbering was uncovered, which the painting fell victim to, despite only being applied about 10 years earlier. With simple St. Andrew's crosses and rhombuses, the result showed a building that was originally designed from a visual point of view, but in no way elaborate with jewellery forms or even carvings and thus only confirms the thesis that the original plague house was replaced by a new building after the end of the Middle Ages.

==== Haus zum Hasen ====
The neighbouring Haus zum Hasen (English: House of the Rabbits) was almost completely identical to the neighboring Pesthaus, at least in terms of appearance, and thus probably also to be treated in the same way with regard to its time of origin. A closer look at the building history is no longer possible, since the half-timbering of the building has been plastered at least since the early 19th century and has never been documented in drawings or photographs. In 1924 it was painted like the plague house by Heinrich Holz and provided with an inscription by Rudolf Kilb:

Five streets lead from this house in pleasure and suffering
How many times have they caught drunken bliss
The Bender put a strong bond around the heart of the wine
but the youthful cheeky joke found a hole in the noise
So let's be such happy guys every day
and just like the rabbits make a mark on need and pain

==== Haus zum Widder ====
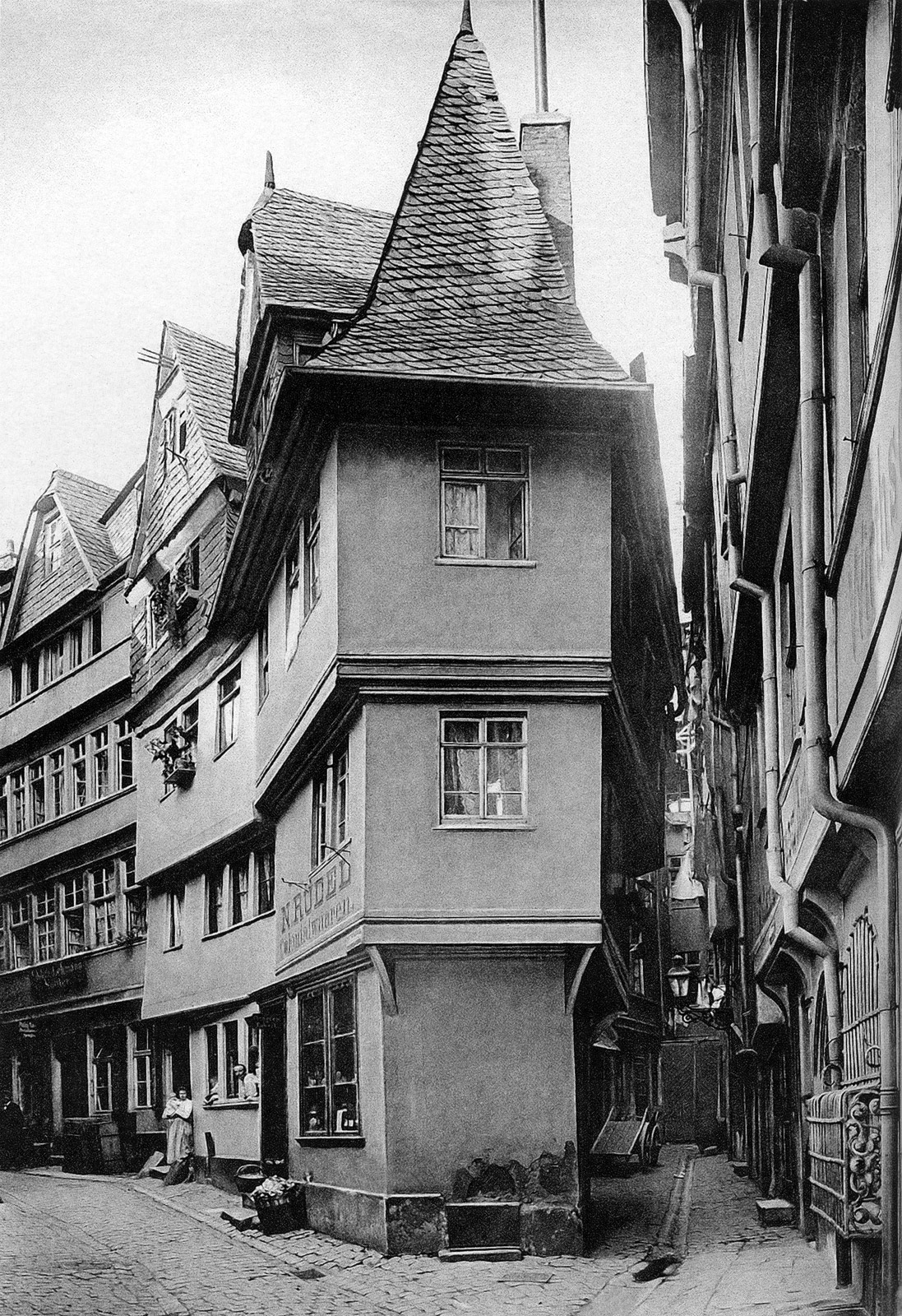
House of the Ram, photo by CF Mylius, around 1880

The house, which stood as a head building between Goldhut and Flössergasse and with only the northern firewall, was called Zum Widder (English: House of the Ram). Because of its extremely small parcel, which was two meters short on the narrowest side facing the Square, but on the other side extended over a total of three cantilevered floors and ended with a very pointed roof. It was not only an attractive sight but was often seen as the epitome of the Gothic house.

However, the half-timbering uncovered a progressive, in no detail really medieval construction on the building. This was made clear by two fully trained male figures in the half-timbering, which was only be present in half-timbered buildings from the second half of the 16th century. Because of the conservative citizenry and the associated very long finale of the late Gothic in Frankfurt, the construction can be dated but almost certainly at least in the first half of the 17th century.

On the other hand, the ground floor showed some peculiarities: it was not massive, but largely made of wood, apart from an approximately knee-high stone base. The dowel ceiling, which is visible from the outside between the ground floor and the first floor, is a further indication that a new building from the 17th century only extended to the upper floors but retained a ground floor from at least the first half of the 15th century.

All in all, the house was an interesting hybrid of medieval and modern carpentry. His loss due to the war is also extremely unfortunate from an engineering point of view, as modern investigation methods could certainly have provided valuable information about the specific development of the half-timbered building in Alt-Frankfurt.

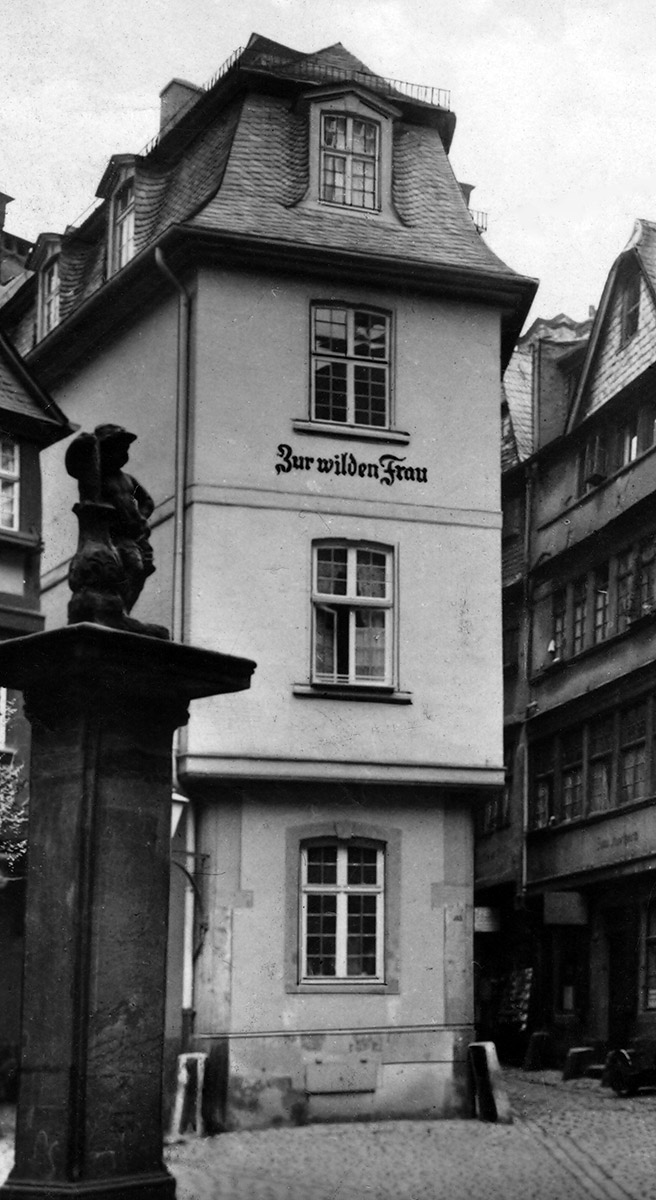
Wild Woman's House, photo by CA Abt, around 1910

==== Haus zur wilden Frau ====
The corner house between Drachengässchen and Goldhutgasse was called Zur wilden Frau (English: House of the Wild Woman) and had a thematic painting that was reminiscent of a dragon. There was hardly a larger side to the square than the neighbouring Haus zum Widder, but in depth it took up almost half of the block that extended to the market.

Apart from the narrow side, the house with its mansard roof and baroque windows looked like a product from the late 17th or 18th century, but here too the 1930s exposure brought unexpected details to light. They uncovered massive Gothic corner stands on the ground floor, so that here too it can be assumed that the building altered into a baroque with a core building from the late Middle Ages.

However, as photos from the early 1940s showed, the decision was made not to expose the original half-timbering, probably because, as so often, it was completely spoiled by the subsequent changes.

== Literature ==
- Paul Wolff, Fried Lübbecke: Old Frankfurt, New Series. Englert & Schlosser publishing house, Frankfurt am Main 1924, S. 39–42
- Heinrich Voelcker, Die Altstadt in Frankfurt am Main innerhalb der Hohenstaufenmauer. Frankfurt am Main 1937, Moritz Diesterweg publishing house
- Georg Hartmann, Fried Lübbecke: Alt-Frankfurt. Ein Vermächtnis. Verlag Sauer und Auvermann, Glashütten 1971
- Hartwig Beseler, Niels Gutschow: Kriegsschicksale Deutscher Architektur – Verluste, Schäden, Wiederaufbau. Karl Wachholtz Verlag, Neumünster 1988, ISBN 3-529-02685-9
