= Bendergasse =

Former major street in the old town of Frankfurt

Coordinates: 50°6′37.0″N 8°40′59.2″E

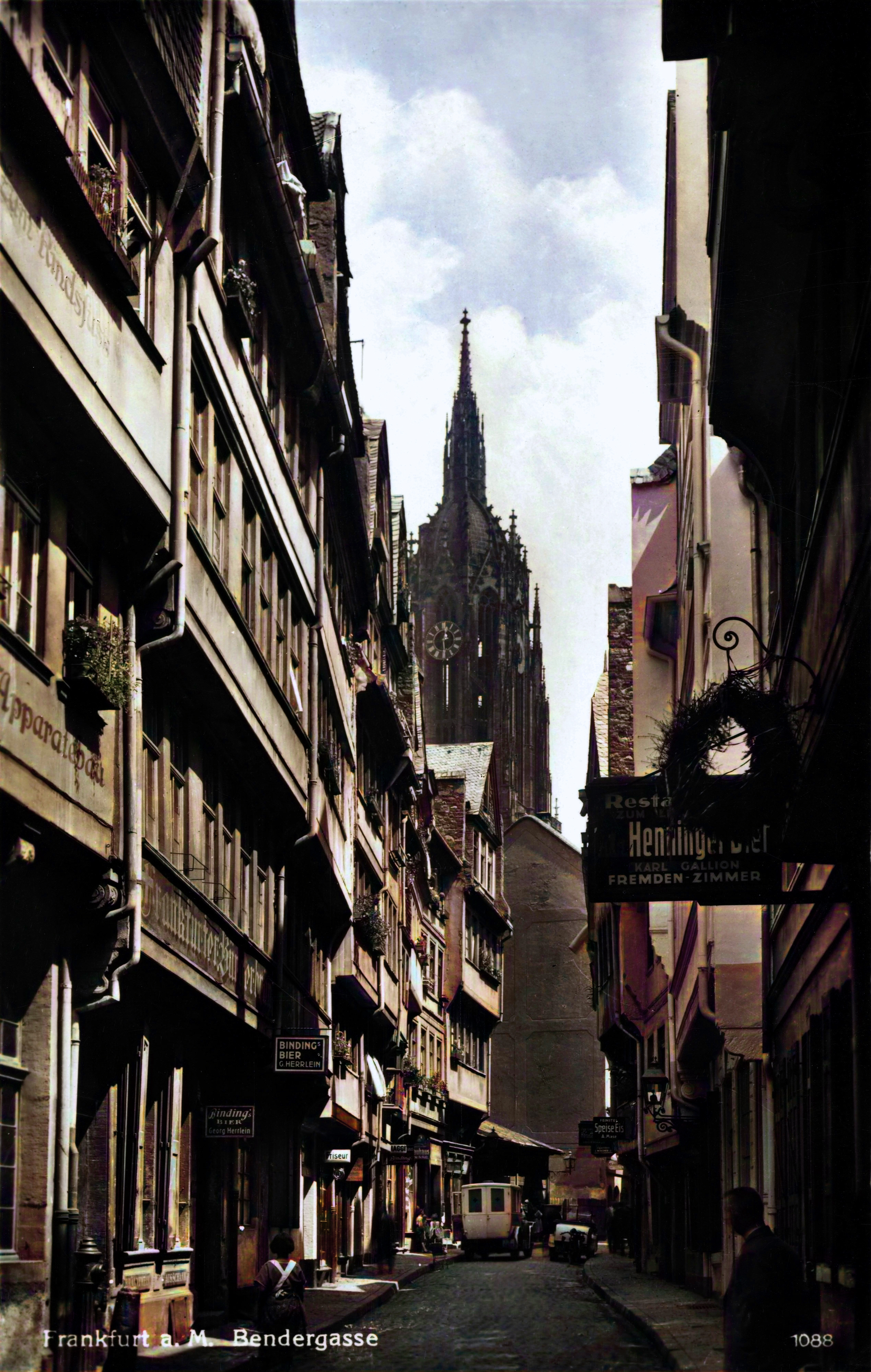
Postcard around 1910

The Bendergasse was a former major street in the old town of Frankfurt. It ran from near Frankfurt Cathedral to the Römerberg square. From the Middle Ages till the destruction in the air raid on 22 March 1944, it formed one of the main streets in the old town centre. It was a densely built street with gabled, multi-level and multi-cantilevered half-timbered houses in Gothic and Baroque architectural styles. It was one of the most picturesque streets in the old town and served as a motif for numerous artists from the 19th century till its destruction.

After a long period of wreckage after the war, Bendergasse was built over in 1986 with the Schirn Kunsthalle Frankfurt. The footpath along the north facade of the Schirn is listed as Bendergasse in today's city maps. A nearby area of the old town was rebuilt in 2016 in the Dom-Römer project which brought back nearby streets that are reminiscent of the Bendergasse.

== Location ==
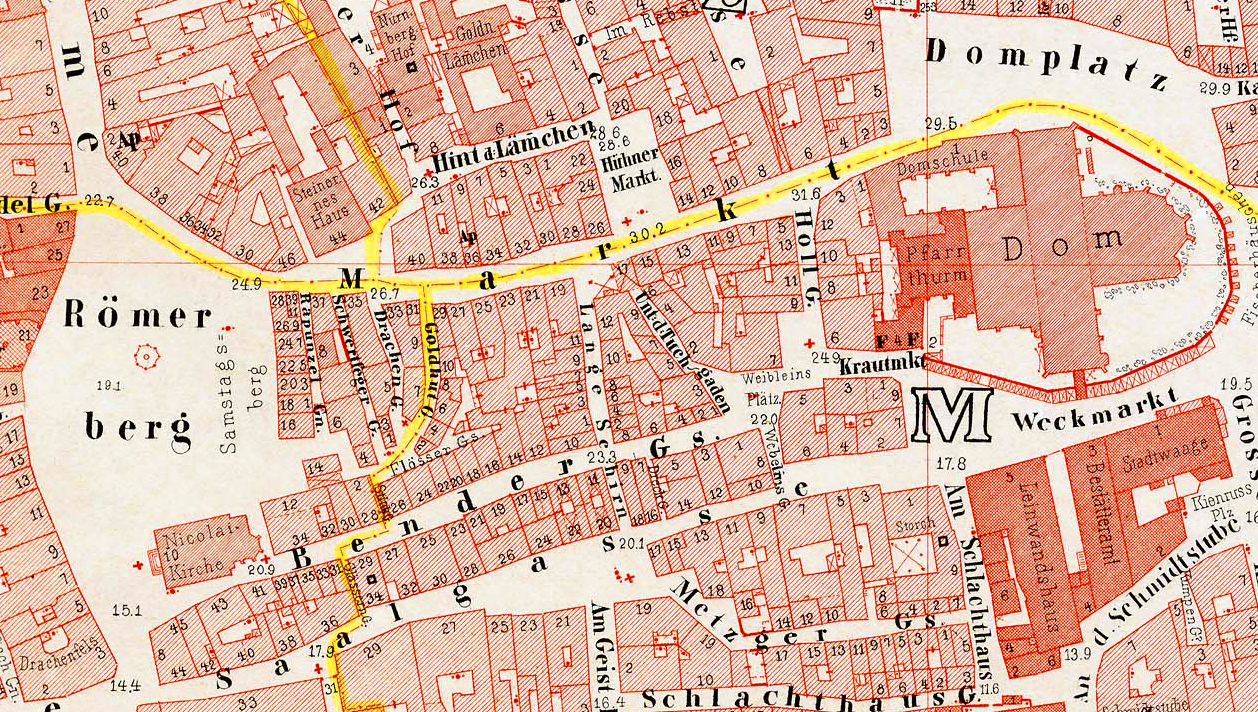
Dom-Römer area on the Ravensteinplan 1862

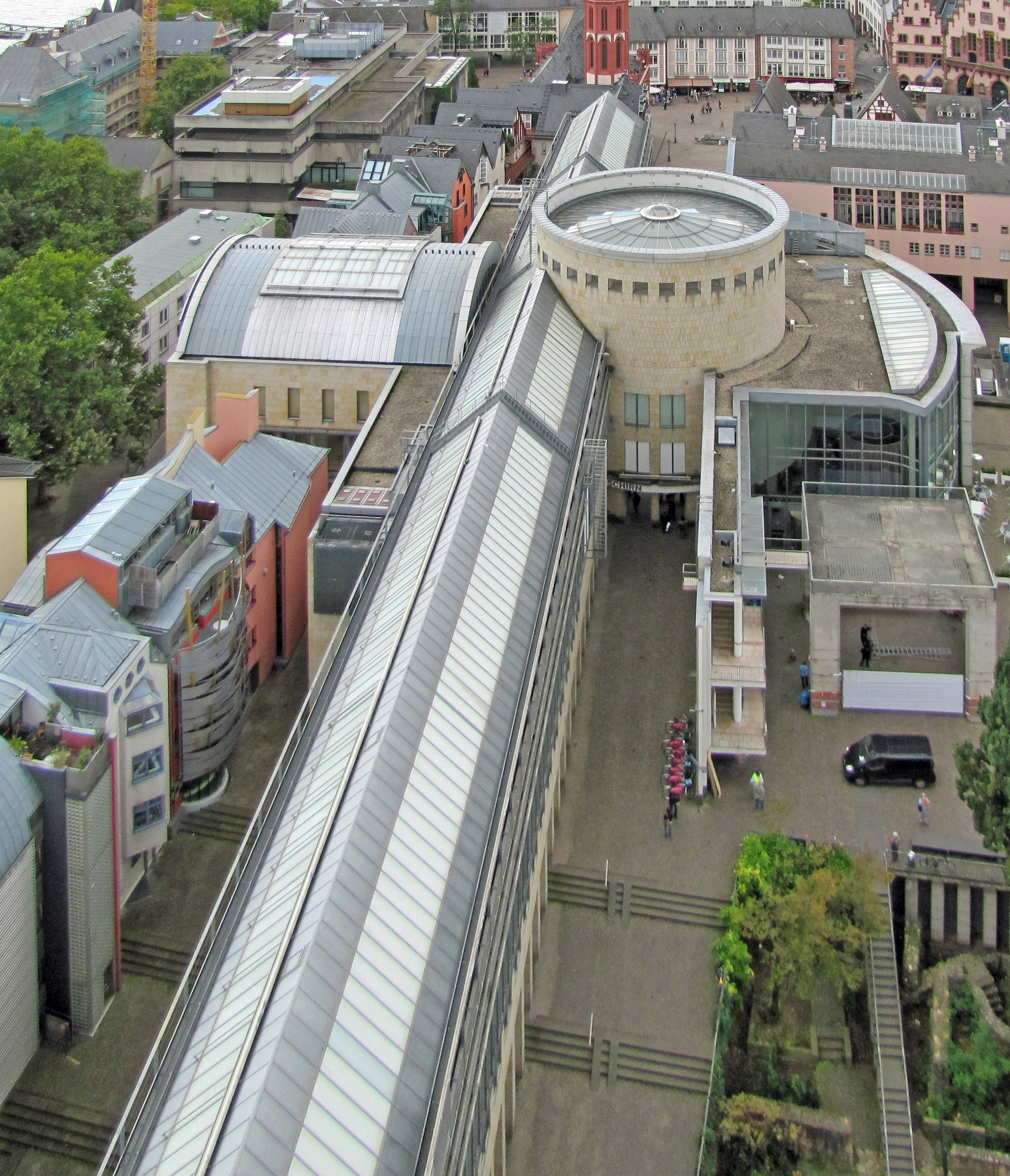
The current course of Bendergasse along the Schirn

Bendergasse and most of the old town of Frankfurt, had reached its basic form by the end of the 12th century. It connected the large squares between the cathedral and Römerberg.

Around the middle of Bendergasse was a small street called Lange Schirn, which connected the nain market street with Saalgasse street. Also near here were two important historic buildings known as the Scharnhäuser which had connections to the early life of the German writer Johann von Goethe.

There were several narrow passages and side streets to the Bendergasse: in the north the narrow Stinkgäßchen connected Bendergasse to the Five- Finger Square, one of the most picturesque squares in the old town. On the southern end, the streets Dreckgäßchen and Lange Schirn, and further west the small alley Gläsergäßchen between houses 29 and 31 which connected the Bendergasse with Saalgasse. The names of the passages such as Stinkgäßchen, meaning Stink lane, indicate the hygienic conditions in the densely populated old town.

Nothing can be seen of the former course of the road in today's cityscape. There is a footpath known as Bendergasse which is located somewhat north of the old street but nothing else remains.

== History ==
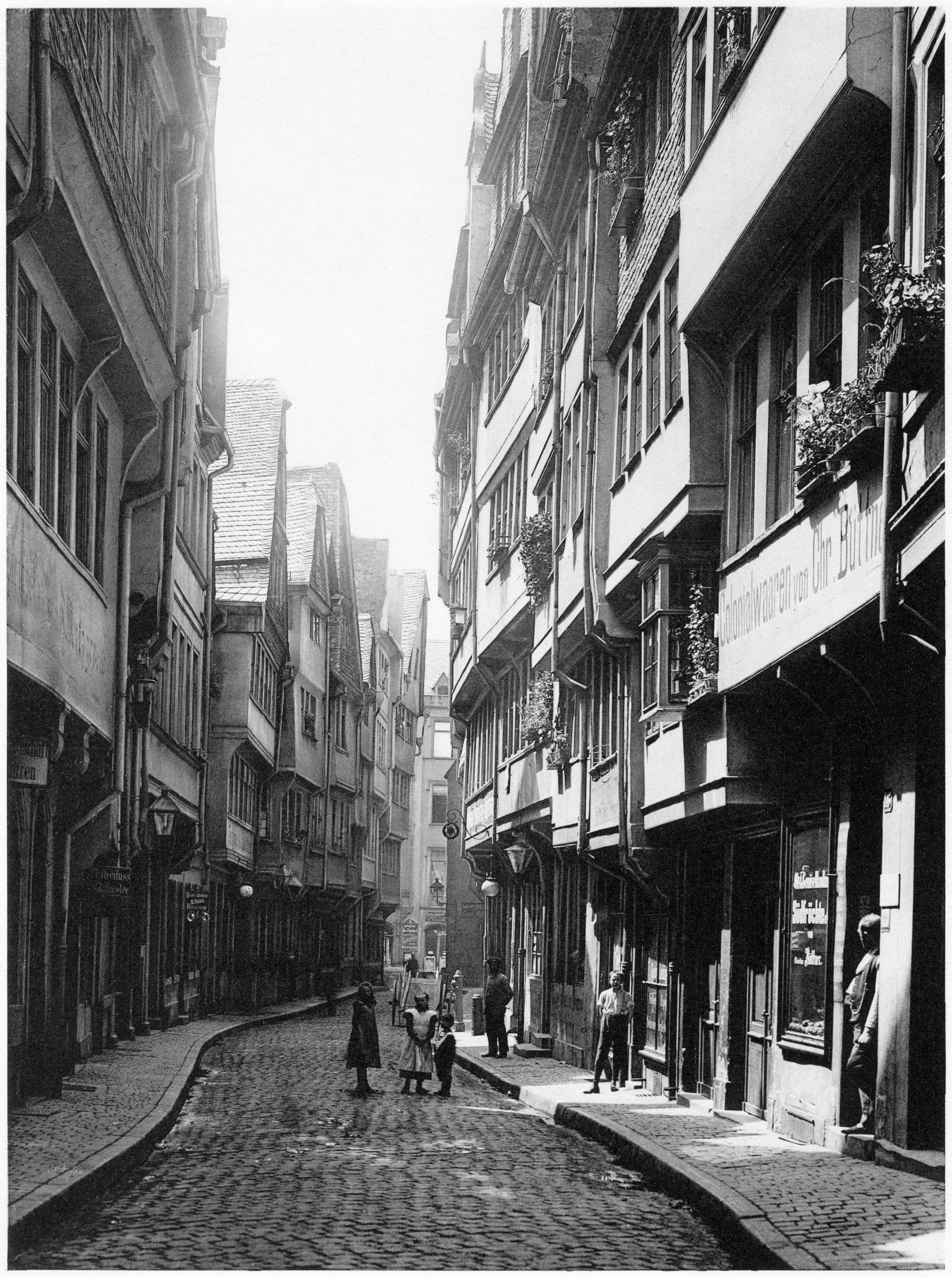
Bendergasse around 1904

The oldest mention of the Bendergasse can be found in a document from 1324. In Latin writings of this time it is referred to as vicus doliatorum.

Until the end of the Holy Roman Empire and the Free Imperial City in 1806, the old town was the lively centre of the city. The cityscape remained essentially unchanged for centuries, as can be seen in a bird's eye view plan from 1628 by Matthäus Merian. In August 1763, the Mozart family stayed at Haus Bendergasse 3 during their first stay in Frankfurt. Leopold Mozart scratched the inscription in the window of his accommodation with his ring:

In the 19th century, wealthy citizens left the old town and moved to the new districts outside the ramparts. Small craftsmen and working-class families primarily lived in the old town. By dividing the formerly spacious apartment buildings, living conditions became ever tighter. At the beginning of the 20th century it was not uncommon for a dozen families to live in the rather dilapidated half-timbered houses in the old town. The hygienic conditions improved with the construction of a sewer system in 1867. Traffic conditions remained cramped. At the beginning of the 20th century, there were trams and major road breakthroughs on Braubachstrasse and Bethmannstrasse streets but they did not reach this part of the old town. Dilapidated houses were often demolished and not replaced, for example around 1864 the house Bendergasse 8 on the corner of the Langen Schirn street was demolished for this reason.

From 1922 onwards, the Federation of Friends of the Old Town, on the initiative of the historian Fried Lübbecke, campaigned for the restoration of the old town and an improvement in its living conditions. Many old town houses were renovated with the half-timbering exposed (for example at the house Schwarzer Stern) and the living conditions improved by gutting and removing the narrow passageways and backyards. The emerging tourism made Frankfurt's old town a popular travel destination and the Gothic canyon of Bendergasse was a frequently photographed postcard motif.

=== Destruction ===
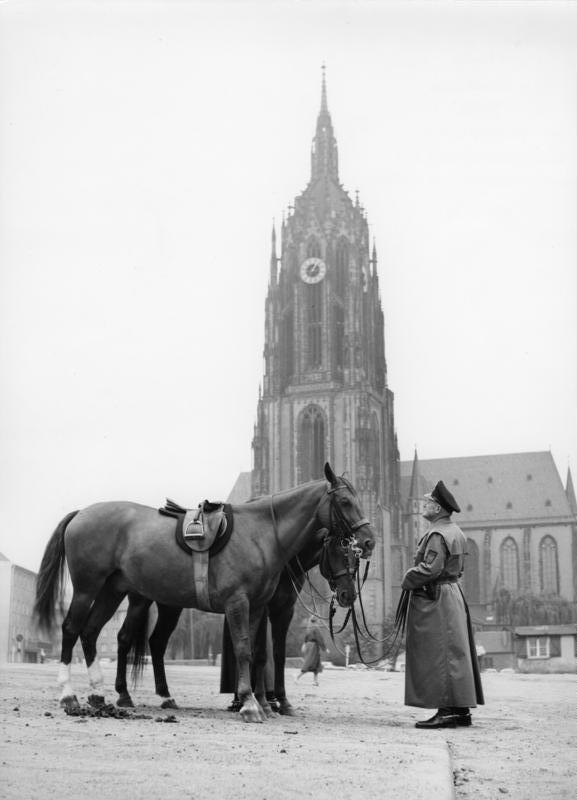
Mounted police in front of the cathedral in July 1960. Remains of the old curb can be seen in the foreground.

On 22 March 1944, an air raid destroyed the historic old town. In the district between the cathedral and the Römer, all the houses burned down, including Bendergasse. Only remains of the stone ground floors survived the firestorm. In May 1947, the Frankfurt magistrate decided that a comprehensive restoration of the old town was out of the question, apart from a few striking monuments. The rubble was completely cleared in the area between the cathedral and the Römer until 1950. While the general construction in the old town began in 1952 and was essentially completed in 1960, the area between the cathedral and the Römer remained a wasteland and the future shape of it was long debated. In 1970/71 the north of Bendergasse was built on with an underground station and a two-story underground garage above. The largely preserved medieval vaulted cellars were destroyed in the excavation of the construction pit. The construction of the underground car park also raised the floor level by several meters. The western end of Bendergasse was built over in 1971/72 with the construction of a history museum.

In 1983, a building complex consisting of reconstructed houses on the east side of Römerberg was built here. The Schirn Kunsthalle Frankfurt was also built in this time. This monumental, 140 meter long, 10 meter wide and five storey high exhibition hall runs almost exactly over the north side of the old Bendergasse.

As part of the Dom-Römer project, the archaeological garden with the preserved remains of the Roman settlement and the Carolingian-Ottonian royal palatinate Frankfurt was built over. The event and museum building, which was completed in June 2016, form the new north side of Bendergasse.

== Gallery ==
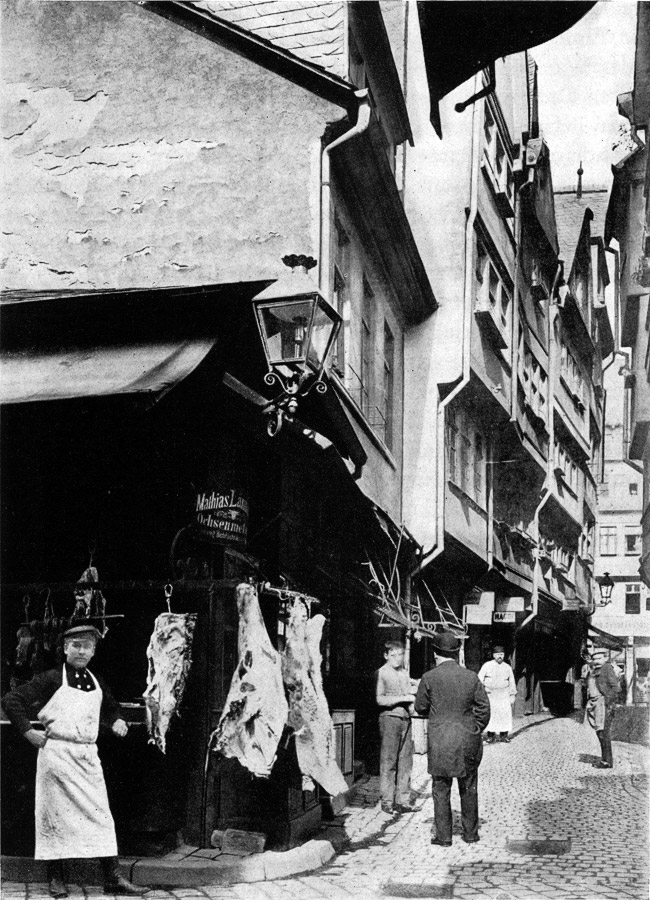
Frankfurt Am Main Lange Schirn alley towards the Rotes Haus (Red House) looking northwards in 1911.

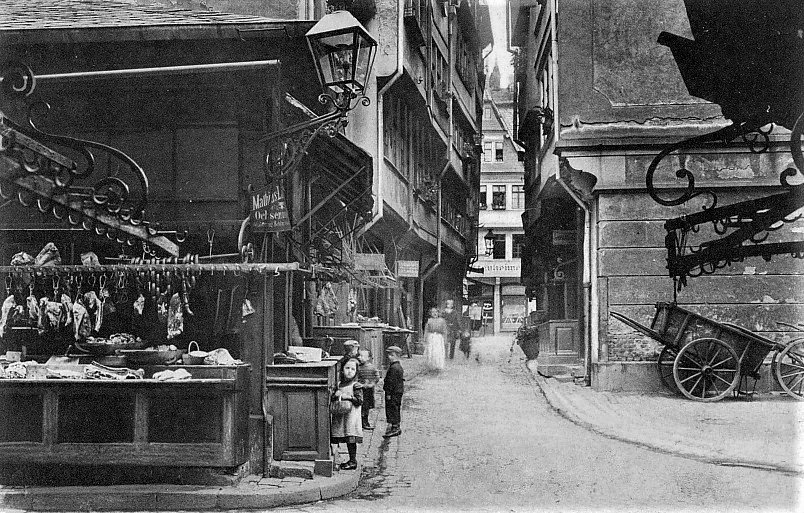
Lange Schirn Alley from Bendergasse, Frankfurt Am Main, 1905

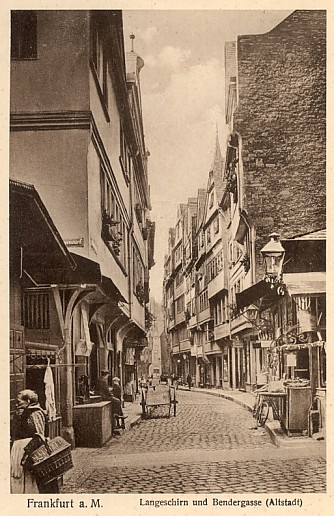
Bendergasse to the west, approx. 1910

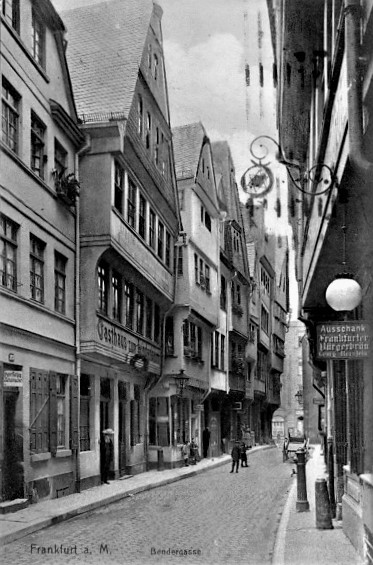
View of the Bendergasse, Frankfurt am Main in 1921

== Literature ==
- Johann Georg Battonn (1864), Local description of the city of Frankfurt am Main: Third booklet containing the description of the old town, namely the southern and western parts of the upper town (in German), Frankfurt am Main: Verlag des Gesellschaft for Frankfurt Geschichte | Association for history and antiquity, pp. 294–324
- Georg Hartmann, Fried Lübbecke: Old Frankfurt. A legacy. Verlag Sauer and Auvermann, Glashütten 1971
- Fried Lübbecke: The face of the city – based on Frankfurt plans by Faber, Merian u. Delkeskamp; 1552 – 1864, publishing house Waldemar Kramer, Frankfurt am Main 1952/1983, ISBN 3-7829-0276-9
