= Ricardo Rodriguez =

Ricardo Rodriguez or Rodríguez may refer to:

== Sports ==
=== Association football ===
- Ricardo Rodríguez Suárez (born 1974), Spanish football coach
- Ricardo Rodriguez (footballer) (Ricardo Iván Rodríguez Araya, born 1992), Swiss football left-back
- Ricardo Rodríguez (footballer, born 1998) (Ricardo José Rodríguez Marengo), Argentine football striker
- Ricardo Rodríguez (footballer, born 2001) (Ricardo Rodríguez Mazzocco), Mexican football goalkeeper

=== Baseball ===
- Rick Rodriguez (born 1960), Major League Baseball pitcher
- Rich Rodriguez (baseball) (Richard Anthony Rodriguez, born 1963), Major League Baseball pitcher
- Ricardo Rodríguez (baseball, born 1978) (Ricardo Antonio Rodríguez), Major League Baseball pitcher from the Dominican Republic
- Ricardo Rodríguez (baseball, born 1992) (Ricardo José Rodríguez), Major League Baseball pitcher from Venezuela

=== Other sports ===
- Ricardo Rodríguez (racing driver) (1942–1962), Formula One driver
- Ricardo José Rodríguez (born 1952), Argentine rower
- Ricardo Rodríguez (bobsleigh) (born 1967), Mexican bobsledder
- Ricardo Rodriguez (wrestler) (born 1986), ring name for Jesus Rodriguez, professional wrestler and ring announcer
- Ricardo Rodríguez-Pace (born 1993), Venezuelan tennis player

== Others ==
- Ricardo Rodríguez Rocha, (born 1962), Mexican politician
- Ricardo Rodríguez Saá, Governor of San Luis Province in Argentina, 1934–1938
- Ricky Rodriguez (1975–2005), aka Davidito, member of Children of God
