= Ricardo Santos =

Ricardo Santos may refer to:

- Ricardo Santos (beach volleyball) (born 1975), Brazilian beach volleyball player
- Ricardo Santos (footballer, born 1987), Brazilian footballer
- Ricardo Santos (golfer) (born 1982), Portuguese golfer
- Ricardo Santos (sailor) (born 1980), Brazilian windsurfer
- Ricardo Santos (footballer, born 1995), Portuguese footballer
