= Riccardo Staglianò =

Italian journalist

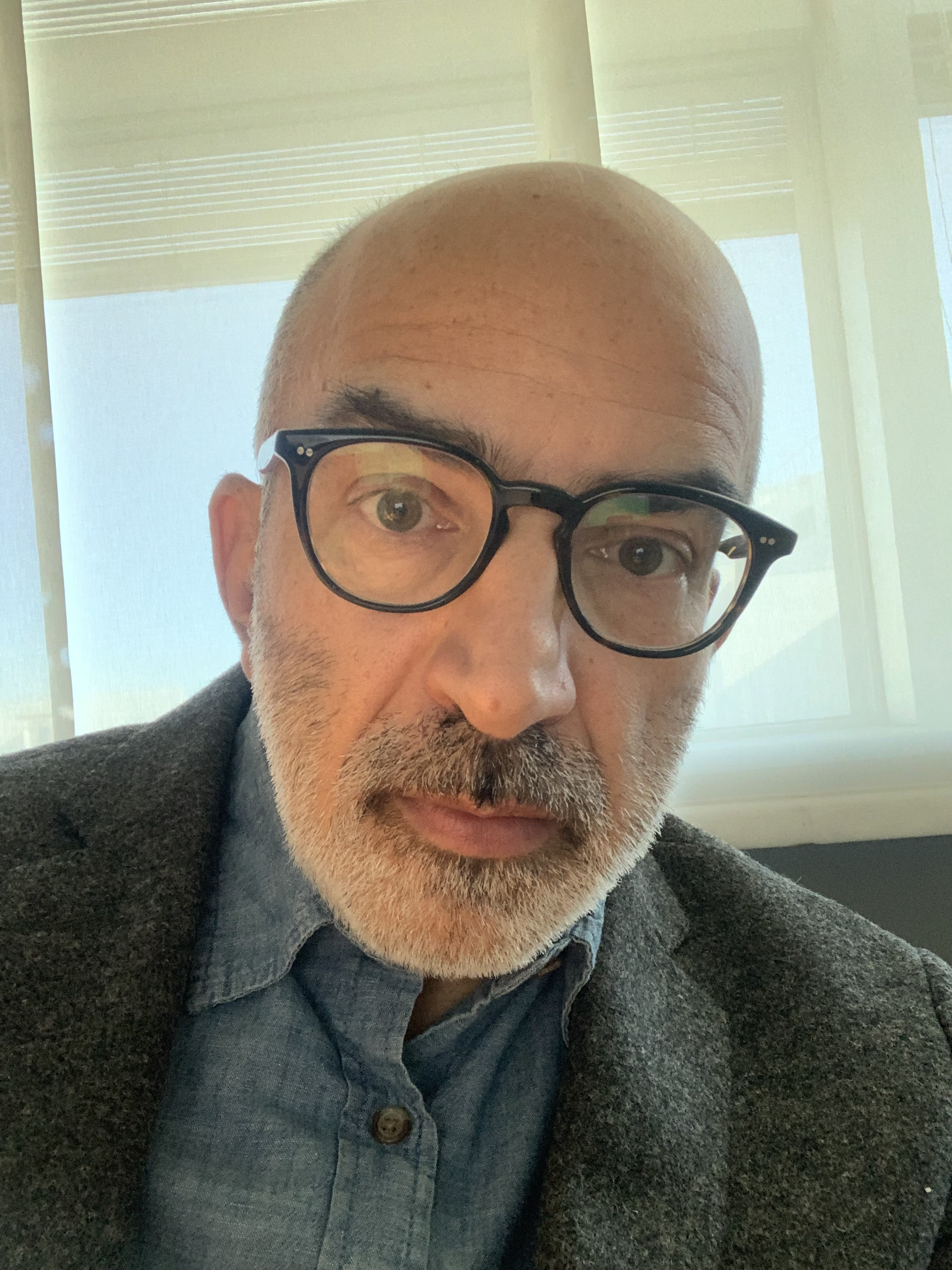
Riccardo Staglianò al Venerdì di Repubblica (2022)

Riccardo Staglianò (born 1968 in Viareggio) is an author and reporter for the Italian newspaper La Repubblica.

Staglianò has been writing for another Italian newspaper, Corriere della Sera, about new technologies. He is a co-founder of the on-line cultural magazine Caffè Europa. In New York, he has been a correspondent for the monthly magazine Reset.

Since 2002 he has been teaching theory and technology of the new media and online journalism (Giornalismo On line) in the Third University of Rome.

In 2000, for the Italian publishing house Feltrinelli, he wrote Bill Gates: An Unauthorized Biography (Bill Gates, una biografia non autorizzata).
