= Ricardinho (footballer, born 2005) =

Portuguese footballer (born 2005)

Personal information
- Full name: Ricardo Alexandre Gomes Simões
- Date of birth: 27 December 2005 (age 20)
- Place of birth: Mafra, Portugal
- Height: 1.65 m (5 ft 5 in)
- Positions: Midfielder; winger

Team information
- Current team: CD Mafra
- Number: 75

Youth career
- Mafra

Senior career*
Years	Team	Apps	(Gls)
2021–2023	Mafra	1	(0)
2023-	Gil Vicente		
- * Club domestic league appearances and goals as of 14 February 2022

Ricardo Alexandre Gomes Simões, known mononymously as Ricardinho (born 27 December 2005) is a Portuguese professional footballer who plays for Gil Vicente.

== Club career ==
Called to the first team by Ricardo Sousa in the early 2021–22 season, Ricardinho enjoyed a few bench appearances while aged 15, before making his professional debut on the 2 February 2022, as he replaced Gui Ferreira in the last minutes of a 2–0 Liga Portugal 2 away loss to Leixões. On that occasion, he became the youngest ever footballer to play in Portugal's second tier, surpassing André Almeida's record.
