= Riccardo Truccolo =

Italian basketball player (born 1989)

Riccardo Truccolo (born 8 August 1989 in Pordenone, Italy) is an Italian professional basketball player, currently a member of Snaidero Udine of the Italian league (LegADue/Serie A2).

Truccolo began his career in the youth sector of Pallacanestro Pordenone, then moved to Nuovo Basket 2000 Pordenone (now part of SBP - Sistema Basket Pordenone). In summer 2005 he was selected by Serie A team Snaidero Udine to be part of the team's youth sector. During his first season in Udine, he was also called upon by coach Cesare Pancotto to take part in several Serie A1 matches as a reserve, though never actually stepping onto the court.

In August 2006 he joined Nuova Pallacanestro Pavia (known as Edimes Pavia for sponsorship reasons) of the Italian LegADue (Serie A2) league. Even though Pavia enjoyed one of its most successful seasons of recent times, reaching the play-off finals against Scavolini Pesaro, Truccolo's stay in Lombardy can be generally considered unsatisfactory, since he was rarely given a chance to prove his worth during regular season, only recording good performances during the team's pre-season and play-offs.

At the end of July 2007, shortly after the end of the Lega2 championship, he went back to Snaidero Udine after signing a four-year contract. Once again under the lead of Cesare Pancotto, Truccolo was seldom given the opportunity to play consistently. During summer 2008 he was taken on loan at Jesolo-Sandonà Basket (Serie A Dilettanti), playing a key role in helping the Venetian side avoid relegation.

He has rejoined Snaidero Udine for the 2009/2010 LegADue season. He currently plays for Basket Perugia.

== Italian national team ==
After his experience in Jesolo, he became part of Italy’s national Under-20 basketball team to play in the 2009 FIBA Europe U-20 Championship in Rhodes, Greece.
