= Ricardo Bierhals =

Brazilian footballer

Personal information
- Full name: Ricardo Oliveira Bierhals
- Date of birth: 4 July 1992 (age 34)
- Place of birth: Pelotas, Brazil
- Height: 1.92 m (6 ft 3 1/2 in)
- Position: Centre-back

Team information
- Current team: Pelotas

Youth career
- 2006–2010: Internacional
- 2011–2012: Brasil de Pelotas

Senior career*
Years	Team	Apps	(Gls)
2013–2016	Brasil de Pelotas	13	(0)
2017–	Pelotas	0	(0)
- * Club domestic league appearances and goals as of 16 September 2016 ‡ National team caps and goals as of 16 September 2016

Ricardo Oliveira Bierhals (born 6 November 1990), known as Ricardo Bierhals, is a Brazilian professional footballer who plays as a centre-back for Pelotas.

== Career ==
Ricardo Bierhals started his career playing with Brasil de Pelotas. He made his professional debut during the match against Caxias by the Campeonato Gaúcho of 2014.
