= Paulo Ricardo =

Paulo Ricardo may refer to:

- Paulo Ricardo (musician) (born 1962), Brazilian musician
- Padre Paulo Ricardo (born 1967), Brazilian priest and television host
- Paulo Ricardo (footballer, born 1987), Brazilian football right-back
- Paulo Ricardo (footballer, born 1994), Brazilian football centre-back
