= Ricardo Zampieri =

Brazilian politician (born 1995)

- Zampieri in 2020

Member of the Legislative Assembly of Paraná
- Incumbent
- Assumed office 1 February 2027

Personal details
- Born: 10 July 1995 (age 31)
- Party: Liberal Party

Ricardo Albertus Zampieri (born 10 July 1995) is a Brazilian politician who was elected member of the Legislative Assembly of Paraná in 2026. He has been a municipal councillor of Ponta Grossa since 2025, having previously served from 2017 to 2020.
