= Ricardo Pinto =

Ricardo Pinto may refer to:

- Ricardo Pinto (novelist) (born 1961), Portuguese novelist and computer scientist
- Ricardo Pinto (footballer, born 1965), Brazilian footballer
- Ricardo Pinto (baseball) (born 1994), Venezuelan baseball pitcher
- Ricardo Sá Pinto, Portuguese footballer
