= Schirn Kunsthalle Frankfurt =

Art museum in Frankfurt, Germany

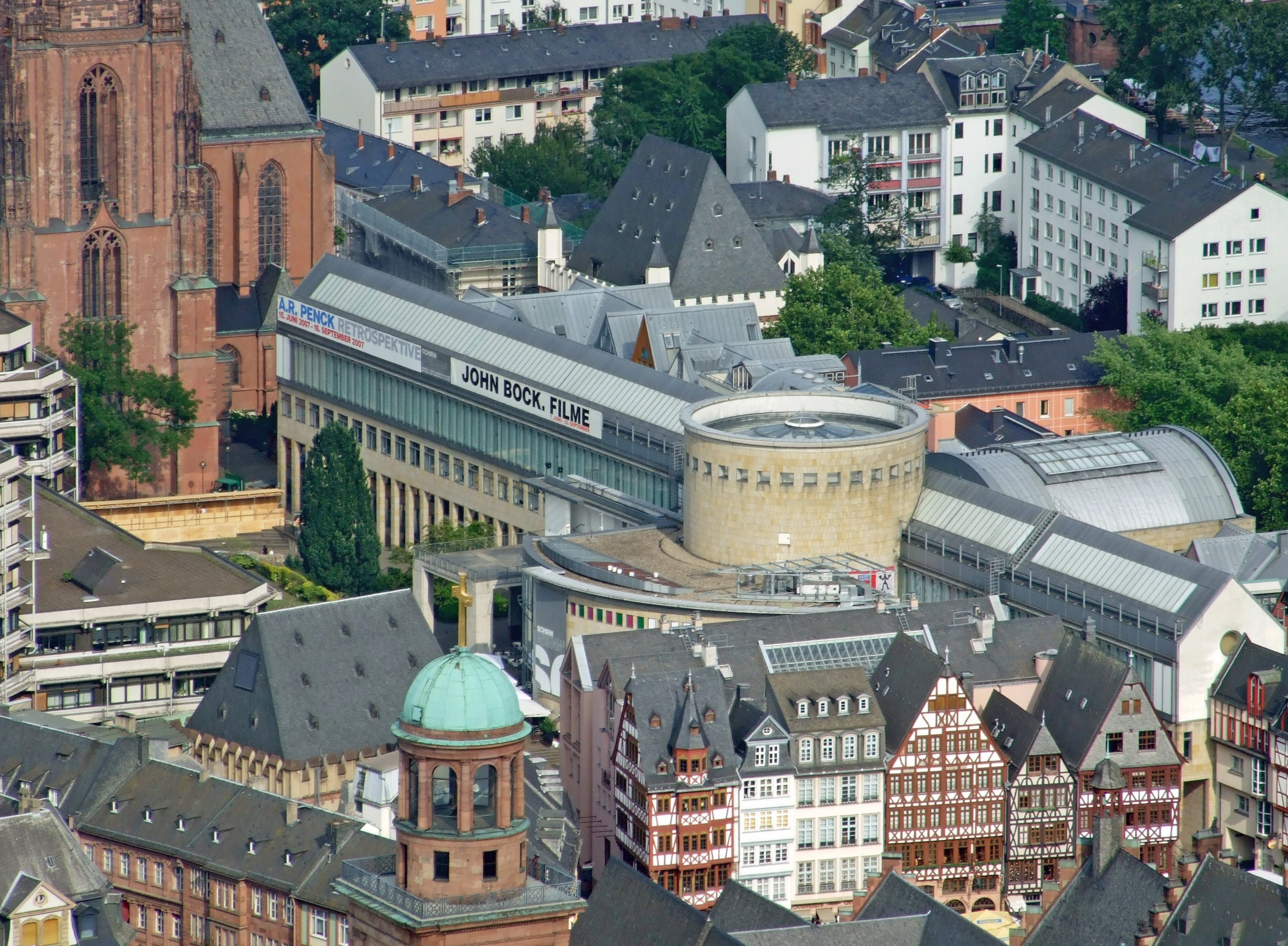
- The Kunsthalle from above in the north-west, 2007
- Established: 28 February 1986; 40 years ago
- Location: Römerberg, Altstadt, Museumsufer, Frankfurt
- Coordinates: 50°06′37″N 8°41′01″E
- Type: Kunsthalle, Art museum
- Visitors: 401,514 (2017); 308,137 (2018); 502,961 (2023)
- Director: Sebastian Baden
- Architect: BJSS
- Owners: Schirn Kunsthalle Frankfurt am Main GmbH, City of Frankfurt
- Public transit access: Dom/Römer (1 min); 11, 12, 14 Römer/Paulskirche (5 min)
- Website: schirn.de

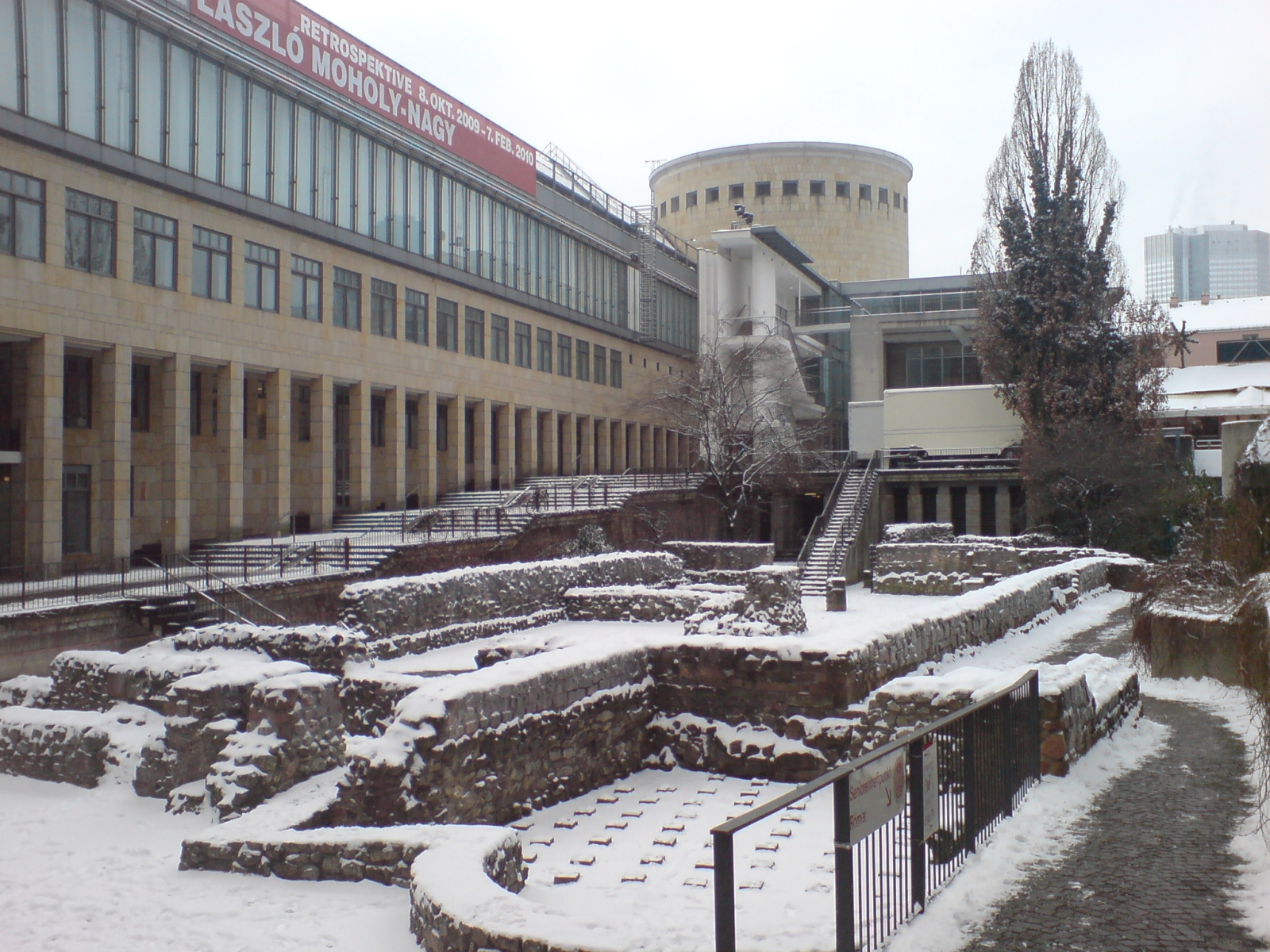
The Kunsthalle and preserved Ancient Roman ruins (with a hypocaust), seen from the east, before the beginning of the Dom-Römer-Project 2009

The Schirn Kunsthalle is a Kunsthalle in Frankfurt, Germany, located in the old city, between the Römer and the Frankfurt Cathedral; it is part of Frankfurt's Museumsufer (Museum Riverbank). The Schirn exhibits both modern and contemporary art. It is the main venue for temporary art exhibitions in Frankfurt. Exhibitions included retrospectives of Wassily Kandinsky, Marc Chagall, Alberto Giacometti, Bill Viola, and Yves Klein.

The Kunsthalle opened in 1986 and is financially supported by the city and the state. Historically, the German term "Schirn" denotes an open-air stall for the sale of goods, and such stalls were located there until the 19th century. The area was destroyed in 1944 during the Second World War and was not redeveloped until the building of the Kunsthalle. As an exhibition venue, the Schirn enjoys national and international renown, which it has attained through independent productions, publications, and exhibition collaborations with museums such as the Centre Pompidou, the Tate Gallery, the Solomon R. Guggenheim Museum, the Hermitage Museum, or the Museum of Modern Art.

== Location and architecture ==
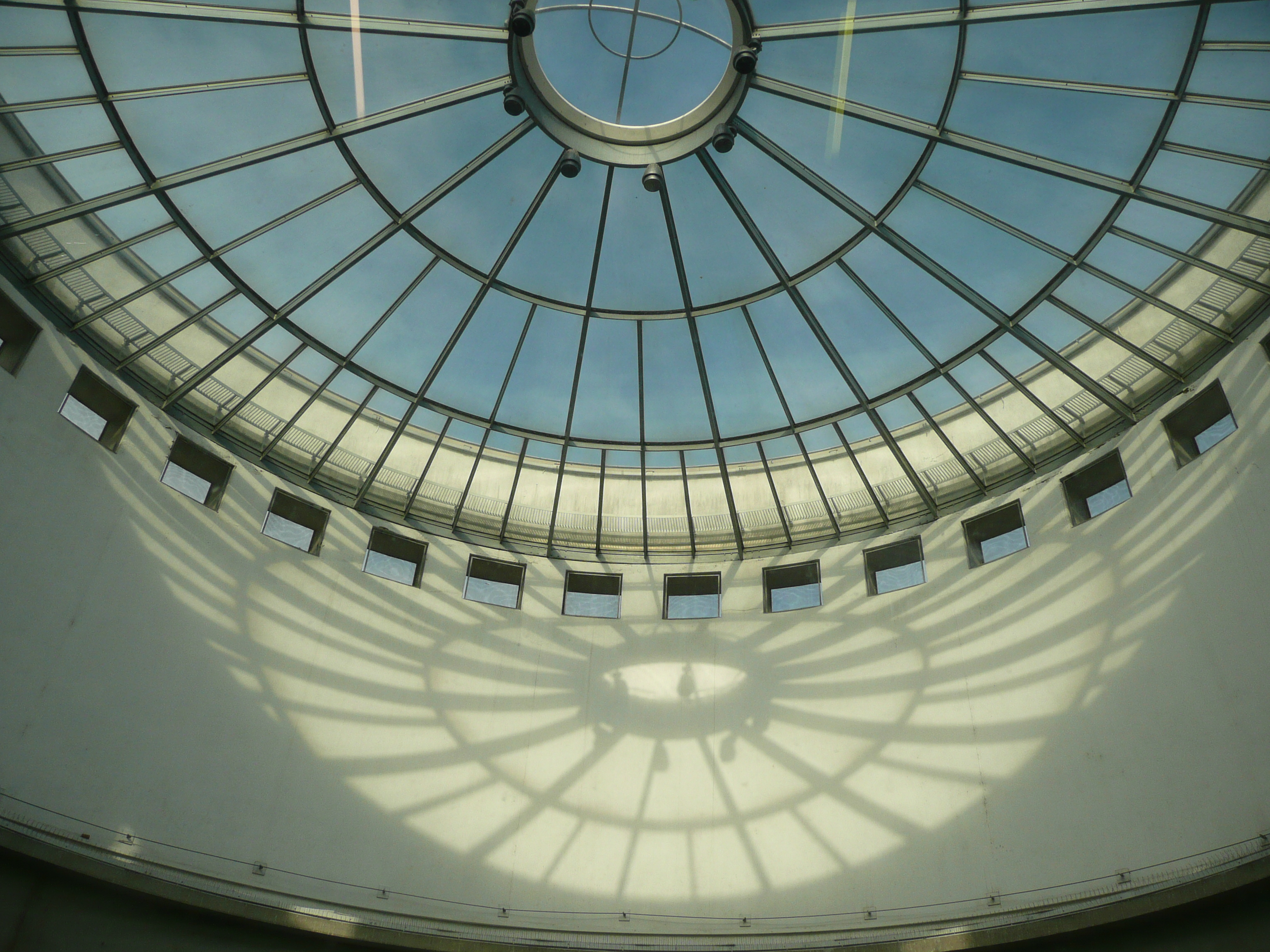
Rotunda inside the Schirn

"Frankfurt is not yet ready for a Römerberg development in this generation, or: the square should remain completely open, and — the most hotly contested position of all — can one even dare to undertake a historical reconstruction of the east side of the Römerberg featuring the 'Black Star,' the 'Angel,' the 'Wild Man,' and others?" said then Mayor Walter Wallmann ironically in August 1980, cited in the foreword of an issue of the "Publications Series of the Building Department on Construction Projects of the City of Frankfurt am Main." In fact, policymakers had already decided otherwise. A national urban planning and architectural design competition, based on City Council Resolution No. 2302 of July 31, 1978, called for a Kunsthalle and the historic reconstruction of the eastern row of buildings and the "Schwarzer Stern". It was announced on October 15, 1979, for the territory of the Federal Republic of Germany and West Berlin. In addition, three foreign architects were admitted: Charles Willard Moore, Herman Hertzberger, and Bruno Reichlin. Under the chairmanship of Max Bächer, the jury - which also included Heinrich Klotz (the founder of Deutsches Architekturmuseum) as an expert - decided to award the first of 8 prizes to the architectural firm BJSS from Berlin.

The construction of the "Kunsthalle Schirn" started in the beginning of 1983 and has an overall exhibition space of more than 2,000 m^{2} (22,000 ft^{2}). The opening took place on 28 February 1986.

The building in Frankfurt's historic city center is clad with light sandstone. It consists of several interlocking structures, each of which features a geometric floor plan. The most prominent structural element is an approximately 140-meter-long and 10-meter-wide nave, five stories high. This exhibition building runs from east to west. Bangert designed the longhouse as reminiscence of the 150-meter-long and 15-meter-wide outdoor space of the Uffizi in Florence (Piazzale degli Uffizi).

Additional structural elements are arranged somewhat to the west of the middle of this longhouse along an imaginary transverse axis: to the south, facing Saalgasse, a multistory cube with a rectangular floor plan (ca. 18 x 25 m), and adjoining it, parallel to the longhouse, an elongated rectangular expansion. On the northern side of the main axis lies the Schirn's most striking feature next to the main hall: the rotunda, which, with a diameter of about 20 meters, forms the monumental main entrance. Covered by a glass dome, this open space is the tallest part of the Schirn.

A passageway carved into the building runs through the rotunda, following the course of the old Bendergasse. To the north, beyond the alley, another semicircular section adjoins the main structure; with a radius slightly more than twice that of the rotunda, it shares the same center point. This section, separated from the main exhibition hall by Bendergasse, houses the Schirn Café. Finally, a rectangular opening has been incorporated into the eastern end of this section. In it stood, at street level, a table-like structure approximately two storeys high, in the style of a free-standing loggia. It was demolished in August 2012 as part of the Dom-Römer Project, to give way for the reconstruction of Frankfurt’s Old Town.

In collaboration with the Kunsthalle, two rows of houses were built directly to the south – that is, on the northern side of Saalgasse – separated from one another by the southern Schirn cube. These buildings feature proportions and plot sizes typical of the old town, but are designed entirely in the style of the 1980s, in a partially very colourful postmodern style. The Kunsthalle and the rows of houses are grouped around two semi-public courtyards (accessible but not for public use), which compensate for the difference in height between Benderstraße and Saalgasse (the cathedral hill). Access from the Saalgasse houses to the courtyard is provided via the first floor.

Since 2002, the Schirn has had a new interior designed by the architectural firm Kuehn Malvezzi. The foyer is immersed in alternating colours thanks to modern RGB lighting technology.

In connection with the demolition of the adjacent Technical Town Hall architect Christoph Mäckler, amongst others, proposed demolishing parts of the Schirn as well, in order to frame the historic Coronation Route from the Imperial Cathedral to the Römerberg with buildings once again. After initially invoking his copyright to defend his work, Bangert later agreed to a compromise that provided for the demolition of the freestanding 'Great Table' on the north side of the building. This made possible the Dom-Römer Project for the reconstruction of several buildings in the old town between 2012 and 2016.

== History ==
The name "Schirn" derives from the history of its location. The word originally denoted an "open sales booth." The site on which the Schirn Kunsthalle is currently situated was Frankfurt's densely populated historic city center until it was destroyed during the Second World War, on 22 March 1944. The sales booths of the city's butchers' guild stood in the narrow alleys between today's Schirn and the Main River until the mid-19th century.

Starting in spring 2025, the Schirn Kunsthalle will close for several years due to extensive renovations and will temporarily move to the building of the Dondorf printing company in the Bockenheim district of Frankfurt (50°07′16″N 8°39′10″E).

=== Directors ===
Christoph Vitali was the director of the Schirn from 1985 to 1993, and during that same period the chief executive of the Kulturgesellschaft Frankfurt mbH. He established the Schirn as an exhibition venue. His successor was Hellmut Seemann. The Austrian Max Hollein was the director from 2001 to 2016. In 2006 Hollein also took over the directorship of the Städel Museum and the Liebieghaus. With exceptional exhibitions, provocative titles, and improved financial resources he has increased the number of visitors to the Schirn threefold. Since 2022, Sebastian Baden is director of the Schirn, succeeding Philipp Demandt.

== Exhibitions ==
As of 2022, more than 250 exhibitions have been presented at the Schirn since its opening. These have included major survey exhibitions on, for example, Viennese Art Nouveau, Expressionism, Dada and Surrealism, on "Esprit Montmartre," women Expressionists, "German Pop," on the history of photography, and on subjects such as shopping, art and consumption, visual art of the Stalin era, the Nazarenes, and new Romanticism in contemporary art. As of 2022, more than 9.5 million people have visited the Schirn.

=== Modern art exhibitions ===
Monograph exhibitions have been presented on artists such as Yves Klein, Wassily Kandinsky, Alberto Giacometti, Henri Matisse, James Ensor, James Lee Byars, Yves Klein, László Moholy-Nagy, Georges Seurat, Odilon Redon, Phillip Guston, Jean-Michel Basquiat, Edvard Munch, Théodore Géricault, Frida Kahlo and Helene Schjerfbeck.

Recent exhibitions:

- Marc Chagall "World in Turmoil" with paintings from the 1930s and 1940s between 4 November 2022 to 19 February 2023 (243,582 visitors).
- Niki de Saint Phalle "Die Retrospektive" between 3 February 2023 and 21 May 2023
- Lyonel Feininger, Retrospektive between 27 October 2023 and 18 February 2024

Some of the exhibitions with the most visitors in the history of the Schirn are:

- Wassily Kandinsky "The First Soviet Retrospective" (1989) (189,385 visitors)
- Henri Matisse "Drawing with Scissors" (2003) (138,234 visitors)
- "Women Impressionists—Berthe Morisot, Mary Cassatt, Eva Gonzalès, Marie Bracquemond" (2008) (184,793 visitors)
- Edvard Munch "The Modern Eye" (2012) (213,177 visitors)
- "Esprit Montmartre. Bohemian Life in Paris around 1900" (Picasso, Van Gogh, Toulouse-Lautrec) (2014) (186,512 visitors)

=== Contemporary art exhibitions ===
Contemporary artists such as Peter Doig, Bill Viola, Jeff Koons, Doug Aitken, Thomas Hirschhorn, Carsten Nicolai, Jonathan Meese, John Bock, Terence Koh, Aleksandra Mir, Eberhard Havekost, Mike Bouchet, Julian Schnabel, Yoko Ono and Tobias Rehberger have been presented in solo exhibitions.

== See also ==
- Frankfurt art theft (1994)
