= Ricardo Guilherme Dicke =

Brazilian writer (1936–2008)

- Born: 16 October 1936; Chapada dos Guimarães, Brazil
- Died: 9 July 2008 (aged 71)
- Education: Universidade Federal do Rio de Janeiro
- Writing career
- Notable work: Deus de Caim

Ricardo Guilherme Dicke (16 October 1936 – 9 July 2008) was a Brazilian writer.

== Life and career ==
The eldest of seven children, Dicke was born to a German father and a Brazilian mother in Vila Raizama, Chapada dos Guimarães. He moved to Cuiabá at the age of five and to Rio de Janeiro at the age of 29. He studied philosophy at the Federal University of Rio de Janeiro (UFRJ). He returned to Cuiabá in 1975. Four years later, he began a master's degree in philosophy at the same URFJ, under the supervision of Gert Alberto Bornheim, but did not complete it. In 1968, he published Deus de Caim (The God of Cain), winner of an honorable mention in the previous year's Walmap Literature Prize; the jury included Guimarães Rosa, Jorge Amado and Antonio Olinto.

Despite being little known during his lifetime, Dicke's work had famous admirers, such as Hilda Hilst, who considered him a "giant" of Brazilian literature.

Ricardo Guilherme Dicke's works began to be rediscovered throughout Brazil through the work of researcher Rodrigo Simon de Moraes, from Princeton University, who in 2021 defended his doctoral thesis, "In Search of Those Who Were Lost: Unpublished Stories by Ricardo Guilherme Dicke", at the Department of Literary Theory at Unicamp. The research presents previously unpublished texts by the writer, as well as a revised biography of the author. The stories revealed by the research will be published by Record, which, in 2024, under the researcher's supervision, published the novel Madona dos Páramos]

== Works ==
- O Deus de Caim (1968)
- Como o Silêncio (1968)
- Caieira (1978)
- Madona dos Páramos (1981)
- Último Horizonte (1988)
- A Chave do Abismo (1986)
- Cerimônias do Esquecimento (1995)
- Rio Abaixo dos Vaqueiros (2001)
- Salário dos Poetas (2001)
- Conjunctio Oppositorum no Grande Sertão (2002)
- Toada do Esquecimento & Sinfonia Equestre (2006)
- A Proximidade do Mar e a Ilha” (2011- posthumous)
- O Velho Moço e Outros Contos”, (2011- posthumous)
- Cerimônias do Sertão”(2011- posthumous)
- Os Semelhantes (2011- posthumous)
