= Dankwart =

Dankwart is a German given name. Notable people with the given name include:

- Dankwart Danckwerts (1933–2012), German sociologist
- Dankwart Guratzsch (born 1939), German journalist
- Dankwart Rustow (1924–1996), American political scientist

== See also ==
- Dankvart Dreyer (1816–1852), Danish artist
- Dankward Buwitt (born 1939), German politician
- Dankwardt Park, Burlington, Iowa, US
