= New Frankfurt Old Town =

Quarter between Dom and Römer in Frankfurt, Germany

Coordinates: 50°06′40″N 8°40′59″E

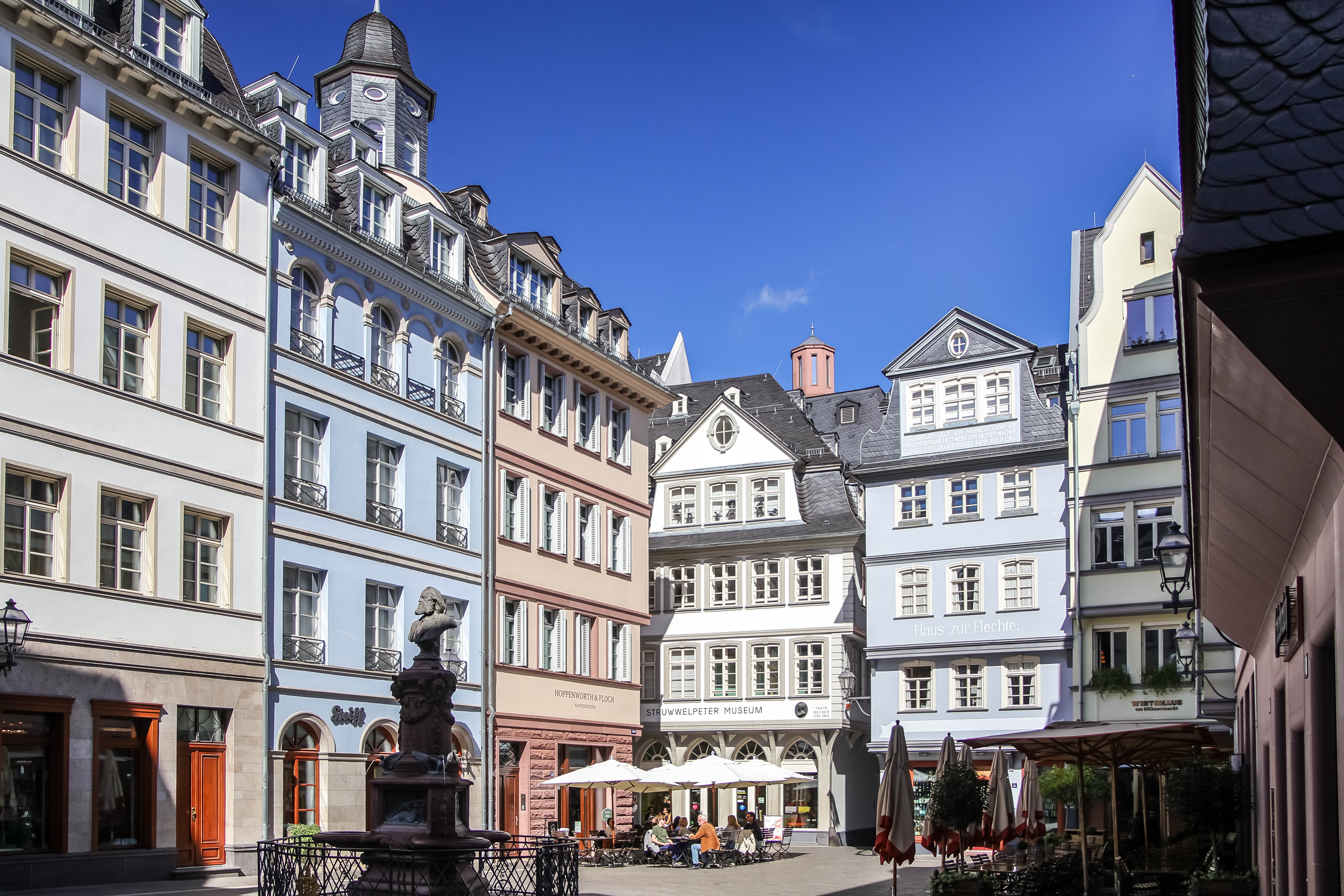
Hühnermarkt in 2025

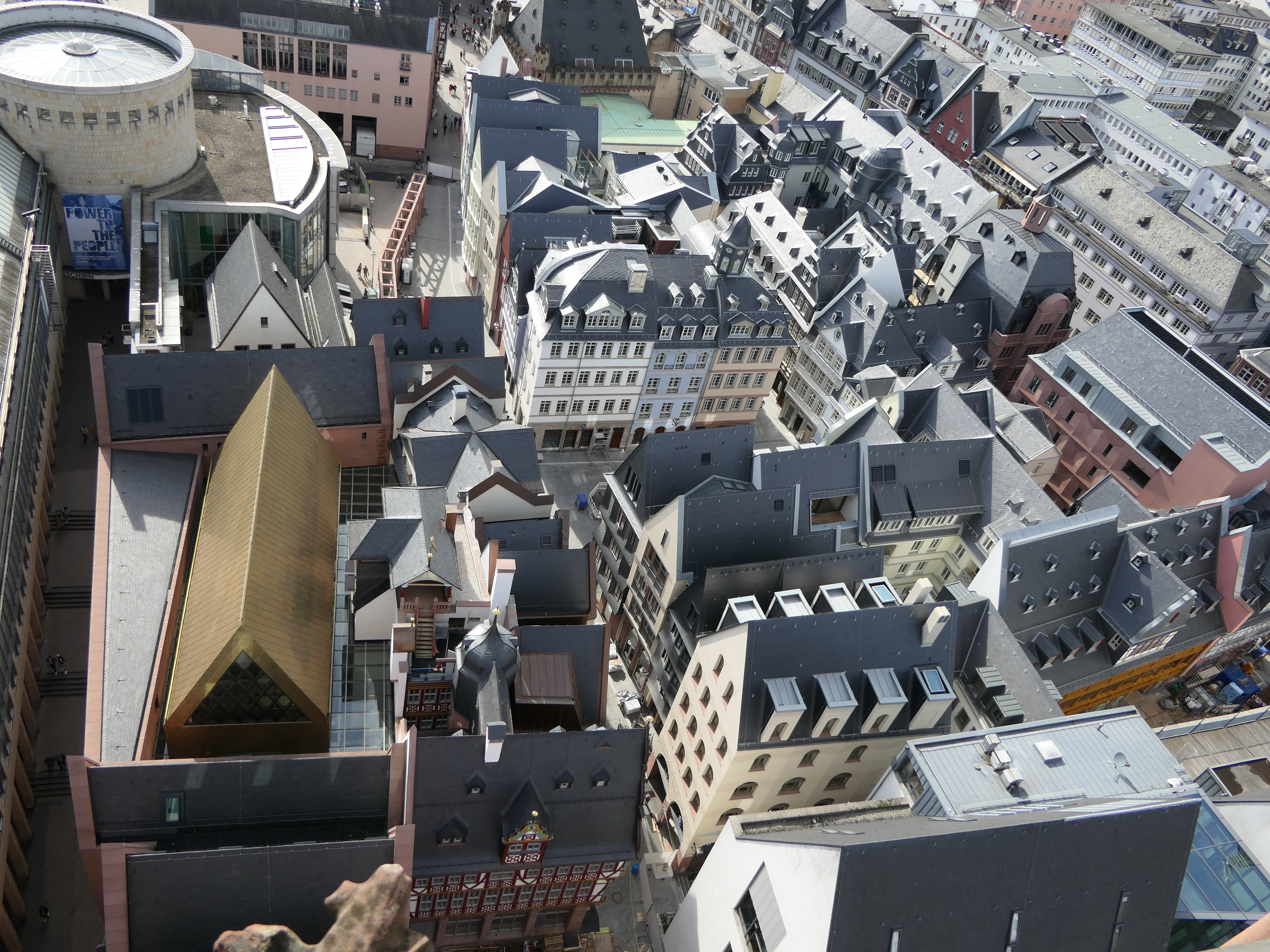
View from Frankfurt Cathedral to the Dom-Römer area (April 2018), on the left the town house on the market

The New Frankfurt Old Town (German: Neue Frankfurter Altstadt), also known as the Dom-Römer Quarter (German: Dom-Römer-Viertel or -Quartier), is the centre of the old town of Frankfurt am Main, Germany. It was reconstructed from 2012 to 2018 as part of a major urban development project called the Dom-Römer Project (German: Dom-Römer-Projekt).

== Project ==
The project redesigned and developed a 7,000 m^{2} (75,000 sq ft) property between Römerberg in the west and Domplatz in the east, delimited by Braubachstrasse in the north and the Schirn Kunsthalle in the south, in an effort to remake the old city centre, the Altstadt (old town), which was severely damaged during World War II, in the style of the pre-war architecture. Before its widespread destruction during the war, the Frankfurt old town contained one of the largest collections of historical timber frame constructions (German: Fachwerkhäuser), with around 1250 buildings primarily from the renaissance and medieval era.

New Frankfurt Old Town
Neue Frankfurter Altstadt
1 Frankfurt Cathedral
2 Römer
3 Schirn Kunsthalle
4 Steinernes Haus
5 Mohrenkopf
6 Goldenes Lämmchen
7 Esslinger
8 Hessischer Hof
9 Hof zum Rebstock
10 Zur Flechte
11 Kleines Seligeneck
12 Schönau
13 Hauptzollamt / MMK
14 Goldene Schere
15 Würzgarten
16 Alter Burggraf
17 Zu den drei Römern
18 Altes Kaufhaus
19 Goldene Waage

Due to the heavy bombing of Frankfurt am Main in World War II, most of the city's old town was destroyed. Efforts to rebuild parts of the historic fabric of the old town began in the 1950s with the Römer city hall, which was built as a modern office building behind the old façade that was still standing after the war. An underground car park was built under the Römerberg square, and on top of the Romerberg area, in front of the cathedral, the brutalist Technisches Rathaus ("Technical City Hall") was built in 1974. The Technisches Rathaus was demolished in 2010–11, and the reconstruction of the old town core began. The project was built on top of a 1970s underground multi-storey car park and the U-Bahn Line B station.

Civic engagement in particular led to the old town-oriented planning of the Dom-Römer project. The 35 designs of new buildings were determined in several architectural competitions with more than 170 participants. The foundation stone was laid in January 2012. At the end of 2017, all of the houses' exteriors were largely completed. On 9 May 2018, the fences were removed and the new district was made fully accessible to the public. From 28 to 30 September 2018, a three-day festival was held for the opening, which attracted between 250,000 and 300,000 visitors. In March 2019, the Frankfurt Dom-Römer project received the prestigious international MIPIM award.

== History ==
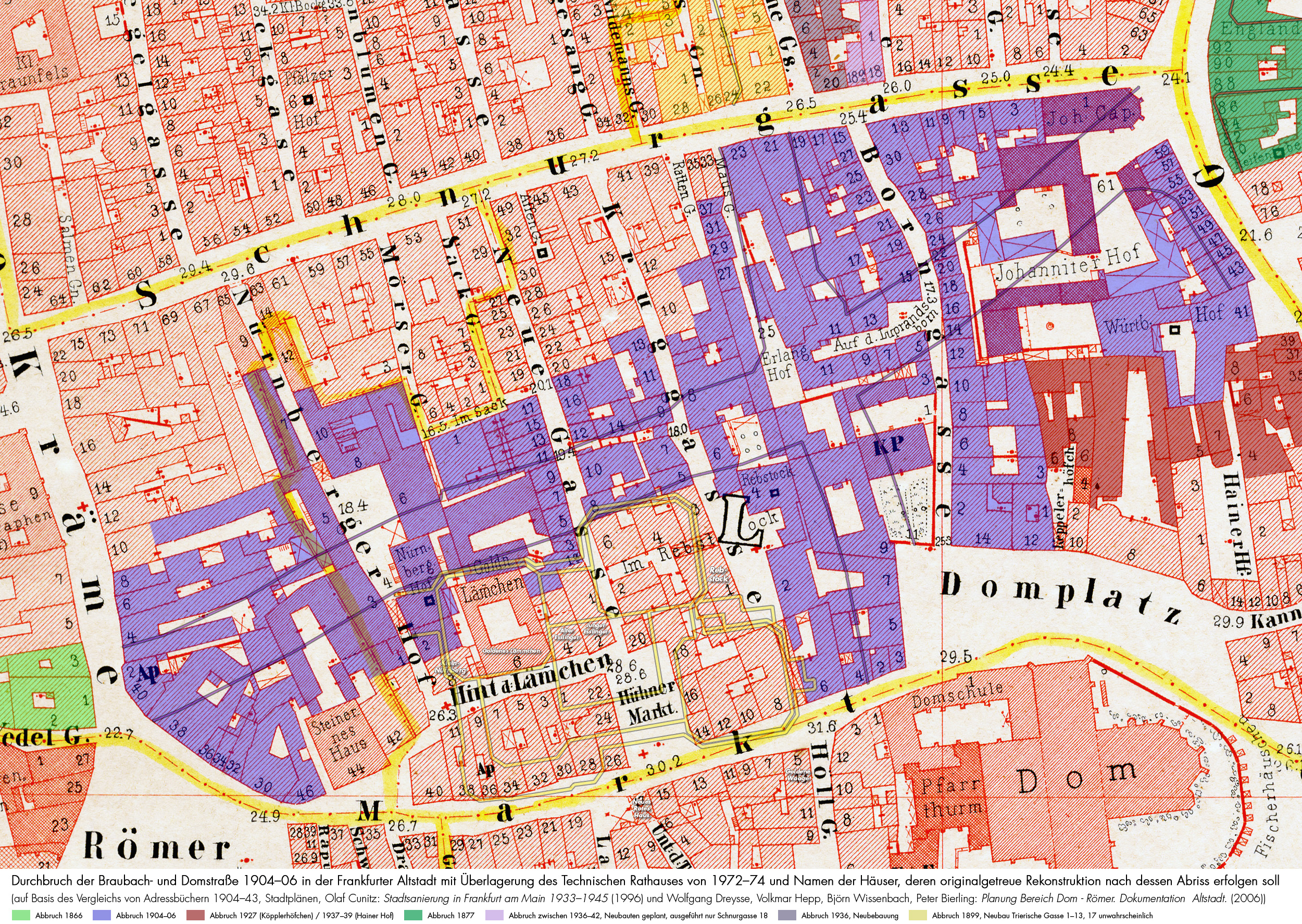
A map of the old town from 1862 with overlay representing the future developments and demolitions. (chromolithography by Friedrich August Ravenstein). The yellow and green marked buildings were demolished as early as the 19th century, the purple buildings are those demolished to make way for the Braubachstrasse, created in 1904. The areas marked in dark red were torn down in 1927. An overlay of the 2007 demolished Technisches Rathaus can also be seen.

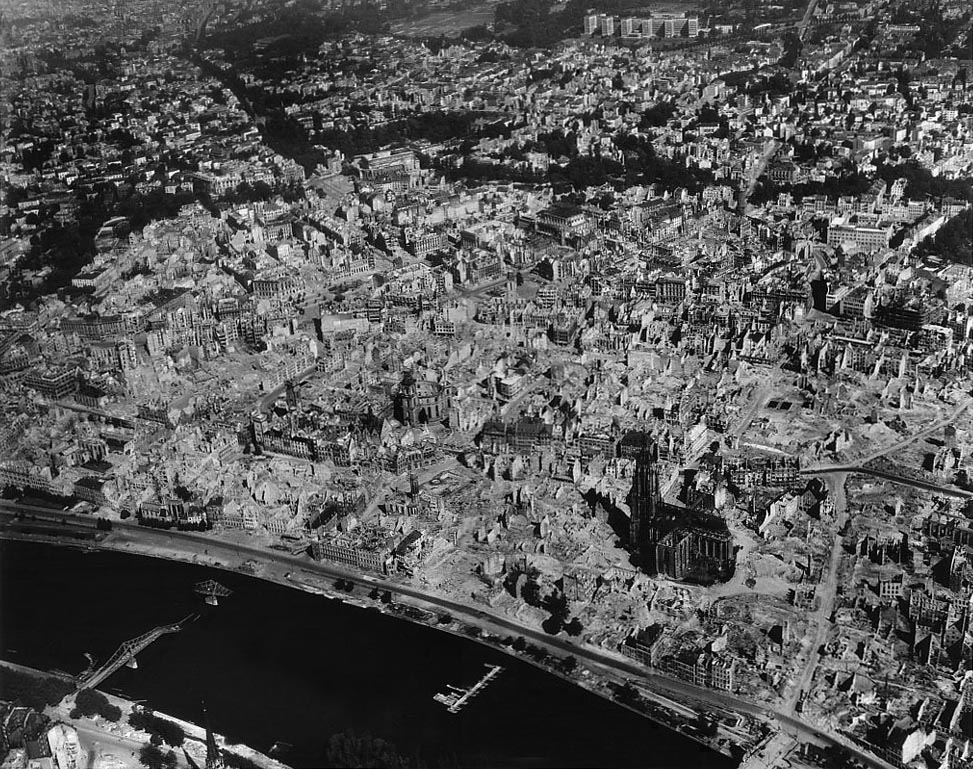
The destroyed old town in June 1945

During the Second World War, the medieval old town of Frankfurt am Main, until then one of the best preserved in Central Europe, was almost completely destroyed by bombing. Only a few historical buildings remained, and in the post-war period, other damaged buildings were also demolished, mostly in favour of "car-friendly" traffic planning. There were very few external reconstructions of buildings and the majority of the former old town was rebuilt in the style of the 1950s, largely abandoning the historic street network.

The area between Römerberg and the cathedral remained as a rubble clearance wasteland for many years and its development was debated for a long time. In 1953, archaeologists uncovered the remains of a Roman settlement, and traces of the Carolingian period, beneath the area of the high medieval layers. The archaeological finds were preserved and made accessible to the public as an archaeological garden.

In 1966, the Frankfurt subway was extended under the old town. When the Dom/Römer underground station was built in 1970–71, it destroyed much of the oldest section of Frankfurt (which had not yet been archaeologically examined).

Subsequently, after years of discussion, the Technisches Rathaus was created in 1972–1974 as the seat of the technical offices of the city administration. Five old town houses on Braubachstrasse that had survived the war were demolished to excavate the construction pit. The building, built in the brutalist architectural style, dominated the former old town, in a style very different from that of the small-scale buildings in the area. The construction costs totalled DM 93 million according to the word transcript of the 19th session of the town parliament on December 15th 1994.

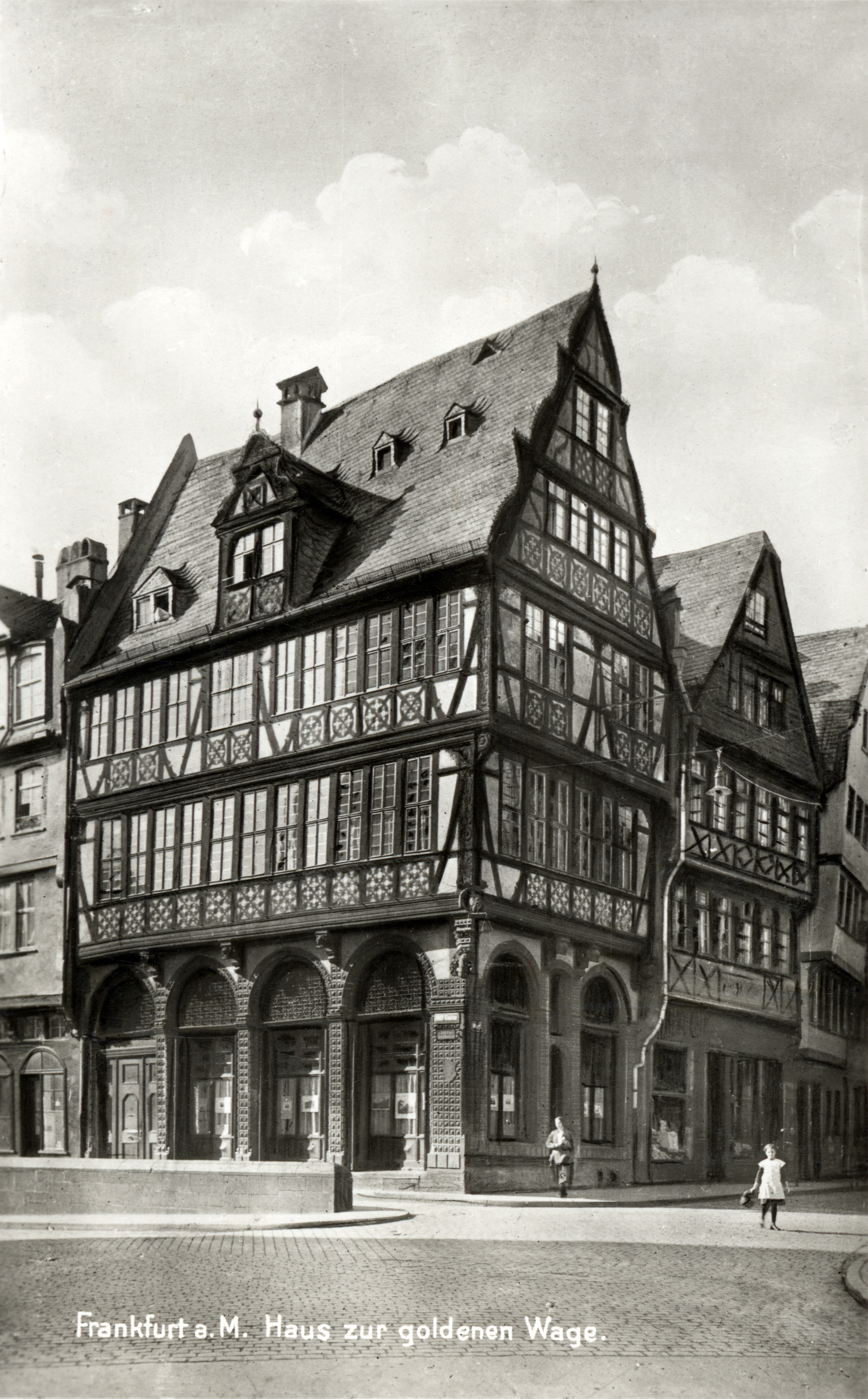
Haus zur goldenen Waage, c. 1900

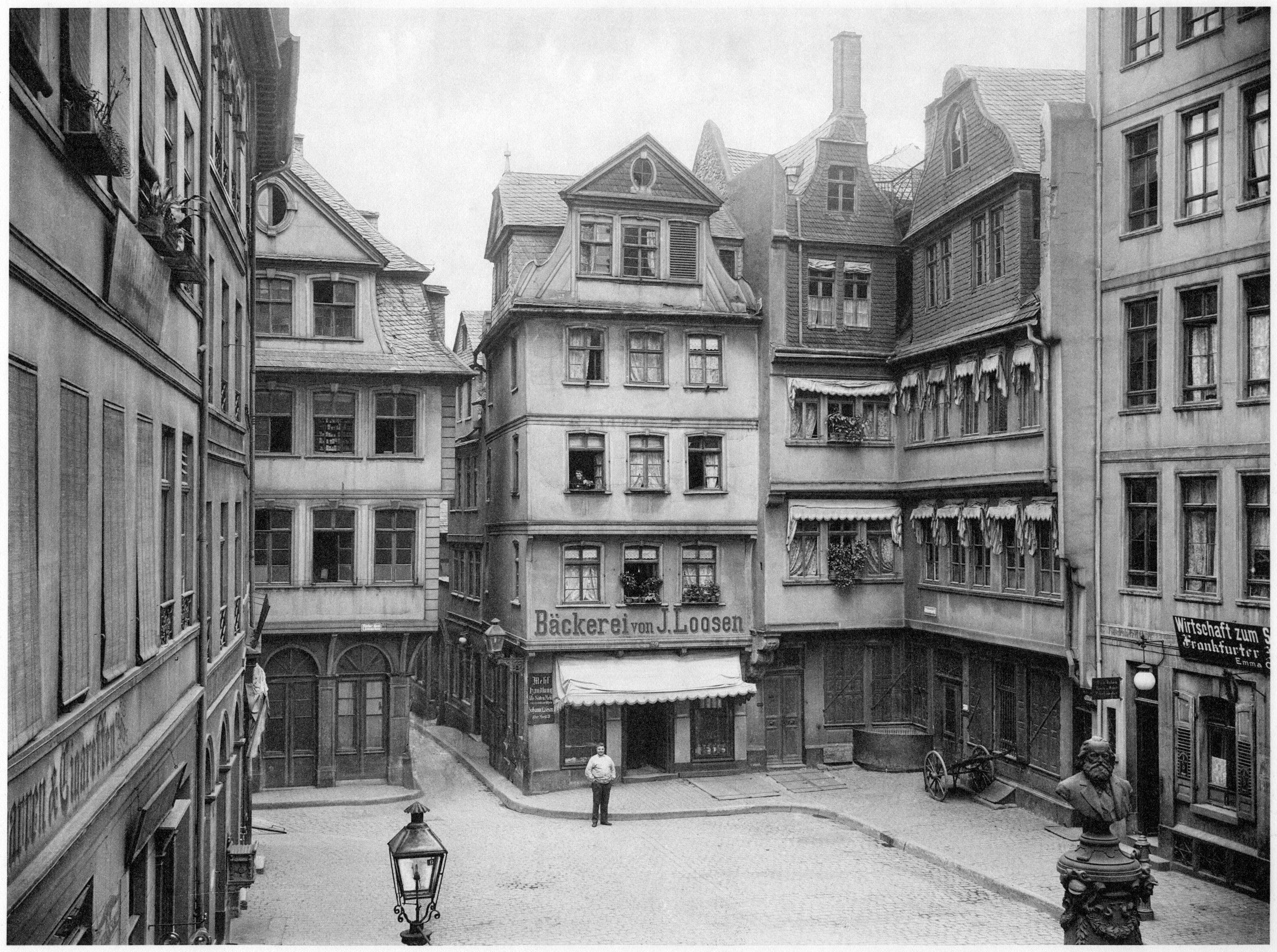
Centre of the Dom-Römer area: the Chicken Market, 1903

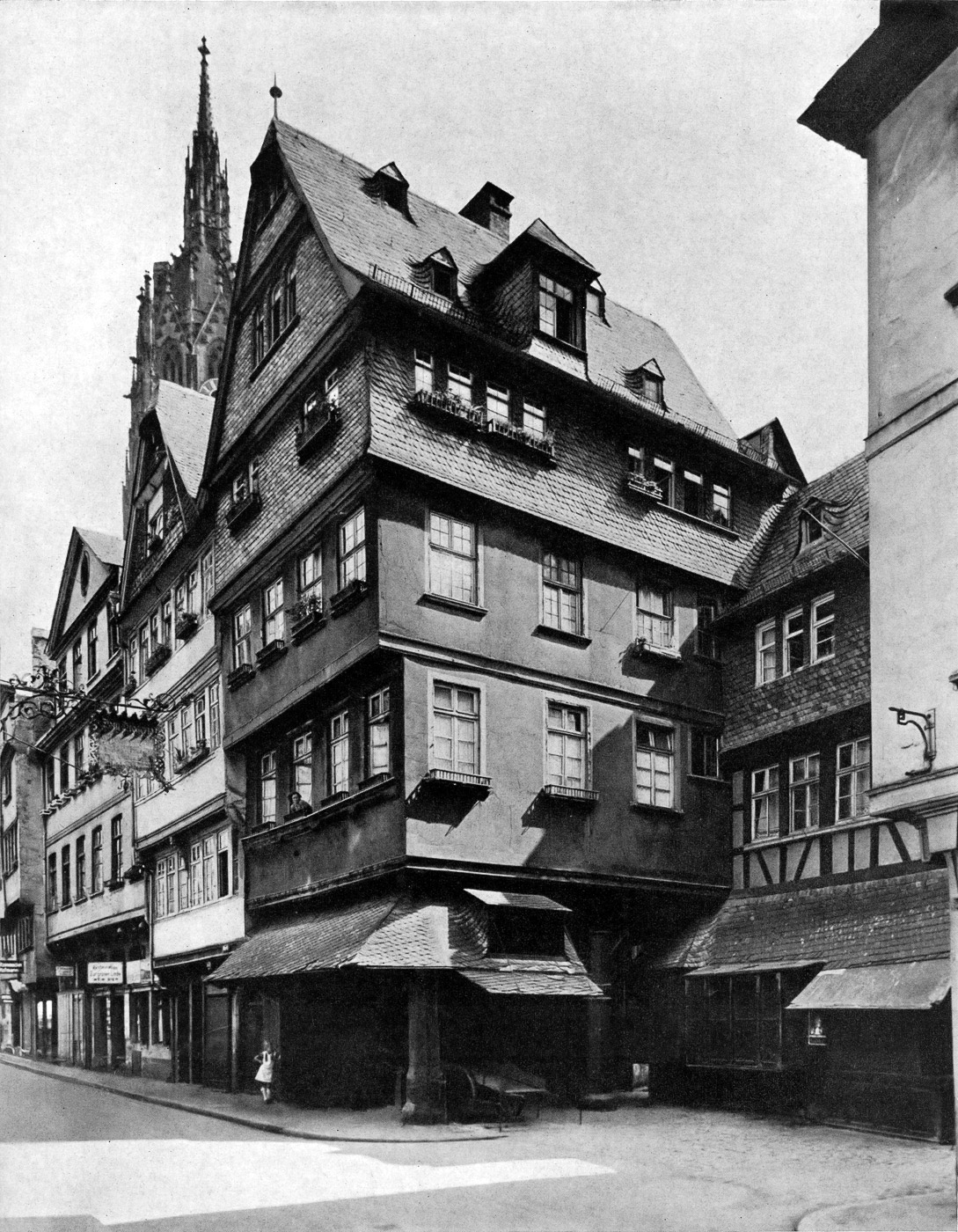
New Red House on the market, c. 1910

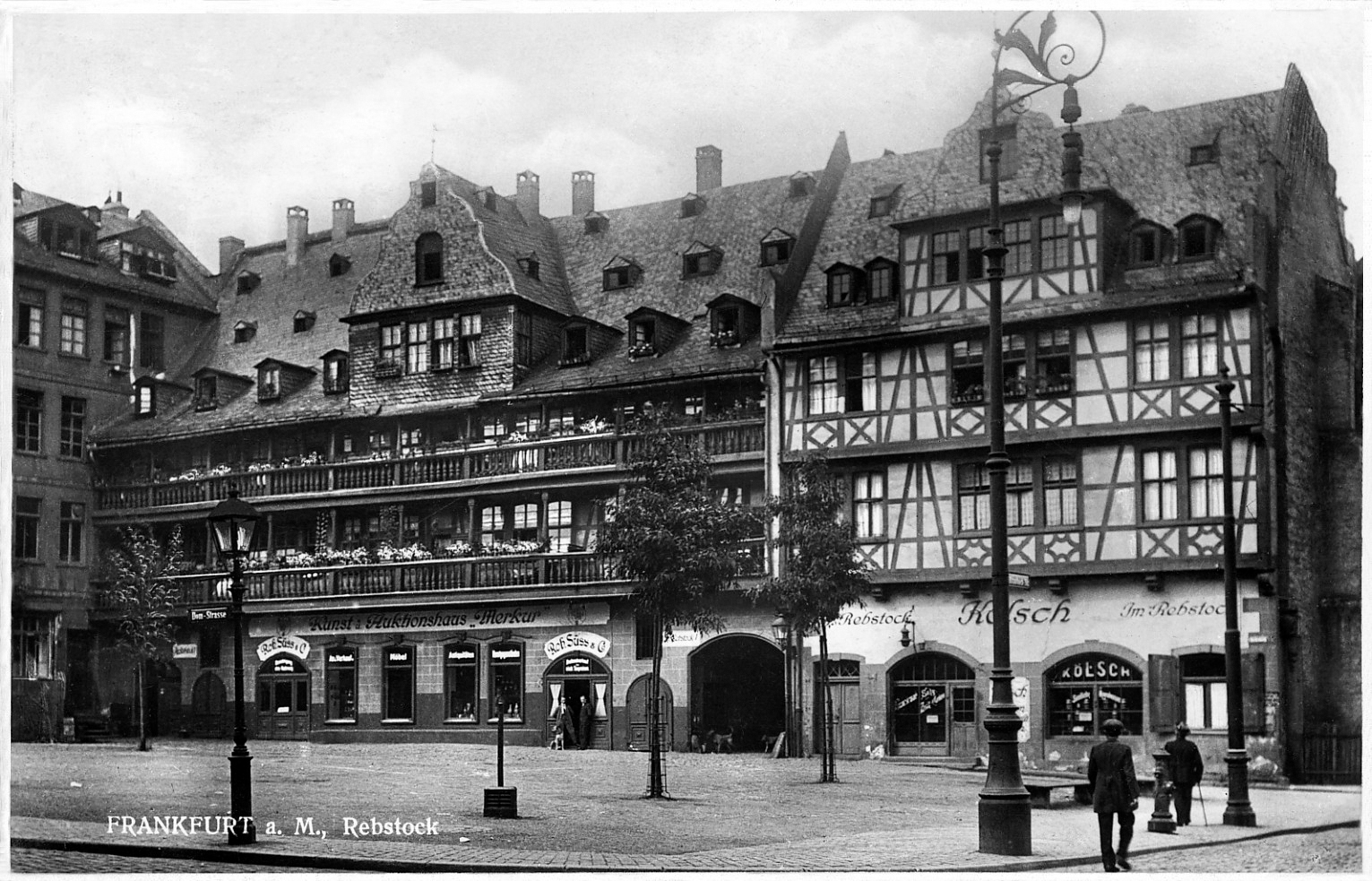
Rebstock House (left) and Braubachstrasse 21, c. 1910

== Planning history ==
=== The 1980 National Competition for the Dom-Römerberg Area ===
“Frankfurt is not yet ready for a Roemerberg development in this generation, or: the square should remain completely open, and — the most hotly contested position of all — can one even dare to undertake a historical reconstruction of the east side of the Roemerberg featuring the ‘Black Star,’ the ‘Angel,’ the ‘Wild Man,’ and others?” said then Mayor Walter Wallmann ironically in August 1980 in the foreword to an issue of the “Publications Series of the Building Department on Construction Projects of the City of Frankfurt am Main.” In fact, policymakers had already decided otherwise. The urban planning design competition, based on City Council Resolution No. 2302 of July 31, 1978, called for the historic reconstruction of the eastern row of buildings and the “Schwarzer Stern” and was announced on October 15, 1979, for the territory of the Federal Republic of Germany and West Berlin. In addition, three foreign architects were “admitted”: Charles Moore, Herman Hertzberger, and Bruno Reichlin. Under the chairmanship of Max Bächer, the jury - which also included Heinrich Klotz (the founder of Deutsches Architekturmuseum as an expert - decided to award the first of 8 prizes to the architectural firm BJSS (Dietrich Bangert, Bernd Jansen, Stefan Jan Scholz, and Axel Schultes).

The central section of the so-called Schirn was constructed by the BJSS firm beginning in 1983 and inaugurated in February 1986. The postmodern individual buildings on Saalgasse were later directly contracted by the City Building Department. With the exception of the second prize (PAS - Projektgruppe Jourdan, Müller et al.) and Charles Moore (sixth prize) - to participants in the lower ranks (Peter A. Hermes/Berlin, 10th place), to offices in Frankfurt or to architects who had received special prizes or had participated “out of competition,” such as Adolfo Natalini.

=== Initial development 2004 ===
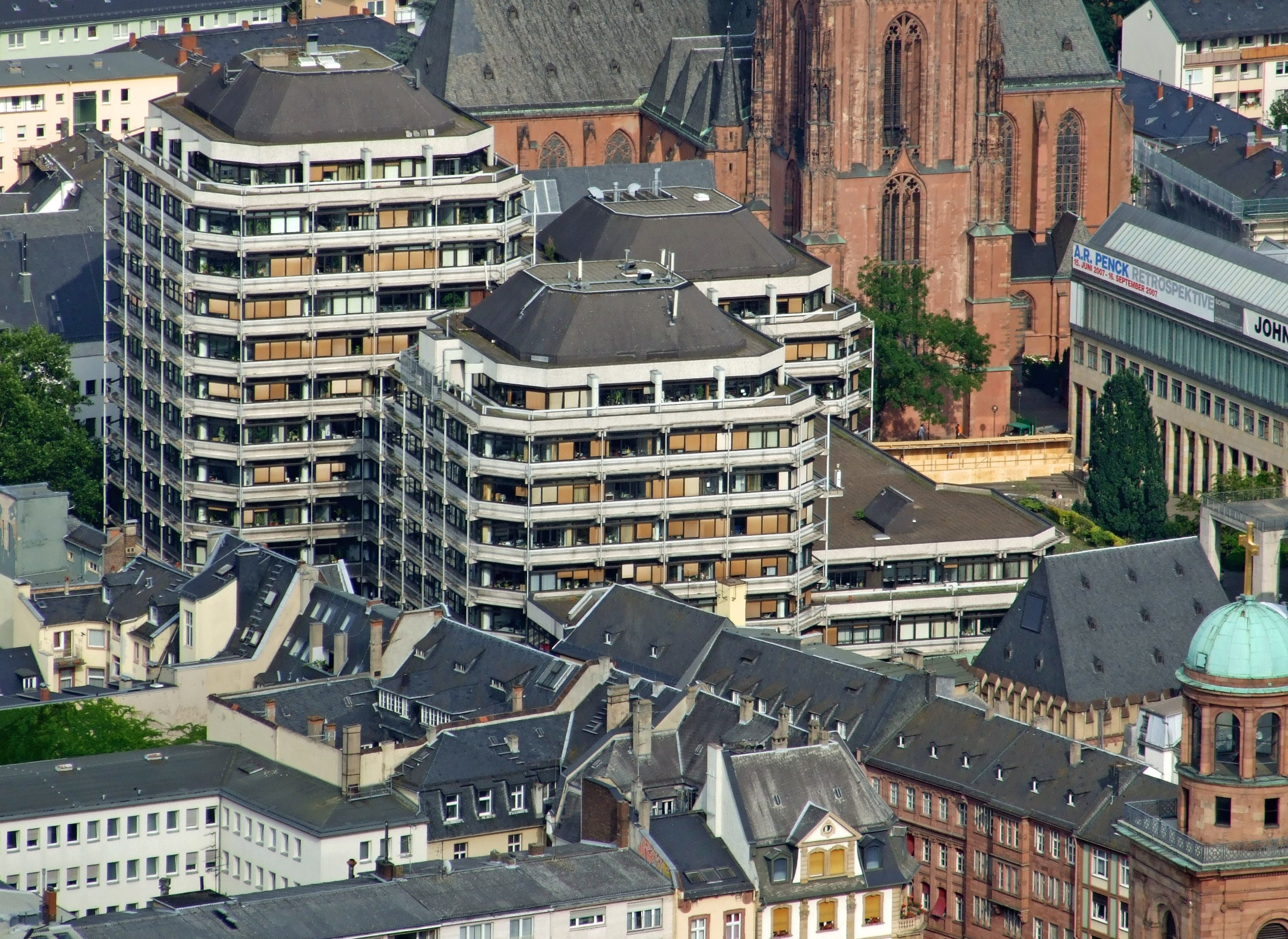
Technisches Rathaus, 2007

In 2004, developers discussed plans for renovating the 30-year-old technical town hall.

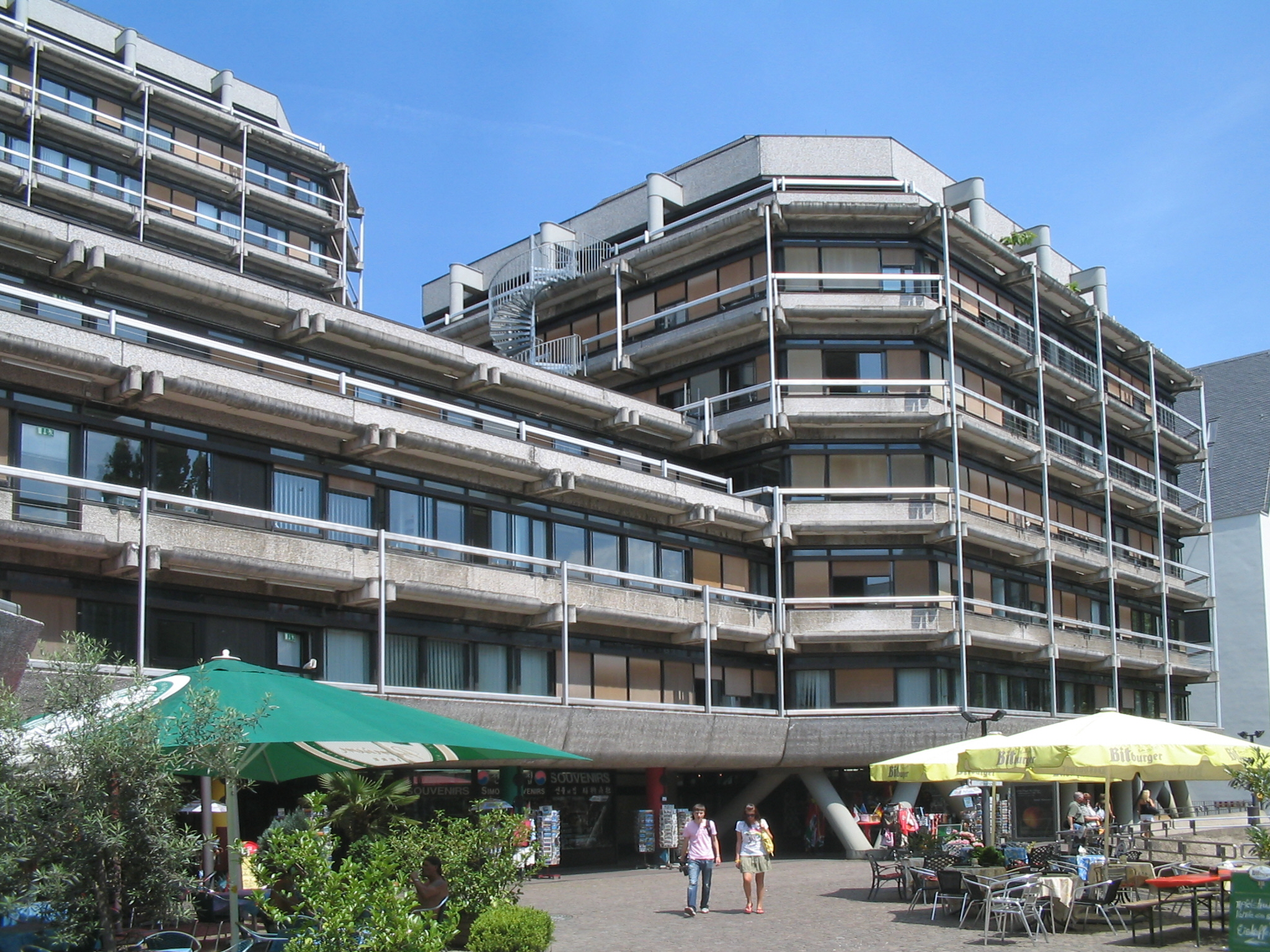
The facades of the Technisches Rathaus, July 2008

The city council then decided in December 2004 to carry out an urban planning ideas competition with the option of either renovation of the current building or demolition and subsequent small-scale development in its place. There was demand for a return of the small-scale structures that used to form the Gothic old town. The councils competition was considered an unusual procedure. The Chamber of Architects in Wiesbaden opposed the competition approach and considered the obligation to submit two drafts impractical and called for a clear decision by politicians. The competition, originally announced for January 2005, ultimately did not take place.

In May 2005, the political powers decided not to pursue the competition any further. They nevertheless insisted that the following requirements be in place for any further urban planning competition: small-scale buildings with facades and roofs need to fit harmoniously into the old town, housing 20,000 m^{2} of gross floor space within the property boundaries of the Technisches Rathaus, with overbuilding of the archaeological garden, but maintenance of it as an indoor museum, and a restoration of the old "coronation path" street layout between the cathedral and the Roman. The name "Coronation Trail", an alternative name for the alley market (also known as the Old Market), which existed until 1945, arose from the fact that a total of 16 coronation ceremonies for Roman-German kings were held in Frankfurt from the 14th to the 18th century. 20 offices took part in the urban planning competition.

In August 2005, an application was submitted suggesting the reconstruction of some important historic buildings that had been destroyed in the war. However, the winning design chosen by the Frankfurt office KSP Engel and Zimmermann in September 2005 met only a few of these requirements. In this plan, the "Coronation Trail" was not going to follow the original route, but was to be built in a straight diagonal line from the Stone House (Steinernes Haus) to the cathedral tower. The plan involved construction of large scale buildings and a trapezoidal shaped square was planned at the level of the archaeological garden, which, like the diagonal to the cathedral tower, had never existed in a similar form in Frankfurt's urban history.

At the presentation of the draft, however, Edwin Schwarz (CDU), head of the planning department, emphasised that it was only a suggestion of how the required building dimensions should be made: "What can be seen here will not be built this way". Other architectural competitions would decide on the final design. Schwarz also spoke out against the reconstruction of individual historical buildings, since these would then stand next to modern buildings.

The winning design was received with controversy. People criticised the layout of the "Coronation Trail" and the buildings were felt to be too massive, with flat roofs designs that did not harmonise with the gable roofs of the old town. The city council decided to revise the draft significantly and to lean more closely toward the historical model. In September 2005, the Frankfurt SPD proposed to leave the decision on the design for the area up to a citizens referendum. The SPD said that two or three competing designs with historical or historicizing and modern buildings should be developed.

In October 2005, voters presented their concept for a historically accurate reconstruction of old houses, alleys and squares under the title "An Old Town for Frankfurt's Soul".

In December 2005 the CDU tried to set up a special committee for the old town development, similar to the committee that had been formed during the planning for the reconstruction of the row of houses built on the Romer Square in the early 1980s. It became clear that the competitors were largely able to agree on a common line: the most exact possible restoration of the historical floor plan with its alleys, squares and courtyards, as well as the reconstruction of individual, significant houses.

In an interview with the Frankfurter Allgemeine Zeitung, Mayor Petra Roth (CDU) suggested that four buildings, including the Haus zur goldenen Waage and the Neue Rote Haus could be reconstructed, but Roth believed that these could not be rebuilt in their original locations. In May 2006, the German Federal Government architect (BDA) Workshop organised 50 architects to draft proposals for 20 plots to be built, with the spectrum of designs ranging from modern buildings with high proportions of glass to modern interpretations of half-timbered houses (similar to the houses built in Saalgasse in the 1980s).

In June 2006 it was announced that the technical town hall would be demolished in 2008. In order to involve the citizens in the planning, a planning workshop with around 60 participants was carried out by the city in autumn 2006.

Based on some basic points made at these events, in November 2006, the political powers presented key points for the future development of the old town: extensive restoration of the historical city plan, reconstruction of four buildings (Haus zur Goldenen Waage, Neues Rotes Haus, Haus zum Esslinger and Goldenes Lämmchen) at their historical locations, as well as design guidelines for the other houses. The archaeological garden was to be built over in small parts and remain open to the public.

=== Plan development ===
In September 2007, the city council approved a plan for the reconstruction of additional buildings, provided that private investors could fund them.

The move of the city offices from the Technisches Rathaus was replanned for autumn 2009, and the demolition began in 2010.

In July 2009, an architecture competition for the development of the archaeological garden, called "Stadthaus am Markt", was launched. In addition, the Dom-Römer GmbH was founded as an urban company for the development of the Dom-Römer area. According to an initial estimate by Dom-Römer GmbH, the cost of building the old town was €95 million, of which €20 million was due to the demolition of the town hall.

In December 2009, the design by the architecture firm Prof. Bernd Winking Architects for the "Stadthaus am Markt" was awarded 1st prize. This provided for a compact building above the archaeological garden, but the draft was to be revised in consultation with the planning office of the city of Frankfurt. The four winners of the competition for the "Stadthaus am Markt" were asked by the city to revise their designs. This made it clear that the design that won the first prize would not necessarily be implemented.

Dom-Römer GmbH argued that all the buildings in the area that weren't planned to be reconstructed, could be feasibly reconstructed based on the available documentation, provided that private investors were found. The deadline for interested parties to purchase a property in the Dom-Römer area ended on 31 July 2010.

=== Planning conclusion ===
On 12 June 2010, the statutes for the Dom-Römer area came into force. This described guidelines for the structure and design of facades and roofs as well as the use of materials. Only steeply pitched gable roofs with a minimum of 55 degrees were permitted.

In August 2010 an open architecture competition for the new buildings on the Dom-Römer area was announced. A total of 56 architectural firms were selected to participate and were to develop new building designs for a total of 27 plots. Together with the eight plots that were planned for urban reconstructions, a total of 35 buildings were to be built on the site.

In September 2010, after a round of revisions, the fourth-placed architectural firm Meurer Architects was selected with a revised design for a building envisaged to cover the entire archaeological garden close to the cathedral. In order to maintain a small appearance, the building dimensions were designed as an ensemble of five buildings.

In March 2011, the results of the architecture competition for the new buildings on the Dom-Römer area were presented. In April 2011, the designs were publicly exhibited in the Paulskirche in Frankfurt, while the planning services for the eight urban and nine optional reconstructions were put out to tender. In July 2011, Dom-Römer GmbH announced another competition for the two plots Markt 7 and Markt 40, which resulted in first and three second prizes in October 2011, plus two recognition's.

On 24 January 2012, Dom-Römer GmbH presented the results of which architects were selected for the development of the Dom-Römer area and thus for the first time an overview of the future shape of the old town. In addition to the eight urban reconstructions, buyers were found for seven of the nine optional reconstructions. Only the builders of the Hühnermarkt 18 plots (Schildknecht house) and Braubachstraße 27 opted for new buildings. In total, 15 reconstructions and 20 new buildings were to be built. The chicken market as the central square of the new old town was reconstructed on three sides. The architects, who were awarded first prizes in 2011, prevailed over the new buildings, which fit harmoniously into the ensemble of the old town, but should nevertheless be recognizable as 21st century buildings. In 2013, a citizens' initiative was formed against the competition results in favour implementing more reconstructions with the help of a citizens' decision. It was unsuccessful.

== Architectural history ==
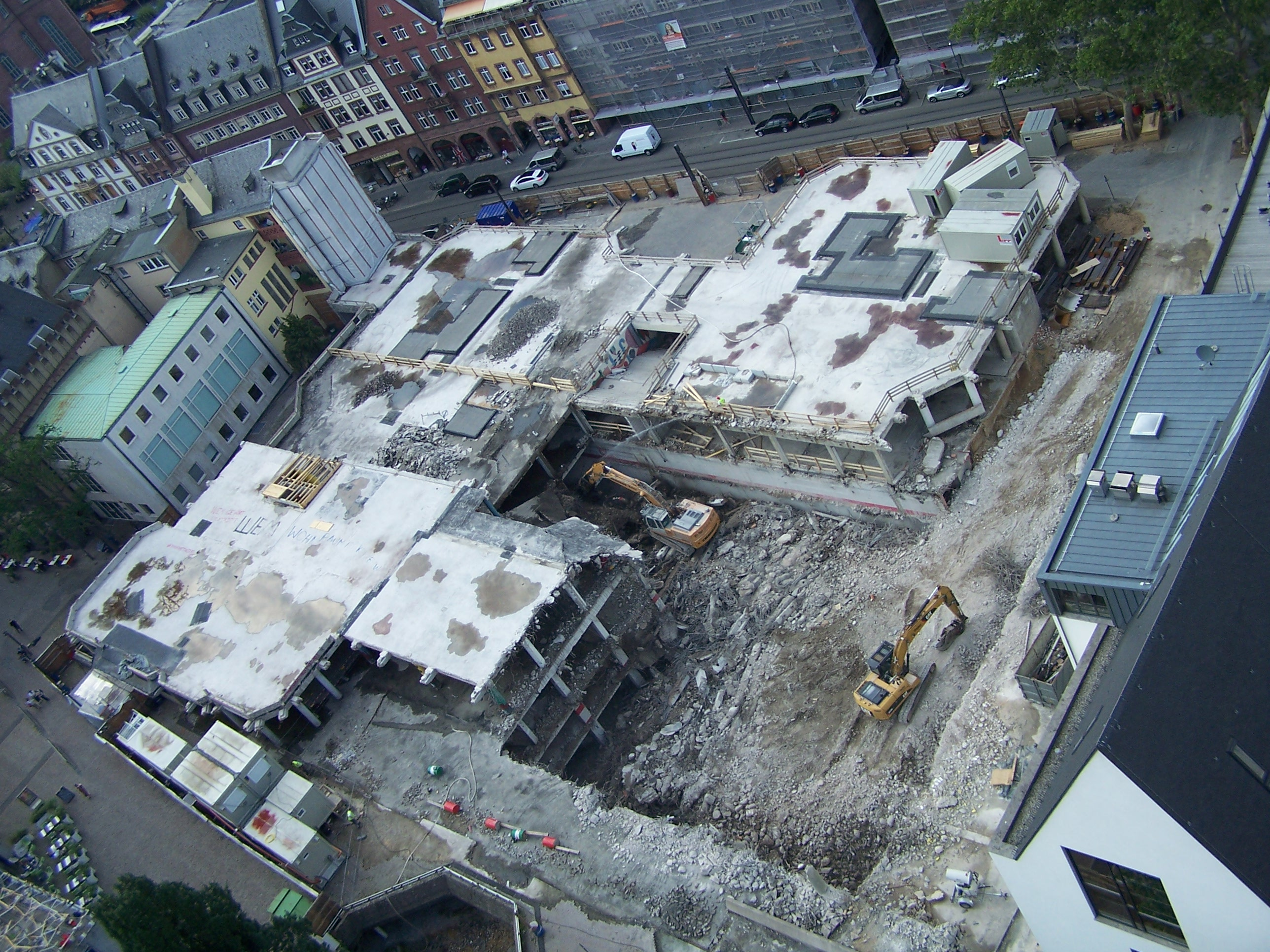
Dom-Römer area with the remains of the technical town hall (August 2011)

At the beginning of April 2010, the demolition of the technical town hall began and was completed by early 2012.

The foundation stone for the development of the Dom-Römer area was laid symbolically on 23 January 2012. The buildings were built on top of the 1972 underground car park and subway station.

In August 2012 an extension of the Schirn art gallery had to be demolished in order to create more space for the new old town.

The completion of the entire Dom-Römer area was planned for 2017. In December 2015, it was announced that the construction costs of the project would not be around 170 million euros, but would again amount to 185.7 million euros, according to a new estimate. The townhouse was finally opened in June 2016.

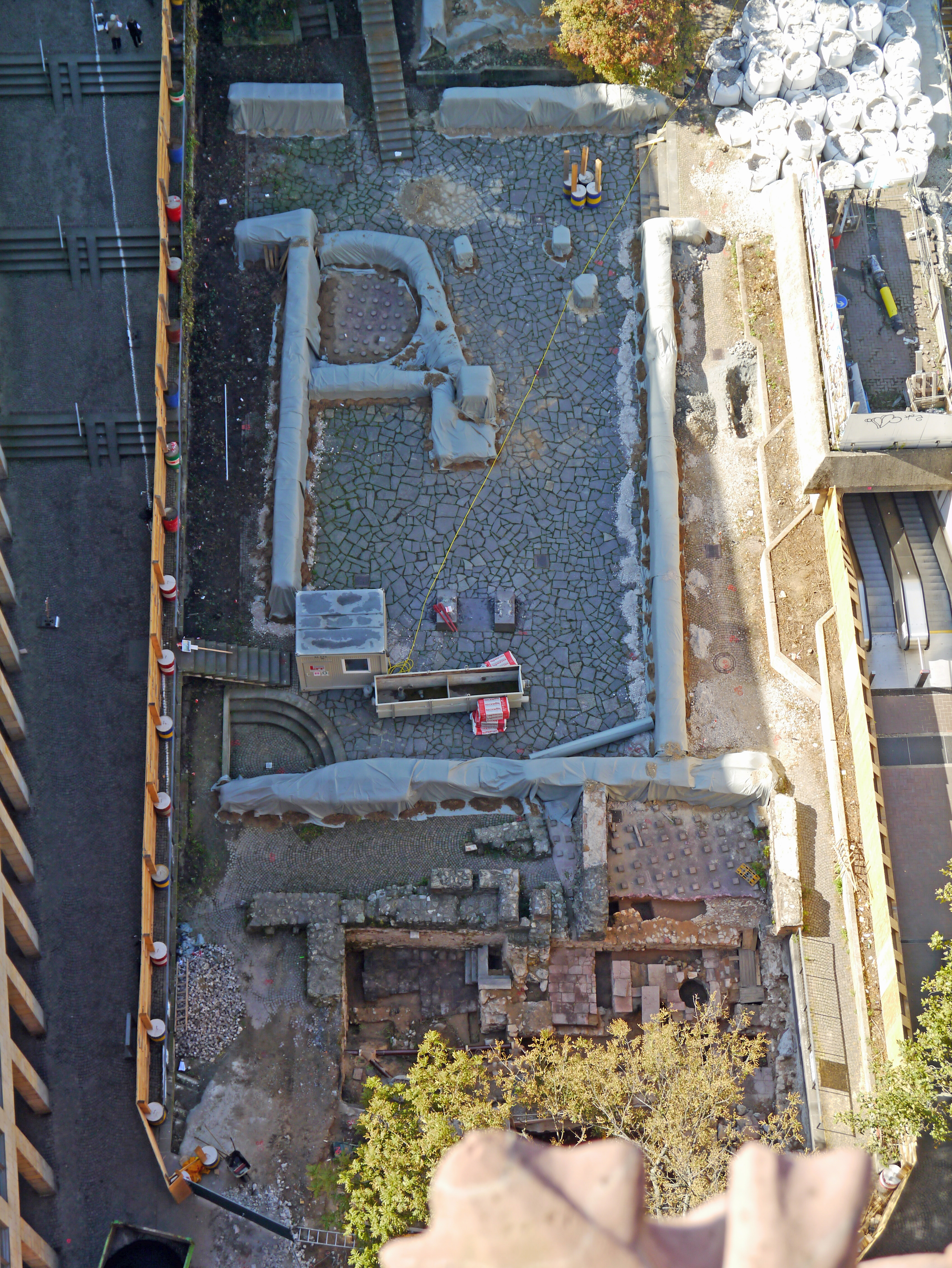
The Archeological Garden (October 2012)

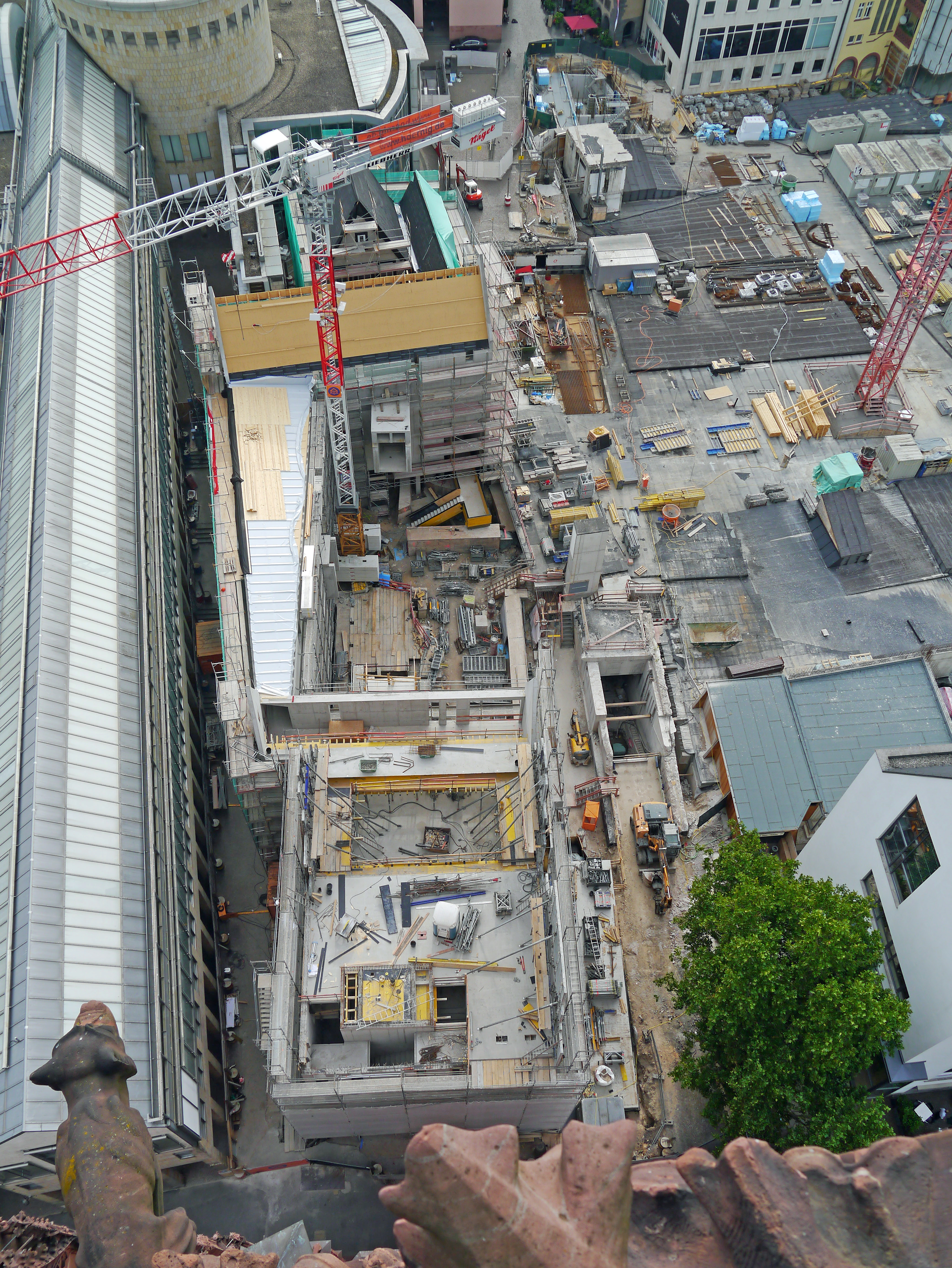
Building the museum on top of the Archaeological Garden
(June 2014)

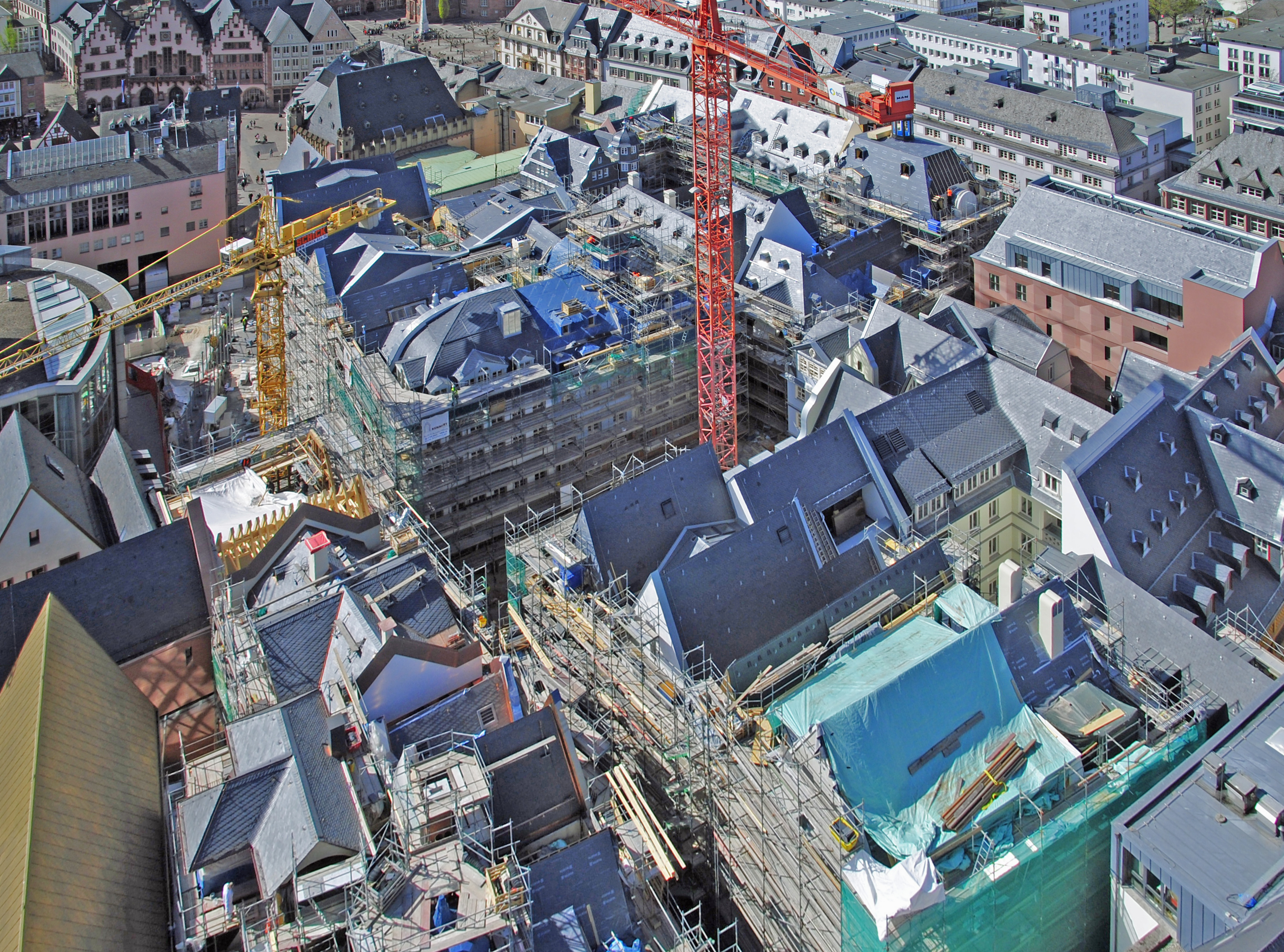
The old town under construction (April 2017)

On 15 October 2016, the city of Frankfurt celebrated the topping-out ceremony and opened parts of the construction site to citizens. A virtual project film gave an impression of what the old town would look like after completion.

On 12 December 2016, the managing director of the GmbH reported to the Dom-Römer special committee that the current calculation was 196 million euros. As the head of planning stated, the additional costs would arise from non-project costs, such as the renovation of the underground car park. At the same time bring only the 65 apartments on the site of a 90 million euro for the city.

In December 2017, the externally completed reconstructions were presented at a press appointment. Originally, the Coronation Trail and Dom-Römer area were to be open to the public from the end of March 2018; ultimately happened on 9 May. From 28 to 30 September 2018, the new old town district was officially opened with an old town festival, in which more than 250,000 visitors took part.

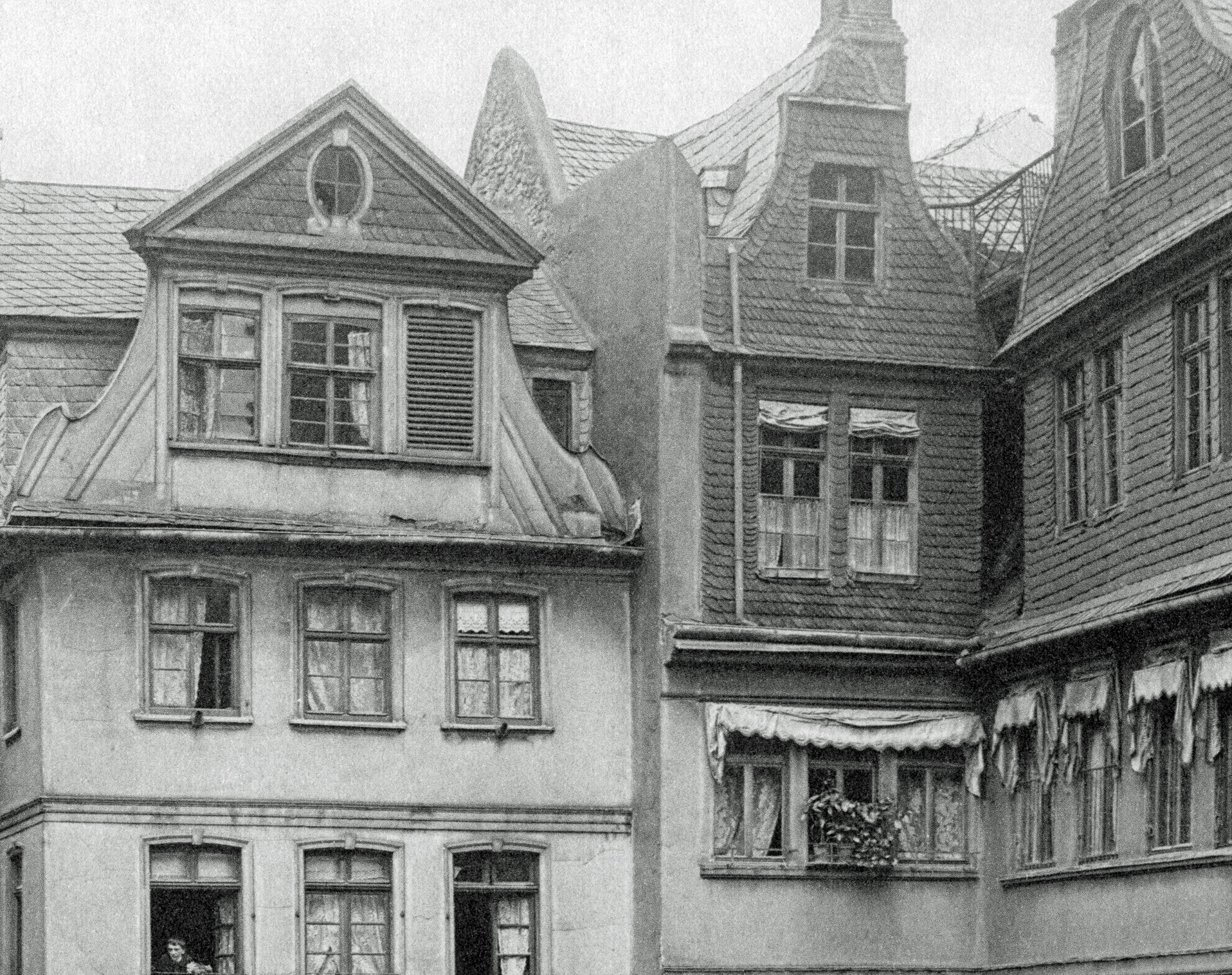
Building facade Hühnermarkt,
before destruction 1944

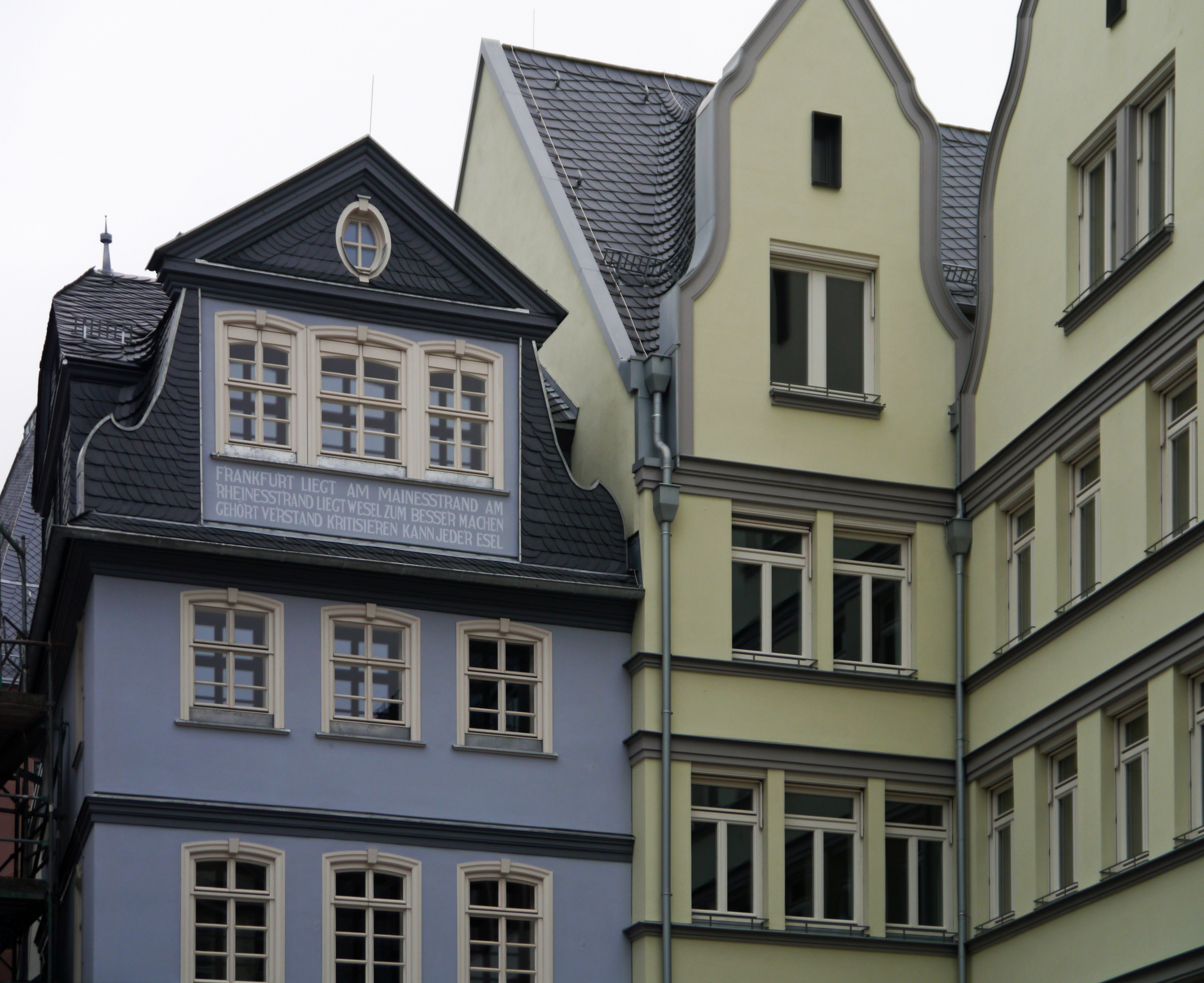
Reconstructed and newly interpreted at the same site 2018

The actual total cost of the project will be available in spring 2020 when all buildings are occupied and identified deficiencies are resolved. According to the current economic plan, DomRömer GmbH anticipates total costs of "around 200, maximum 210 million euros". The city of Frankfurt raised around 75 million euros from the sale of the apartments. Over €80 million was also transferred to the city's fixed assets, including the Stadthaus am Markt (€25 million), the refurbished underground car park (€35 million), the Goldene Waage and Neues Rotes Haus (€8 million and €3 million respectively). The value of the shops and restaurants from which the city generates ongoing rental income is around 12 million euros. About 15 to 20 percent of the additional costs incurred during the construction period are due to changes in the plan and interventions in the construction process.

== Reception ==
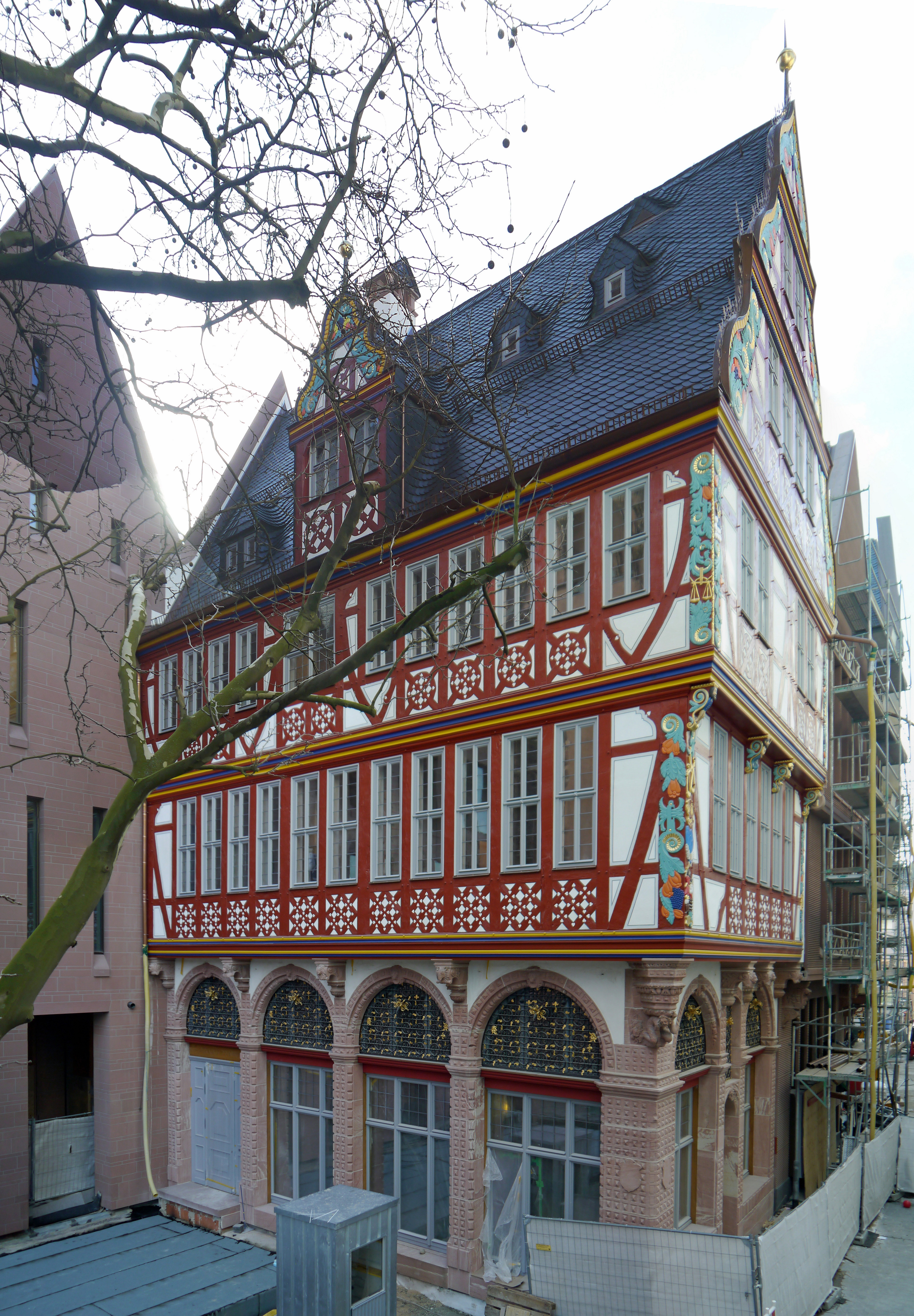
The most complex individual project was the reconstruction of the Haus zur goldenen Waage (January 2018).

Public criticism and approval accompanied the project from the start. The lines of argumentation often followed the same pattern as since the beginning of the reconstruction debate immediately after the destruction. Dieter Bartetzko compares the old town with an unfathomably deep fountain that draws on the myths of the past and gives life in the present. He recalls that the fountain on the chicken market was drilled as early as Roman times and that the Carolingian people were probably already aware that they lived on historical ground. This explains why Frankfurt was referred to in its first documentary mention in 794 as a locus celeber, a celebrated site. He describes the old town with Nietzsche as an architectural palimpsest that always keeps the memory of the past in the minds of city dwellers, no matter how often it is overwritten. He explains this thesis using the example of the new building at Großer Rebstock (Markt 8) and the reconstruction at Braubachstraße 21. In contrast, the Technisches Rathaus, "rammed as a concrete juggernaut in the middle of the previously closed row of houses on Braubachstrasse", had remained a provocative and ignorant foreign body in the urban fabric for decades. In spite of its architectural quality, this was his doom.

Dankwart Guratzsch points to the broad consensus in which the reconstruction was decided. "It is the will of a committed citizenry ... It is a piece of civic pride that manifests itself in these houses, and the best craftsmen, artists, monument experts and architects contribute to it ... The citizen of the almost digitally located society insures the lost anchor of its origin and provides it with rock solid reinforcement made of cement".

Jürgen Tietz doubts that the new old town will contribute to the future of the city. It is a fairytale world, the danger is great that "only a dollhouse will be created, a backdrop for photographing tourists, selfie stick drawn and thumbs up. What characterizes historic old towns cannot be ordered and also not simply built". The creative replicas are "fake architecture", "between the concrete structure and the exposed stone wall, the insulation wool peels out and proves that history is even possible in the face of today's building regulations cannot be reproduced true to the original".

Philipp Oswalt said similarly. It is absurd to build so few apartments for 200 million. The city stopped social housing, subsidized luxury apartments and thus privatized public goods. The entire Dom-Römer project is an expression of a conservative zeitgeist that hides the disintegration of public cohesion through symbolic-media replacement. "It's not a question of how you can build a city that is useful today – it's about generating an image of a city".

Stephan Trüby criticized the entire project. The New Old Town was initiated by Claus Wolfschlagback, a "right-wing radical with links to the extremist milieu". This is no coincidence, "the reconstruction architecture in Germany is currently developing into a key medium of authoritarian, ethnic, historical revisionist rights". It was "scandalous that the initiative of a right-wing radical without any significant civil society resistance led to a slick neighborhood with seemingly seamless repeat architectures". The new old town is "a sub-complex heal-world building that reduces history to a one-dimensional concert of your dreams ... A history in which National Socialism, the German wars of aggression and the Holocaust still survive as anecdotes of an otherwise unbroken national history". Trüby's theses also received international attention, for example in the Observer.

The architecture journalist Enrico Santifaller contradicts this. The debate about the old town has historical roots, since 1880 the design has always been struggling anew, with opponents and advocates of reconstructions not fitting in a right-left scheme. The reconstruction of the Römerberg-Ostzeile was based on an idea by the SPD Mayor Rudi Arndt. At the same time, Linke and Spontis had instigated the Frankfurt house fight, "sociologists see today as the beginning of a second homeland security movement". The "storm of indignation", which was triggered by the "remarkably mediocre facade views" of the winning design from the 2005 competition, was decisive for the reconstruction project of the new old town. "Unlike the second-place design ... which u. a. Paying tribute to the place with a multi-angle roof landscape, in the historical center of Frankfurt the "architectural sin" of the Technical Town Hall was to be replaced by the usual dreary cough of the real estate industry. "Only then did a dynamic develop," in which the idea, tallest skyscrapers in continental Europe, building an "old" and "cozy" city suddenly became consensual". Santifaller advocates avoiding ideological blinkers and "risking a second look". Only through this was it possible to see, in addition to all banal re-creations and new creations, as well as detailed errors, the "subtle and not always legible references to breaks and discontinuity", for example in the house of the three Romans or the building in Braubachstrasse 21.

In his reply to Trüby's polemic, Matthias Alexander also points out that "reconstructions cannot be classified politically either on the right or on the left. They obtain their legitimation primarily from two sources: their craft quality and their civic acceptance. Both are given in Frankfurt".

Hanno Rauterberg contradicts the thesis that the reconstruction of the old town goes hand in hand with the erasure of history and guilt. The debate alone leads to more people thinking about the destruction and its background. On the other hand, "no one in Frankfurt felt reminded of the bomb war and Shoah when they saw the now demolished Technical Town Hall". Most critics mocked questions of taste. "It is often said that this type of architecture is just a backdrop, untrue, inauthentic ... But architecture is always illusory ... Only in some residential and commercial areas, where every design claim is sacrificed, is the architecture really true".

Even Laura Weißmüller emphasizes the quality and attention to detail with which the New Old Town was built. Starting with the planning and the careful construction, all parties involved, builders, architects, planners and construction companies pulled together in Frankfurt. "One would wish that so much attention to detail and care would be put into a construction project that did not pretend that the Second World War had never existed".

Michael Guntersdorf talks to Matthias Alexander about his experiences with the Dom-Römer project. The project was essentially about city repair. One of the main benefits of the project is the recovery of Braubachstrasse. In the past 70 years, practically no urban space has emerged that has the quality of the new old town. The ensemble effect is even better than originally thought. Suddenly the architects are on the defensive and have a professional discussion about their health. One could learn from the project for future new building projects "that one needs more depth in dealing with architecture. It can no longer be about creating volume. You have to provide identification with special design elements. You have to put more effort into the details". He opposes criticism that you could have built many social housing for the same money; this thinking is "totally limited". "It was a sensible investment, it brings the city forward. The foreigners in particular, who we led over the construction site, were of the opinion that the people of Frankfurt should have remembered their history as a European metropolis much earlier". He personally likes the two new buildings. Best with the Three Romans (Markt 40) and Großer Rebstock (Markt 8); the least successful are the Goldene Schachtel (Markt 32) and her neighbor Alter Burggraf.

Andreas Maier describes the New Old Town for the travel journal of the FAZ from the "most beautiful and useless place in Frankfurt", the Belvedere of the Haus zur goldenen Waage, "face to face with the cathedral tower". He knew Belvederchen, which was destroyed in 1944, from "illustrated books about old Frankfurt", which he studied as a young man, "the invocation of an era that is no longer imaginable, ... pure history ... Frankfurt as a possibility of total idyll". He then sits down First of all, basically with architectural reconstructions, using the example of the Dresden Zwinger, the Knochenhaueramtshaus and the Warsaw Old Town who kept the memory of their destruction in different ways. He recalls an earlier article that he wrote about the planned demolition of the Technical Town Hall and reconstructions in the old town for Die Zeit, and in which he made fun of the "half-timbered longing", the "longing for a city like this looks like the cities that Frankfurt might like to visit as tourists". After a tour of the construction site, however, he was impressed by the quality of the construction and also the architecture, and the enthusiasm of the craftsmen. He states: "Valuable materials, traditional craftsmanship, everything at its finest. With its new old town, which is also in the Manufactum Catalog, Frankfurt makes itself a gift. And there is the Belvederchen as praline on top". In addition to the Belvederchen, he is particularly impressed by the Schönau house (Market 10) "a very narrow thing with a slate facade pulled down deep… and a slightly convex curvature of the elegantly stepped front. Probably an absolutely unique piece".
