= Crapo Park =

- Crapo Park and Arboretum Historic District
- U.S. National Register of Historic Places
- U.S. Historic district
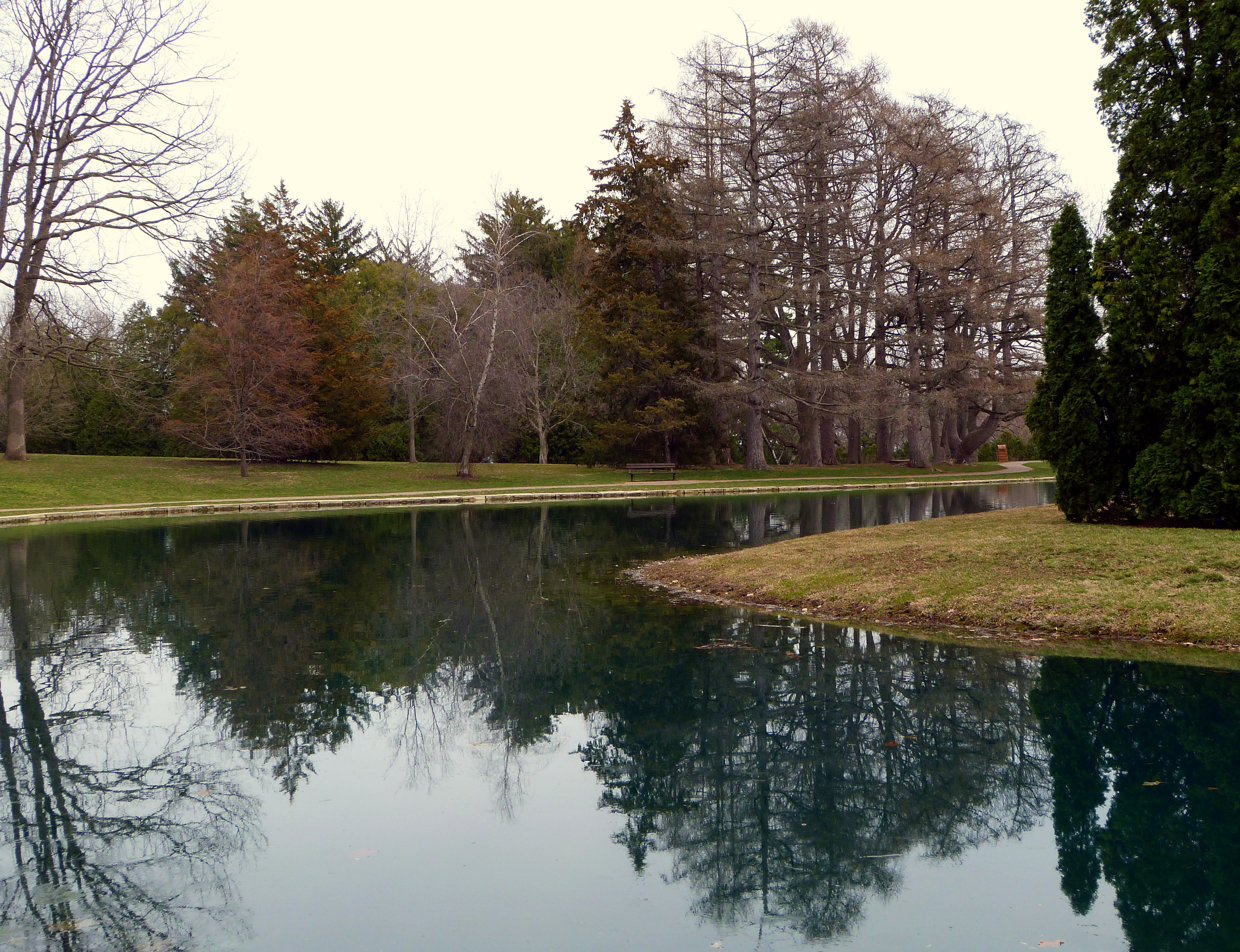
- Crapo Park in 2013.

- Location within Iowa Location within the United States
- Location: Bounded by Parkway Dr., Koestner St., Madison Ave., and Main St., Burlington, Iowa
- Coordinates: 40°46′33″N 91°6′7″W
- Built: 1895
- NRHP reference No.: 76000762
- Added to NRHP: June 3, 1976

Crapo Park (85 acres, 34 hectares) is a city park with arboretum and botanical garden, alongside the Mississippi River at Parkway Drive, Burlington, Iowa. Those who are not familiar with the park often mispronounce it as "crap-oh" Park, with the correct pronunciation being (/ˈkreɪpoʊ/ KRAY-poh) Park.

It is reputed to be the site where the American flag was first raised on Iowa's soil, by Zebulon Pike in 1805.

The park includes an arboretum containing more than 200 varieties of trees and shrubs, as well as botanical gardens of annuals and perennials. As of 2003, the following park trees were on Iowa's statewide "Big Tree" list: Arizona cypress (Cupressus arizonica), black hickory (Carya glabra), pawpaw (Asimina triloba), and black walnut (Juglans nigra).

== History ==
The park was established in 1895 by Philip Crapo, a local businessman and philanthropist, in time for the Iowa semi-centennial (1896), with landscape engineering by Earnshaw and Punshon of Cincinnati, Ohio.

The park was added to the National Register of Historic Places in 1976.

== Amenities ==
In addition to the numerous walking paths, shelter houses, playgrounds, and floral gardens, the park contains several features. The neighboring Dankwardt Park is popular with frisbee-golf enthusiasts.

=== Crapo Park Arboretum ===
As mentioned above, the park maintains several hundred species of trees. Maps and information lists describe the various examples.

=== Lake Starker ===
Constructed in 1905, Lake Starker covers 1.5 acres (0.6 hectares) and contains goldfish, frogs, and turtles. It is a frequent stop for Canadian Geese.

=== Hawkeye Natives Log Cabin ===
The Hawkeye Natives Log Cabin was originally built in 1910 as a meeting place by a local civic organization. The current building is a reconstruction and has been open to the public as a museum since 1971.

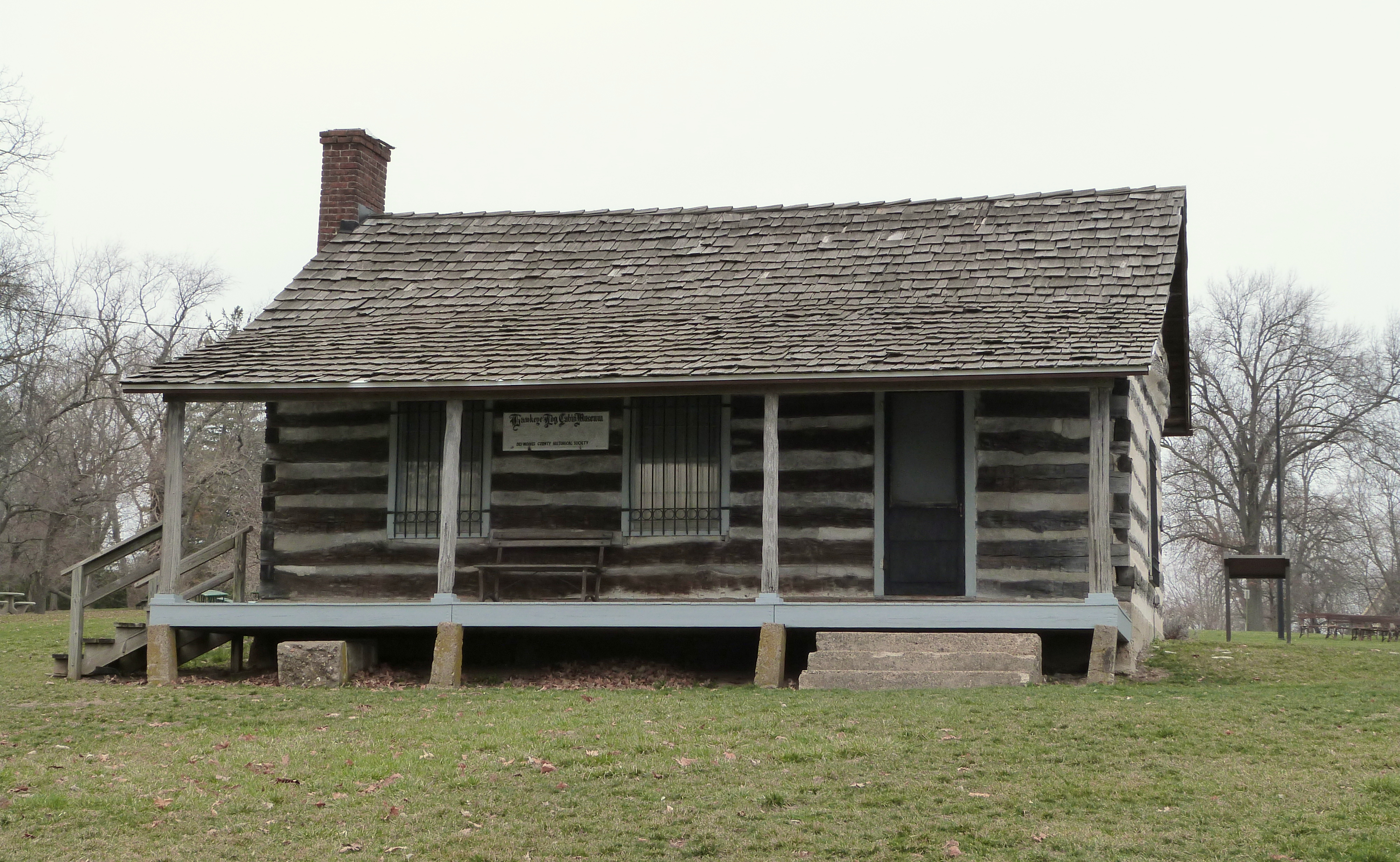
Hawkeye Log Cabin Museum

=== The Zebulon Pike Memorial ===
Flanked by a pair of Work War II era 50 calibre naval guns, the Zebulon Pike Memorial commemorates the raising of the first United States flag in what would become the state of Iowa.

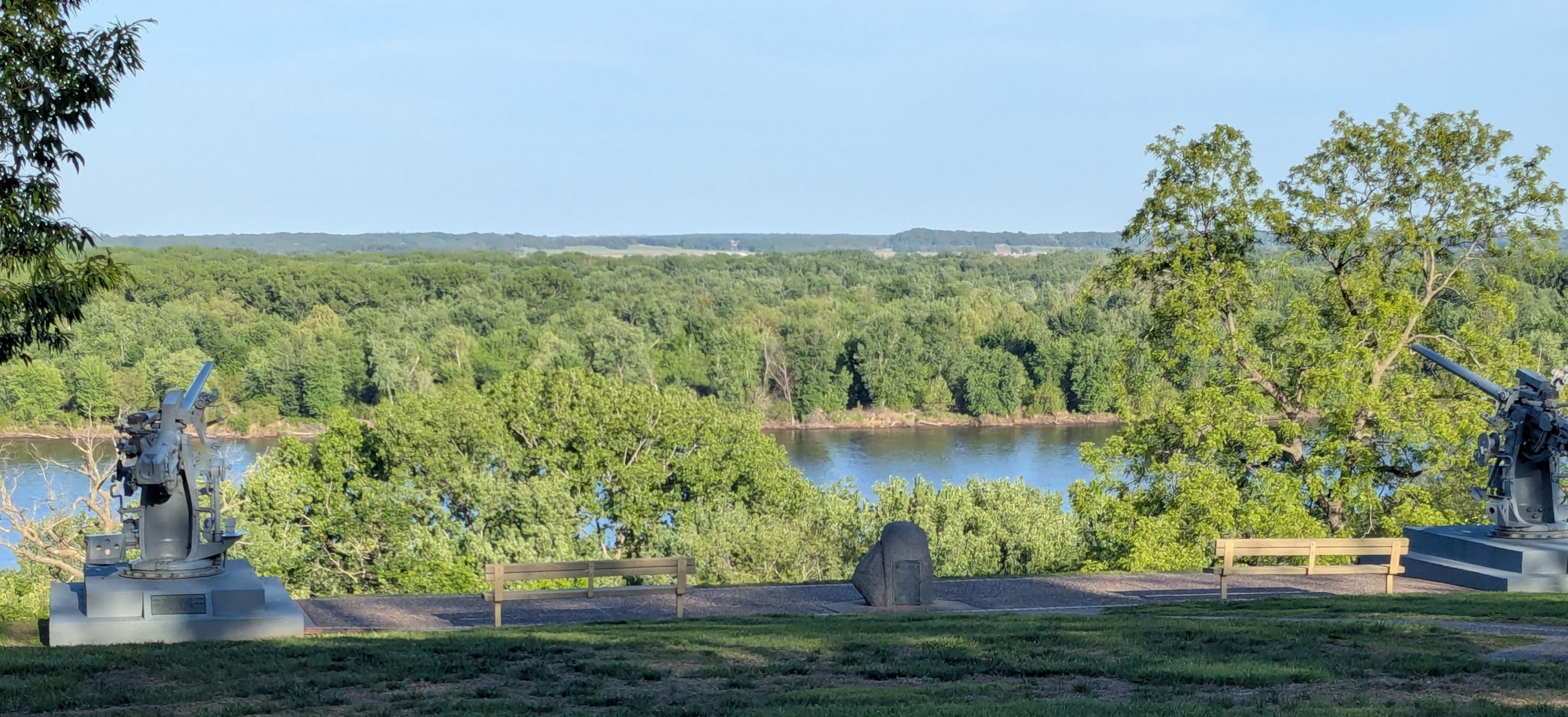
Zebuloon Pike Memorial

=== Black Hawk Cave ===
Black Hawk Spring and Cave commemorates Chief Black Hawk. One can crawl for more than a hundred feet through a rock tube before the passage gets too small. A cold spring runs through the cave as well.

=== Foehlinger Fountain ===
The Foehlinger Fountain is an electrically operated fountain providing rotating lighting patterns during the summers.

=== Band Shell ===
Located on the bluff near the Zebulon Pike Memorial, the band shell and surrounding area provide a natural venue for outdoor concerts. The Burlington Municipal Band performs in the park on Sundays throughout the summer. The Southeast Iowa Symphony also performs annually at the popular Symphonic Blast concert.

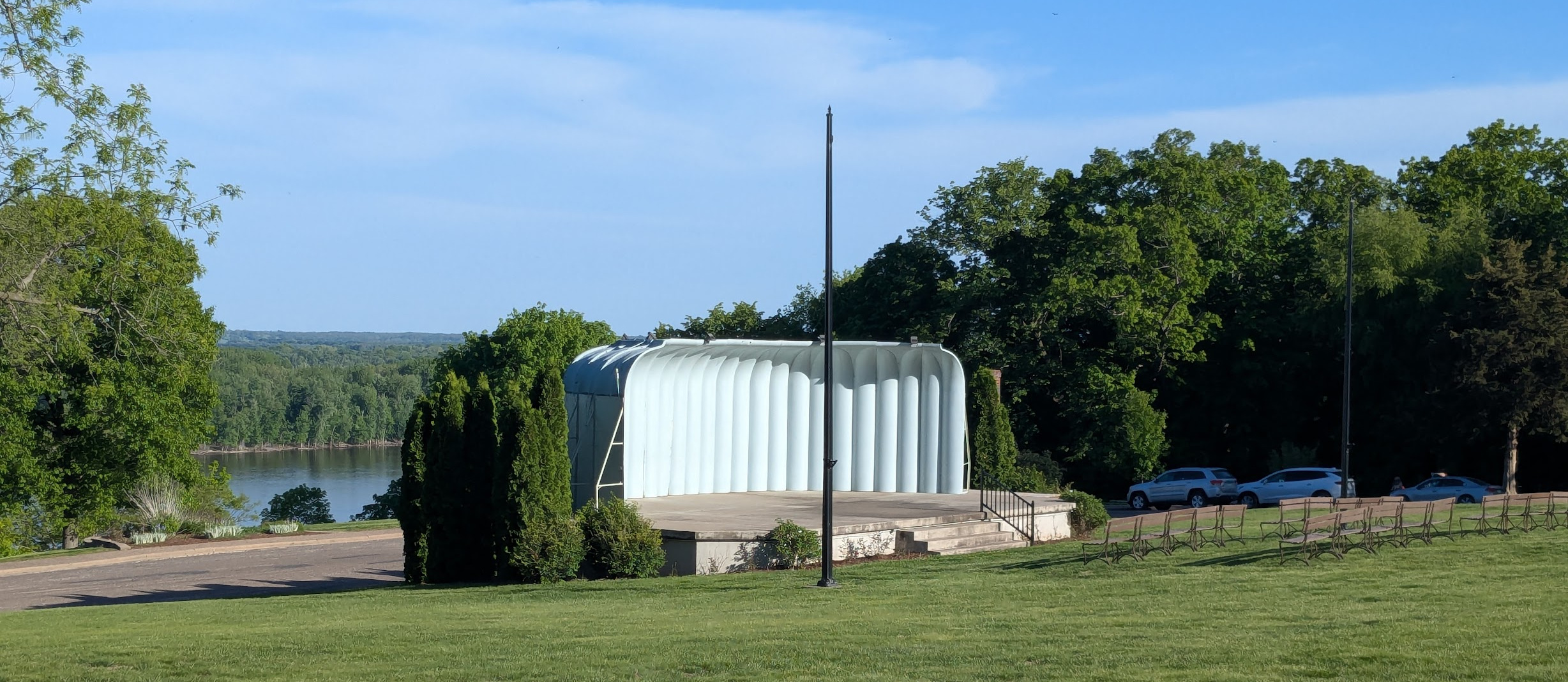
Crapo Park Band Shell and Log Cabin - Burlington Iowa

== See also ==
- List of botanical gardens in the United States
- Crapo Park Arboretum Tree Map
- Crapo Park Arboretum Tree Information and Identification List
- Burlington Munincipal Band Website
- Southeast Iowa Symphony Website
- Media related to Crapo Park at Wikimedia Commons
