= Dankwardt Park =

Park in Burlington, United States of America

- Interactive map of Dankwardt Park
- Location: Burlington, Iowa
- Coordinates: 40.7822297°N 91.1075699°W
- Area: 72 acres (29 ha)
- Created: 1937
- Operator: City of Burlington Parks and Recreation Department
- Status: Always open

Dankwardt Park is a 72 acres (29 ha) municipal park in the southeast section of Burlington, Iowa. It is located adjacent to Crapo Park and is bordered by Shoquoquon Drive, and by South Main Street and Madison Avenue. The park was established in 1937 on land donated to the city by Lydia Dankwardt as a memorial to her family. Dankwardt Park host numerous recreational opportunities, including a disc golf course, a swimming pool and tennis courts.
