= Dankwart Guratzsch =

German journalist

Dankwart Guratzsch (born 14 June 1939) is a German journalist. He has made a name for himself above all as an architecture critic.

== Life ==
Guratzsch was born in Dresden in 1939, the son of the writer and teacher Curt Guratzsch (1891-1965). In 1957, he left his native city for West Germany. After studying history and German studies in Marburg, Munich and Hamburg, he was awarded a doctorate in 1970 at the Faculty of Philosophy of the University of Hamburg with Macht durch Organisation. Die Grundlegung des Hugenbergschen Presseimperiums, a dissertation about Alfred Hugenberg. In 1957, he left his native city and went to West Germany.

Guratzsch began in the mid-1970s as a feature editor at the daily newspaper Die Welt, where he specialised in architecture as well as urban planning and urban design. Even before this was taken up in other media, Guratzsch advocated a cautious approach to architectural heritage and urban planning that was oriented towards the traditions of the respective place. He was particularly displeased with the urban planning developments in the German Democratic Republic. In critical articles he reported on the demolition of Altbau quarters there, rejecting commuter towns, housing estates and Plattenbau quarters as "red urbanism". He always advocated private home ownership as well as the preservation and sustainable maintenance of old building quarters - especially those of historism from the Gründerzeit - in West and East. The Ministry of State Security of the GDR observed Guratzsch suspiciously, his Stasi files comprises 200 pages.

Guratzsch remained particularly attached to his hometown of Dresden, whose air raids on Dresden had sharpened his view of architecture and urban planning throughout his life. After the fall of the Berlin Wall, he became involved in numerous reports and reportages as well as in various committees for a history-oriented reconstruction of the city, especially of the Frauenkirche as its centrepiece. Guratzsch is co-owner of properties in the Dresdner Neustadt and member of the association Haus & Grund Sachsen e. V. He also intensively accompanied journalistically the so-called Dresdner Brückenstreit and the associated Waldschlösschen Bridge construction project. He welcomed the reconstruction of the Berlin Palace.

Guratzsch suggested the establishment of a "bomb war museum" in Dresden. He proposes the large Erlwein-Gasometer in Dresden-Reick as the location. For him, Bombing of Dresden stands symbolically for the horrors of the Bombing War like no other city in Europe.

During the 1980s, in the course of the debate on the so-called Forest dieback, he also dealt journalistically with the phenomenon of new forest damage and published the book Baumlos in die Zukunft? (1984), which brought together expert contributions from twelve experts - among them several forest scientists.

Guratzsch received several awards for his publications in the field of Cultural heritage management and as an architecture critic. The Deutsches Nationalkomitee für Denkmalschutz awarded him the German Prize for Monument Protection twice: the Journalist Prize in 1976 and the "Silver Hemisphere" in 1980. Guratzsch is on the board of trustees of the Deutsche Stiftung Denkmalschutz.

The journalist is one of the critics of the German orthography reform of 1996.

Guratzsch lives and works mainly in Frankfurt.

== Publications ==
- Macht durch Organisation. Die Grundlegung des Hugenbergschen Presseimperiums. Dissertationsschrift, Hamburg 1970 (im Druck als Band 7 der Reihe Studien zur modernen Geschichte, Bertelsmann-Universitätsverlag, Gütersloh 1974, ISBN 3-571-09011-X).
- as publisher: Baumlos in die Zukunft? Kindler, Munich 1984, ISBN 3-463-00874-2.
- as publisher: Das neue Berlin. Konzepte der Internationalen Bauausstellung 1987 für einen Städtebau mit Zukunft. Mann, Berlin 1987, ISBN 3-7861-1527-3.
- Wieviel ist Braunschweig seine Mitte wert? Die Stadt, das Schloß und das Center. (Braunschweiger Museumsvorträge, vol. 5). Braunschweigisches Landesmuseum, Braunschweig 2003, ISBN 3-927939-67-6.

== Awards ==
- 1976: Deutscher Preis für Denkmalschutz – Journalistenpreis – of the Deutsches Nationalkomitee für Denkmalschutz
- 1980: Deutscher Preis für Denkmalschutz – Silberne Halbkugel – of the Deutschen Nationalkomitees für Denkmalschutz
- 1986: Literaturpreis of the Verband Deutscher Architekten- und Ingenieurvereine.

== Quote ==
- Only the city of short distances, the city of density, diversity and livability is capable of survival.

Today, the apostles of 'new' building are on the defensive. A still growing majority of the population is tired of the abstract, geometric, talmi-like structures that threaten to dominate the image of cities and increasingly approach the chimerical flatness of screen simulations. All over Germany, between Leipzig and Frankfurt, Wismar and Karlsruhe, citizens' movements are demanding the reconstruction of vanished buildings. The Tag des offenen Denkmals with its pilgrimages of millions of monument visitors has become a mass demonstration against the blandness and weakness of expression of modern architecture.

— Dankwart Guratzsch, 2002
